= Wesley L. McDonald =

United States Army admiral (1924–2009)

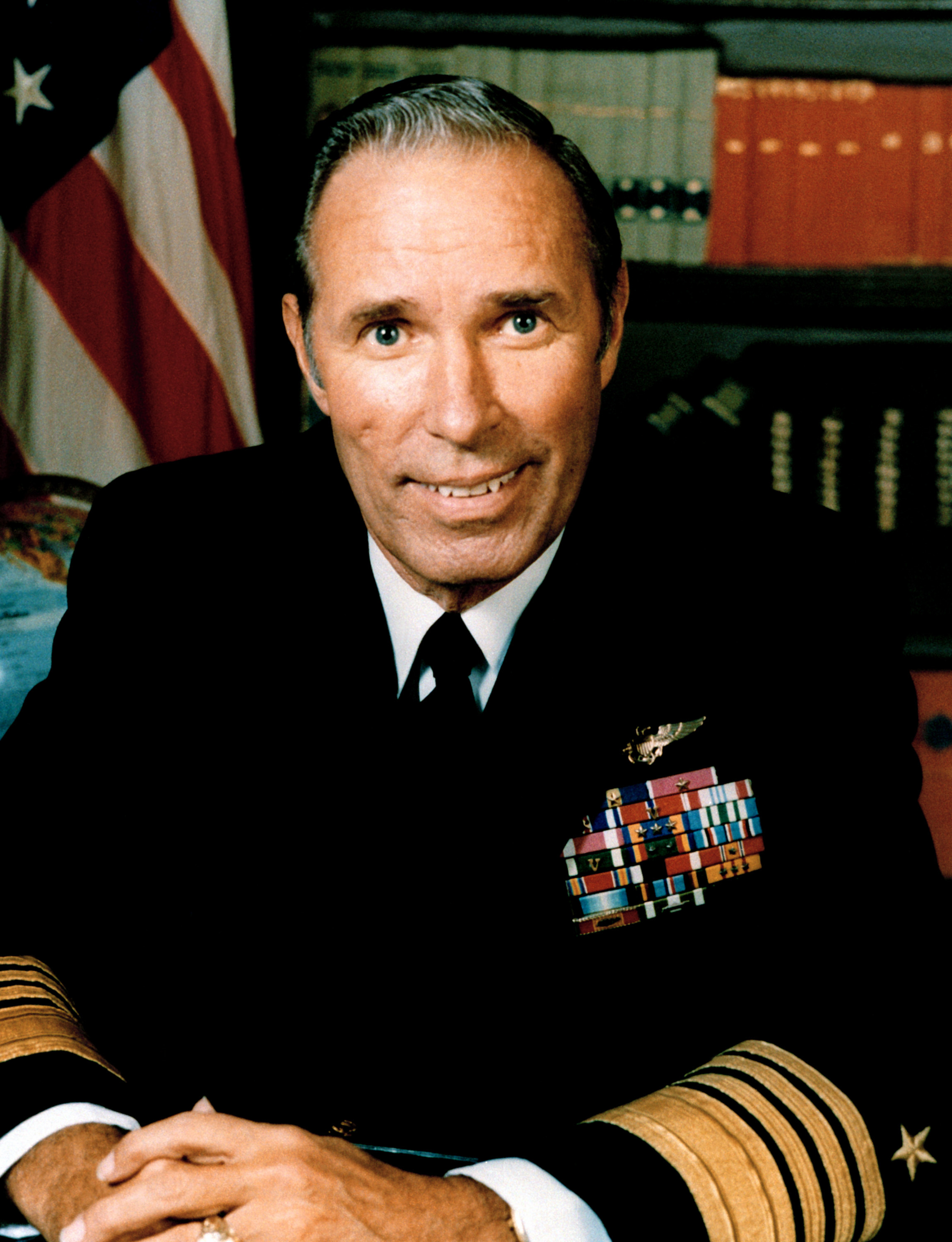
- Official United States Navy photographic portrait of McDonald.
- Born: July 26, 1924; Washington D.C., U.S.
- Died: February 8, 2009 (aged 84); Arlington County, Virginia, U.S.
- Burial place: Arlington National Cemetery
- Military career
- Allegiance: United States of America
- Branch: United States Navy
- Service years: 1946–1985
- Rank: Admiral
- Nickname: "Wes"
- Commands: Attack Squadron VA-56; USS Coral Sea (1970–1971); U.S. Second Fleet; U.S. Atlantic Fleet (1982–1985); U.S. Atlantic Command (1982–1985); Supreme Allied Commander Atlantic (1982–1985)
- Conflicts: Korean War; Vietnam War: Operation Pierce Arrow; Invasion of Grenada
- Awards: Defense Distinguished Service Medal; Navy Distinguished Service Medal (2); Legion of Merit (2); Distinguished Flying Cross (2); Bronze Star
- Other work: Business executive, advisor, fellow

Wesley Lee McDonald (July 26, 1924 – February 8, 2009) was a United States Navy admiral and naval aviator. He led the first air strike against North Vietnam after the Gulf of Tonkin incident and was the commander in charge of Operation Urgent Fury, the invasion of Grenada to rescue American citizens.

== Early life and education ==
McDonald was born in Washington, D.C., on July 6, 1924. He graduated from the United States Naval Academy in 1946 and married his high school sweetheart. He began his career as a naval aviator in 1950, serving in several carrier fighters and attack squadrons. In 1964, McDonald was the skipper of Attack Squadron VA-56 flying A-4 Skyhawks aboard the USS Ticonderoga. On August 5, 1964, he served as a flight leader for Operation Pierce Arrow, the first retaliatory strike against North Vietnam following the Gulf of Tonkin incident. McDonald led his Skyhawk strike force against oil tanks at Vinh, destroying 90% of the facility.

== Career ==
=== Senior leader ===
McDonald's career led him to the highest levels of the United States Navy's command structure. He attended the National Defense University's National War College, graduating with the class of 1969. From 1970 to 1971, he commanded the USS Coral Sea. In 1972, as a rear admiral, McDonald was assigned as the carrier group commander. He later served as deputy chief of Naval Personnel in Washington, D.C., in 1975. In the fall of 1977, as COM2ndFLT, The U.S.S. Harry E. Yarnell (CG-17) served as his flagship during NATO exercises in the North Atlantic. In 1978, as Commander of the U.S. Second Fleet, he embarked on the USS Arthur W. Radford on the way to NATO exercises in the North Atlantic. In 1982, McDonald was appointed Supreme Allied Commander Atlantic (SACLANT), one of two supreme commanders of the North Atlantic Treaty Organization. At the same time, he assumed command of the U.S. Atlantic Command (CINCLANT) and U.S. Atlantic Fleet (CINCLANTFLT). In 1983, McDonald, in his role as CINCLANT, was placed in overall command of Operation Urgent Fury—the invasion of Grenada to rescue U.S. nationals. He later summed up the success of the operation in an address before the House Armed Services Committee.

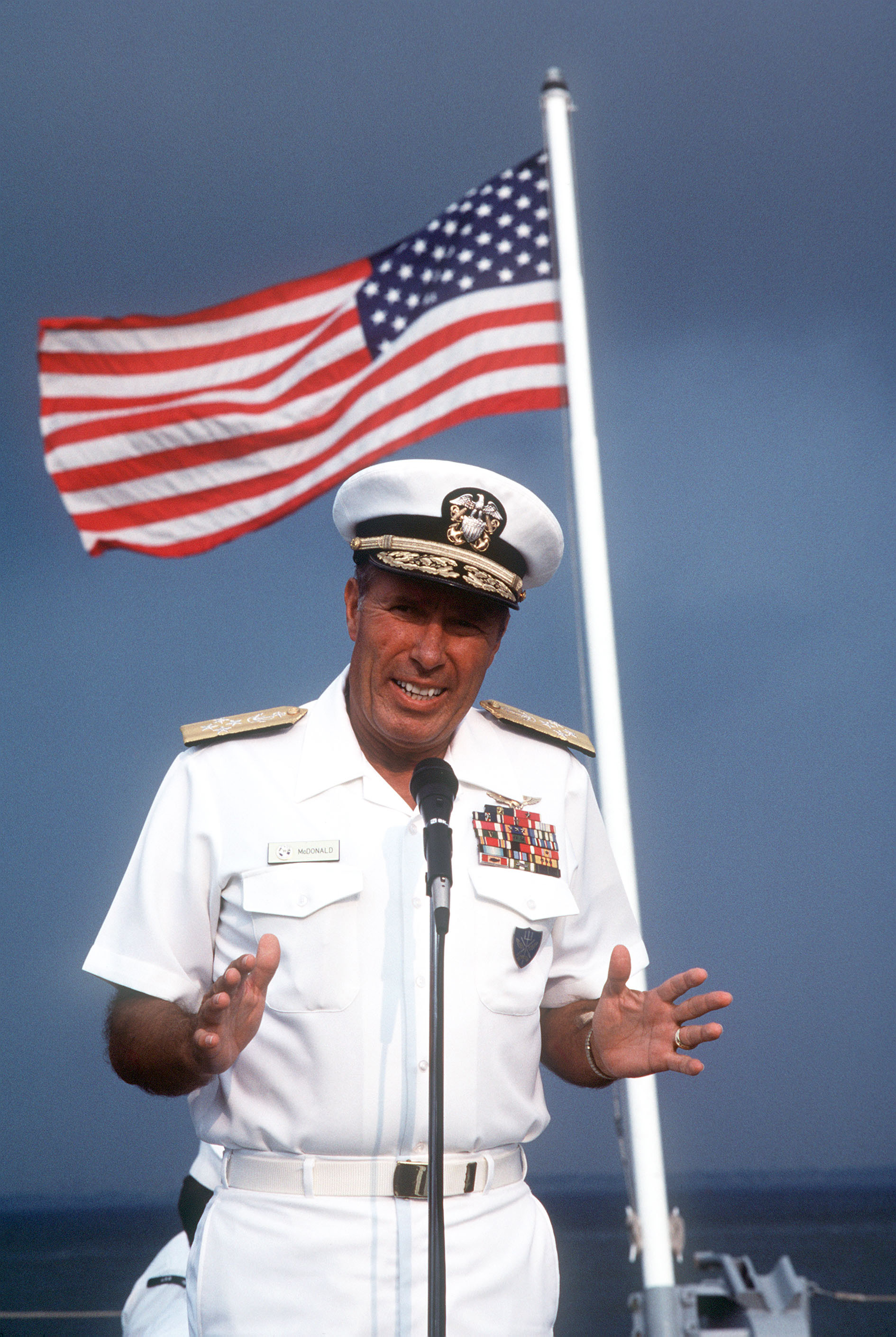
Admiral Wesley McDonald speaks at the presentation of the 1984 Batternberg Cup to the crew of the battleship USS Iowa (BB-61). (USN Photo)

History should reflect that the operation was a complete success. All phases of the assigned mission were accomplished. U.S. citizens were protected and evacuated. The opposing forces were neutralized. The situation stabilized with no additional Cuban intervention. U.S. students have returned to resume their studies at the medical school and tourism is steadily increasing. And, most importantly, a lawful, democratic government has been restored.

McDonald was the last United States Navy admiral to command all three organizations (Allied Atlantic Command, U.S. Atlantic Command, and U.S. Atlantic Fleet) at the same time. He relinquished command of the U.S. Atlantic Fleet to Admiral Carlisle A.H. Trost, USN, on October 4, 1985, and command of the U.S. Atlantic Command and Allied Atlantic Command to Admiral Lee Baggett Jr. in November 1985.

== Later life and death ==
After he retired from the Navy in 1985, McDonald played an active role in the aviation community in his leadership positions with the National Aeronautic Association (NAA) and the National Aviation Club (NAC). He helped orchestrate a merger of interests between NAA and NAC bringing benefits to both organizations. McDonald has also served on the boards of the U.S. Navy Memorial Foundation, the U.S. Naval Aviation Museum, and the Armed Services YMCA. McDonald also often guest lectured an honors senior seminar led by Ford Foundation Fellow Professor Karl von Vorys at the University of Pennsylvania, and often took groups of students on personal tours of the Pentagon. His first wife, Norma, died in 1989. McDonald later remarried and lived in Arlington, Virginia, with his wife, Helen until he died on February 8, 2009, in Arlington, Virginia. He has one son and three daughters and is buried at Arlington National Cemetery, in Arlington, Virginia.

== Awards and decorations ==

Badge	Naval Aviator Badge		
1st Row	Defense Distinguished Service Medal	Navy Distinguished Service Medal with one gold award star	Legion of Merit with award star
2nd Row	Distinguished Flying Cross with award star	Bronze Star with Valor device	Defense Meritorious Service Medal
3rd row	Meritorious Service Medal	Air Medal with three award stars	Joint Service Commendation Medal
4th Row	Navy and Marine Corps Commendation Medal with Valor device	Navy Unit Commendation with two bronze service stars	American Campaign Medal
5th Row	World War II Victory Medal	Navy Occupation Service Medal	National Defense Service Medal with service star
6th row	Antarctica Service Medal	Armed Forces Expeditionary Medal	Vietnam Service Medal with three service stars
7th Row	Vietnam Gallantry Cross Unit Citation	Vietnam Campaign Medal	Navy Rifle Marksmanship Ribbon
Badge	Supreme Allied Commander Atlantic		

== Honors and recognition ==
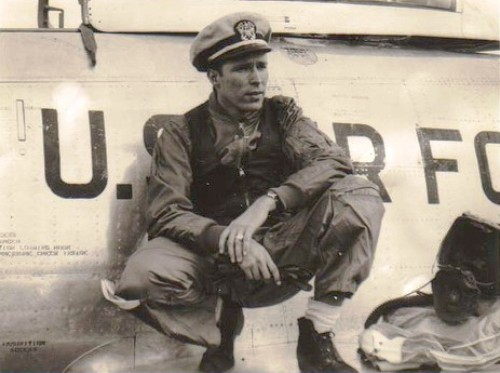
Lt. Wesley McDonald (USN Photo)

McDonald's awards include the Defense Distinguished Service Medal, the Navy Distinguished Service Medal, the Legion of Merit, the Distinguished Flying Cross, the Air Medal, and awards from several European and South American nations. In 1990, McDonald was elected Grand Paramount Carabao, leader of the Military Order of the Carabao. In 2004, McDonald was presented with the National Aeronautic Association's Cliff Henderson Award for his 56 years of support to American aviation. In 2007, the National Aeronautic Association renamed its Elder Statesman of Aviation Award in honor of McDonald, who was a past chairman of the organization. McDonald was a Senior Fellow of the National Defense University.

Several awards are named in honor of McDonald, including:

- The Admiral Wesley L. McDonald Leadership Award, jointly sponsored by Strike Fighter Wing Pacific, the San Joaquin Valley Squadron of the Association of Naval Aviation (ANA), and the Greater Kings County Navy League.
- The Wesley L. McDonald Distinguished Statesman and Stateswoman of Aviation Award, sponsored by the National Aeronautic Association.
