= Declaration of Honolulu, 1966 =

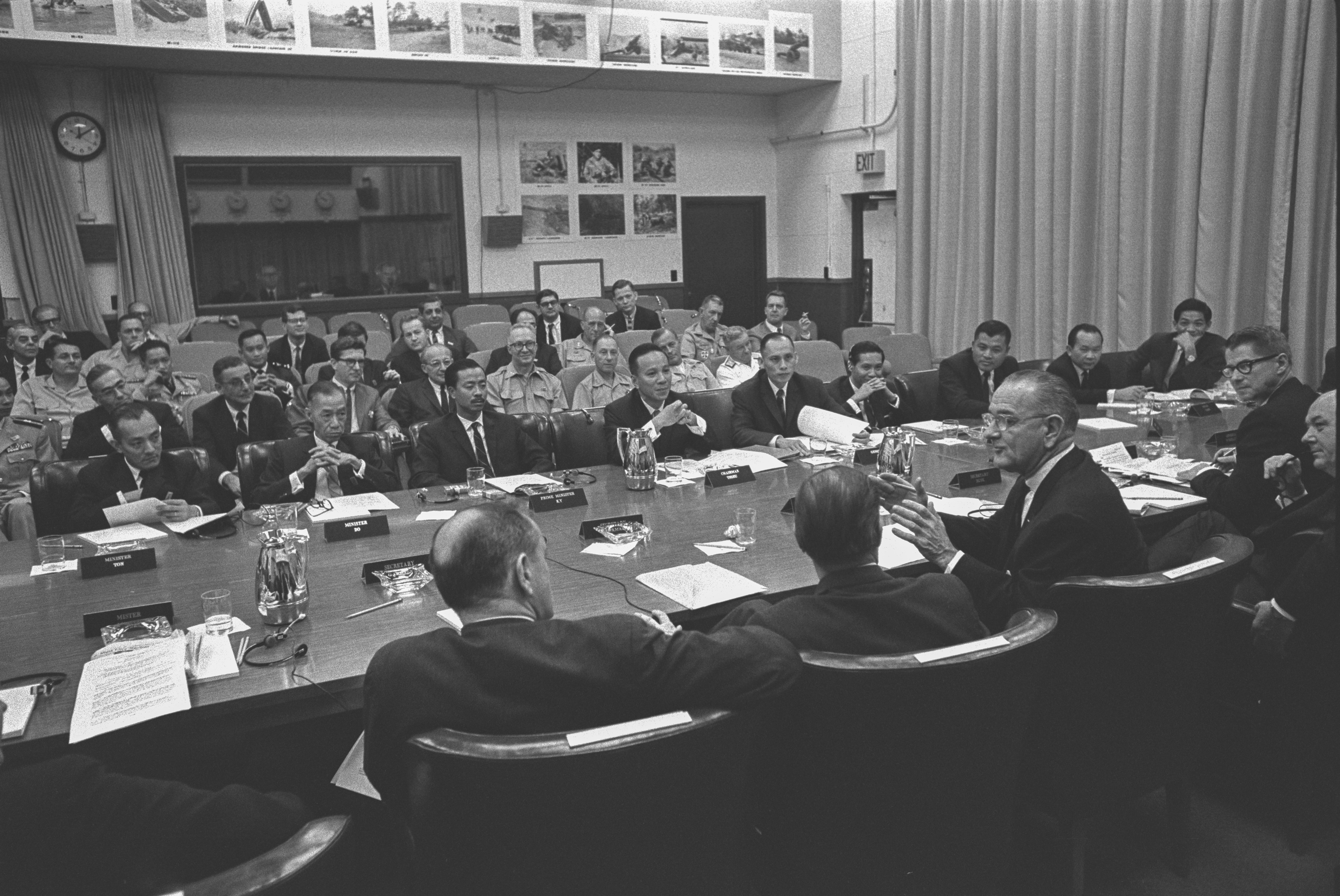
Lyndon B. Johnson and others at the Camp H.M. Smith, February 8, 1966.

The Declaration of Honolulu, 1966 was a communiqué and diplomatic proclamation acceded by foreign diplomats representing South Vietnam and the United States. The declaration asserted pro-democracy principles for South Vietnam while combating external aggression and insurgency by North Vietnam. The goals outlined at the conference were a cornerstone to US policy in Vietnam until 1969 when the incoming Nixon administration changed policies towards Vietnam.

== Hawaii Conference of February 1966 ==
The conference was held from February 5, 1966 to February 8, 1966 on the Hawaiian island of Oahu. The foreign dignitaries conducted the meeting at Camp Smith.

The South Vietnam Chief of State Nguyễn Văn Thiệu, South Vietnam Prime Minister Nguyễn Cao Kỳ, and United States President Lyndon Johnson exchanged concerns regarding United States sanctions for democracy in South Vietnam in conjunction with joint warfare in South Vietnam establishing a counter-insurgency for the Viet Cong insurgency. The unscheduled conference was hastily called by President Johnson in an attempt to upstage hearings by the Senate Foreign Relations Committee about the Vietnam War. The chairman of the committee, Senator J. William Fulbright, was an opponent of the war and he assembled a group of witnesses to testify who were all critical of the war, which led to Johnson to call for the conference in Honolulu in an attempt to distract public attention from the hearings in Washington. Because the conference had not been scheduled in advance, neither the American nor the South Vietnamese delegations had much time to prepare for the conference, and those who attended the conference described it as rather disorganized.

In order to shore up liberal American support for the war, which Johnson felt to be wavering, the main theme of the conference was that the war was to promote the social and economic development of South Vietnam. The war was presented as virtually an extension of Johnson's Great Society program to end poverty in the United States. Little of any substance was discussed and instead the conference was almost an infomercial for the Vietnam war. The conference had no agenda or even much preparation, and for the most part consisted of speeches designed to win over American public opinion. The key note speech was delivered by Kỳ in English, was written by his American advisers, where he called for a "social revolution" in South Vietnam that would ensure everyone in South Vietnam "respect and dignity, and a chance for himself and his children to live an atmosphere where all is not disappointment, despair and dejection". Afterwards, Johnson, who was unaware that the speech had been written by American officials, told Kỳ: "Boy, you speak just like an American". Johnson in his speech called for a relentless drive to eradicate the Viet Cong, saying in his Texas twang that he wanted "coonskins on the wall". Johnson's phrase "coonskins on the wall" confused the South Vietnamese and several South Vietnamese officials asked Bùi Diễm, the ambassador in Washington: "On ay noi cai gi the?" ("Just what is the gentleman talking about?").

By contrast, the Defense Secretary Robert McNamara during an "off-the-record" chat with a group of journalists at the conference spoke about the war in very jaded terms. McNamara stated his view that Operation Rolling Thunder (the American bombing offensive against North Vietnam), was a failure. McNamara commented that North Vietnam was a backward Third World country that did not have the same advanced industrial infrastructure of First World nations, making the bombing offensive useless as he expressed his view that North Vietnam would never be "bombed into submission". McNamara concluded that "No amount of bombing can end the war".

The conference with its emphasis on ending poverty and building infrastructure in South Vietnam gave a misleading picture of American strategy. In the early 1960s, the strategy in South Vietnam was at least nominally one of "rural pacification" where the United States would fund development projects in the countryside in order to "win the hearts and minds" of the South Vietnamese people as the prelude to defeating the Viet Cong. In 1965, the order of priorities was reversed with deployment of American ground forces to South Vietnam as the American forces under command of General William Westmoreland were focused on a military solution on defeating the Viet Cong as the prelude for "rural pacification". As one American officer told the journalist Stanley Karnow at the time: "Grab 'em by the balls, and their hearts and minds will follow".

Johnson summoned Ky, saying "Come into my bedroom for a moment". Johnson enjoyed bullying his Vice President, Hubert Humphrey, taking a sadistic pleasure out of humiliating him. The purpose of Ky's nocturnal visit to the presidential bedroom was to watch Johnson call up Humphrey as he was sleeping in Washington and ordered him in a brusque manner to go to South Vietnam at once. Going along with Humphrey on his sudden trip to South Vietnam was one of Johnson's aides, Jack Valenti, whom Humphrey learned from reading a misplaced cable had been ordered by Johnson to watch his move and report back to the president.

== Pledge of the Declaration ==
United States President Lyndon Johnson disclosed the declaration in a public statement on February 8, 1966. The document content was authored as four parts proposing the intents of the joint governments and their common diplomatic commitment.

Part I: Joint Declaration by Republic of Vietnam and United States
Part II: Purposes of Vietnam Government
Part III: Purposes of United States Government
Part IV: Common Commitment

== The Declaration ==
The United States acknowledged South Vietnam opposing two conflicting fronts.

- Guerrilla and jungle warfare pursued by the North Vietnamese communist state
- Social injustice against disease, hunger, ignorance, and political apathy

The declaration established several economic and social terms for promoting peace and social justice in South Vietnam.

- Agricultural education for new species of corn, rice, and vegetable seeds
- Construction projects for rural Vietnam
- Control economic inflation
- Enhance education and health programs
- Safeguard refugees from communist aggressors by providing care and education for South Vietnamese children and families

== 1966 Honolulu Conference ==
Meeting with South Vietnam Government Diplomats

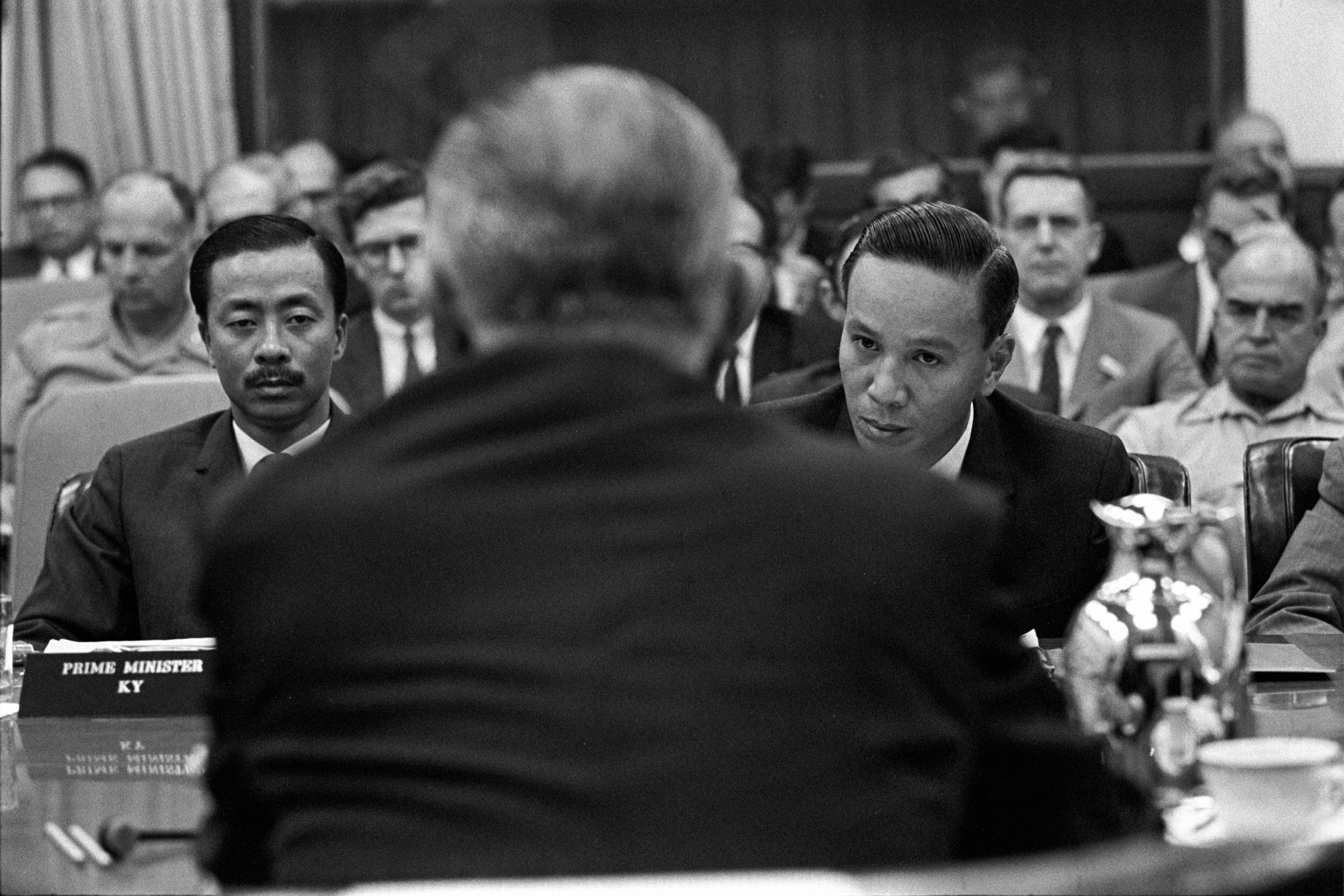
Honolulu Conference: Prime Minister Nguyen Cao Ky (South Vietnam) and Lieutenant General Nguyen Van Thieu (South Vietnam)

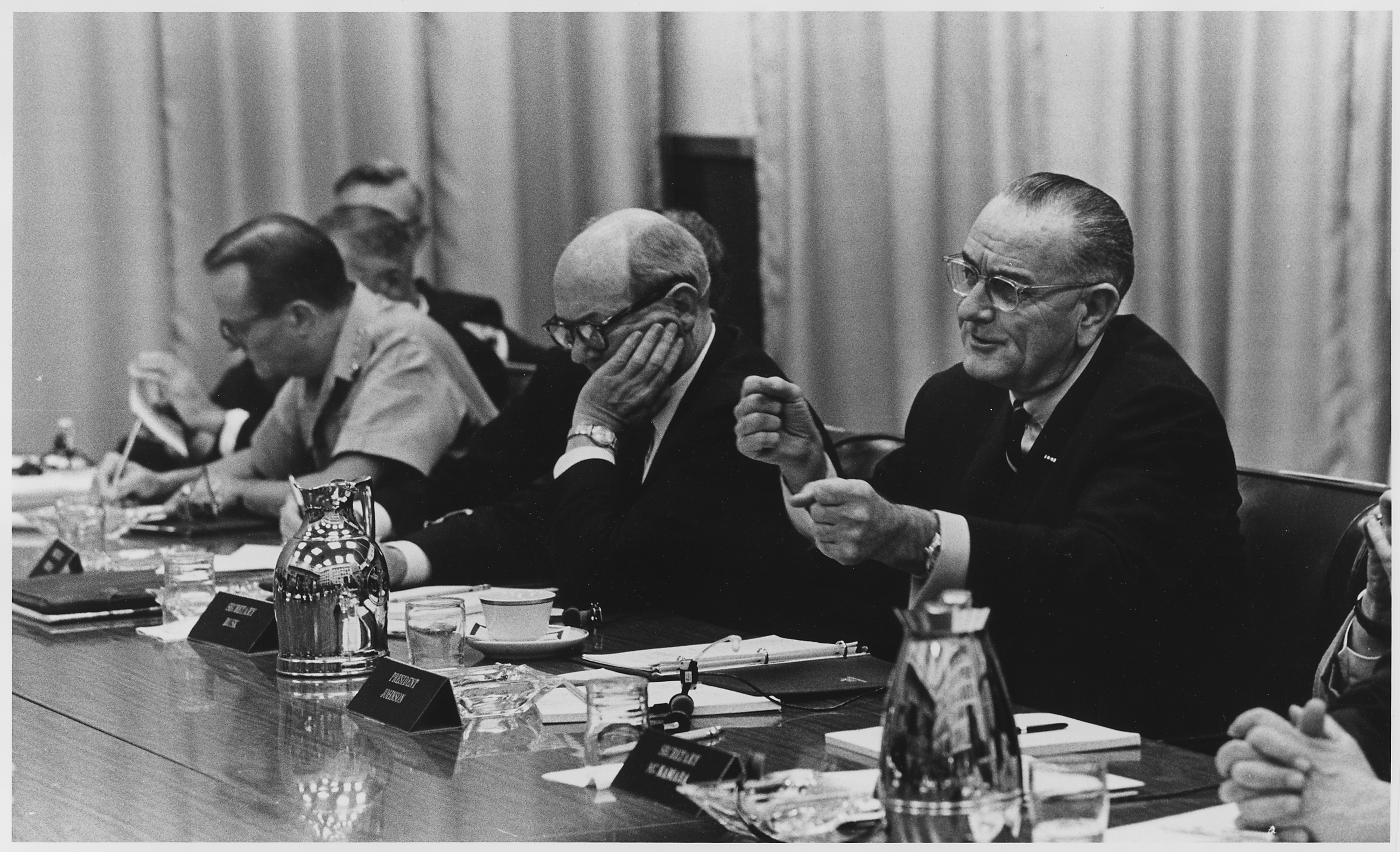
Honolulu Conference: Secretary of State Dean Rusk and President Lyndon B. Johnson at the table

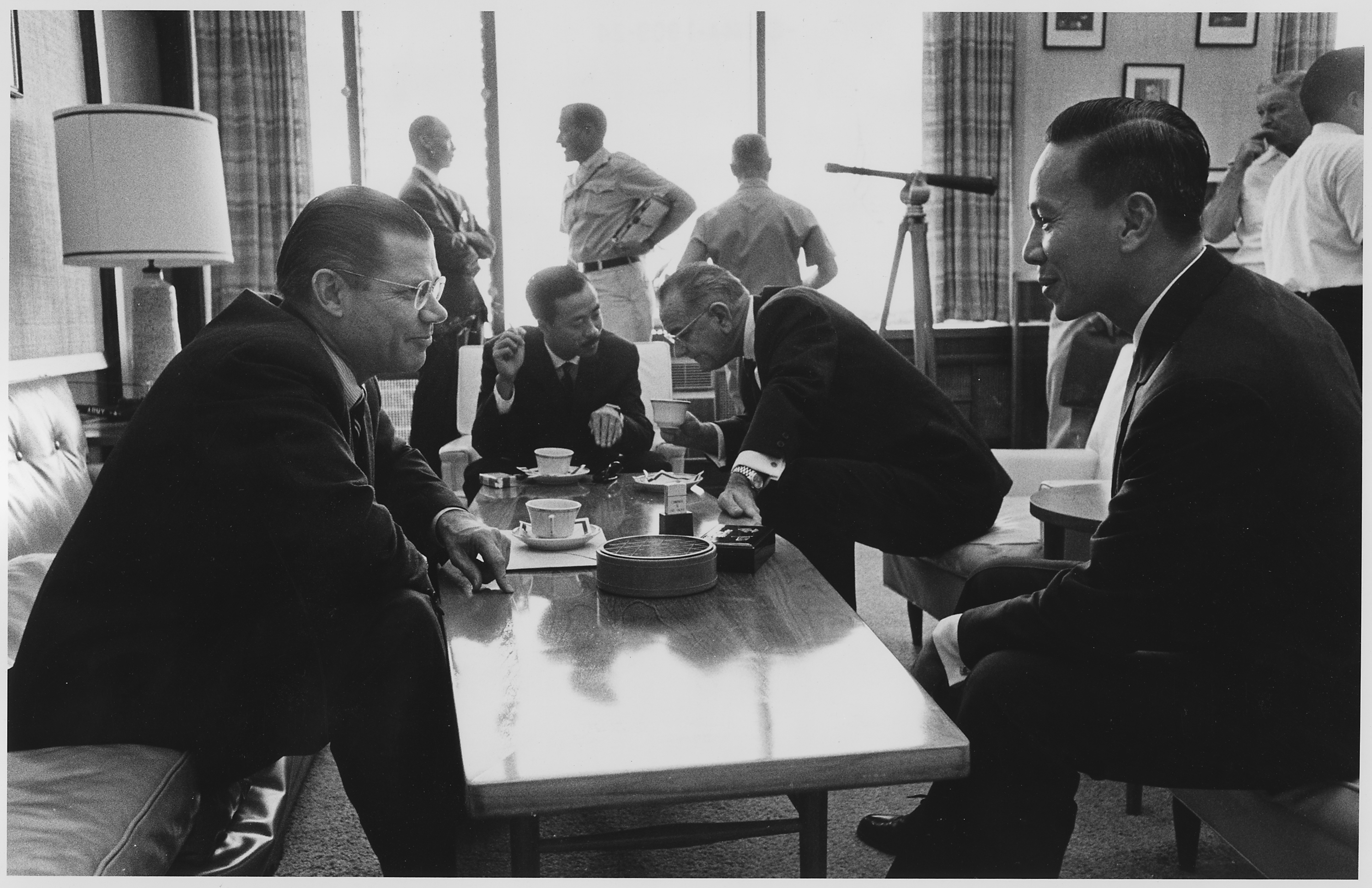
Honolulu Conference: Secretary of Defense Robert McNamara, Prime Minister Nguyen Cao Ky (South Vietnam), President Lyndon B. Johnson and Lieutenant General Nguyen Van Thieu (South Vietnam)

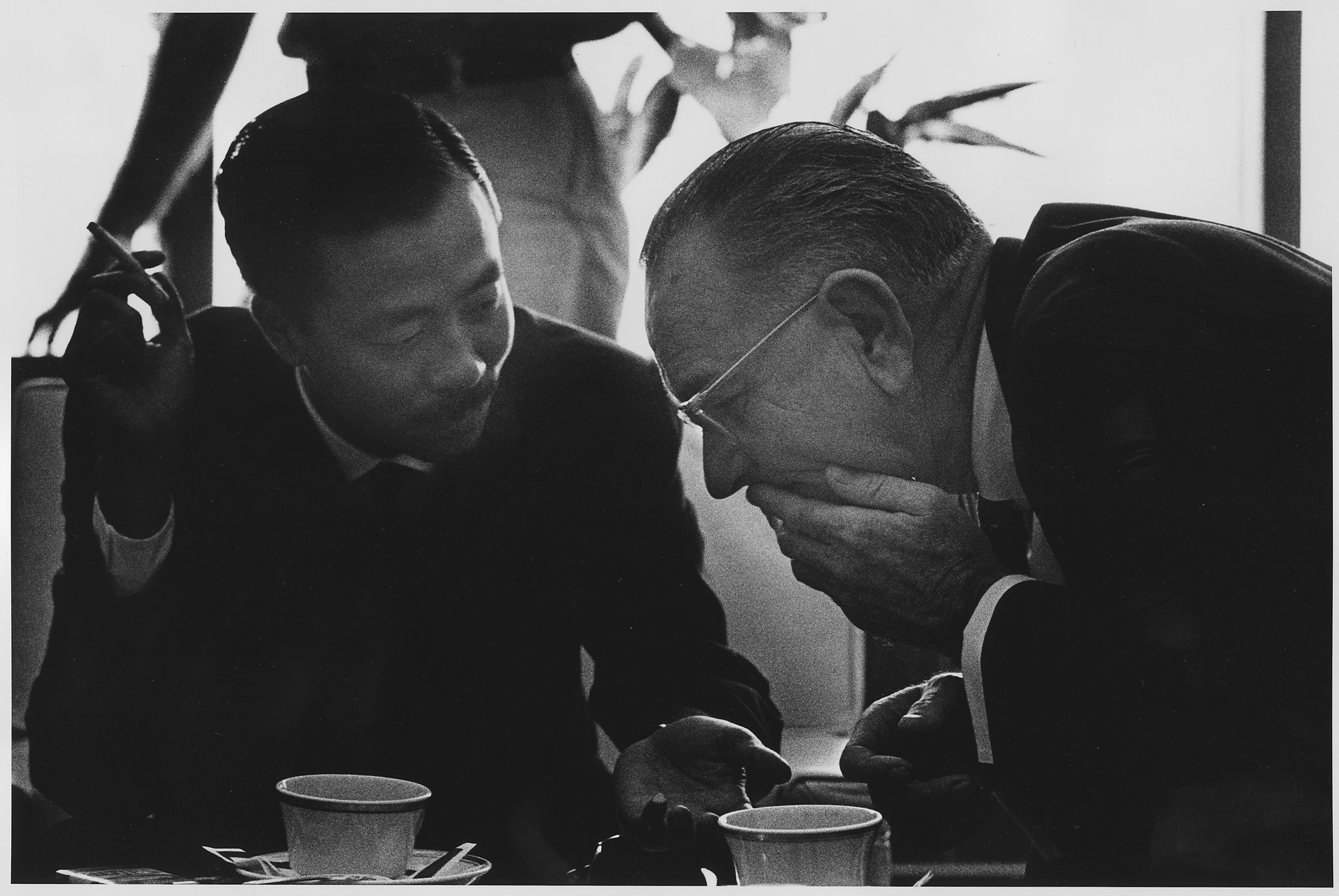
Vice President Nguyen Cao Ky (South Vietnam) and President Lyndon B. Johnson

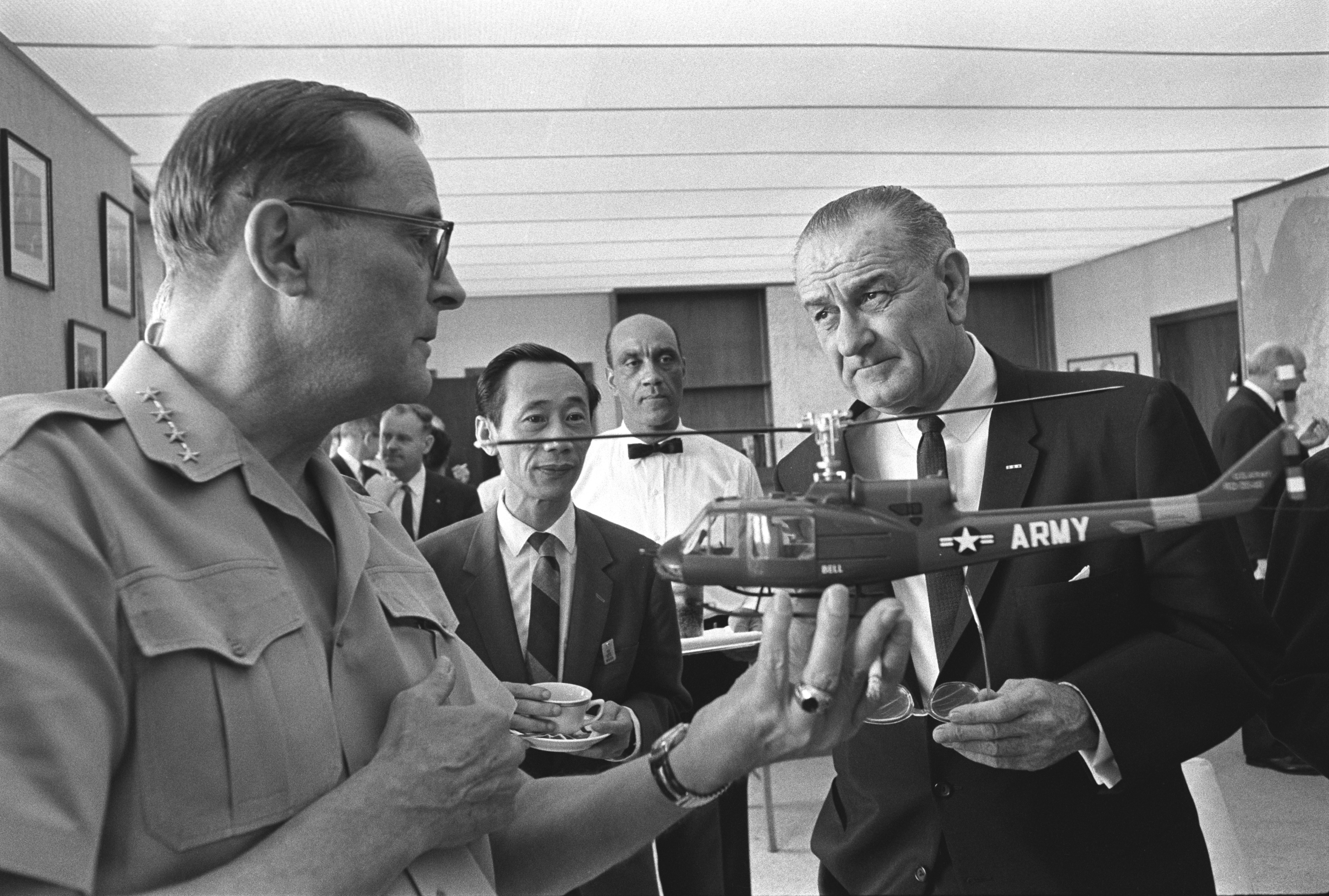
General Earle Wheeler holding up a model of a U.S. Army helicopter as Ambassador Vu Van Thai and President Lyndon B. Johnson look on.

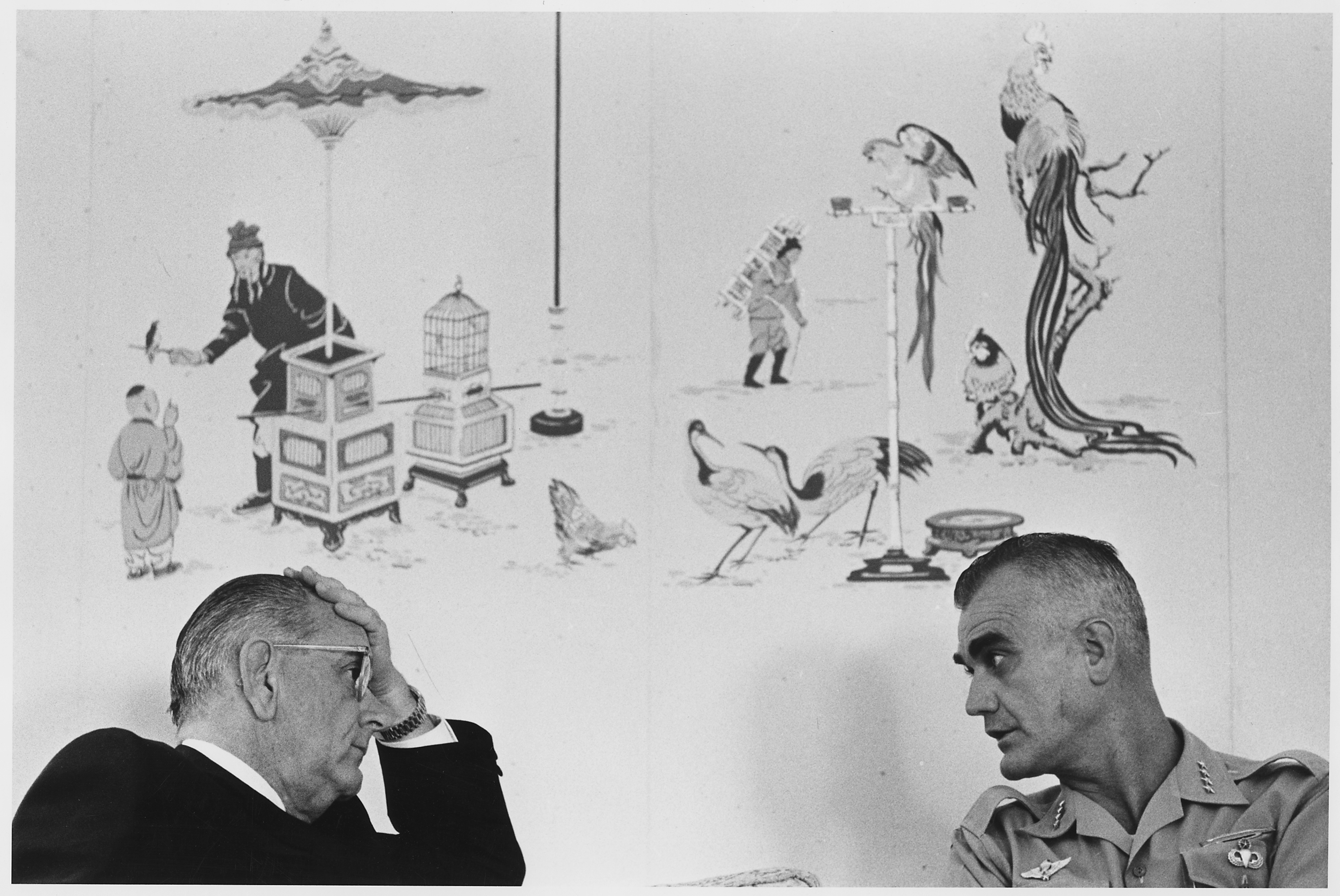
General William Westmoreland and President Lyndon B. Johnson at the Honolulu Conference

== Results ==
The main result of the conference was very far from what Johnson wanted. South Vietnam by 1965 devolved into almost feudal state, becoming an alliance of warlords as each corps commander ruled his own area as his own fiefdom. Johnson's remarks to Kỳ praising him as a strong leader at the conference persuaded the latter that he now had the support of the United States to assert the authority of the national government over the warlords. In particular, Kỳ wanted to bring down General Nguyễn Chánh Thi, the commander of I Corps, who ruled northern South Vietnam as his fiefdom. The attempt to dismiss Thi led to the Buddhist Uprising of 1966, which left American officials stunned by "the civil war within the civil war" as the South Vietnamese troops loyal to Thi fought against South Vietnamese troops loyal to Kỳ.

== North Vietnam Negotiation Proposal of 1967 ==
United States President Lyndon Johnson presented a personal letter to North Vietnam through the Embassy of Vietnam in Moscow on February 8, 1967. President Johnson petitioned the North Vietnamese leadership to discuss a Tet cease-fire for the upcoming 1968 new year observance and a bilateral conference to encourage a resolve for the Vietnam civil conflict.

Democratic Republic of Vietnam President Ho Chi Minh rejected President Johnson's sit-down proposal on February 15, 1967. The North Vietnam President Minh stated, the Vietnamese people would never accept conversation under the clear threat of bombs.

== Honolulu Conference of 1968 ==
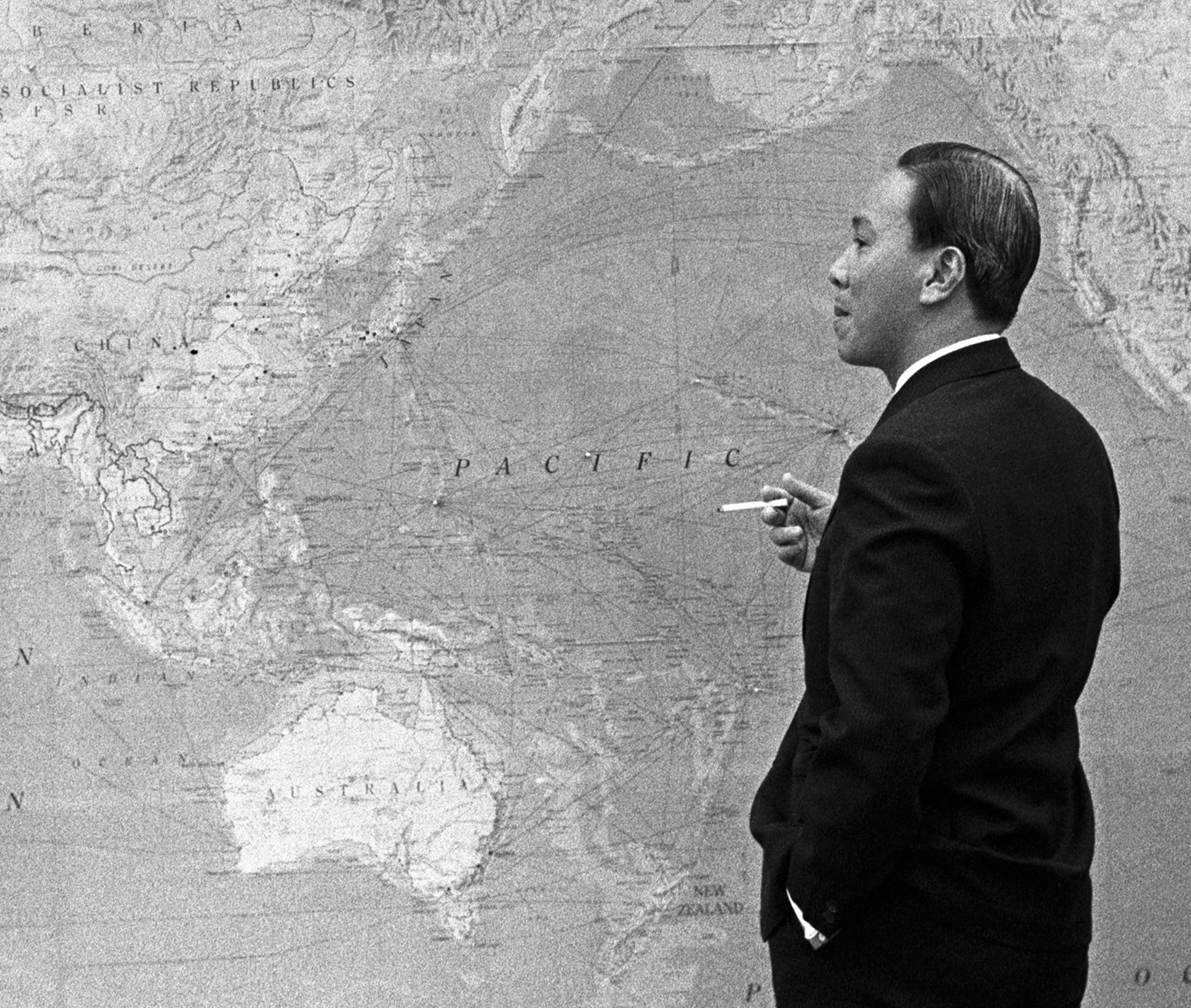
Nguyễn Văn Thiệu

U.S. President Lyndon Johnson and South Vietnam President Nguyễn Văn Thiệu convened a diplomatic conference in Honolulu on July 19 through July 20, 1968. President Johnson arrived on July 18, 1968 at Hickam Air Force Base where a welcome statement was presented to President Thiệu of South Vietnam. The foreign affairs meeting was held by suggestion of the South Vietnamese President Nguyễn Văn Thiệu to discuss recent events South of the Seventeenth parallel and the imminent Paris Peace Accords. The international leaders discussed the current North Vietnamese coordinated military maneuvers during the Vietnamese Lunar New Year in early 1968. President Johnson emphasized the United States apprehension about the Army of the Republic of Vietnam troop levels, Tet Offensive, and the infiltration efforts escalated by the People's Army of Vietnam.

== See also ==
- 1967 Opium War
- Legality of the Vietnam War
- Communism in Vietnam
- McNamara Line
- Military Assistance Advisory Group
- Paris Peace Accords

== Books ==
- U.S. Department of Defense (December 6, 1962). A Pocket Guide to Vietnam, 1962. Bodleian Library. ISBN 978-1851242856. OCLC 894956014.
- Karnow, Stanley (1983). Vietnam: A History. New York, NY: Viking Press. ISBN 978-0670746040. OCLC 9646422.
- Moïse, Edwin E. (1996). Tonkin Gulf and the Escalation of the Vietnam War. Chapel Hill, North Carolina: University of North Carolina Press. ISBN 978-0807823002. OCLC 34477141.
- Langguth, A.J. (November 15, 2000). Our Vietnam: The War 1954-1975. New York: Simon and Schuster. ISBN 0-7432-1231-2. OCLC 44509372.
- Wilkins, Warren (2011). Grab Their Belts to Fight Them: The Viet Cong's Big-unit War Against the U.S., 1965-1966. Annapolis, Maryland: Naval Institute Press. ISBN 978-1591149613. OCLC 734093890.

== Historical Video Archives ==
- "Death of a Regime". Internet Archive. U.S. National Archives. 1963.
- "Why Vietnam?". Internet Archive. U.S. Department of Defense. 1965.
- "Man of the Month". Internet Archive. U.S. National Archives. 1966.
- "The People Fight Back". Internet Archive. U.S. National Archives. 1966.
- Lyndon B. Johnson's Speech on The Vietnam War 1966 on YouTube
- Beyond the War (The Honolulu Conference) Feb. 5-8, 1966. MP799 on YouTube
- President Johnson Honolulu Mission On Vietnam (1966) on YouTube
- "Interview With Nguyen Van Hieu". Internet Archive. U.S. National Archives. 1968.
