= Camp H. M. Smith =

US Marine Corps base in Oahu, Hawaii

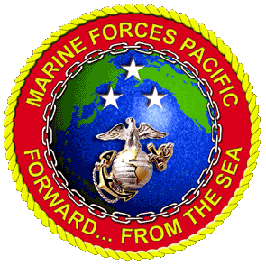
Camp H. M. Smith

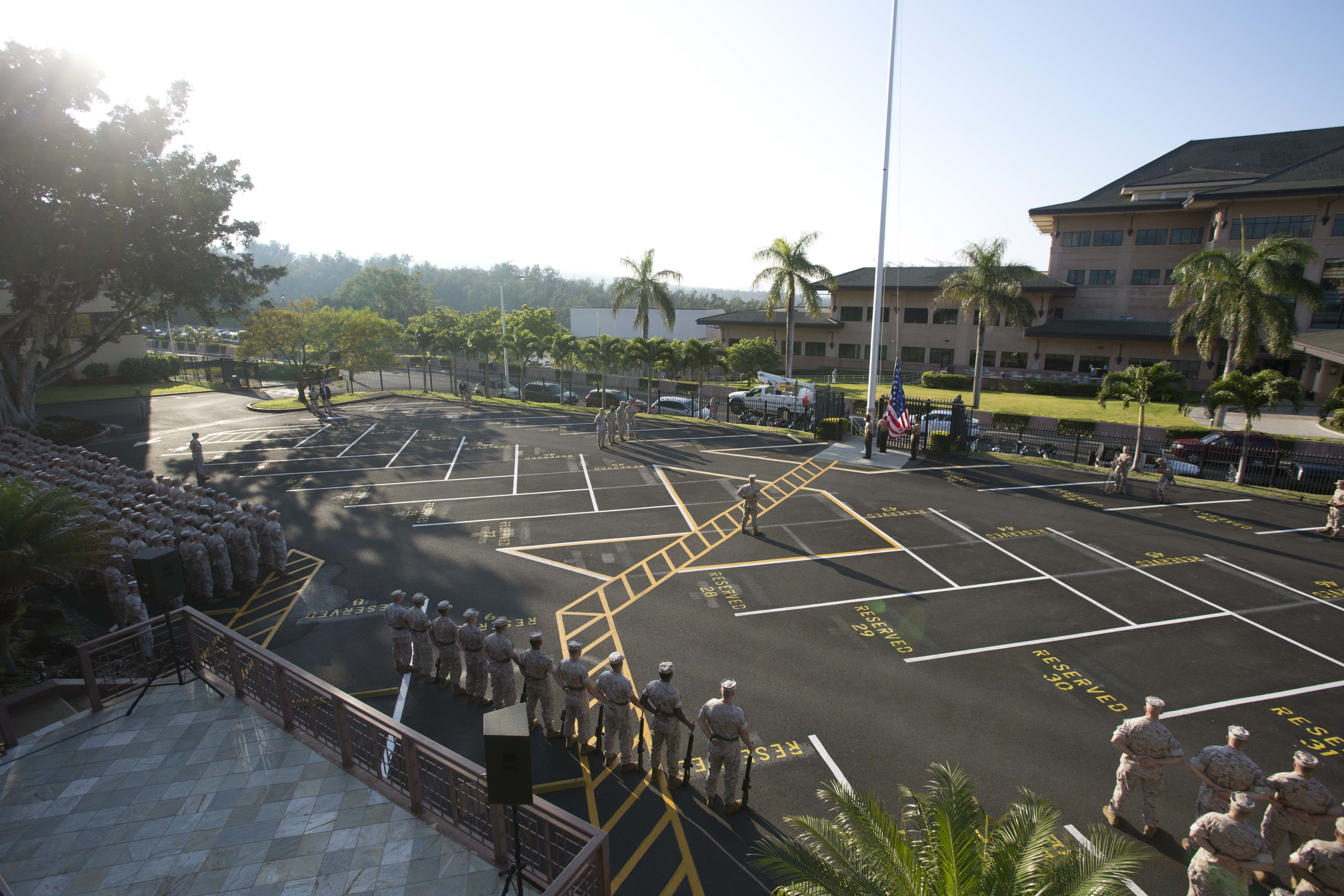
- Commandant of the Marine Corps Gen. Joseph Dunford and Sergeant Major of the Marine Corps Sgt. Maj. Ronald L. Green visit Camp H.M. Smith in 2015

Site information
- Owner: United States Department of Defense

Location
- Coordinates: 21°23′09″N 157°54′23″W
- Area: 220 acres (0.89 km^{2})

Garrison information
- Garrison: Headquarters, United States Pacific Command; Special Operations Command Pacific; Marine Forces Pacific

Camp H. M. Smith is a United States Marine Corps installation in the Halawa census-designated place on the island of Oahu, Hawaii, near the community of Halawa (ha-LA-va) Heights. It is the headquarters of the United States Pacific Command (USPACOM), Special Operations Command Pacific, and Marine Forces Pacific, the Marine service component command of USPACOM.

The camp, originally the Aiea Naval Hospital, was named for General Holland McTyeire Smith, the first commanding general of Fleet Marine Force Pacific, on June 8, 1955. The initials H. M. also stood for his nickname which was "Howling Mad" referring to his temper and given to him by his Marines.

== History ==
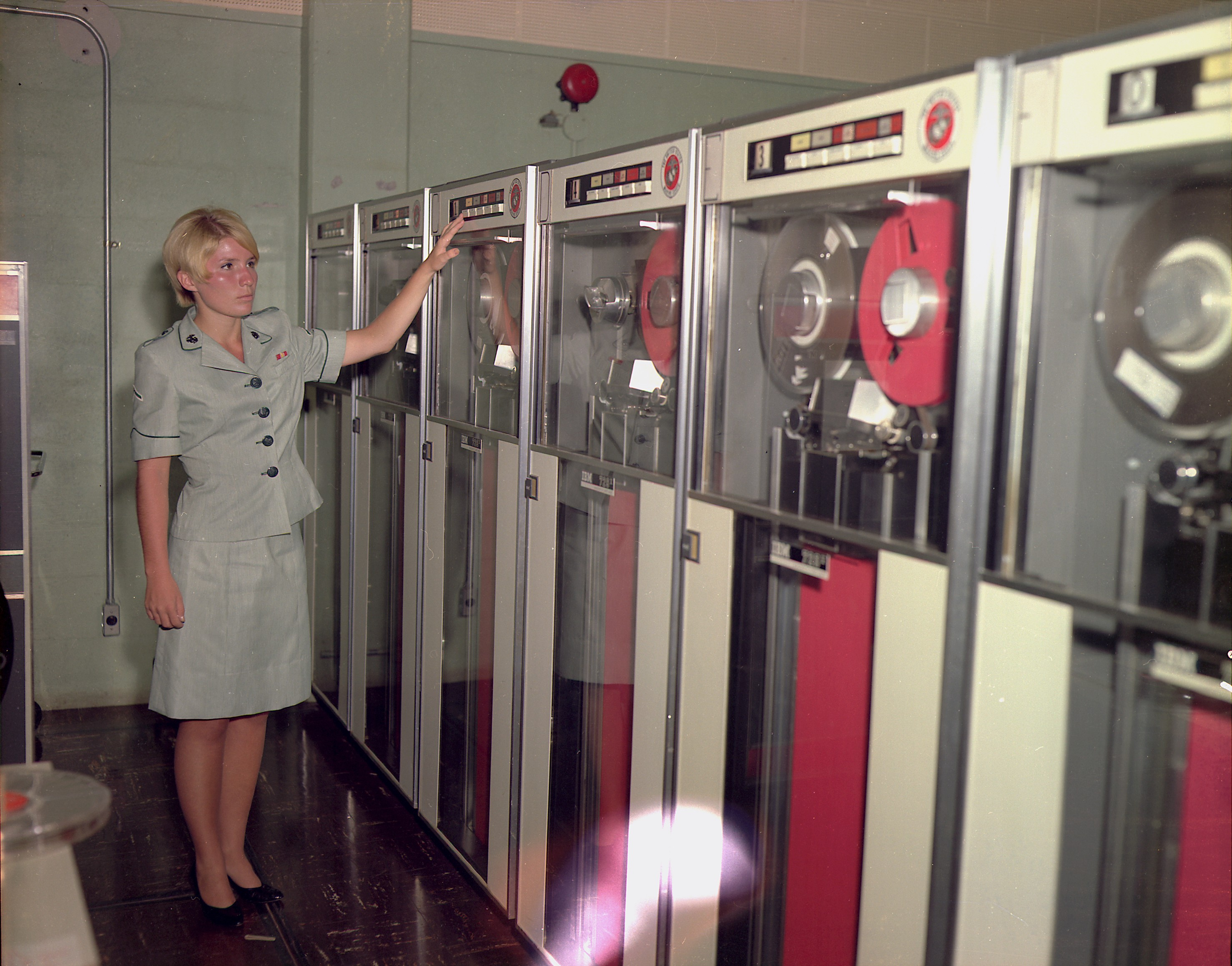
IBM 729 computer tape drive, circa 1969

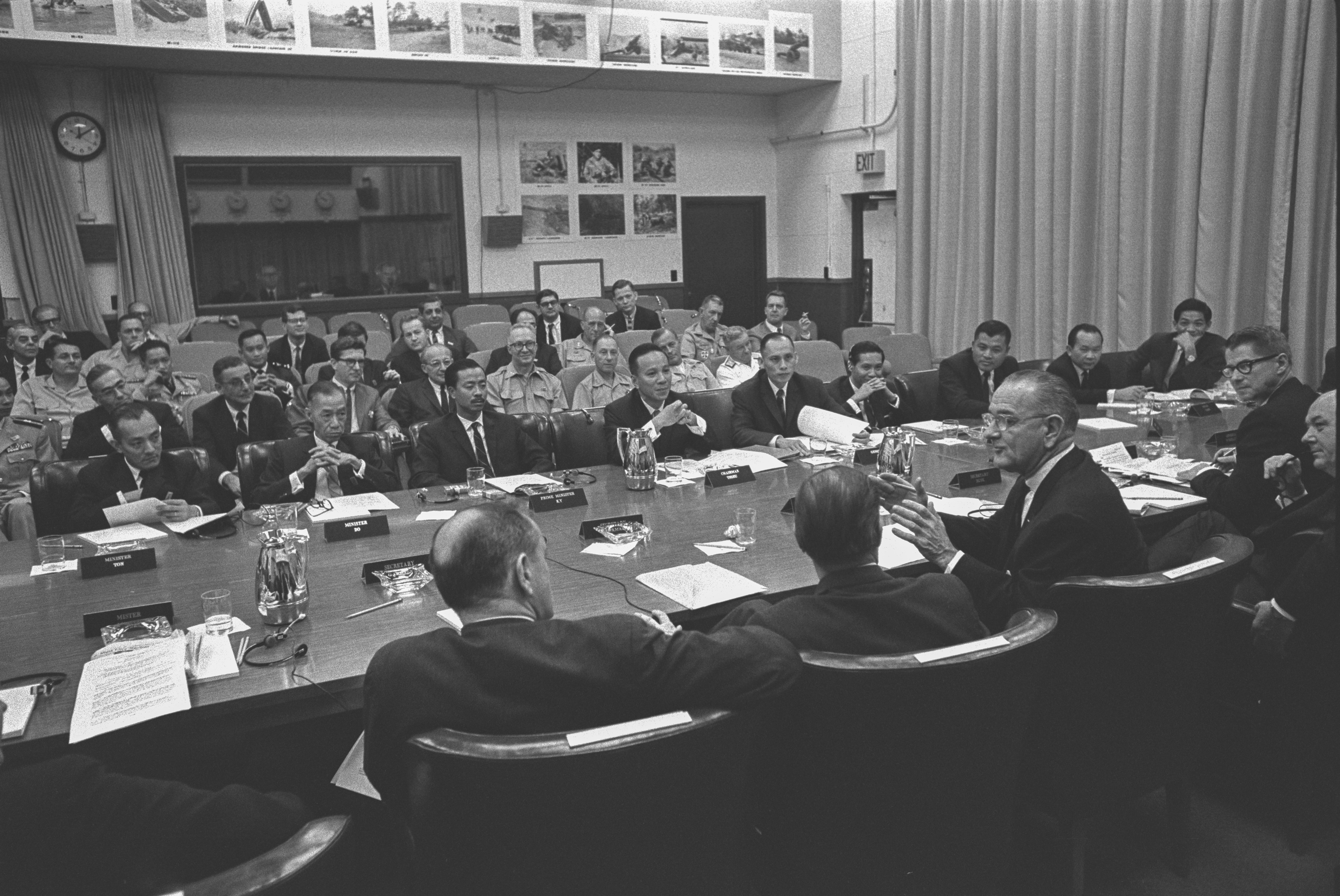
Lyndon B. Johnson and others at the Declaration of Honolulu at Camp Smith, February 8, 1966.

An Act of Congress on 17 March 1941 had approved purchase of the site, then a sugar cane field, for a Navy Hospital. In 1941, the investment for the 220½ acres of Camp Smith land, in fee simple (a term for owning both the land and the buildings), was $912,000, and improvements cost an additional $14 million. Work commenced in July and progressed slowly. Following the attack on Pearl Harbor on December 7, construction of the planned 1,650-bed facility was rushed to completion. With Admiral Chester W. Nimitz in attendance, the hospital was commissioned on November 11, 1942, but continued expansion was necessary.

Throughout World War II, the Aiea Naval Hospital served as a stopping off place for thousands of wounded sailors and Marines on their way home from the war in the Pacific. Hospital activity peaked following the battle for Iwo Jima in February and March, 1945, when 5,676 patients received medical care simultaneously.

On June 1, 1949, the hospital was deactivated and Army and Navy medical facilities were consolidated at what is now the Tripler Army Medical Center. In 1950, the Territory of Hawaii began negotiations to obtain the Aiea facility for a tuberculosis sanitarium.

In 1955, however, the Marine Corps selected the site as the home of the Fleet Marine Force Pacific. The first Marines took up residence in October 1955; the headquarters staff placed the camp in full operation just two weeks before its dedication on January 31, 1956.

In October 1957, Camp Smith also became the headquarters for the Commander in Chief, U.S. Pacific Command, who formerly shared the headquarters of the Commander in Chief, U.S. Pacific Fleet at Makalapa, near Pearl Harbor. Both commands were headed by the same officer until 13 January 1958, when a separate officer was named to serve as Commander in Chief, Pacific Fleet. In July 1992, FMFPac was further designated as the component command, Marine Forces Pacific. In April 1994, Marine Corps Base Hawaii assumed operational responsibility for Camp H. M. Smith.

Camp Smith today consists of 220 acres (0.89 km^{2}) at Camp Smith proper, 137 acres (0.55 km^{2}) at Puuloa Rifle Range in Ewa Beach, and 62 acres (250,000 m^{2}) in Manana Housing. Camp Smith is unique in that it is the only Marine Corps installation that supports a unified commander, Commander, Indo-Pacific Command (CDRUSINDOPACOM).
