= 1965 Philippine Sea A-4 incident =

Nuclear weapon loss incident

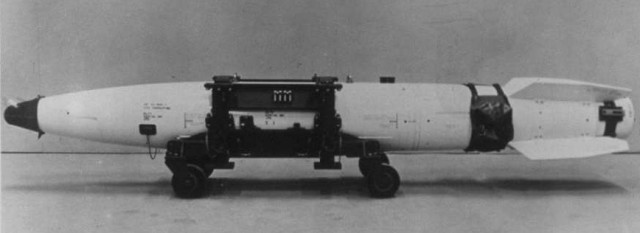
- A MK43 free-fall nuclear weapon on a handling dolly

Incident
- Date: December 5, 1965
- Summary: Pre-flight human error
- Site: Philippine Sea; 27°33.2′N 131°19.3′E
- Aircraft type: Douglas A-4E Skyhawk
- Operator: Attack Squadron VA-56; Carrier Air Wing Five
- Registration: BuNo 151022
- Fatalities: 1 Pilot (LTJG Douglas M. Webster)

The 1965 Philippine Sea A-4 crash was a Broken Arrow incident in which a United States Navy Douglas A-4E Skyhawk attack aircraft carrying a nuclear weapon fell into the sea off Japan from the aircraft carrier USS Ticonderoga. The aircraft, pilot and weapon were never recovered.

== The accident ==
On 5 December 1965, 31 days after Ticonderoga's departure from U.S. Naval Base Subic Bay in the Philippines, the attack jet was pushed backwards over the side, off the number 2 elevator during a training exercise while being rolled from the number 2 hangar bay to the elevator. The pilot, Lieutenant (junior grade) Douglas M. Webster; the aircraft, Douglas A-4E BuNo 151022 of VA-56; and the B43 nuclear bomb were never recovered from the 16,000 ft (4,900 m) depth. The accident was said to occur 68 miles (59 nmi; 109 km) from Kikai Island, Kagoshima Prefecture, Japan.

Ticonderoga had aboard Carrier Air Wing Five during this cruise, with two squadrons of Skyhawks. The lost aircraft was part of Attack Squadron 56 (VA-56); VA-144 was the other.

== Number of weapons ==
Though most sources state that a single weapon was involved, a document from Los Alamos National Lab indicates that two weapons were involved.

== Revelation ==
It was not until 1989 that the United States Department of Defense revealed the proximity of the lost one-megaton H-bomb to Japanese territory. The revelation inspired a diplomatic inquiry from Japan requesting details.

== See also ==
- Broken Arrow (nuclear)
- List of military nuclear accidents
