= VA-56 (U.S. Navy) =

Attack Squadron 56
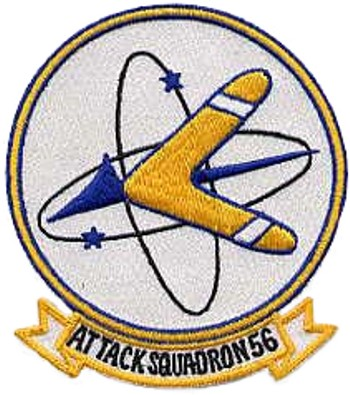
- VA-56 squadron patch
- Active: 4 June 1956 – 31 August 1986
- Country: United States
- Branch: United States Navy
- Role: Attack aircraft
- Part of: Inactive
- Nickname(s): Boomerangs; Champions
- Engagements: Vietnam War

Aircraft flown
- Attack: F9F Panther; F9F Cougar; FJ-4 Fury; A-4 Skyhawk; A-7 Corsair II

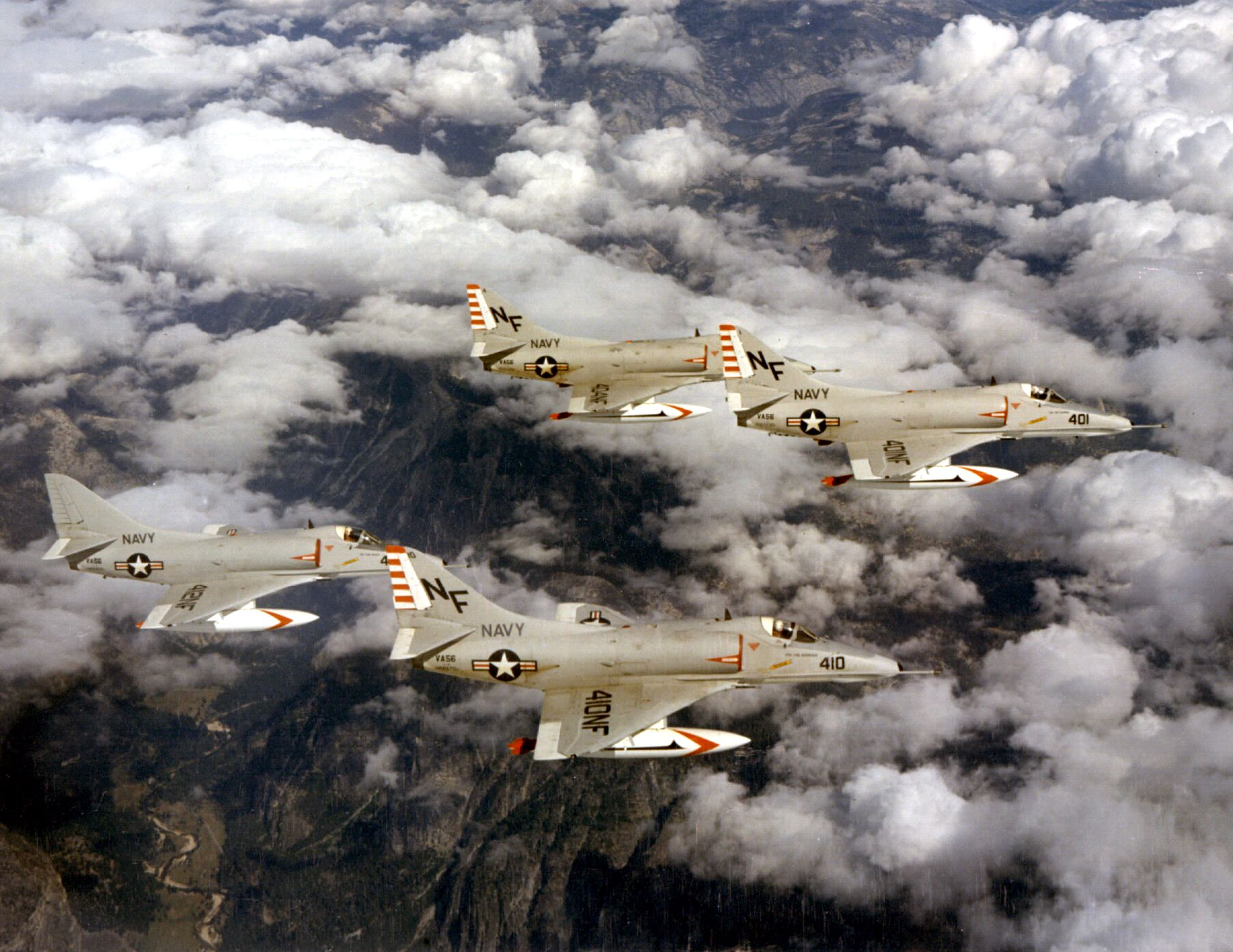
Four VA-56 A-4Es, mid-1960s

VA-56 was an Attack Squadron of the U.S. Navy. It was established on 4 June 1956, and disestablished thirty years later, on 31 August 1986. The squadron's nickname was the Boomerangs from 1957 to 1958, and the Champions thereafter.

== Operational history ==
- 25–31 October 1961: VA-56 participated in Operation Crosstie with HMS Victorious, conducting flight operations from the deck of Victorious to evaluate the compatibility of USN/RN aircraft, armament, and handling facilities.
- 16 July–15 September 1962: The squadron was embarked in USS Constellation during her transit from the East Coast, via Cape Horn, to her new home port on the West Coast.
- July 1964: VA-56's A-4E Skyhawks participated in Yankee Team operations, providing aerial refueling support and experimenting with the tactic of employing A-4Es as armed escorts for the RF-8 and RA-3 reconnaissance aircraft flying missions over Laos and South Vietnam to detect Communist military presence and operations.
- 2–4 August 1964: During a DESOTO patrol mission (intelligence collection missions begun in 1962) USS Maddox was attacked by three motor torpedo boats on 2 August off the coast of North Vietnam. Following this incident, the squadron flew sorties in support of the destroyers on Desoto Patrol.
- 5 August 1964: VA-56 A-4s participated in Operation Pierce Arrow, retaliatory strikes against the North Vietnamese. Along with other aircraft from CVW-5, they were part of the first sortie that struck the antiaircraft gun emplacements at the Vinh oil storage facility. Ninety percent of the complex was destroyed by the sorties flown against this facility. The squadron also participated in strikes against the Bến Thuỷ naval base, resulting in the sinking and destruction of several torpedo boats.
- 10–29 October, 1–5 and 22–28 November 1964: The squadron continued to participate in Yankee Team operations off the coast of Vietnam.
- 5 December 1965: A squadron A-4E carrying a B43 nuclear bomb fell over the side off USS Ticonderoga during a training exercise 80 miles (130 km) from Okinawa, while being rolled from the number 2 hangar bay to the number 2 elevator. The pilot, Lieutenant (junior grade) Douglas M. Webster, his A-4E BuNo 151022 and the bomb were never recovered from the 16,000 ft (4,900 m) depth.
- 7 February 1966: Lieutenant Commander Render Crayton was awarded the Silver Star (in absentia) for his actions while engaged in a combat mission over North Vietnam, he was released during Operation Homecoming in February 1973
- 10 June 1967: The squadron's commanding officer, Commander Peter Sherman, failed to return from a strike in North Vietnam and was listed as missing in action until his remains were identified in January 1991.
- January–February 1968: While embarked on USS Enterprise and en route to Yankee Station, the carrier was ordered to the Sea of Japan for operations following the seizure of USS Pueblo by the North Koreans on 23 January.
- 19 June 1968: Lieutenant Commander Crater received the Silver Star for his actions in coordinating the successful night rescue of a downed F-4 crewman in North Vietnam. This action was part of the rescue operations in which Lieutenant Lassen, a helicopter pilot and not a member of VA-56, received the Medal of Honor for his exploits.
- 1 November 1968: The squadron's last A-4E Skyhawk was transferred and training began for the transition to the A-7 Corsair II.
- April 1971 - November 1971 with CVW-5 aboard USS Midway (CVA 41) A7B Deployed to Vietnam.
- May 1972: On 12 May USS Midway, with VA-56 embarked, shifted its operations from the area of An Lộc, South Vietnam to targets in North Vietnam. It participated in Operation Pocket Money, the mining and interdiction of Haiphong Harbor and North Vietnam's extensive coastal waterway system, which was initiated on 9 May by squadrons from USS Kitty Hawk and USS Coral Sea. It also participated in Operation Linebacker, the concentration of heavy strikes against targets in North Vietnam to interdict the flow of supplies into the country and reduce its ability to prosecute the war. Linebacker operations lasted until 22 October.
- 29–30 April 1975: Midway, including elements of VA-56, participated in Operation Frequent Wind, the evacuation of American citizens from Saigon, South Vietnam.
- August 1976: VA-56, embarked on Midway, operated in Korean waters following the Axe murder incident.
- April–May 1979: Midway, with VA-56 embarked, deployed to the Gulf of Aden to relieve USS Constellation and maintain a U.S. carrier presence following the outbreak of fighting between North and South Yemen and the fall of the Shah of Iran.
- October 1979: As a response to anti-American demonstrations in Iran, Midway and its air wing, including VA-56, were ordered to deploy to the Indian Ocean for the second time in 1979.
- November 1979–February 1980: Following the Iranian seizure of the American Embassy in Tehran and the taking of American hostages on 4 November, Midway proceeded to the Gulf of Oman and remained on station until relieved in early February 1980.
- May–June 1980: Midway, with VA-56 embarked, operated off the coast of Korea due to the civil unrest in South Korea and the Gwangju massacre.
- May 1986: The squadron was reassigned to NAS Lemoore as a result of the change in CVW-5's composition from A-7 and F-4 aircraft to FA-18A. It began the transfer of its personnel and aircraft in preparation for the disestablishment of the squadron on 31 August.

== Home port assignments ==
The squadron was assigned to these home ports, effective on the dates shown:

- NAS Miramar – 4 June 1956
- NAS Lemoore – 30 June 1961
- NAF Atsugi / NS Yokosuka / USS Midway* – 30 June 1973
- NAS Lemoore – May 1986

* Under the Overseas Home Port Program, VA-56 and CVW-5 were permanently based aboard Midway and home ported with her at Naval Station Yokosuka, Japan. The home port was officially changed on 30 June 1973. However, Midway did not arrive in Japan until 5 October. Elements of VA-56, when not operating from Midway, were based ashore at NAF Atsugi or Misawa, Japan.

== Aircraft assignment ==
The squadron first received the following aircraft on the dates shown:

- F9F-3 Panther – June 1956
- F9F-8B Cougar – July 1956
- F9F-8 Cougar – October 1956
- FJ-4B Fury – 29 May 1958
- A4D-1 Skyhawk – 23 December 1958
- A4D-2/A-4B Skyhawk – April 1959
- A-4E Skyhawk – 15 July 1963
- A-4C Skyhawk – 23 July 1966
- A-4E Skyhawk – 18 August 1967
- A-7B Corsair II – January 1969
- A-7A Corsair II – March 1973
- A-7E Corsair II – 24 April 1977

== See also ==
- Attack aircraft
- List of inactive United States Navy aircraft squadrons
- History of the United States Navy
