= Operation Pierce Arrow =

Part of the Vietnam War (1964)

- Part of the Vietnam War
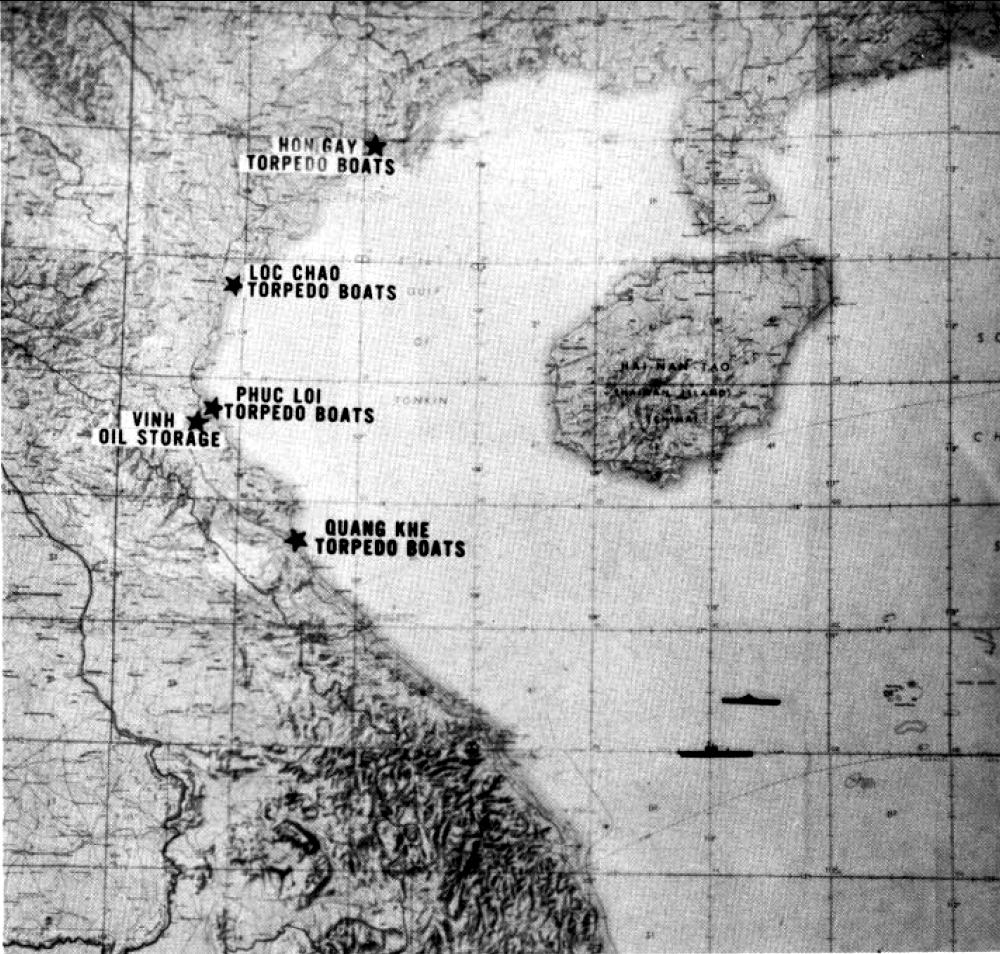
- Targets of Operation Pierce Arrow
Date	5 August 1964
Location	North Vietnam

Belligerents
United States	North Vietnam

Commanders and leaders
Lyndon B. Johnson; Robert McNamara	

Operation Pierce Arrow was a U.S. bombing campaign at the beginning of the Vietnam War.

In response to the Gulf of Tonkin incident when the destroyers USS Maddox and USS Turner Joy of the United States Navy engaged North Vietnamese ships, sustaining light damage as they gathered electronic intelligence while in the international waters of the Gulf of Tonkin, U.S. President Lyndon B. Johnson ordered Operation "Pierce Arrow" which was conducted on 5 August 1964.

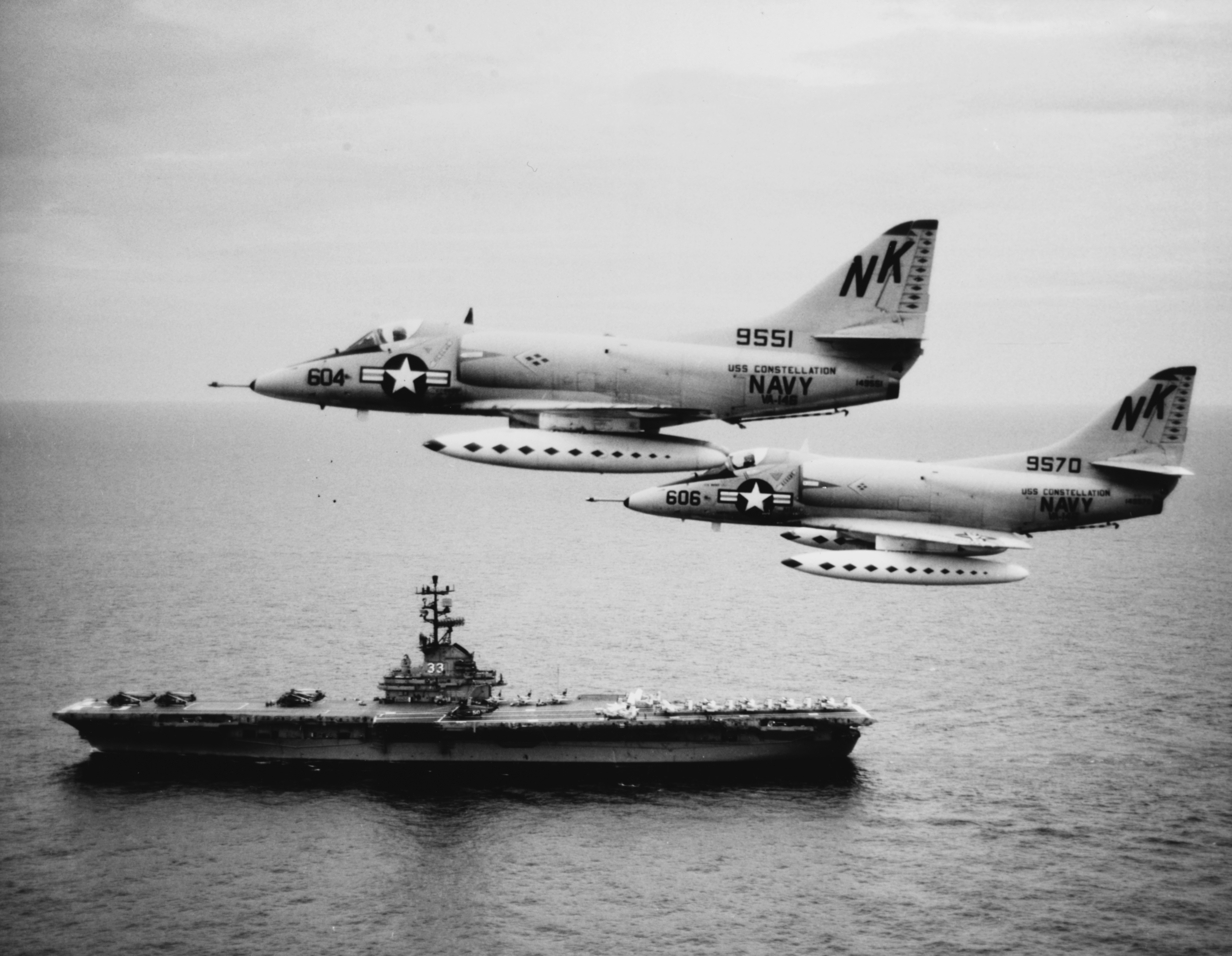
VA-146 A-4Cs from USS Constellation a week after Operation Pierce Arrow.

The operation consisted of 64 strike sorties of aircraft from the aircraft carriers USS Ticonderoga and USS Constellation against North Vietnamese naval vessels (mostly Swatow gunboats—only two were torpedo boats) and the oil storage depot at Vinh. The U.S. lost two aircraft to anti-aircraft fire, with one pilot killed, Lieutenant Richard Sather, piloting an A-1 Skyraider. Another, Lt. (jg) Everett Alvarez Jr. an A-4 Skyhawk pilot, became the first U.S. Navy prisoner of war in Vietnam. The Soviet-made 14.5mm gun used to shoot down the A4 is now on display in Hanoi at the Air Defence Museum. North Vietnam claimed to have shot down eight U.S. aircraft.

Pilots estimated that the Vinh raid destroyed 10 percent of North Vietnam's entire petroleum storage, together with the destruction of or damage to 29 P-4 torpedo boats or gunboats.

The United States had begun air operations over South Vietnam in 1962 (see Operation Farm Gate). Pierce Arrow was the first extension of those operations to North Vietnam. Operations over North Vietnam would expand greatly in 1965, attempting to destroy the infrastructure, war material, and military units needed by North Vietnam to prosecute the guerrilla war in the South. The air operations following Pierce Arrow would swell so that by war's end, the United States bombing campaign was the longest and heaviest in history. The 7,662,000 tons of bombs dropped in Indochina during the Vietnam War nearly quadrupled the 2,150,000 tons the U.S. had dropped during World War II.
