= Leaders of the Vietnam War =

This article lists anti-communist and communist politicians and military commanders involved in leadership during the Vietnam War.

== Anti-communist forces ==
=== South Vietnam ===
==== Political ====
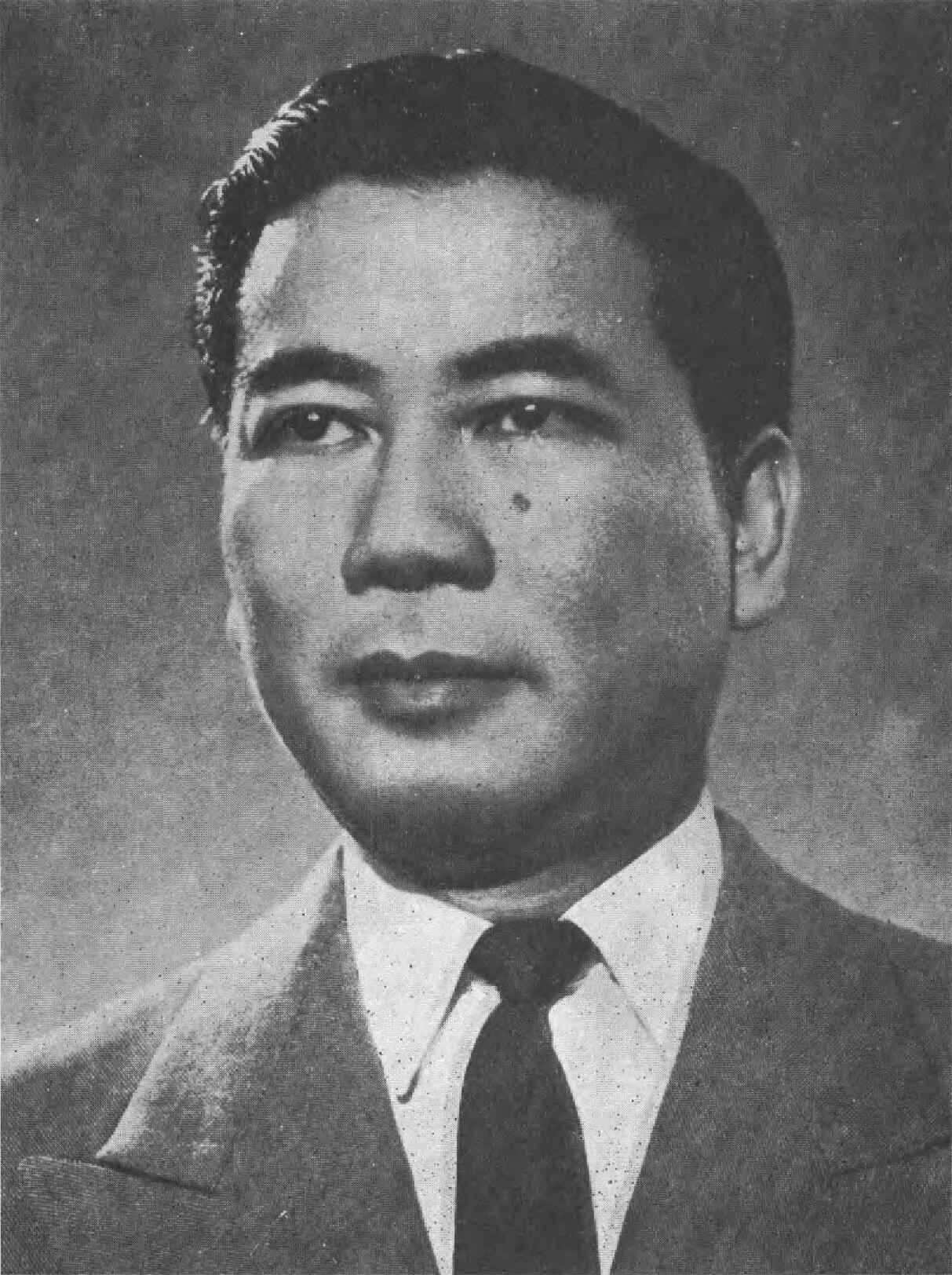
Ngô Đình Diệm

- Ngô Đình Diệm was the President of South Vietnam from 1955 until his assassination in 1963.
- Dương Văn Minh led the Army of the Republic of Vietnam (ARVN) under President Diệm and was briefly leader of South Vietnam in 1963 and 1975. He was the last president of South Vietnam.
- Nguyễn Khánh was an ARVN general who was in power from early 1964 to 1965.
- Nguyễn Văn Thiệu was an ARVN general who became the President of South Vietnam from 1967 to 1975.
- Nguyễn Cao Kỳ was air vice-marshal and commander of the Republic of Vietnam Air Force (RVNAF) until 1967 who became the Prime Minister of South Vietnam from 1965 to 1967 and the Vice President from 1967 to 1971.
- Trần Văn Hương was the second to last President of South Vietnam before its surrender in 1975.
- Trần Thiện Khiêm was the 8th Prime minister of South Vietnam from 1969 to 1975, Minister of National Defence from 1972 to 1975.

==== Military ====
- Cao Văn Viên was an ARVN general who served as chairman of the Joint General Staff from October 1965 to April 1975.
- Hoàng Xuân Lãm was an ARVN general, commander of I Corps (1967–1972).
- Ngô Quang Trưởng was an ARVN general and commander of I Corps (1972–1975).
- Trần Văn Minh was an RVNAF general and RVNAF commander from November 1967 to April 1975.
- Trần Văn Chơn was a Republic of Vietnam Navy rear admiral and navy commander from 1966 to 1974.
- Lê Nguyên Khang was the commander of the Republic of Vietnam Marine Corps.
- Nguyễn Ngọc Loan was commander of the Republic of Vietnam National Police from April 1966 to May 1968.
- Phạm Văn Phú was commander of II Corps.
- Nguyễn Phước Vĩnh Lộc was commander of II Corps and the last chairman of the Joint General Staff.
- Đỗ Cao Trí was commander of III Corps.
- Nguyễn Văn Minh was commander of III Corps.
- Nguyễn Viết Thanh was commander of IV Corps.

=== United States ===
==== Political ====
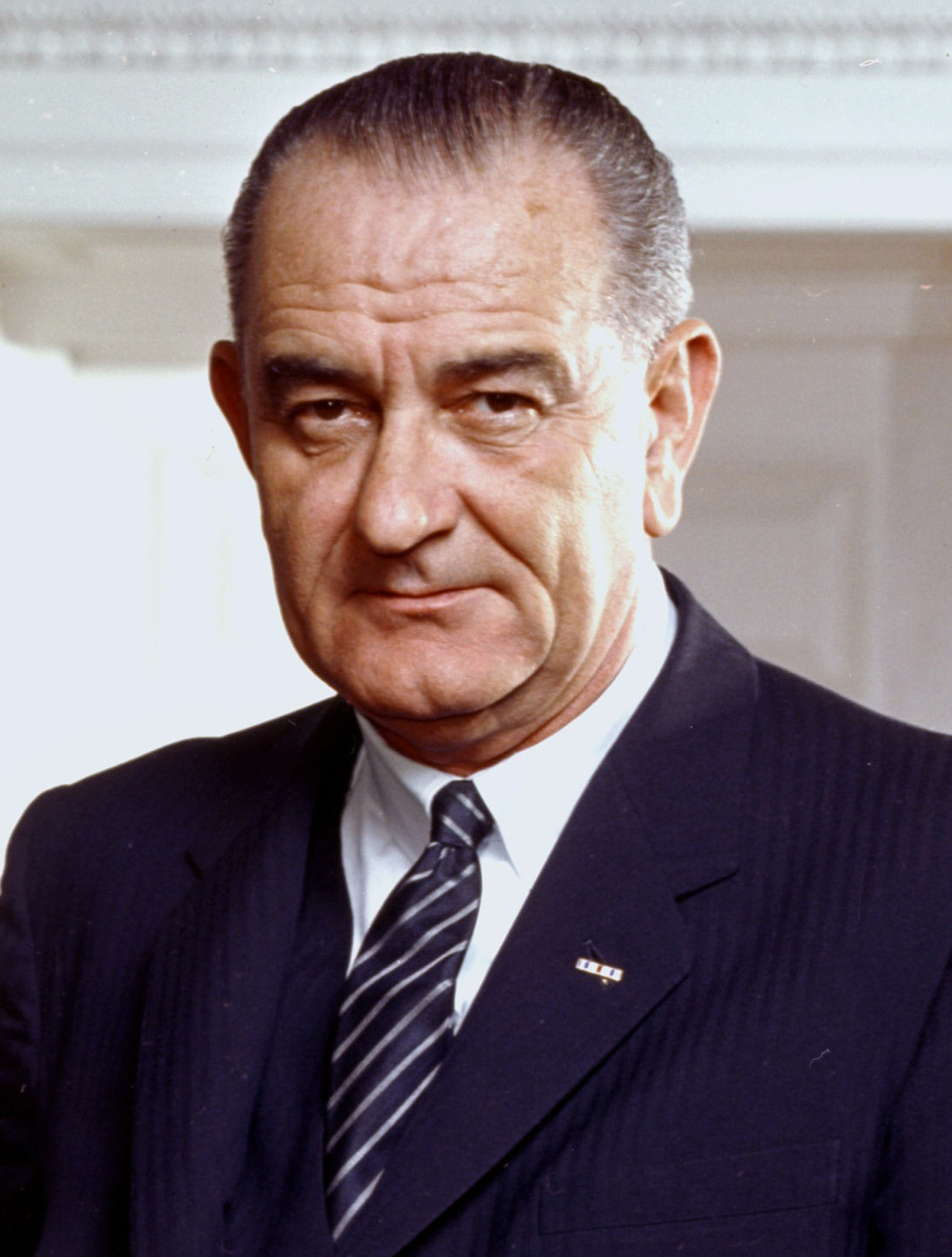
Lyndon B. Johnson

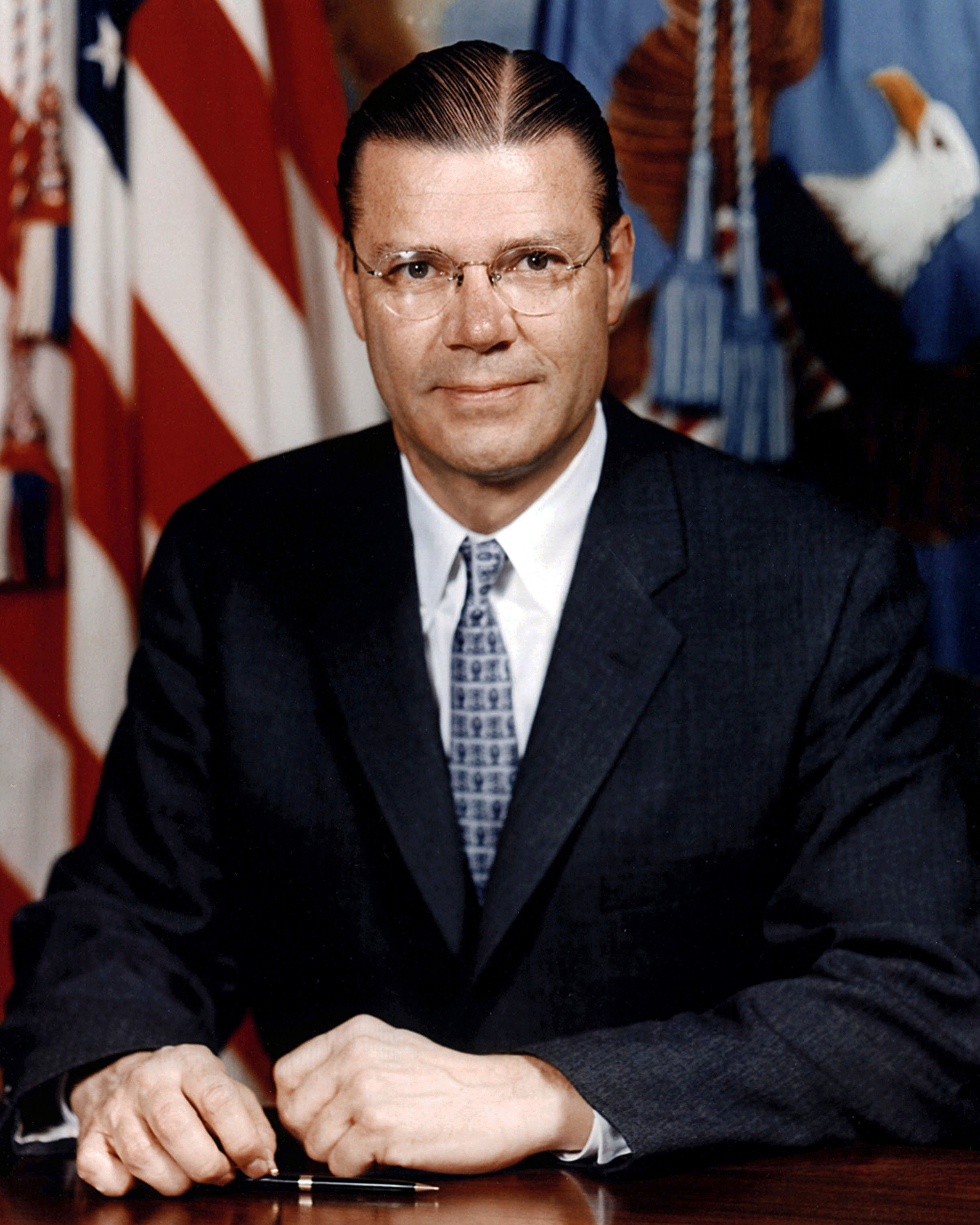
Robert McNamara

- Dwight D. Eisenhower was the 34th President of the United States from 1953 to 1961.
- John F. Kennedy was the 35th President of the United States from 1961 until his assassination in 1963.
- Lyndon B. Johnson was the 36th President of the United States from 1963 to 1969.
- Richard Nixon was the 37th President of the United States from 1969 until he resigned in 1974
- Gerald Ford was the 38th President of the United States from 1974 to 1977.
- Robert McNamara was the 8th Secretary of Defense, serving in the cabinets of Presidents John F. Kennedy and Lyndon B. Johnson from 1961 to 1968.
- Clark Clifford was the 9th Secretary of Defense, serving in the cabinet of President Lyndon B. Johnson from 1968 to 1969.
- Melvin Laird was the 10th Secretary of Defense, serving in the cabinet of President Richard Nixon from 1969 to 1973.
- James R. Schlesinger was the 12th Secretary of Defense, serving in the cabinets of Presidents Richard Nixon and Gerald Ford from 1973 to 1975.
- Henry Kissinger was the 8th National Security Advisor and the 56th Secretary of State, serving under Presidents Richard Nixon and Gerald Ford from 1969 to 1977.

==== Military ====
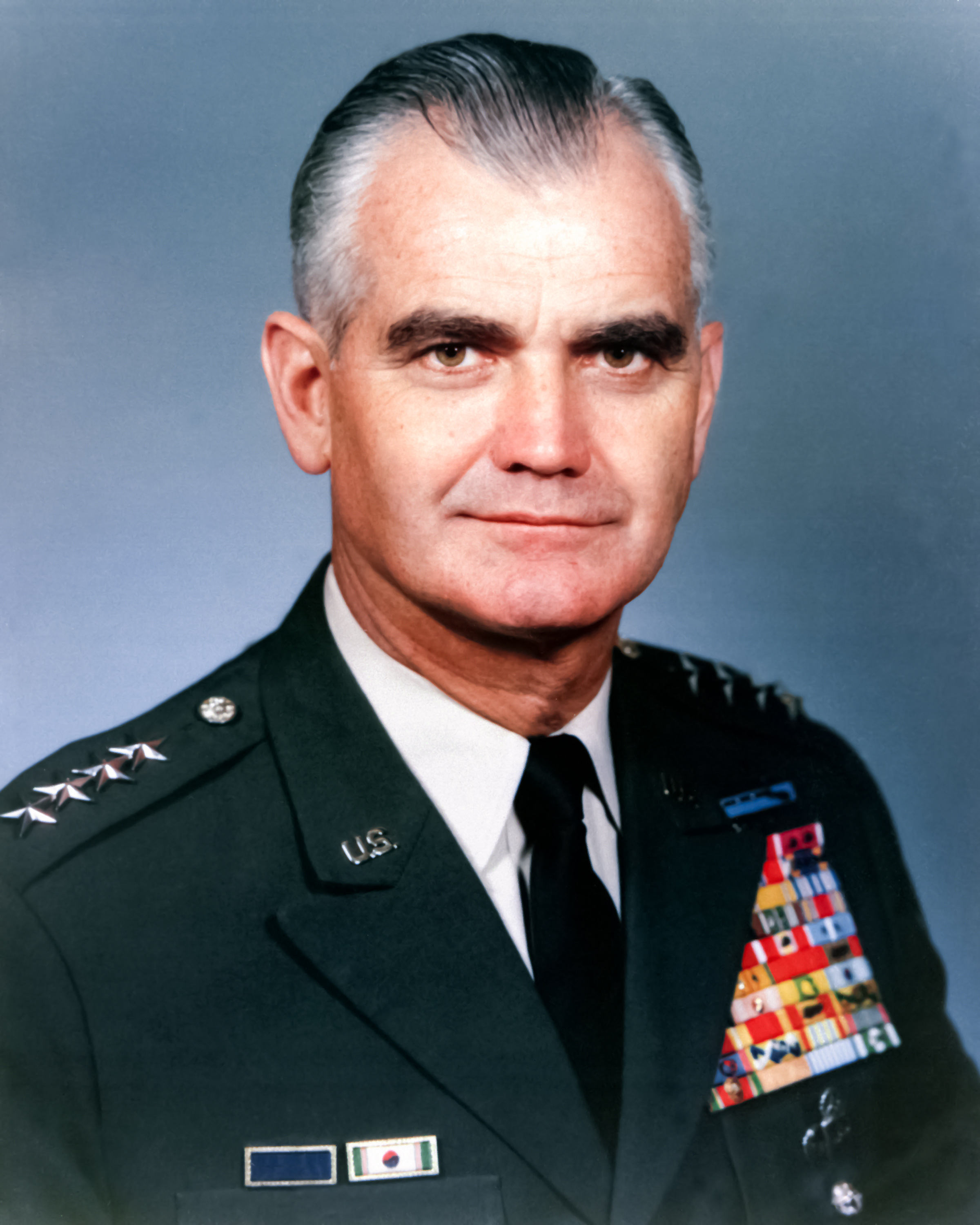
William Westmoreland

- Earle Wheeler was a United States Army General who served as Chairman of the Joint Chiefs of Staff from 1964 to 1970.
- Thomas Hinman Moorer was a United States Navy admiral who served as Chairman of the Joint Chiefs of Staff from 1970 to 1974.
- William Westmoreland was a U.S. Army General who commanded American military operations in the Vietnam War from 1964 to 1968.
- Creighton Abrams was an U.S. Army General who commanded American military operations in the Vietnam War from 1968 to 1972.
- Frederick C. Weyand was a U.S. Army General who was the last commander of American military operations in the Vietnam War from 1972 to 1973.
- Elmo Zumwalt was a U.S. admiral and commander of American naval forces in Vietnam.
- William W. Momyer was commander of the U.S. Air Force Tactical Air Command and the commander of the 7th Air Force.
- John S. McCain, Jr. was a U.S. admiral and Commander-in-Chief of the Pacific Command.
- George Stephen Morrison was a U.S. Admiral in command during the Gulf of Tonkin incident, which escalated the U.S. involvement in Vietnam.
- Joseph Harold Moore was a lieutenant general in the United States Air Force (USAF), known for his role as commander of the 2nd Air Division and Seventh Air Force.
- Robert McDade was a United States Army colonel best known for commanding the 2nd Battalion, 7th Cavalry Regiment during the Battle of la Drang in 1965.
- Hal Moore, United States Army lieutenant general and author who, as a lieutenant colonel, he commanded the 1st Battalion, 7th Cavalry Regiment, at the Battle of Ia Drang.
- Damon W. Cooper, was a United States Navy Vice admiral who served as the Commander, Task Force 77 during the late stages of the Vietnam War.

=== Republic of Korea ===
- Park Chung Hee was the President of South Korea from 1963 until his assassination in 1979.
- Chae Myung-shin was the Commander of the Republic of Korea Armed Forces in South Vietnam from 1965 to 1969.

=== Australia ===
Political

- Sir Robert Menzies was the Prime Minister of Australia from 1949 to 1966.
- Harold Holt was the Prime Minister of Australia from 1966 until his disappearance in 1967.
- John McEwen was the interim Prime Minister of Australia from 1967 to 1968 following Holt's disappearance.
- John Gorton was the Prime Minister of Australia from 1968 to 1971.
- William McMahon was the Prime Minister of Australia from 1971 to 1972.
- Gough Whitlam was the Prime Minister of Australia from 1972 to 1975.

Military

- Air Chief Marshal Sir Frederick Scherger was Chairman, Chiefs of Staff Committee from 1961 to 1966.
- Lieutenant General Sir Reginald Pollard was Chief of Army from 1960 to 1963.
- Ted Serong was a senior officer of the Australian Army and commander of the Australian Army Training Team Vietnam from 1962 to 1965.
- Donald Dunstan was an Australian Army officer, who was commander of Australian Forces in Vietnam in 1971 and 1972.

=== New Zealand ===
- Sir Keith Holyoake was the Prime Minister of New Zealand from 1960 to 1972.
- Sir Jack Marshall was the Prime Minister of New Zealand in 1972.
- Norman Kirk was the Prime Minister of New Zealand from 1972 to 1974.

=== Philippines ===
- Ramon Magsaysay was the President of the Philippines from 1953 until his death in 1957 on an airplane crash.
- Diosdado Macapagal was the President of the Philippines from 1961 to 1965.
- Ferdinand Marcos was the President of the Philippines from 1965 to 1986.
- Gaudencio V. Tobias was a Brigadier General and the commander of the Philippine Civic Action Group (PHILCAG) which was deployed to South Vietnam.
- Fidel V. Ramos was a General and was a non-combat civil military engineer and Chief of Staff of the Philippine Civil Action Group (PHILCAG).
- Delfin Castro was a Major General and the Liaison Officer for Operations and Intelligence under MACV
- Rafael Ileto was the Commanding General of the Philippine Army from 1969 to 1972

=== Thailand ===
==== Political ====
- Sarit Thanarat was the Prime Minister of Thailand from 1958 to 1963 against the communist Pathet Lao guerrillas in the neighboring Kingdom of Laos. During his years as prime minister Sarit was a patron of his cousin, the Lao strongman General Phoumi Nosavan, against the communist Pathet Lao guerrillas in the neighboring Kingdom of Laos.
- Thanom Kittikachorn was the Prime Minister of Thailand from 1963 to 1973 and Chief of the Royal Thai Armed Forces from 1967 to 1972.
- Praphas Charusathien was the Chief of the Royal Thai Army from 1964 to 1973.

==== Military ====
===== Royal Thai Force Vietnam =====
- 1967 - 1968: Major General Yot Thephatsadin Na Ayudhya was Commander of the First Rotation, Royal Thai Force Vietnam.
- 1968 - 1969: Lieutenant General Chalard Hirunsiri was Commander of the Second Rotation, Royal Thai Force Vietnam. He later played a key role in the failed March 1977 coup attempt and was executed for treason.
- 1969 - 1970: Lieutenant General Chawang Yangcharoen was Commander of the Third Rotation, Royal Thai Force Vietnam.
- 1970 - 1971: Lieutenant General Serm Na Nakorn was Commander of the Forth Rotation, Royal Thai Force Vietnam.
- 1971 - 1972: Lieutenant General Thawit Boonyawat was Commander of the Fifth Rotation, Royal Thai Force Vietnam.

====== Royal Thai Volunteer Regiment ======
- 1967-1968: Colonel Sanan Yuthasarapisit was Commander of the Queen's Cobras Regiment.

===== Royal Thai Army Volunteer Force =====
- 1968 - 1969 : Major General Thawee Damromghud was Commander of Black Panthers Division, Rotation 1.
- 1969 - 1970 : Major General Swasdi Makkaroon was Commander of Black Panthers Division, Rotation 2
- 1970 - 1972 : Major General Erm Chirapongse was Black Panthers Division, Rotation 3.

=== Cambodia / Khmer Republic ===
- Norodom Sihanouk was Chief of State of Cambodia from 1960 to 1970
- Lon Nol was the Prime Minister of Cambodia from 1966 to 1967 and then again in 1969 to 1972, after which he was president until 1975.
- Lon Non was the younger brother of Lon Nol who served in various roles including as Minister of Interior from 1970 to 1973.
- Prince Sisowath Sirik Matak was deputy prime minister of Cambodia (1969–70) and then the Khmer Republic (1970-1) and then prime minister (1971-2)
- Long Boret was the last prime minister of the Khmer Republic from December 1973 to April 1975
- Sosthene Fernandez was the commander-in-chief of the Khmer National Armed Forces (FANK).
- Sak Sutsakhan was the Minister of Defence of Cambodia, a FANK general and the last head of state of the Khmer Republic.

=== Kingdom of Laos ===
- Souvanna Phouma was the prince of Laos and a political figure.
- Vang Pao was a major general in the Royal Lao Army and commander of the Hmong guerrilla forces that had a large impact on the war.

== Communist forces ==
=== North Vietnam ===
==== Political ====
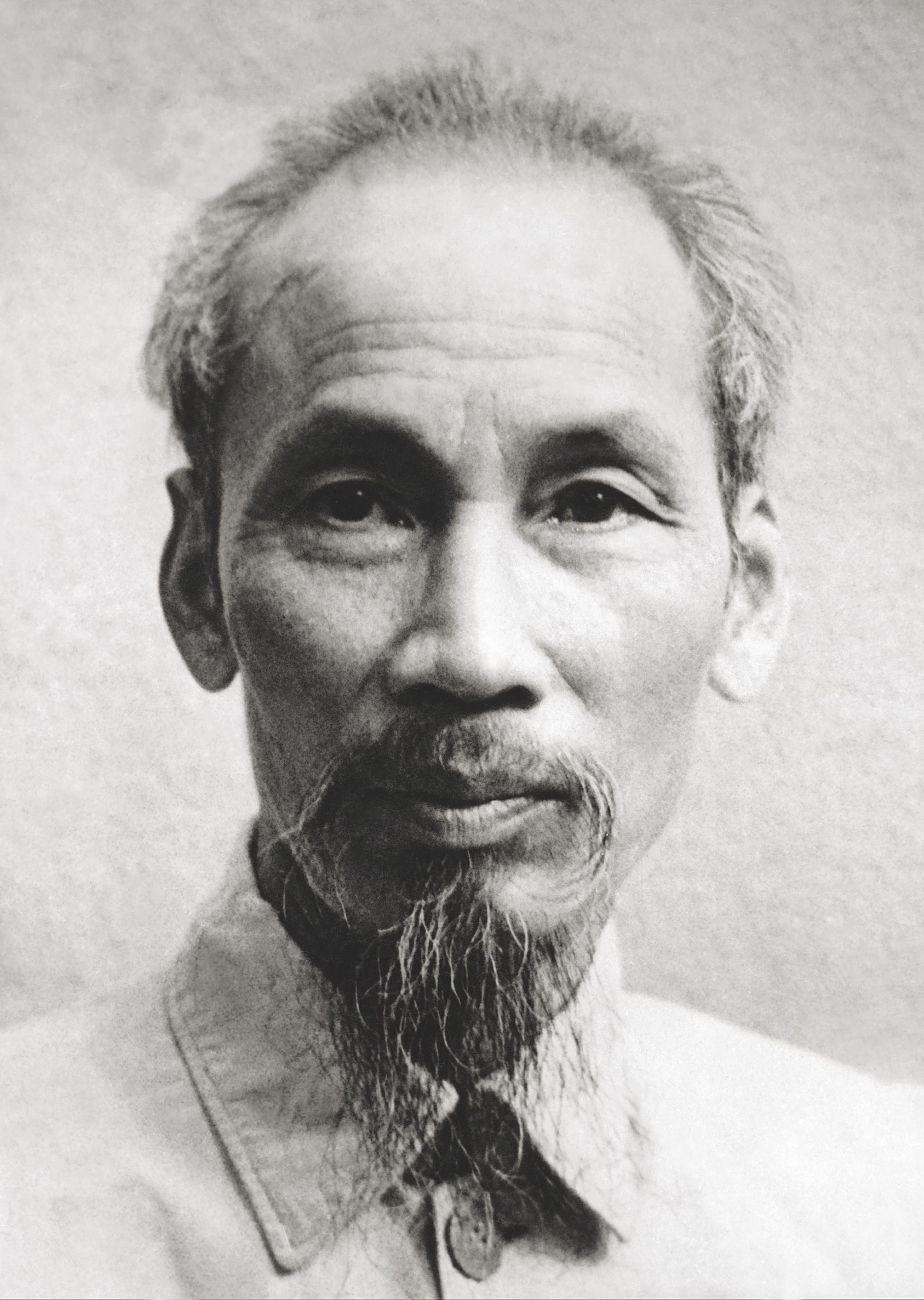
Hồ Chí Minh

- Hồ Chí Minh was prime minister from 1946 to 1955, president from 1945 and Chairman of the Workers' Party of Vietnam from 1951 until his death in 1969 of the Democratic Republic of Vietnam (North Vietnam).
- Lê Duẩn was the General Secretary of the Communist Party of Vietnam, leader of North Vietnam and later the unified Vietnam from 1969 until his death in 1986.
- Tôn Đức Thắng was the second and final President of North Vietnam and the first President of the Socialist Republic of Vietnam.
- Phạm Văn Đồng was the Prime Minister of North Vietnam from 1955 to 1976.
- Lê Đức Thọ was a Vietnamese politician who, as North Vietnam's representative, negotiated the Paris Peace Accords.
- Trường Chinh was ranked in the top 3 of the Vietnamese Politburo from 1941 to 1986 and both preceded and succeeded Lê Duẩn as General Secretary.

==== Military ====
- Võ Nguyên Giáp was a General in the People's Army of Vietnam (PAVN), Secretary of the Central Military Commission, Commander-in-Chief of PAVN and was one of the most prominent military leaders during the war.
- Văn Tiến Dũng was a PAVN general, PAVN chief of staff (1954–1974) and PAVN commander in chief (1974–1980)
- Hoàng Văn Thái was a member of the PAVN General Staff, after holding being first Chief of General Staff of the PAVN. From 1967 to 1973, he was the commander of Viet Cong.
- Nguyễn Hữu An was a PAVN general, commander of the 2nd Army Corps.
- Lê Trọng Tấn was a PAVN general and deputy commander of the Viet Cong and held senior commands in the Easter Offensive and the Ho Chi Minh campaign.
- Hoàng Minh Thảo was a PAVN general and military theorist and a commander of the Viet Cong.

=== Viet Cong (National Liberation Front) ===
- Nguyễn Hữu Thọ was the chairman of the Viet Cong
- Nguyễn Chí Thanh was a PAVN general and served as commander of the Central Office for South Vietnam from 1965 until his death in July 1967.
- Trần Văn Trà was commander of Liberation Army of South Vietnam
- Trần Độ was the deputy commander of the Viet Cong.
- Nguyễn Văn Linh was General Secreatary of the People's Revolutionary Party and Secreatary of the Central Office for South Vietnam.
- Võ Chí Công was Vice-Chairman of the Viet Cong and Chairman of the People's Revolutionary Party.
- Huỳnh Tấn Phát was Secreatary-General of the Viet Cong, Vice-Chairman of the Viet Cong and chairman of the Provisional Revolutionary Government of the Republic of South Vietnam from 1969 to 1976.
- Phạm Hùng was Secretary of the Central Office for South Vietnam.

=== Khmer Rouge ===
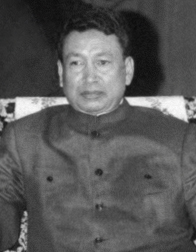
Pol Pot

- Pol Pot was the General Secretary of the Communist Party of Kampuchea and the leader of the Cambodian communist movement known as the Khmer Rouge.
- Khieu Samphan was the head of the CPNLAF, the Khmer Rouge armed forces.
- Prince Norodom Sihanouk was the prime minister and head of state of Cambodia from 1960 to 1970 and was then figurehead leader of the National United Front of Kampuchea, which included the Khmer Rouge from 1970 to 1975.

=== Pathet Lao ===
- Souphanouvong was the figurehead leader of the Lao People's Revolutionary Party, and upon its successful seizure of power in 1975, he became the first President of the Lao People's Democratic Republic.
- Phoumi Vongvichit was a leading figure of the Pathet Lao and an elder statesman of the Lao People's Democratic Republic.
- Kaysone Phomvihane was the General Secretary of the Lao People's Revolutionary Party from 1955 to his death in 1992 and Prime Minister and then President after the takeover.
- Khamtai Siphandone was the military commander of the Pathet Lao and Defense Minister after the takeover before succeeding Kaysone Phomvihane.

=== People's Republic of China ===
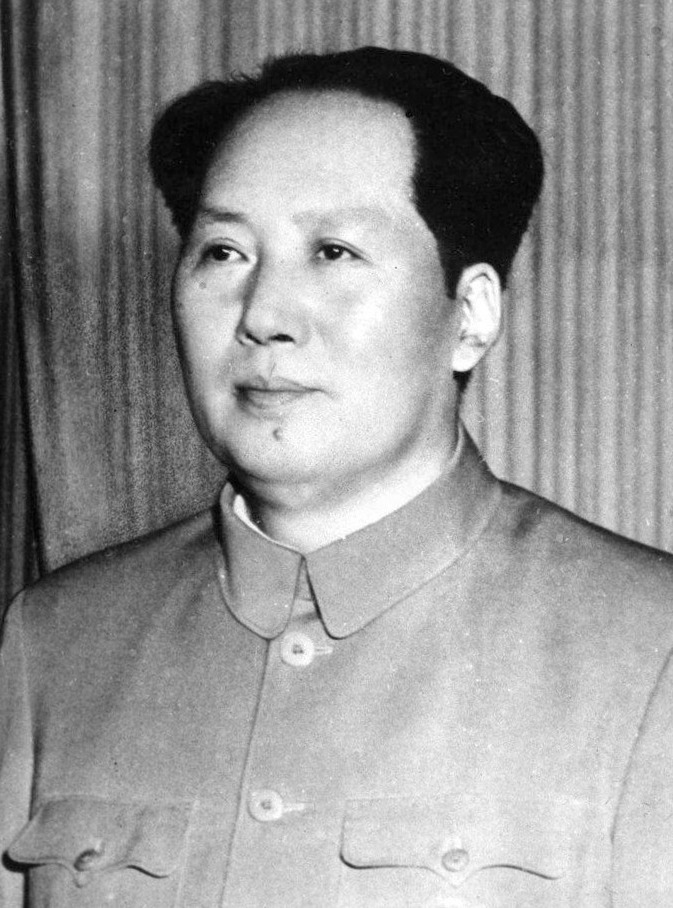
Mao Zedong

- Mao Zedong was the Chairman of the Chinese Communist Party from 1945 and the paramount leader of the People's Republic of China from 1949 until his death in 1976.
- Zhou Enlai was the Premier of People's Republic of China from 1949-1976.
- Liu Shaoqi was the 2nd Chairman of People's Republic of China.

=== Soviet Union ===
- Nikita Khrushchev was the First Secretary of the Communist Party and the leader of the Soviet Union from 1953 to 1964.
- Leonid Brezhnev was the General Secretary of the Communist Party and the leader of the Soviet Union from 1964 until his death in 1982.
- Rodion Malinovsky was the Marshal of the Soviet Union and Minister of Defense of the Soviet Union in 1957–1967.
- Andrei Grechko was the Marshal of the Soviet Union Minister of Defense of the Soviet Union in 1967–1976.

=== North Korea ===
- Kim Il Sung was the General Secretary of the Workers' Party of Korea and the supreme leader of North Korea from 1948 until his death in 1994.
