= List of bombs in the Vietnam War =

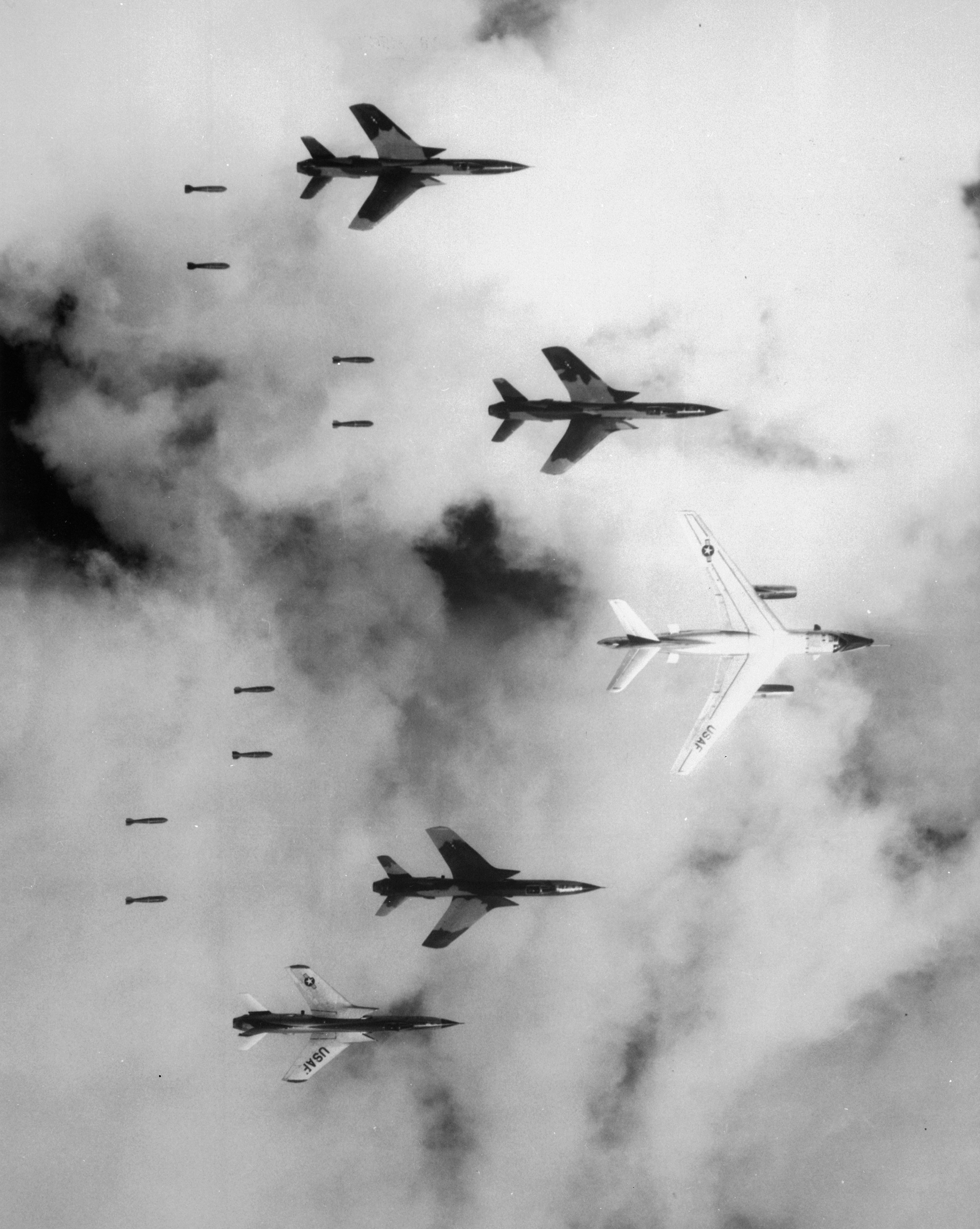
American aircraft conducted extensive bombing campaigns during the conflict, such as here during Operation Rolling Thunder

The American air campaign during the Vietnam War was the largest in military history. The US contribution to this air-war was the largest. Chief of Staff of the United States Air Force Curtis LeMay stated that "we're going to bomb them back into the Stone Age".

== Background ==
On March 2, 1965, following the Attack on Camp Holloway at Pleiku, Operation Flaming Dart and Operation Rolling Thunder commenced. The bombing campaign, which ultimately lasted three years, was intended to force North Vietnam to cease its support for the Vietcong (VC) by threatening to destroy North Vietnam's air defenses and industrial infrastructure. As well, it was aimed at bolstering the morale of the South Vietnamese. Between March 1965 and November 1968, "Rolling Thunder" deluged the north with a million tons of missiles, rockets and bombs. Bombing was not restricted to North Vietnam. Other aerial campaigns, such as Operation Commando Hunt, targeted different parts of the VC and People's Army of Vietnam infrastructure. These included the Ho Chi Minh Trail, which ran through Laos and Cambodia. The objective of forcing North Vietnam to stop its support for the insurgency in South Vietnam, however, was never reached.

By the time the United States ended its Southeast Asian bombing campaigns, the total tonnage of ordnance dropped approximately tripled the totals for World War II. The Indochinese bombings amounted to 7,662,000 tons of explosives, compared to 2,150,000 tons in the world conflict.

== USAF/USN/RVNAF/RLAF aircraft used ==
The United States Air Force, United States Navy and their South Vietnamese allies, the Republic of Vietnam Air Force, fielded a large array of technologically advanced ground attack and bomber aircraft. These included the Douglas A-1 Skyraider carrier borne propeller driven dive bomber, the Cessna A-37 Dragonfly, the F-100 Super Sabre, the Northrop F-5 Freedom Fighter, Douglas A-4 Skyhawk carrier borne light attack plane, Grumman A-6 Intruder carrier borne all weather medium bomber and Ling-Temco-Vought A-7 Corsair II carrier borne ground attack plane, the F-105 Thunderchief, the F-4 Phantom II, the General Dynamics F-111 Aardvark Fighter/Bomber, the Boeing B-52 Stratofortress heavy bomber, Martin B-57 Canberra medium bombers and the English Electric/GAF Canberra B.20 medium bomber.

The North American T-28 Trojan was extensively used by the Vietnamese Air Force and the Royal Lao Air Force for close air support and other bombing missions. Upon occasion, the Lockheed C-130 Hercules was used to drop M-121 bombs that were too large to be carried by smaller aircraft. The North American Rockwell OV-10 Bronco reconnaissance craft could also be used for bombing.

This vast variety of ground attack aircraft used a large number of bombs.

== List of bombs ==
=== Conventional bombs ===
- Mk-81
- CBU-55
- Mk-77
- Mk-82
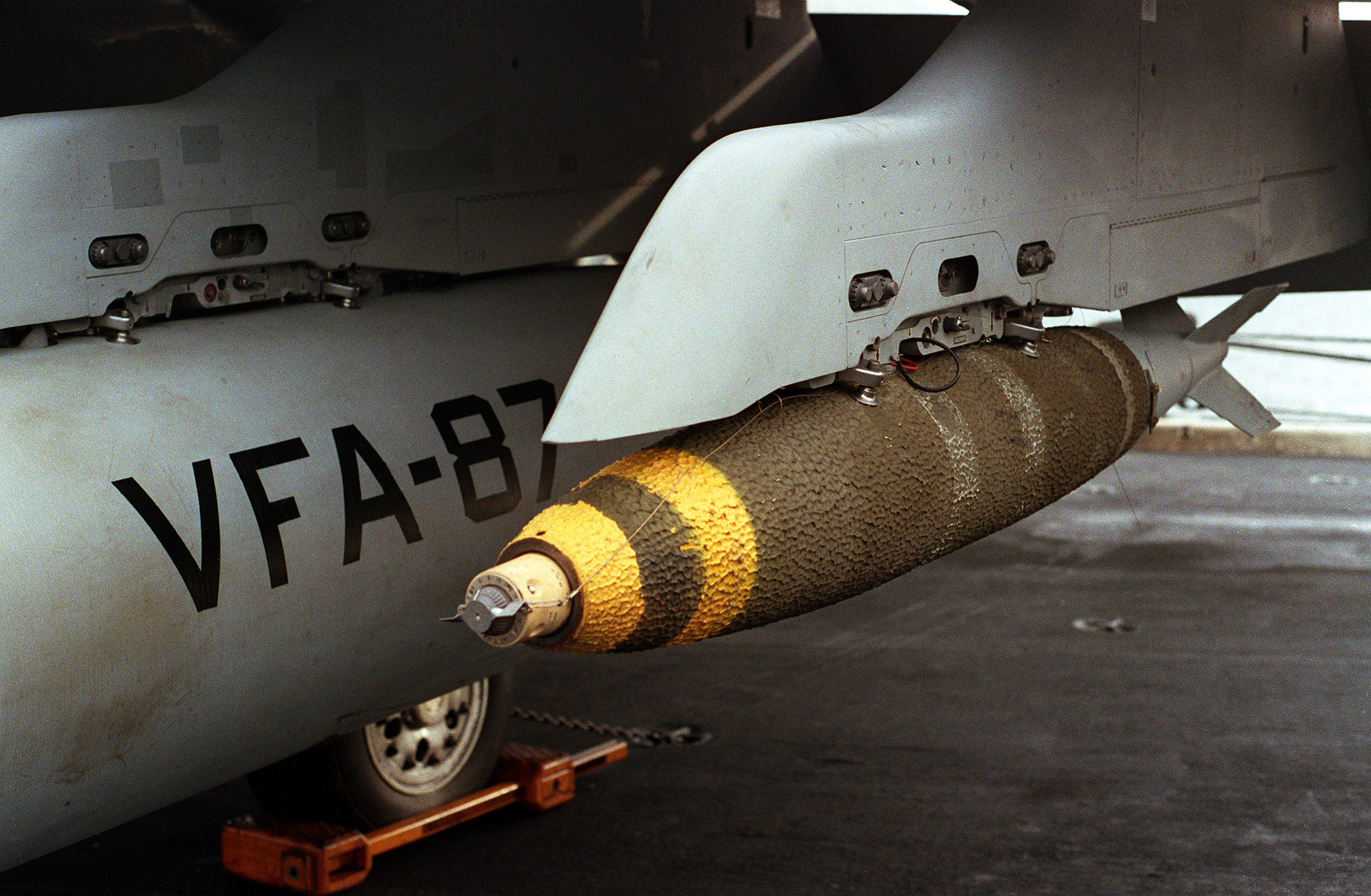
  The Mk-82
- Mk-82 HDGP
- Mk-82 500 LB Bomb
- Mk-83
- Mk-84
  The Mk-84
- Mk-15
- Mk-20 Rockeye (CBU-100 Cluster Bomb)
- Mk-22
- Mk-38
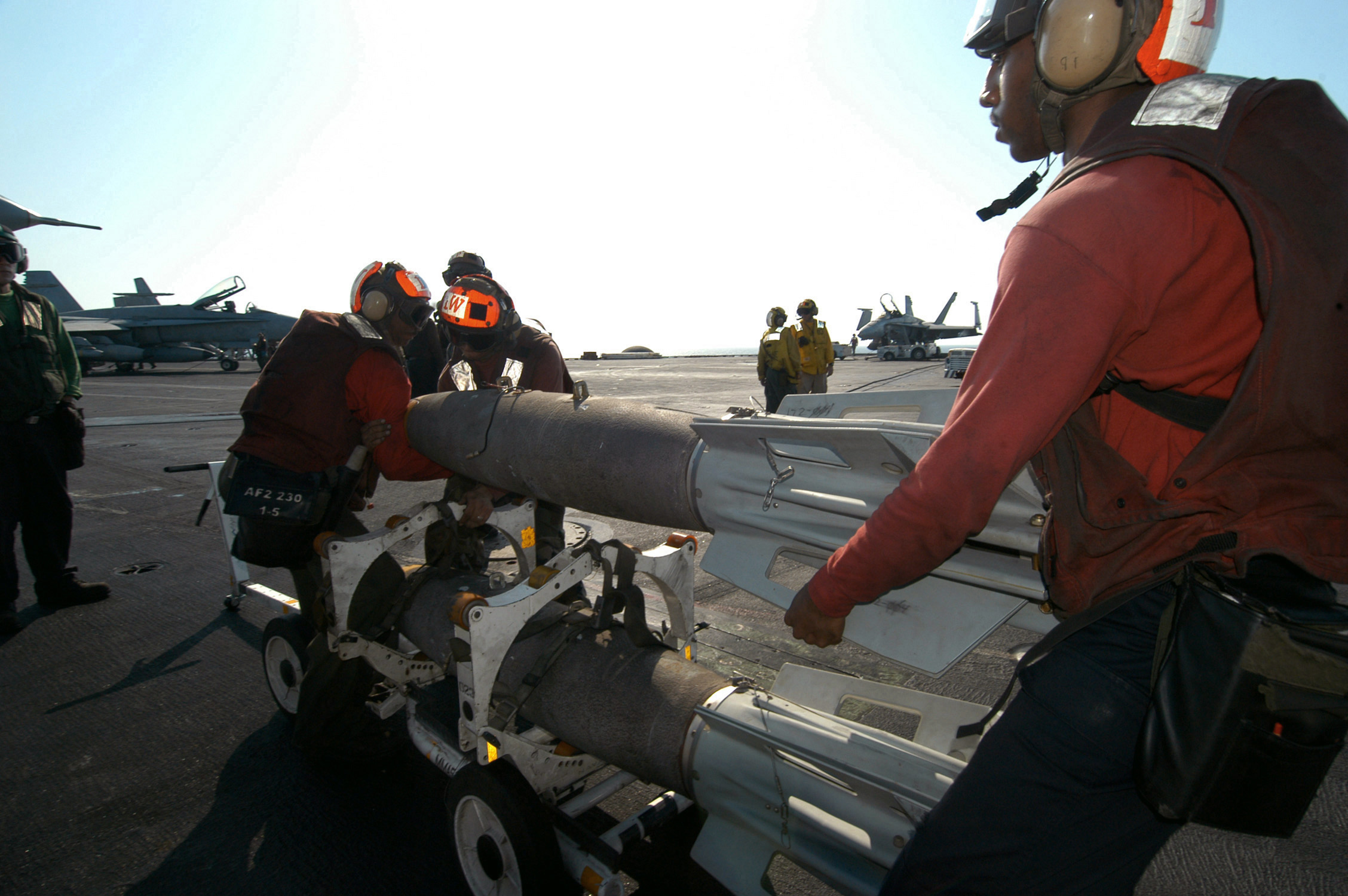
  The MK83 bomb
- Mk-65
- Mk-117
- Mk-118
- BLU-82 Daisy cutter
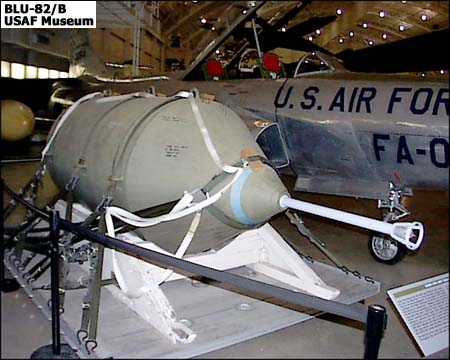
  A Daisy Cutter
- M-121
- Toilet

=== Guided bombs ===
- AGM-62 Walleye
- BLU-3 Pineapple
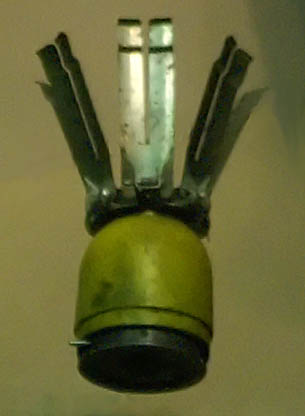
  A BLU-3 Pineapple Cluster Bomblett
- BLU-18
- BLU-17/B
- BLU-26/B
- BLU-24/B
- BLU-36/B
- BLU-66/B
- BLU-59/B
- BLU-61A/B
- BLU-63/B
- BLU-77/B
- BLU-24/B
- BLU-85/B
- BLU-86/B
- BOLT-117
- GBU-10
- GBU-11
- GBU-12 Paveway II
- GBU-27 Paveway III
- GBU-37 Sanslot

=== Fuel Air Explosives ===
- BLU-72 Pave Pat I
- BLU-76 Pave Pat II
- BLU-118
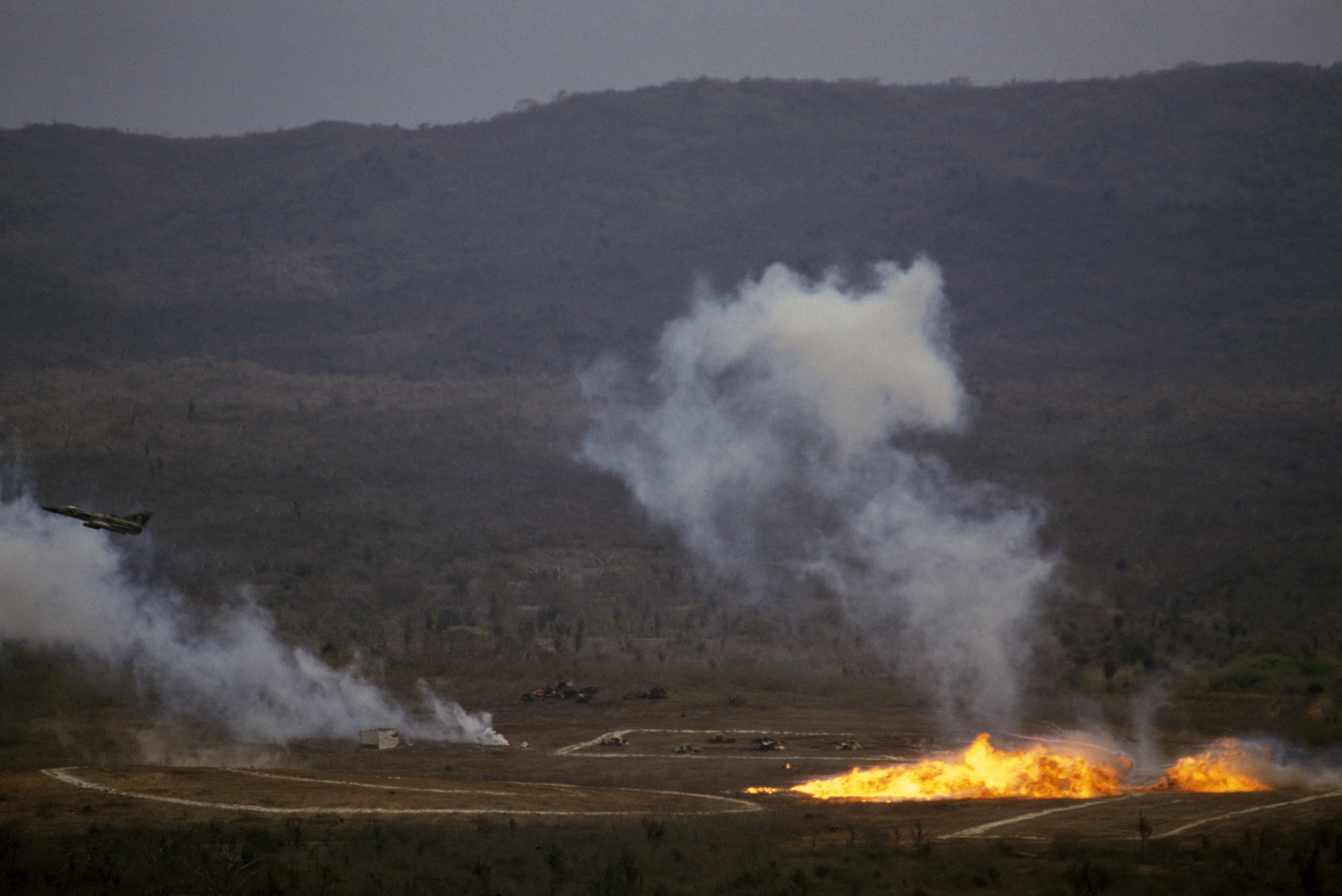
  Napalm was dropped using BLU-118s

== See also ==
- Weapons of the Vietnam War
- Aircraft losses of the Vietnam War
