= United States in the Vietnam War =

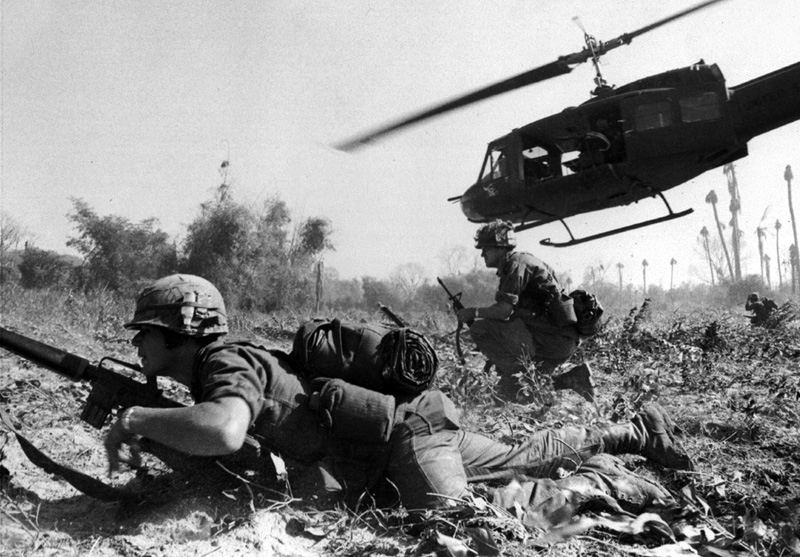
U.S. soldiers disembark from a UH-1D helicopter at the Battle of Ia Drang in South Vietnam, November 1965

The involvement of the United States in the Vietnam War began in the 1950s and greatly escalated in 1965 until its withdrawal in 1973. The U.S. military presence in Vietnam peaked in April 1969, with 543,000 military personnel stationed in the country. By the end of the U.S. involvement, more than 3.1 million Americans had been stationed in Vietnam, and 58,279 had been killed.

After World War II ended in 1945, President Harry S. Truman declared his doctrine of "containment" of communism in 1947 at the start of the Cold War. U.S. involvement in Vietnam began in 1950, with Truman sending military advisors to assist the French Union against Viet Minh rebels in the First Indochina War. The French withdrew in 1954, leaving North Vietnam in control of the country's northern half. President Dwight D. Eisenhower ordered covert CIA activities in South Vietnam. In late 1955, the Ngo Dinh Diem regime strengthened the campaign against clandestine communists who had remained behind in South Vietnam, an initiative that the US was largely uninterested in, but from 1957 insurgents known as the Viet Cong launched a campaign against the state. North Vietnam supported the Viet Cong, which began fighting the South Vietnamese army. President John F. Kennedy, who subscribed to the "domino theory" that communism would spread to other countries if Vietnam fell, expanded U.S. aid to South Vietnam, increasing the number of advisors from 900 to 16,300, but this failed to produce results. In 1963, Diem was deposed and killed in a military coup tacitly approved by the U.S. North Vietnam began sending detachments of its own army, armed with Soviet and Chinese weapons, to assist the Viet Cong.

After the Gulf of Tonkin incident in 1964, President Lyndon B. Johnson ordered air strikes against North Vietnam, and Congress passed the Gulf of Tonkin Resolution, which authorized military intervention in defense of South Vietnam. From early 1965, U.S. involvement in Vietnam escalated rapidly, launching Operation Rolling Thunder against targets in the North and ordering 3,500 Marines to the region. It became clear that aerial strikes alone would not win the war, so ground troops were regularly augmented. General William Westmoreland, who commanded the U.S. forces, opted for a war of attrition. Opposition to the war in the U.S. was massive, and was strengthened as news reported on the use of napalm, a mounting death toll among soldiers and civilians, the effects of the chemical defoliant Agent Orange, and U.S. war crimes such as the My Lai massacre. In 1968, North Vietnam and the Viet Cong launched the Tet Offensive, after which Westmoreland estimated that 200,000 more U.S. troops were needed for victory. Johnson rejected his request, announced he would not seek another term in office, and ordered an end to Rolling Thunder. Johnson's successor, President Richard Nixon, adopted a policy of "Vietnamization", training the South Vietnamese army so it could defend the country while also starting a phased withdrawal of American troops. By 1972, there were only 69,000 U.S. troops in Vietnam, and in 1973 the Paris Peace Accords were signed, removing the last of the troops. In 1975, the South's capital of Saigon fell after a successful invasion from the North, and Vietnam was reunited in 1976.

The costs of fighting the war for the U.S. were considerable. In addition to the 58,279 soldiers killed, the expenditure of about US$168 billion limited Johnson's Great Society program of domestic reforms and created a large federal budget deficit. Some historians blame the lack of military success on poor tactics, while others argue that the U.S. was not equipped to fight a determined guerilla enemy. The failure to win the war dispelled myths of U.S. military invincibility and divided the nation between those who supported and opposed the war. As of 2019, it was estimated that approximately 610,000 Vietnam veterans are still alive, making them the second-largest group of military veterans behind those of the war on terror. The war has been portrayed in the thousands of movies, books, and video games centered on the conflict.

== Timeline ==
=== Early 20th century (1919–1949) ===
- 1919 — The Council of Four ignored the Revendications petition submitted by the Group of Annamese Patriots, written mostly by Phan Văn Trường and signed by Nguyễn Ái Quốc on their behalf. The petition did not demand independence, but instead called on France to honor its reformist promises.
- 1941 — Franklin D. Roosevelt declines repeated requests from the French to assist France's attempts to recolonize Vietnam.
- July 1945 — Members of the Office of Strategic Services (OSS), commanded by Major Allison Thomas, parachute into Vietnam to help train Viet Minh forces for operations against occupying Japanese forces.
- August 15, 1945 — Japan surrenders to the Allies of World War II. In Indochina, the Japanese military administration decides not to intervene in Vietnamese domestic affairs, creating an opportunity for the Viet Minh to take the lead in the August Revolution.
- Late August 1945 — Nationalist Chinese forces enter Indochina and, as previously planned by the Allies, establish an administration in Vietnam as far south as the 16th parallel north. Vietnamese nationalist parties take control of several towns, competing with the Viet Minh.
- September 2, 1945 — Ho Chi Minh reads the Declaration of independence of the Democratic Republic of Vietnam (DRV) in the presence of the OSS team in Hanoi.
- Late September 1945 — British troops land in southern Vietnam and establish a provisional administration. The British free French soldiers and officials imprisoned by the Japanese. The French begin taking control of cities within the British zone of occupation.
- September 26, 1945 — OSS officer Lieutenant Colonel A. Peter Dewey, who was working with the Viet Minh to repatriate Americans captured by the Japanese, was killed by a member of the Viet Minh who mistakenly believed him to be French.
- February 1946 — The French sign an agreement with China. France gives up its concessions in Shanghai and other Chinese ports. In exchange, China agrees to assist the French in returning to Vietnam north of the 16th parallel.
- March 1946 — The US opens a consulate in Saigon, led by Charles S. Reed II. It is later made a consulate general on May 20, 1946.
- March 6, 1946 — After negotiations with the Chinese and the Viet Minh, the French sign an agreement recognizing Vietnam within the French Union. Shortly after, the French land at Haiphong and occupy the rest of northern Vietnam.
- June to August 1946 — Following the withdrawal of the Chinese Nationalists, the Viet Minh use the negotiating process with France to buy time while using their armed forces to destroy all competing nationalist groups in the north, sometimes with the help of the French. The US vice consul in Hanoi, James L. O’Sullivan, reports to Washington: "the Viet Minh League seems steadily to be eliminating all organized opposition".
- 19 December 1946 — Negotiations between the Viet Minh and the French break down. The Viet Minh launches an attack on French forces in Hanoi, starting the First Indochina War. The French drive the Viet Minh out of the city by February 1947.
- June 14, 1947: Saigon consul Reed's report to Washington expresses favor for a Federated Republic of Vietnam, balancing native rights and French interests, while signaling skepticism toward Ho Chi Minh's communist government.
- 1947–1949 — The Viet Minh fight a limited insurgency in remote rural areas of northern Vietnam.
- 1949 — Chinese communists reach the northern border of Indochina, changing the course of the Indochina War.

=== 1950s ===
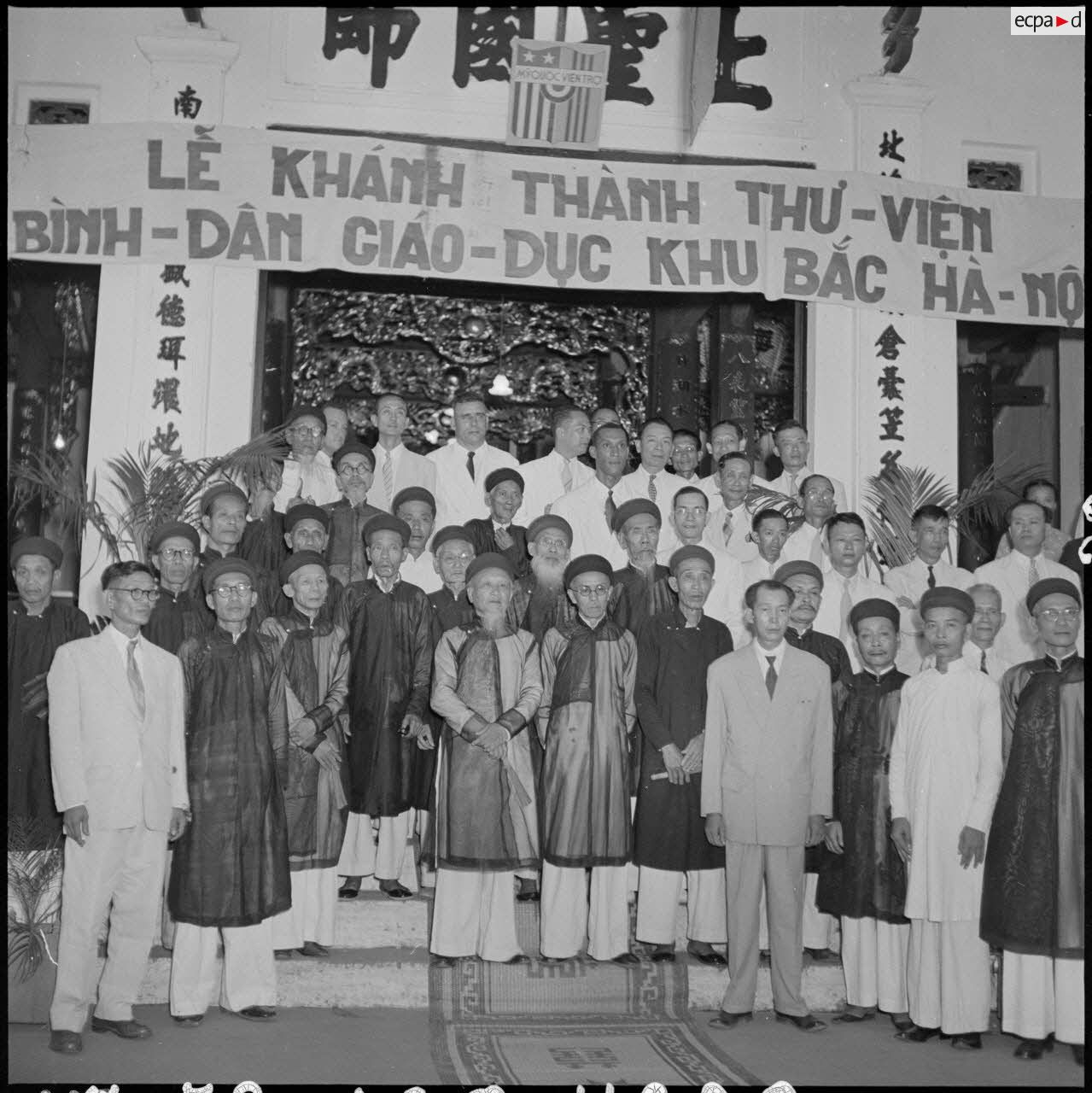
Inauguration of a library with US aid, Hanoi, 1952

- February 7, 1950 — The US recognizes the anticommunist State of Vietnam, following China's and the USSR's recognition of the communist DRV.
- May 1, 1950 — After the capture of Hainan Island from Chinese Nationalist forces by the Chinese People's Liberation Army, President Truman approves $10 million in military assistance for anti-communist efforts in Indochina. The Defense Attaché Office was established in Saigon in May 1950, a formal recognition of Vietnam (vice French Indochina). This was the beginning of formal U.S. military personnel assignments in Vietnam. U.S. Naval, Army, and Air Force personnel established their respective attachés at this time.
- September 1950 — Truman sends the Military Assistance Advisory Group (MAAG) Indochina to Vietnam to assist the French. Truman claimed they were not sent as combat troops, but to supervise the use of $10 million worth of U.S. military equipment to support the French in their effort to fight the Viet Minh forces.
- Following the outbreak of the Korean War, Truman announces "acceleration in the furnishing of military assistance to the forces of France and the Associated States in Indochina...", and sends 123 non-combat troops to help with supplies to fight against the communist Viet Minh.
- October 1950 — The Viet Minh drive the French from the Northern border region and begin to receive large amounts of weapons from China. The weapons transform the Viet Minh from an irregular large-scale insurgent movement into a conventional army.
- 1951 — Truman authorizes $150 million in French support.
- 1953 — By November, French commander in Indochina, General Navarre, asked U.S. General MacArthur to loan 12 Fairchild C-119 Flying Boxcar aircraft, to be flown by French crews, to facilitate Operation Castor at Dien Bien Phu.
- 1954 — In January, Navarre's deputy asked for additional transport aircraft. Negotiations ended on March 3, with 24 CIA pilots (CAT) to operate 12 U.S. Air Force C-119s, flying undercover using French insignia, but maintained by the USAF.
- 1954 — General Paul Ely, the French Chief of Staff, proposed an American operation to rescue French forces at Dien Bien Phu. Operation Vulture was hastily planned but not approved due to lack of consensus.
- May 6, 1954 — James B. McGovern Jr. and Wallace Buford, U.S. civilian contract pilots employed by Civil Air Transport and flying a C-119 inscribed with French Air Force insignia, were killed when their aircraft was hit by ground fire and crashed after making a parachute drop to resupply French troops at Dien Bien Phu.
- May 1954 — The Viet Minh defeat the French at Dien Bien Phu. The defeat, along with the end of the Korean War the previous year, causes the French to seek a negotiated settlement to the war.
- July 1954 — The Geneva Conference, called to determine the post-French future of Indochina, proposes a temporary division of Vietnam, to be followed by nationwide elections to unify the country in 1956. However the final declaration was left unsigned by all delegates after the United States and the State of Vietnam stated they wouldn't accept the proposal of partition.
- 1954 — Two months after the Geneva conference, North Vietnam forms Group 100 with headquarters at Ban Namèo. Its purpose is to direct, organize, train, and supply the Pathet Lao to gain control of Laos, which along with Cambodia and Vietnam formed French Indochina.
- 1954 — North Vietnam launches an "anti-landlord" campaign, during which counter-revolutionaries are imprisoned or killed. The numbers killed or imprisoned are disputed, with historian Stanley Karnow estimating about 6,000 while others (see the book Fire in the Lake) estimate only 800. Rudolph Rummel puts the figure as high as 200,000.
- 1954–1955 — Nearly one million Vietnamese civilians flee the communist administration in North Vietnam and relocate to South Vietnam, many through the US-backed Operation Passage to Freedom. About 100,000 Viet Minh personnel move in the opposite direction.
- November 1, 1955 — President Eisenhower deploys MAAG to train the Army of the Republic of Vietnam. This marks the beginning of American involvement in the war as recognized by the Vietnam Veterans Memorial.
- April 1956 — The last French troops finally withdraw from Vietnam.
- 1956 — National unification elections do not occur.
- December 1958 — North Vietnam invades Laos and occupies parts of the country.
- July 8, 1959 — Chester M. Ovnand and Dale R. Buis become the first two American advisers to die in Vietnam.
- September 1959 — North Vietnam forms Group 959, which assumes command of the Pathet Lao forces in Laos.

=== 1960s ===
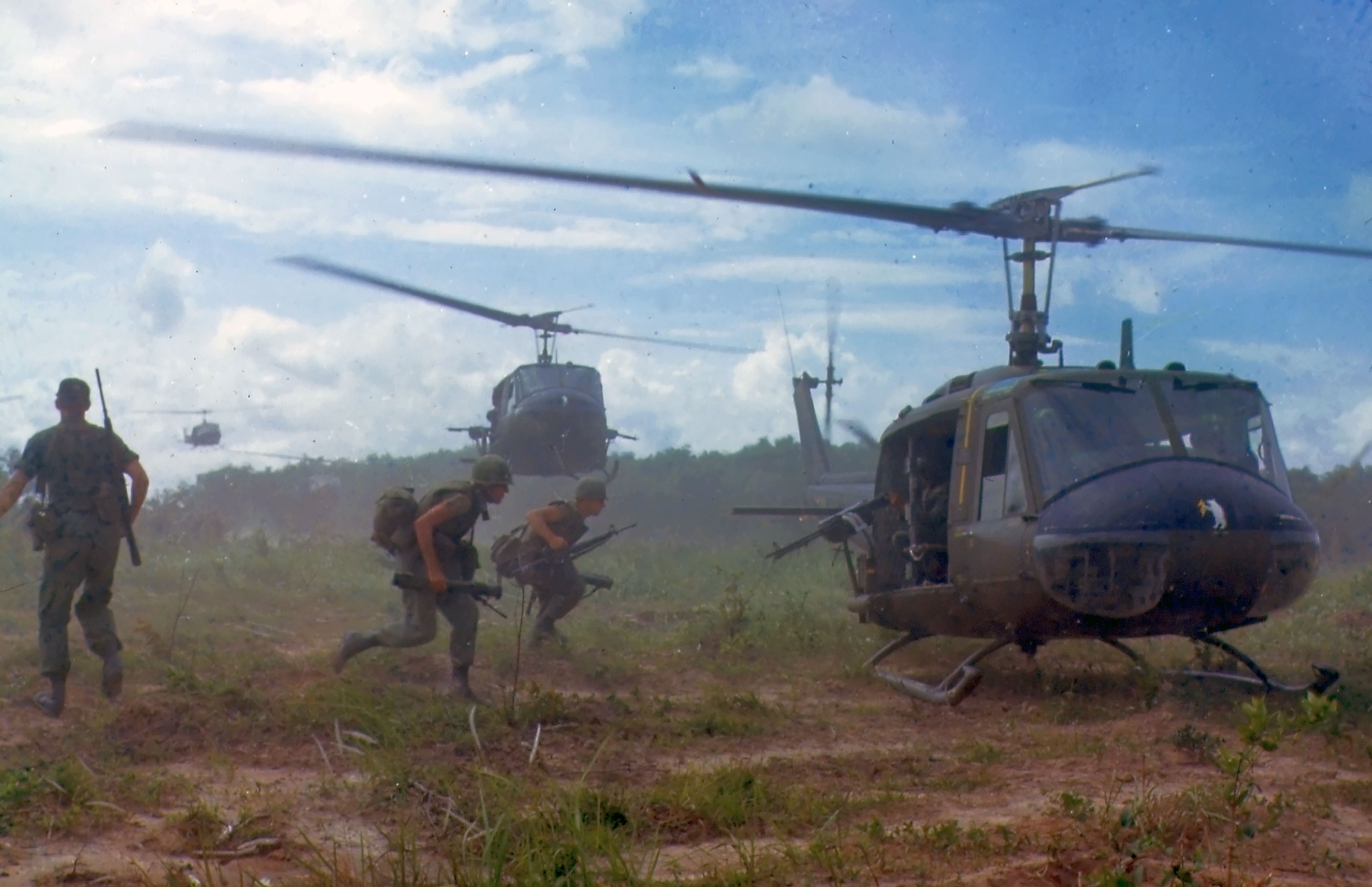
U.S. Army UH-1D helicopters airlift members of a U.S. infantry regiment, 1966

- November 1960 — Coup attempt by paratroopers is foiled after Diệm falsely promises reform, allowing loyalists to crush the rebels.
- December 20, 1960 — The National Liberation Front of South Vietnam, better known as the Viet Cong (VC), is founded.
- January 1961 — Soviet Premier Nikita Khrushchev pledges support for "wars of national liberation" throughout the world. The idea of creating a neutral Laos is suggested to Kennedy.
- May 1961 — Kennedy sends 400 United States Army Special Forces personnel to South Vietnam to train South Vietnamese soldiers following a visit to the country by Vice President Johnson.
- June 1961 — Kennedy meets with Khrushchev in Vienna. He protests North Vietnam's attacks on Laos and points out that the U.S. was supporting the neutrality of Laos. The two leaders agree to pursue a policy of creating a neutral Laos.
- June 1961 — Kennedy said, "Now we have a problem making our power credible and Vietnam looks like the place" to James Reston of The New York Times (immediately after meeting Khrushchev in Vienna).
- August 10, 1961 — Test run of U.S. herbicidal warfare program in South Vietnam, Operation Trail Dust.
- October 1961 — Following successful VC attacks, Defense Secretary Robert S. McNamara recommends sending six divisions (200,000 men) to South Vietnam.
- February 8, 1962 — Military Assistance Command Vietnam (MACV) succeeds MAAG.
- February 1962 — Attempted assassination of Diệm by two dissident Republic of Vietnam Air Force pilots who bombed his palace, fails.
- July 23, 1962 — International Agreement on the Neutrality of Laos is signed at Geneva, promising Laotian neutrality.
- August 1, 1962 — Kennedy signs the Foreign Assistance Act of 1962, which provides "... military assistance to countries which are on the rim of the Communist world and under direct attack."
- October 1962 — Operation Ranch Hand begins. U.S. planes spray herbicides and defoliants over South Vietnam until 1971.
- January 3, 1963 — VC victory in the Battle of Ap Bac.
- May 8, 1963 — Buddhists demonstrate in Huế, South Vietnam after the display of religious flags were prohibited, during the celebration of Vesak, Gautama Buddha's birthday; but, Catholic flags celebrating the consecration of Archbishop Ngô Đình Thục, brother of Diệm were not prohibited. The police of Ngô Đình Cẩn, Diệm's younger brother, open fire, killing nine.
- May 1963 — Republican Barry Goldwater declares that the U.S. should fight to win or withdraw from Vietnam. Later on, during his presidential campaign against Lyndon B. Johnson, his Democratic opponents accuse him of wanting to use nuclear weapons in the conflict.
- June 11, 1963 — Photographs of protesting Buddhist monk, Thích Quảng Đức, burning himself to death in protest in Saigon, appear in U.S. newspapers.
- Summer 1963 — Madame Nhu, de facto First Lady to the bachelor Diệm, makes a series of vitriolic attacks on Buddhists, calling the immolations "barbecues". Diệm ignores U.S. calls to silence her.
- August 21, 1963 — ARVN special forces loyal to Ngô Đình Nhu, younger brother of Diệm, stage raids across the country, attacking Buddhist temples and firing on monks. The cremated remains of Thích Quảng Đức are confiscated from Xá Lợi Pagoda in Saigon. New U.S. ambassador Henry Cabot Lodge rebukes Diệm by visiting Xá Lợi and giving refuge to Buddhist leader Thích Trí Quang. The U.S. calls for Nhu to be dropped by Diệm, and threatens to cut aid to Colonel Lê Quang Tung's Special Forces if they are not sent into battle, rather than used to repress dissidents.
- September 2, 1963 — Kennedy criticises the Diệm regime in an interview with Walter Cronkite, citing the Buddhist repression, and claiming that Diệm is out of touch.
- Late October 1963 — Nhu, unaware that Saigon region commander General Tôn Thất Đính is double-crossing him, draws up plans for a phony coup and counter-coup to reaffirm the Diệm regime. Đính sends Nhu's loyal special forces out of Saigon on the pretext of fighting communists and in readiness for the counter coup, and rings Saigon with rebel troops.
- November 1, 1963 — Military officers launch a coup d'état against Diệm, with the tacit approval of the Kennedy administration. Diệm and Nhu escape the presidential residence via a secret exit after loyalist forces were locked out of Saigon, unable to rescue them.
- November 2, 1963 — Diệm and Nhu are discovered in nearby Chợ Lớn. Although they had been promised exile by the junta, they are executed by Nguyễn Văn Nhung, bodyguard of General Dương Văn Minh. Minh leads the military junta.
- November 1963 — By this time, Kennedy has increased the number of military personnel from the 900 that were there when he became president to 16,000 just before his death.
- November 22, 1963 — Kennedy is assassinated, and Johnson is sworn in as president.
- August 1964 — Gulf of Tonkin incident: USS Maddox is allegedly attacked by North Vietnamese patrol torpedo boats in the Gulf of Tonkin (the attack is later disputed), leading Johnson to call for air strikes on North Vietnamese patrol boat bases. Two U.S. aircraft are shot down and one U.S. pilot, Everett Alvarez, Jr., becomes the first U.S. airman to be taken prisoner by North Vietnam. Congress passes the Gulf of Tonkin Resolution, authorizing U.S. military action to support any Southeast Asia Treaty Organization government against communist aggression.
- March 2, 1965 — Operation Rolling Thunder begins.
- March 8, 1965 — First U.S. ground troops arrive in Da Nang composed of 3,500 US Marines of the 3rd Marine Division on Okinawa.
- March 10, 1965 — Authored in secret with roots from at least 1964, "Plan of Action for South Vietnam" is a Top Secret rolling document and evolving plan that outlines a significant departure from the public narrative: eradicating communism in Indochina, to "avoiding a humiliating US defeat". The report is dated both 10 and 24 March 1965—months and ultimately years before the bulk of US ground troops are to be deployed.
- July 28, 1965 — In a nationally televised speech, Johnson announces his decision to send an additional 50,000 American troops to South Vietnam, increasing the number of personnel there by two-thirds and to bring the commitment to 125,000. Johnson also says that the monthly draft call would more than double, to more than 1,000 new young men per day (from 17,000 to 35,000) for enlistment and training in the U.S. Armed Forces.
- 1966 — Johnson expands the number of troops being sent into Vietnam to 385,000.
- October 1966 — McNamara initiates Project 100,000 significantly reducing recruitment standards for the U.S. military in the face of rising manpower needs.
- April 20, 1969 — Nixon orders the withdrawal of 150,000 U.S. troops from South Vietnam over the span of 12 months, citing Vietnamization; U.S. troop presence peaks at over 540,000.
- June 8, 1969 — Nixon announces that 25,000 U.S. troops would be withdrawn by the end of September. A month later, troops would begin departing South Vietnam.
- July 25, 1969 — The Nixon Doctrine is announced in an informal press conference.
- July 30, 1969 — Nixon visits South Vietnam for the first and only time as president.
- October 15, 1969 — Across the U.S., hundreds of thousands attend mass protests for withdrawal from the Vietnam War.
- November 15, 1969 — A second, larger protest takes place in Washington, D.C., with an estimated 500,000 people.
- December 1, 1969 — The first draft lottery since 1942 is held.

=== 1970s ===
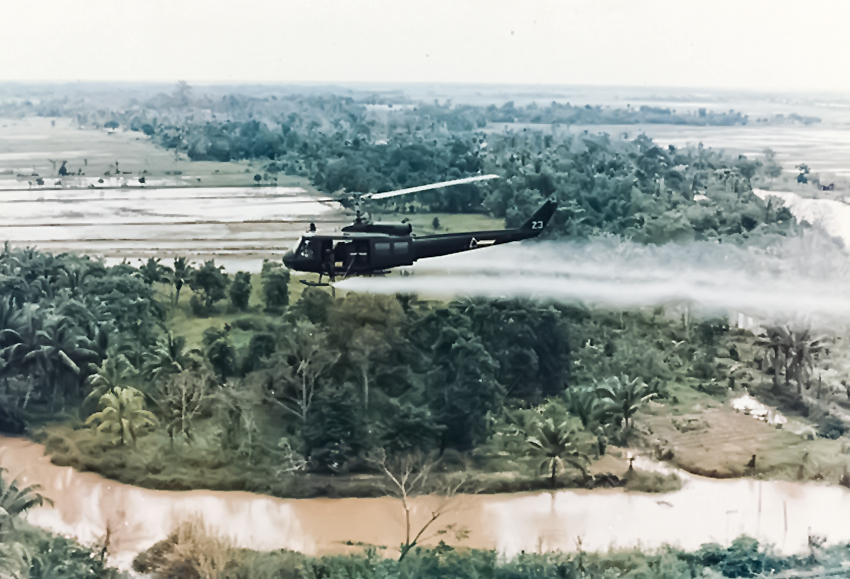
U.S. Army Huey helicopter spraying Agent Orange over agricultural land in Vietnam during its herbicidal warfare campaign

- April 20, 1970 — Nixon announces a second withdrawal of 150,000 U.S. troops from South Vietnam over the span of 12 months.
- April 30, 1970 — Nixon announces that U.S. troops were sent into Cambodia, reversing his April 20 decision to withdraw 150,000 troops.
- June 3, 1970 — Nixon withdraws half of the 31,000 troops in Cambodia to fight in South Vietnam.
- January 6, 1971 — Secretary of Defense Melvin Laird says that the combat mission of U.S. troops were planned to end by summer.
- March 1, 1971 — At 1:32 a.m., a bomb planted by the Weather Underground explodes outside the U.S. Capitol in protest of the invasion of Laos.
- April 23, 1971 — A protest tantamount to the November 1969 protest takes place in Washington, D.C.
- June 13, 1971 — The Pentagon Papers begin to be published.
- July 26, 1971 — Kissinger announces plans for $7.5 billion in aid to be provided for Vietnam, and for the removal of all U.S. troops within nine months.
- January 13, 1972 — Nixon announces plans for 70,000 U.S. troops to be pulled out of Vietnam, half of the remaining forces.
- February 21, 1972 — Nixon meets Mao Zedong, becoming the first president to meet with a Chinese Communist leader face to face.
- April 20, 1972 — Nixon announces plans to reduce U.S. troops in South Vietnam to 49,000 by July 1, 1972.
- August 29, 1972 — Nixon announces the further withdrawal of U.S. troops in South Vietnam to only 27,000 by December 1, 1972.
- November 7, 1972 — Nixon wins re-election.
- January 22, 1973 — Johnson dies.
- January 27, 1973 — U.S. troops are planned to be withdrawn from South Vietnam in 60 days due to the signing of the Paris Peace Accords. North Vietnam and Nixon also agree to withdraw troops from Cambodia and Laos.
- March 29, 1973 — The last American combat troops are withdrawn from Vietnam.
- August 9, 1974 — Nixon resigns due to the Watergate scandal and is succeeded by Gerald Ford.

== Under the Kennedy administration ==
In 1961, the new administration of President John F. Kennedy took a new approach to aiding anti-communist forces in Vietnam which differed from the administrations of Presidents Truman and Eisenhower, who felt the neighboring country Laos was the "cork in the bottle" in combating the threat of Communism in southeast Asia. Kennedy was fearful of the domino effect, that by allowing Vietnam to fall to Communism, the rest of South East Asia would follow suit. In 1961 he asserted:

I think that the struggle is close enough. China is so large, looms so high just beyond the frontiers, that if South Vietnam went, it would not only give them an improved geographic position for a guerrilla assault on Malaysia, but would also give the impression that the wave of the future in southeast Asia was China and the Communists.

During 1961, his first year in office, Kennedy assigned $28.4 million to the enlargement of the South Vietnamese army and $12.7 million to enhance the civil guard. He also found himself faced with a three-part crisis: The failure of the Bay of Pigs invasion in Cuba; the construction of the Berlin Wall by the Soviets; and a negotiated settlement between the pro-Western government of Laos and the Pathet Lao communist movement. Fearing that another failure on the part of the U.S. to stop communist expansion would fatally damage U.S. credibility with its allies, Kennedy realized, "Now we have a problem in making our power credible... and Vietnam looks like the place."

The commitment to defend South Vietnam was reaffirmed by Kennedy on May 11 in National Security Action Memorandum 52, which became known as "The Presidential Program for Vietnam". Its opening statement reads:

U.S. objectives and concept of operations [are] to prevent communist domination of South Vietnam; to create in that country a viable and increasingly democratic society, and to initiate, on an accelerated basis, a series of mutually supporting actions of a military, political, economic, psychological, and covert character designed to achieve this objective.

Nevertheless, the Kennedy administration held onto its fundamental belief in nation building. Kennedy was intrigued by the idea of utilizing United States Army Special Forces for counterinsurgency conflicts in Third World countries threatened by the new "wars of national liberation". Originally intended for use behind front lines after a conventional invasion of Europe, Kennedy believed that the guerrilla tactics employed by Special Forces would be effective in the "brush fire" war in South Vietnam. Thus, in May 1961, Kennedy sent detachments of Green Berets to South Vietnam.

Kennedy had faced much international pressure against his increasing involvement in Vietnam, non the least from Charles De Gaulle on, but Kennedy held steadfast, stating on September 2:

We hope that he comes to see that, but in the final analysis it is the people and the government itself have to win or lose this struggle. All we can do is help, and we are making it very clear, but I don't agree with those who say we should withdraw. That would be a great mistake.

The Diệm regime had been initially able to cope with the VC insurgency in South Vietnam with the aid of U.S. matériel and advisers, and, by 1962, seemed to be gaining the upper hand. Senior U.S. military leaders received positive reports from the U.S. commander, General Paul D. Harkins of the Military Assistance Command, Vietnam, or MACV. By the following year, however, cracks began to appear in the façade of success. In January, a possible victory that was turned into a stunning defeat for government forces at the Battle of Ap Bac caused consternation among both the military advisers in the field and among politicians in Washington, D.C. JFK also indicated to Walter Cronkite that the war might be unwinnable, and that it was ultimately a Vietnamese war, not an American war.

Diệm was already growing unpopular with many of his countrymen because of his administration's nepotism, corruption, and its apparent bias in favor of the Catholic minority—of which Diệm was a part—at the expense of the Buddhist majority. This contributed to the impression of Diệm's rule as an extension of the French Colonial regime. Promised land reforms were not instituted, and Diệm's strategic hamlet program for village self-defense (and government control) was a disaster. Diệm also feared the escalation of American military personnel in South Vietnam, which threatened his nationalist credentials and the independence of his government. He opposed the US sending troops to South Vietnam. The Kennedy administration grew increasingly frustrated with Diệm.

One major frustration among the Kennedy administration was the continued prominent role of Ngo Dinh Nhu, the younger brother of Diem, within the South Vietnamese regime. Nhu held a prominent role in the Diem government, to the chagrin of US officials. Following a meeting with Nhu, Hillsman surmised US frustrations with the Diem government, stating

The American military are still chasing Viet Cong and advising the Vietnamese to chase Viet Cong. They're not adopting the program the President has recommended, our own military are not. Diem has turned the strategic-hamlet program over to Nhu, who's taken the title, the name of it, and nothing else. And in fact, what Diem signed, what we persuaded him to, had not been adopted.

Frustrations boiled over following Nhu's American-trained special forces crackdown on Buddhist pagodas in Hue in 1963. More than 1,400 Buddhists were arrested. Buddhist monks were protesting discriminatory practices and demanding a political voice. The repression of the protests sparked the so-called Buddhist crisis, during which several monks committed self-immolation, which was covered in the world press. The VC took full advantage of the situation and fueled anti-Diệm sentiment to create further instability. In August, the State Department stated:

We wish to give Diem reasonable opportunity to remove Nhu, but if he remains obdurate, then we are prepared to accept the obvious implications that we can no longer support Diem. You may tell appropriate military commanders that we will give them direct support in any interim period of breakdown central government mechanism

It was never, however, the prerogative of the Kennedy administration to remove the Diem government from power. As the McNamara-Taylor report cautioned, "Our policy should be to seek urgently to identify and build contacts with an alternative leadership if and when it appears."

Though reluctant to immediately launch full scale U.S. involvement in the Vietnam conflict, the Kennedy Administration would escalate the number of U.S. troops in Vietnam who acted as advisors to the South Vietnamese military. At the time of Kennedy's assassination in 1963, the number of U.S. military advisors in Vietnam had grown to at least 16,000. Nevertheless, the Kennedy administration had expressed desires to wind down US military intervention, without fully withdrawing from Vietnam. On October 2, 1963, the White House outlined its intentions to withdraw 1,000 men from Vietnam by then end of the year.

=== Fear of communism ===
A major factor that led President Lyndon B. Johnson to intervene into Vietnam militarily was the fear of communism, rooted not only in Cold War geopolitical tensions with countries such as China and the Soviet Union, but also in specific domestic political concerns. South Vietnam was considered a key democratic ally in Southeast Asia, and its potential to fall to communism was seen as a direct threat to regional stability and U.S. credibility. After the intervention of Joseph Stalin and Mao Zedong in the Indochina War, the U.S. was fearful of a repeat of the Korean War. U.S. leaders subscribed to a worldview characterised by sharply defined distinctions between communism and democracy, firmly believing that any communist gains would undermine the broader strategy of containment. The "loss" of China to communism in 1949 played a pivotal role in shaping this mindset, as political opponents relentlessly used it, especially conservatives, to accuse the Democratic party of weakness. This climate was further inflamed by the post-war second Red Scare and "counter-subversion" campaigns, which created a political environment where being seen as "soft on communism" was perceived as a significant vulnerability. These domestic dynamics were often intertwined with gendered political pressures, compelling U.S. leaders to project strength in the face of communist expansion, both internationally and domestically.

=== Gendered political pressures ===
Domestic political pressures, particularly those influenced by Cold War-era ideals of masculinity, played a role in President Lyndon B. Johnson's decision to escalate U.S. involvement in the Vietnam War. Historian, K.A. Cuordileone has argued that the political culture of the 1950s and 1960s emphasized a binary between "hard" and "soft" approaches, where strength and assertiveness were associated with masculinity, while caution and dissent were often portrayed as weak and feminine. Johnson operated within a political environment that, according to Robert Dean, valued a form of "imperial manhood", in which national credibility was linked to displays of masculine strength, a cultural norm reinforced by elite institutions including Ivy League universities. There was use of heavily masculine language within domestic political discourse, highlighting "toughness" and "honour" which ultimately framed discussion surrounding the Vietnam War. Use of language as such was common within the political sphere, also being known as "masculine socialisation". "Masculine socialisation" was rooted in education and upbringing of particularly upper-class men.

The political aftermath of the "loss" of China and the Second Red Scare contributed to Johnson's fear of being held responsible for "losing" Vietnam, not wanting to be labelled as a "unmanly man". Johnson frequently used terms such as "honour", "credibility", and "spine", reflecting the influence of these domestic political gendered norms on his decision making. Scholars like Steinburg have suggested that concerns about political credibility and masculinity were significant factors driving Johnson's escalation of U.S. intervention

=== Lyndon B. Johnson's role ===
A great deal of the blame for U.S. failures in Vietnam has been cast on Johnson by historians. His decision making was motivated by a variety of reasons, including his personal fear of appearing soft on communism, but also his fear of engaging America in another stalemate like the Korean War. It is largely agreed upon that Johnson inherited a complicated situation from his predecessor, Kennedy. Consequently, Johnson faced a difficult situation regarding whether the costs of intervening outweighed the benefits. In essence, America had reached the point of no return. The pride of America and the pride of Johnson as a strong President means that the individual actions and responses of Johnson in Vietnam are somewhat responsible for the failures resulting from U.S. intervention. Johnson himself did not want to appear weak against communism as he feared the backlash from the U.S. public and his Republican rivals. However, public opinion in early 1965 was not uniformly in favour of intervention. While there was concern about the spread of communism, polls indicated that many Americans were hesitant to support the deployment of combat troops. Support for direct military involvement increased temporarily following the deployment of troops, a phenomenon sometimes described as a "rally around the flag" effect, but it began to decline significantly by 1967, as public concerns over the war's cost and progress grew. Johnson also expressed reservations about entering a potentially costly and unpopular conflict. Discussing Vietnam with Senator Richard Russell Jr. in May 1964, he expressed serious concerns about countering guerrilla tactics, the likely ineffectiveness and probable domestic political impact of conducting a bombing campaign in the north, and a number of other factors. Whilst these challenges would have been faced by any President in office at the time, it is ultimately Johnson's individual decisions and attitudes that brought America into the Vietnam War. Historians have been sympathetic towards Johnson's situation, but others believe that the inevitability of war and Johnson's trapping by previous Presidents like John F. Kennedy is a dubious proposal. Fredrick Logevall believes there were choices available to him debate and fluidity was more of a reality than a Cold War consensus as key figures such as Russell opposed the war: "exact numbers are hard to come by, but certainly in the Senate a clear majority of Democrats and moderate Republicans were either downright opposed to Americanisation or were ambivalent".

Robert Dean says McNamara recognised that Johnson could have avoided war in his 1995 memoirs. Dean believes "the basic explanation McNamara offers is that the Kennedy and Johnson policy makers were blinded by their own rigid anti-communist ideology". Arnold R. Isaacs says that there was limited public pressure to escalate war whilst his political position was already safe because of an electoral vote of 486 in the 1964 presidential election. He further suggests escalation posed greater political risks to Johnson than disengagement, particularly due to the potential consequences on his domestic legislative priorities. Johnson feared that a prolonged and costly war would divert attention away from key social reforms and spark political debate. In early 1965, Vice President Hubert Humphrey and several senior Democratic lawmakers, warned that military escalation could destabilise domestic policy, cutting into the Great Society funding. Despite these warnings, Johnson opted to escalate U.S. involvement without a formal declaration of war, pursuing what some critics described as a strategy of waging "war on the sly". This approach allowed Johnson to avoid triggering a full-scale public debate. Analysts have argued that Johnson was aware of the fragile nature of domestic consensus on the war and feared that open debate might expose the extent of elite opposition and jeopardise the administration's domestic policy. According to Isaacs, the view that Johnson was pushed into war by external factors like public pressure and political necessity can be hard to justify and was instead part of the masculine urge to solve international conflicts with war and "that if enough planes could drop enough bombs on a backward Asian country, victory must follow".

=== Laos or Vietnam? ===
According to Seth Jacobs, during the 1950s and 1960s, there was a conceptualisation of Asian nations across a hierarchy of good and bad within the American imagination, which affected US policymakers view of how intervention would materialise. Jacobs states:

Americans at the mid century considered some Asians tough and therefore dependable anticommunist allies while consigning other to the ranks of those who, in the words of a State Department working paper "will not fight for themselves" much less for the free world. No Asian was rated lower in American eyes than the Lao

Jacobs writes that Eisenhower and later Kennedy both "reduced the Lao to a set of stereotypes: childlike, lazy, submissive, unfit to fight the free world's battles". Therefore, Kennedy was dissuaded from sponsoring a military intervention in Laos and instead compromised with the Pathet Lao, which Jacobs argues meant that Kennedy felt he had to intervene elsewhere in Southeast Asia in Vietnam and that the dovish attitude towards Laos was antithetical to the hawkish outlook towards Vietnam. Jacobs argues that Kennedy viewed the Vietnamese people more able to fight communism than the "unfit Lao". Jacobs argues the "American statesmen and the American media constructed a putative Lao national character that differed from South Vietnam's and that made Lao chances of withstanding communist pressure appeal negligible".

== Americanization ==
=== Gulf of Tonkin ===
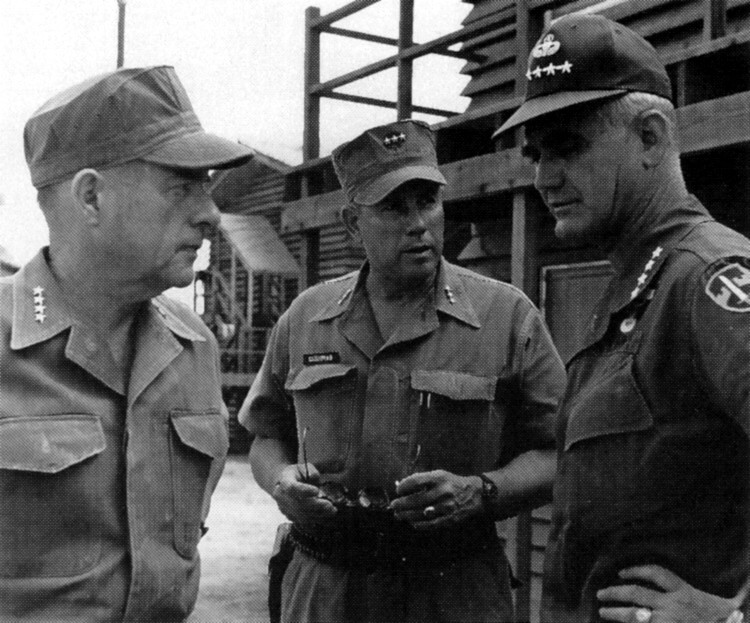
Commandant of the Marine Corps Wallace Greene (left), III MAF commander General Robert Cushman (center), and General Westmoreland (right).

On July 27, 1964, 5,000 additional U.S. military advisers were ordered to South Vietnam, bringing the total American troop level to 21,000. Shortly thereafter an incident occurred off the coast of North Vietnam that was destined to escalate the conflict to new levels and lead to the full scale Americanization of the war.

On the evening of August 2, 1964, the destroyer USS Maddox was conducting an electronic intelligence collection mission in international waters (even as claimed by North Vietnam) in the Gulf of Tonkin when it was attacked by three P-4 torpedo boats of the Vietnam People's Navy. Reports later reached the Johnson administration saying that the Maddox was under attack. Two nights later, after being joined by the destroyer USS Turner Joy, the Maddox again reported that both vessels were under attack. Regardless, Johnson addressed Congress asking for more political power to utilize American military forces in South Vietnam, using the attack on the Maddox as cause to get what he wanted.

Confusion was abound around the circumstance of the attacks. The Turner Joy's reports of the second attack were met with scepticism from many U.S. officials. While it is 'indisputable' that the first attack occurred, the evidence of the second attack, McNamara contends, "appears probable but not certain". This incited rampant confusion in Washington. Nevertheless, the incident was seen by the administration as the perfect opportunity to present Congress with "a pre-dated declaration of war" in order to strengthen weakening morale in South Vietnam through reprisal attacks by the U.S. on the North. The attack was pivotal in justifying the Johnson administration's intensification of the war. Even before confirmation of the phantom attack had been received in Washington, Johnson had decided that an attack could not go unanswered. Johnson ordered attacks on North Vietnamese naval bases almost immediately, and capitalised on the incident by convincing congress to accept intensified military action in Vietnam.

Neither Congress nor the American people learned the whole story about the events in the Gulf of Tonkin until the publication of the Pentagon Papers in 1969. It was on the basis of the administration's assertions that the attacks were "unprovoked aggression" on the part of North Vietnam, that the United States Congress approved the Southeast Asia Resolution (also known as the Gulf of Tonkin Resolution) on August 7. The law gave the President broad powers to conduct military operations without an actual declaration of war. The resolution passed unanimously in the House of Representatives and was opposed in the Senate by only two members.

National Security Council members, including Secretary of Defense Robert McNamara, Secretary of State Dean Rusk, and General Maxwell Taylor, agreed on November 28 to recommend that Johnson adopt a plan for a two-stage escalation of the bombing of North Vietnam.

=== Operation Rolling Thunder, 1965–68 ===
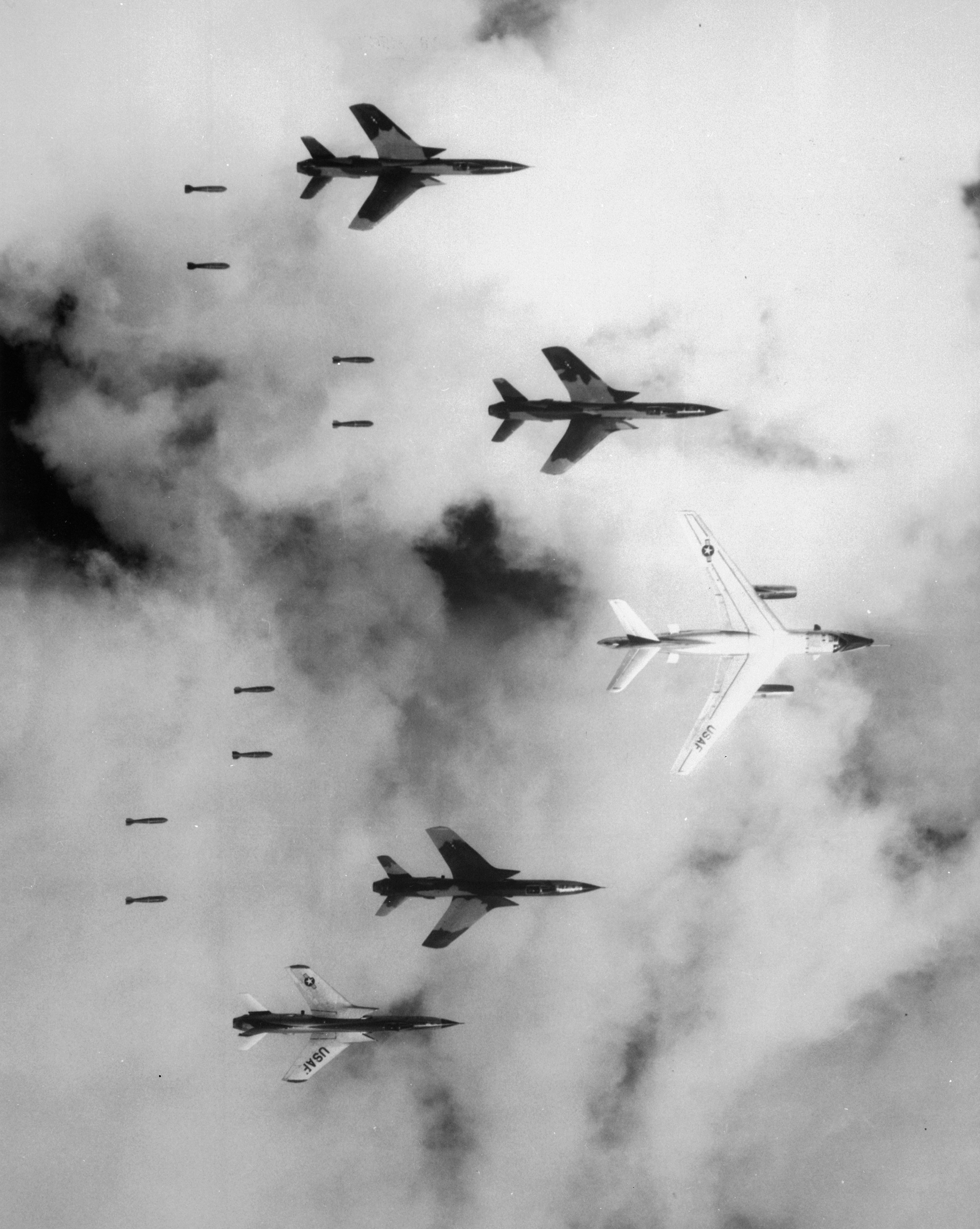
U.S. F-105 aircraft dropping bombs.

In February 1965, a U.S. air base at Pleiku, in the Central Highlands of South Vietnam, was attacked twice by the VC, resulting in the deaths of over a dozen U.S. personnel. These guerrilla attacks prompted the administration to order retaliatory air strikes against North Vietnam.

Operation Rolling Thunder was the code name given to a sustained strategic bombing campaign targeted against the North by aircraft of the U.S. Air Force and Navy that was inaugurated on March 2, 1965. Its original purpose was to bolster the morale of the South Vietnamese and to serve as a signaling device to Hanoi. U.S. airpower would act as a method of "strategic persuasion", deterring the North Vietnamese politically by the fear of continued or increased bombardment. Rolling Thunder gradually escalated in intensity, with aircraft striking only carefully selected targets. When that did not work, its goals were altered to destroying North Vietnam's will to fight by destroying the nation's industrial base, transportation network, and its (continually increasing) air defenses. After more than 300,000 sorties were flown and three-quarters of a million tons of bombs were dropped, Rolling Thunder was ended on November 11, 1968.

Other aerial campaigns (Operation Barrel Roll, Operation Steel Tiger, Operation Tiger Hound, and Operation Commando Hunt) were directed to counter the flow of men and material down the People's Army of Vietnam (PAVN) logistical system that flowed from North Vietnam through southeastern Laos, and into South Vietnam known as the Ho Chi Minh Trail. These operations as a whole were an expensive failure - the bombings, despite the devastation did not stop the flow of supplies coming down the Ho Chi Minh Trail.

=== Build-up ===
Johnson had already appointed General William C. Westmoreland to succeed General Paul Harkins as commander of MACV in June 1964. Under Westmoreland, the expansion of American troop strength in South Vietnam took place. American forces rose from 16,000 during 1964 to more than 553,000 by 1969. With the U.S. decision to escalate its involvement it had created the Many Flags program to legitimize intervention and ANZUS Pact allies Australia and New Zealand agreed to contribute troops and material to the conflict. They were joined by the Republic of Korea, Thailand, and the Philippines. The U.S. paid for (through aid dollars) and logistically supplied all of the allied forces. As the manpower demand increased to meet these obligations McNamara initiated Project 100,000 which witnessed a significant reduction in recruiting standards for the U.S. military.

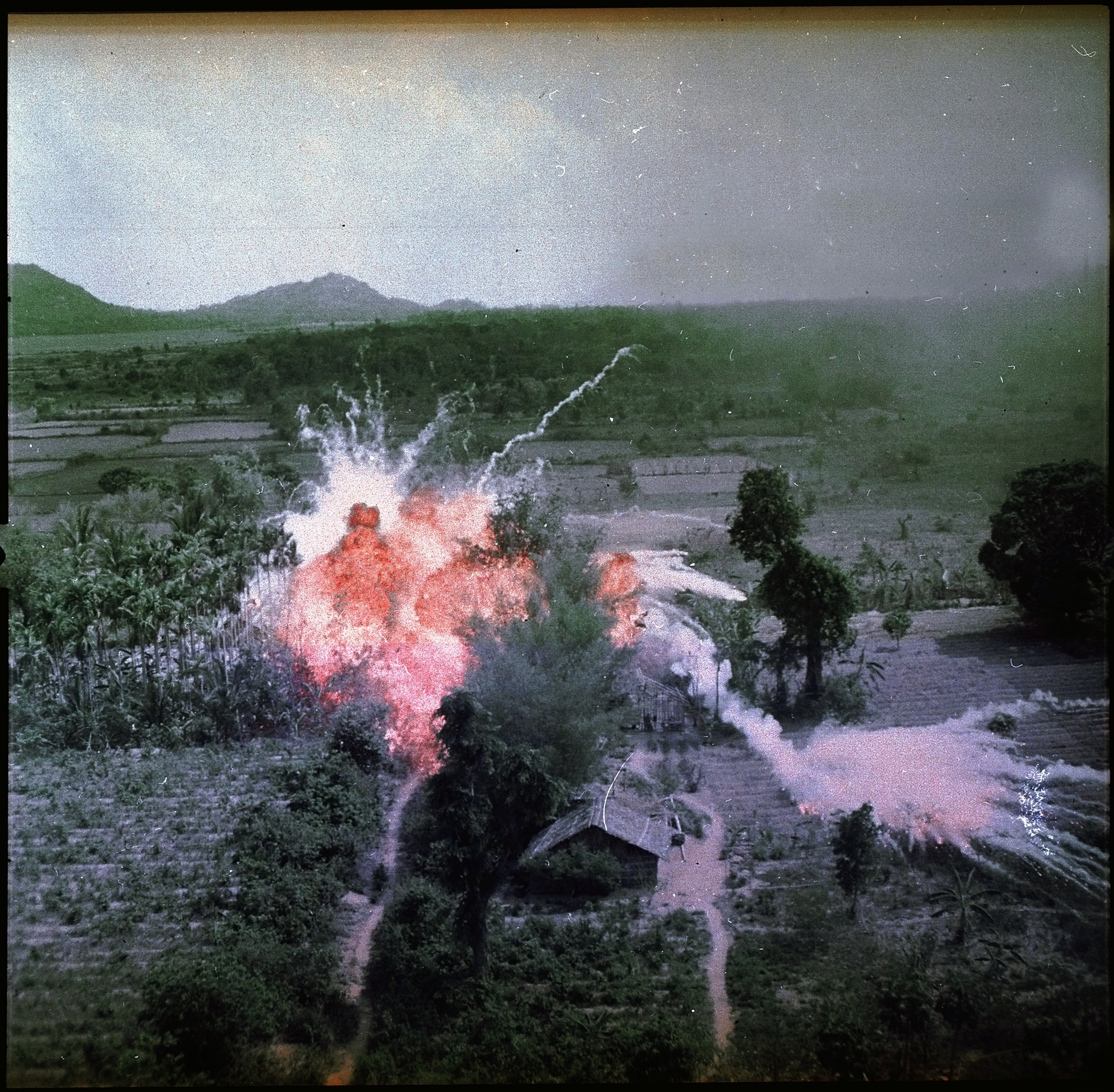
U.S. aircraft bombs VC positions in 1965.

Meanwhile, political affairs in Saigon were finally settling down — at least as far as the Americans were concerned. On February 14 the most recent military junta, the National Leadership Committee, installed Air Vice-Marshal Nguyễn Cao Kỳ as prime minister. In 1966, the junta selected General Nguyễn Văn Thiệu to run for president with Ky on the ballot as the vice-presidential candidate in the 1967 election. On April 1, 1967, a new constitution was promulgated and the Second Republic of Vietnam was established in South Vietnam. Presidential and bicameral elections would be held a few months later. Thiệu and Kỳ were elected and remained in office for the duration of the war. In the presidential election of 1971, Thieu ran for the presidency unopposed.

With the advent of Rolling Thunder, American airbases and facilities needed to be constructed and manned for the aerial effort. On March 8, 1965, 3,500 United States Marines came ashore at Da Nang as the first wave of U.S. combat troops into South Vietnam, adding to the 25,000 U.S. military advisers already in place. Although the landing was approved by the South Vietnamese government before, the details of the landing location and time were decided by the United States without prior notice to South Vietnam. Instead the initial deployment and gradual build-up was a unilateral decision by the US government. On May 5 the U.S. 173rd Airborne Brigade became the first U.S. Army ground unit committed to the conflict in South Vietnam. On August 18, Operation Starlite began as the first major U.S. ground operation, destroying a VC stronghold in Quảng Ngãi Province.

The North Vietnamese had already sent units of their regular army into southern Vietnam beginning in late 1964. Some officials in Hanoi had favored an immediate invasion of the South, and a plan was developed to use PAVN units to split southern Vietnam in half through the Central Highlands. The two adversaries first faced one another during Operation Silver Bayonet, better known as the Battle of the Ia Drang. During the savage fighting that took place, both sides learned important lessons. The North Vietnamese began to adapt to the overwhelming American superiority in air mobility, supporting arms, and close air support by moving in as close as possible during confrontations, thereby negating the effects of the above.

=== Search and destroy, the strategy of attrition ===
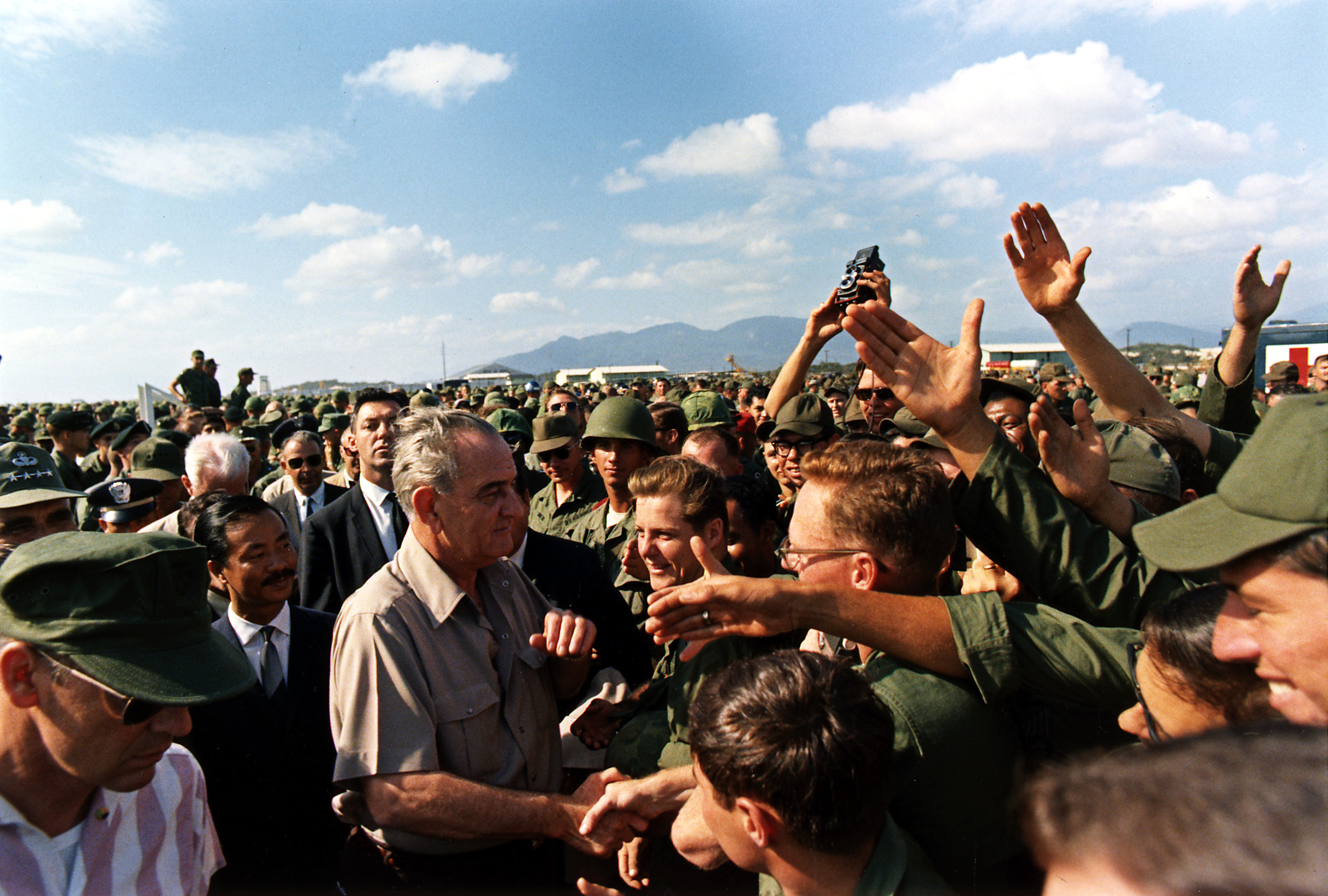
President Lyndon B. Johnson in Vietnam, 1967

On November 27, 1965, the Pentagon declared that if the major operations needed to neutralize North Vietnamese and VC forces were to succeed, U.S. troop levels in South Vietnam would have to be increased from 120,000 to 400,000. In a series of meetings between Westmoreland and Johnson held in Honolulu in February 1966, Westmoreland claimed that the U.S. presence had succeeded in preventing the immediate defeat of the South Vietnamese government but that more troops would be necessary if systematic offensive operations were to be conducted. The issue then became in what manner American forces would be used.

The nature of the American military's strategic and tactical decisions made during this period colored the conflict for the duration of the American commitment. The logistical system in Laos and Cambodia should be cut by ground forces, isolating the southern battlefield. However, political considerations limited U.S. military actions, mainly because of the memory of Chinese reactions during the Korean War. Ever present in the minds of diplomats, military officers, and politicians was the possibility of a spiraling escalation of the conflict into a superpower confrontation and the possibility of a nuclear exchange. Therefore, there would be no invasion of North Vietnam, the "neutrality" of Laos and Cambodia would be respected, and Rolling Thunder would not resemble the bombing of Germany and Japan during the Second World War.

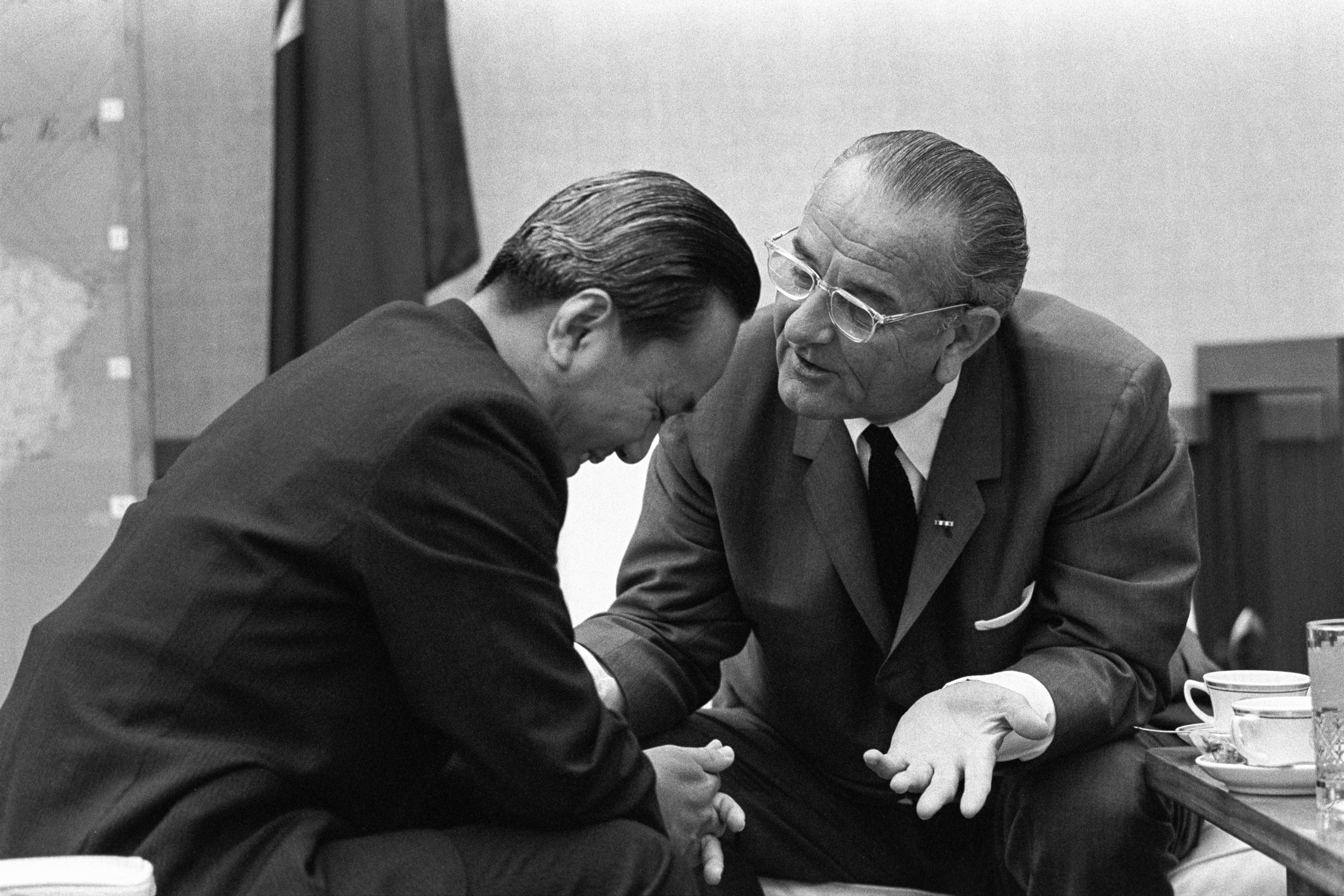
President Johnson conferring with South Vietnamese President Nguyễn Văn Thiệu in July 1968.

These limitations were not foisted upon the military as an afterthought. Before the first U.S. soldiers came ashore at Da Nang, the Pentagon was cognizant of all of the parameters that would be imposed by their civilian leaders, yet they still agreed that the mission could be accomplished within them. Westmoreland believed that he had found a strategy that would either defeat North Vietnam or force it into serious negotiations. Attrition was to be the key. The general held that larger offensive operations would grind down the communists and eventually lead to a "crossover point" in PAVN/VC casualties after which a decisive (or at least political) victory would be possible.

It is widely held that the average U.S. serviceman was 19 years old, as evidenced by the casual reference in a pop song ("19" by Paul Hardcastle); the figure is cited by Lt. Col. Dave Grossman ret. of the Killology Research Group in his 1995 book On Killing: The Psychological Cost of Learning to Kill in War and Society (p. 265). However, it is disputed by the Vietnam Helicopter Flight Crew Network Website, which claims the average age of MOS 11B personnel was 22. This compares with 26 years of age for those who participated in World War II. Soldiers served a one-year tour of duty. The average age of the U.S. military men who died in Vietnam was 22.8 years old.

The one-year tour of duty deprived units of experienced leadership. As one observer put it, "we were not in Vietnam for 10 years, but for one year 10 times."

American forces would conduct operations against PAVN forces, pushing them further back into the countryside away from the heavily populated coastal lowlands. In the backcountry the U.S. could fully utilize its superiority in firepower and mobility to bleed the enemy in set-piece battles. The cleaning-out of the VC and the pacification of the villages would be the responsibility of the South Vietnamese military. The adoption of this strategy, however, brought Westmoreland into direct conflict with his Marine Corps commander, General Lewis W. Walt, who had already recognized the security of the villages as the key to success. Walt had immediately commenced pacification efforts in his area of responsibility, but Westmoreland was unhappy, believing that the Marines were being underutilized and fighting the wrong enemy. In the end, MACV won out and Westmoreland's search and destroy concept, predicated on the attrition of enemy forces, won the day.

Both sides chose similar strategies. PAVN, which had been operating a more conventional, large-unit war, switched back to small-unit operations in the face of U.S. military capabilities. The struggle moved to the villages, where the "hearts and minds" of the South Vietnamese peasants, whose cooperation was absolutely necessary to military success, would be won or lost. The U.S. had given responsibility for this struggle to the Army of the Republic of Vietnam (ARVN), whose troops and commanders were notoriously unfit for the task.

For the American soldier, whose doctrine was one of absolute commitment to total victory, this strategy led to a frustrating small-unit war. Most of the combat was conducted by units smaller than battalion-size (the majority at the platoon level). Since the goal of the operations was to kill the enemy, terrain was not taken and held as in previous wars. Savage fighting and the retreat of the communists was immediately followed by the abandonment of the terrain just seized. Combined with this was the anger and frustration engendered among American troops by the effective tactics of the NLF, who conducted a war of sniping, booby traps, mines, and terror against the Americans.

As a result of the conference held in Honolulu, Johnson authorized an increase in troop strength to 429,000 by August 1966. The large increase in troops enabled MACV to carry out numerous operations that grew in size and complexity during the next two years. For U.S. troops participating in these operations (Operation Masher/White Wing, Operation Attleboro, Operation Cedar Falls, Operation Junction City and dozens of others) the war boiled down to hard marching through some of the most difficult terrain on the planet and weather conditions that were alternately hot and dry, or cold and wet. It was the PAVN/VC that actually controlled the pace of the war, fighting only when their commanders believed that they had the upper hand and then disappearing when the Americans and/or ARVN brought their superiority in numbers and firepower to bear. North Vietnam, utilizing the Ho Chi Minh and Sihanouk Trails, matched the U.S. at every point of the escalation, funneling manpower and supplies to the southern battlefields.

During the Vietnam War, the use of the helicopter, known as "Air Mobile", was an essential tool for conducting the war. In fact, the whole conduct and strategy of the war depended on it. Vietnam was the first time the helicopter was used on a major scale, and in such important roles. Search and destroy missions, for example, would have been nearly impossible without it. Helicopters allowed American commanders to move large numbers of troops to virtually anywhere, regardless of the terrain or roads. Troops could also be easily resupplied in remote areas. The helicopter also provided another new and vital capability: medical evacuation. It could fly wounded soldiers to aid stations very quickly, usually within the critical first hour. This gave wounded soldiers a higher chance of survival in Vietnam than in any previous war. The helicopter was also adapted for many other roles in Vietnam, including ground attack, reconnaissance, and electronic warfare. Without the helicopter, the war would have been fought very differently.

=== Tactical nuclear weapons and cluster bombs ===
Although the use of nuclear weapons was proposed as a contingency plan by the military, Johnson shut this idea down, approving instead the use of cluster bombs (termed Controlled Fragmentation Munition or COFRAM by the military) In the 1964 presidential campaign, Johnson presented himself as the candidate who would be less willing to use nuclear weapons (see "Daisy" ad). As President, Johnson urged the military not to give the president the authority to use tactical nuclear weapons in Vietnam. Throughout the war, President Johnson did not change his stance on the use of tactical nuclear weapons against the Vietcong.

=== Border battles and the Tet Offensive ===
By mid-1967, Westmoreland said that it was conceivable that U.S. forces could be phased out of the war within two years, turning over progressively more of the fighting to the ARVN. That fall, however, savage fighting broke out in the northern provinces. Beginning below the DMZ at Con Thien and then spreading west to the Laotian border near Dak To, large PAVN forces began to stand their ground and fight. This willingness of the communists to remain fixed in place inspired MACV to send reinforcements from other sectors of South Vietnam.

Most of the PAVN/VC operational capability was possible only because of the unhindered movement of men along the Ho Chi Minh Trail. To threaten this flow of supplies, the Marine Corps established a combat base on the South Vietnamese side of the Laotian frontier, near the village of Khe Sanh. The U.S. used the base as a border surveillance position overlooking Route 9, the only east–west road that crossed the border in the province. Westmoreland also hoped to use the base as a jump-off point for any future incursion against the Trail system in Laos. During the spring of 1967, a series of small-unit actions near Khe Sanh prompted MACV to increase its forces. These small unit actions and increasing intelligence information indicated that the PAVN was building up significant forces just across the border.

Indeed, PAVN was doing just that. Two regular divisions (and later elements of a third) were moving toward Khe Sanh, eventually surrounding the base and cutting off its only road access. Westmoreland, contrary to the advice of his Marine commanders, reinforced the outpost. As far as he was concerned, if the PAVN were willing to mass their forces for destruction by American air power, so much the better. He described the ideal outcome as a "Dien Bien Phu in reverse". MACV then launched the largest concentrated aerial bombardment effort of the conflict (Operation Niagara) to defend Khe Sanh. Another massive aerial effort was undertaken to keep the beleaguered Marines supplied. There were many comparisons (by the media, Americans military and political officials, and the North Vietnamese) to the possibility of PAVN staging a repeat of its victory at Dien Bien Phu, but the differences outweighed the similarities in any comparison.

MACV used this opportunity to field its latest technology against the North Vietnamese. A sensor-driven, anti-infiltration system known as Operation Igloo White was in the process of being field tested in Laos as the siege of Khe Sanh began. Westmoreland ordered that it be employed to detect PAVN troop movements near the base and the system worked well. By March, the long-awaited ground assault against the base had failed to materialize and communist forces began to melt back toward Laos. MACV (and future historians) were left with only questions. What was the goal of the PAVN? Was the siege a real attempt to stage another Dien Bien Phu? Or had the battles near the border (which eventually drew in half of MACV's maneuver battalions) been a diversion, meant to pull forces away from the cities, where another PAVN offensive would soon commence?

Westmoreland's public reassurances that "the light at the end of the tunnel" was near were countered when, on January 30, 1968, PAVN and VC forces broke the truce that accompanied the Tết holiday and mounted their largest offensive thus far, in hopes of sparking a general uprising among the South Vietnamese. These forces, ranging in size from small groups to entire regiments, attacked nearly every city and major military installation in South Vietnam. The Americans and South Vietnamese, initially surprised by the scope and scale of the offensive, quickly responded and inflicted severe casualties on their enemies. The VC was essentially eliminated as a fighting force and the places of the dead within its ranks were increasingly filled by North Vietnamese.

The PAVN/VC attacks were speedily and bloodily repulsed in virtually all areas except Saigon, where the fighting lasted for three days, and in the old imperial capital of Huế, where it continued for a month. During the occupation of the historic city, 2,800 South Vietnamese were murdered by the VC in the single worst massacre of the conflict. The hoped-for uprising never took place; indeed, the offensive drove some previously apathetic South Vietnamese to fight for the government. Another surprise for the North was that the ARVN did not collapse under the onslaught, instead turning in a performance that pleased even its American patrons.

After the Tet Offensive, influential news magazines and newspapers, including the Wall Street Journal, Time and The New York Times, increasingly began to characterize the war as a stalemate. What shocked and dismayed the American public was the realization that either it had been lied to or that the American military command had been dangerously overoptimistic in its appraisal of the situation in Vietnam. The public could not understand how such an attack was possible after being told for several years that victory was just around the corner. The Tet Offensive came to embody the growing credibility gap at the heart of U.S. government statements. These realizations and changing attitudes forced the American public (and politicians) to face hard realities and to reexamine their position in Southeast Asia. Moreover, the U.S. media coverage made it even more clear that an overall victory in Vietnam was not imminent. It also massively weakened the domestic support for the Johnson administration at the time. The days of an open-ended commitment to the conflict were over.

The psychological impact of the Tet Offensive effectively ended Johnson's political career. On March 11, Senator Eugene McCarthy won 42 percent of the vote in the Democratic New Hampshire primary. Although Johnson was not on the ballot, commentators viewed this as a defeat for the President. Shortly thereafter, Senator Robert F. Kennedy announced his intention to seek the Democratic nomination for the 1968 presidential election. On March 31, in a speech that took America and the world by surprise, Johnson announced that "I shall not seek, and I will not accept the nomination of my party for another term as your President" and pledged himself to devoting the rest of his term in office to the search for peace in Vietnam. Johnson announced that he was limiting bombing of North Vietnam to just north of the DMZ and that U.S. representatives were prepared to meet with North Vietnamese counterparts in any suitable place "to discuss the means to bring this ugly war to an end". A few days later, much to Johnson's surprise, North Vietnam agreed to contacts between the two sides. On May 13, what became known as the Paris peace talks began.

Due to the ever-increasing demands for manpower and the unpopularity of the war, Army recruiting standards were lowered and training programs were shortened. Some NCOs were referred to as "Shake 'N' Bake" to highlight their accelerated training. Unlike soldiers in World War II and Korea, there were no secure rear areas in which to get rest and relaxation. One unidentified soldier said to United Press International that there was nothing to do in Vietnam and therefore many of the men smoked marijuana. He said, "One of the biggest reasons that a lot of GIs do get high over here is there is nothing to do. This place is really a drag; it's a bore over here. Like right now sitting around here, we are getting loaded. Whereas, it doesn't really get you messed up; that's I guess the main reason why we smoke it."

=== My Lai massacre ===
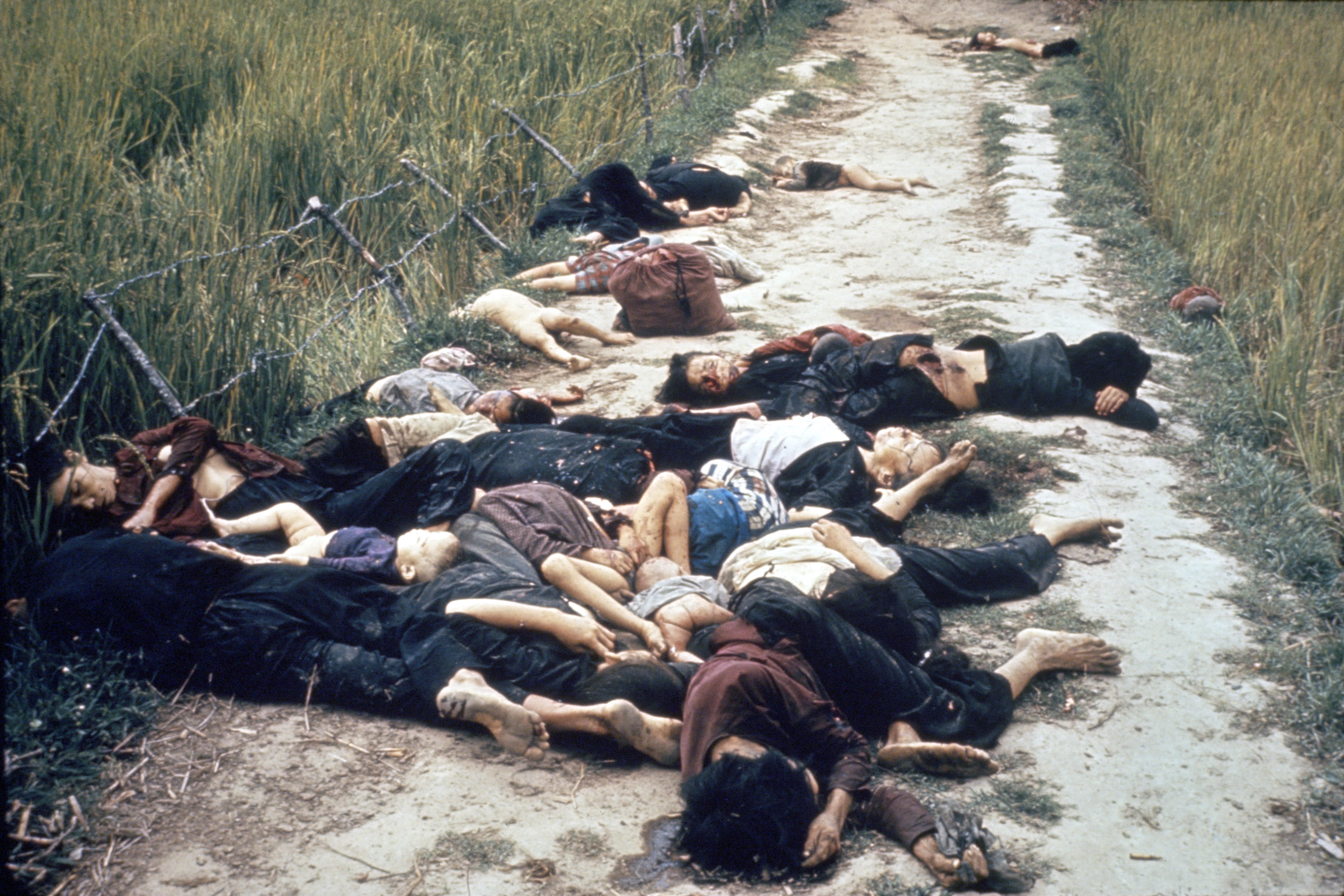
U.S. Army photo of Vietnamese civilians killed during the My Lai massacre.

On March 16, 1968, three companies of Task Force Barker, part of the Americal Division, took part in a search and destroy operation near the village of My Lai, in Quang Ngai Province. Lieutenant William Calley personally ordered the executions of hundreds of villagers in large groups. The killings ended only when an American helicopter crew, headed by Warrant Officer Hugh Thompson, Jr., discovered Calley's unit in the act and threatened to attack them with his aircraft's weapons unless they stopped. One of the soldiers on the scene was Ron Haeberle, a photographer for the newspaper Stars and Stripes, who took unobtrusive official black-and-white photos of the operation through the lens of his military-issued camera and color shots of the massacre with his personal camera. Although the operation appeared suspicious to Calley's superiors, it was forgotten.

In 1969, investigative journalist Seymour Hersh exposed the My Lai massacre in print, and the Haeberle photos were released to the world media. The Pentagon launched an investigation headed by General William R. Peers to look into the allegations. After a flurry of activity, the Peers Commission issued its report. It declared that "an atmosphere of atrocity" surrounded the event, concluding that a massacre had taken place and the crime had been covered up by the commander of the Americal Division and his executive officer. Perhaps 400 Vietnamese civilians, mostly old men, women, and children had been killed by Charlie company. Several men were charged in the killings, but only Calley was convicted. He was given a life sentence by a court-martial in 1970, but after numerous appeals, he was finally set free; he had served just over three years of house arrest.

Although My Lai generated a lot of civilian recriminations and bad publicity for the military, it was not the only massacre. The Vietnam War Crimes Working Group Files made public in 1994 by the "Freedom of Information Act" reveals seven, albeit much smaller, massacres previously unacknowledged by the Pentagon, in which at least 137 civilians had died. Cover-ups may have occurred in other cases, as detailed in the Pulitzer Prize-winning series of articles concerning the Tiger Force of the 101st Airborne Division by the Toledo Blade in 2003.

== Vietnamization, 1969–73 ==
Richard Nixon had campaigned in the 1968 presidential election under the slogan that he had a secret plan to end the war in Vietnam and bring "peace with honor". However, there was no plan to do this, and the American commitment continued for another five years. The goal of the American military effort was to buy time, gradually building up the strength of the South Vietnamese armed forces, and re-equipping it with modern weapons so that they could defend their nation on their own. This policy became the cornerstone of the so-called Nixon Doctrine. As applied to Vietnam, it was labeled Vietnamization.

Nixon's papers show that in 1968, as a presidential candidate, he ordered Anna Chennault, his liaison to the South Vietnam government, to persuade them to refuse a cease-fire being brokered by Johnson.

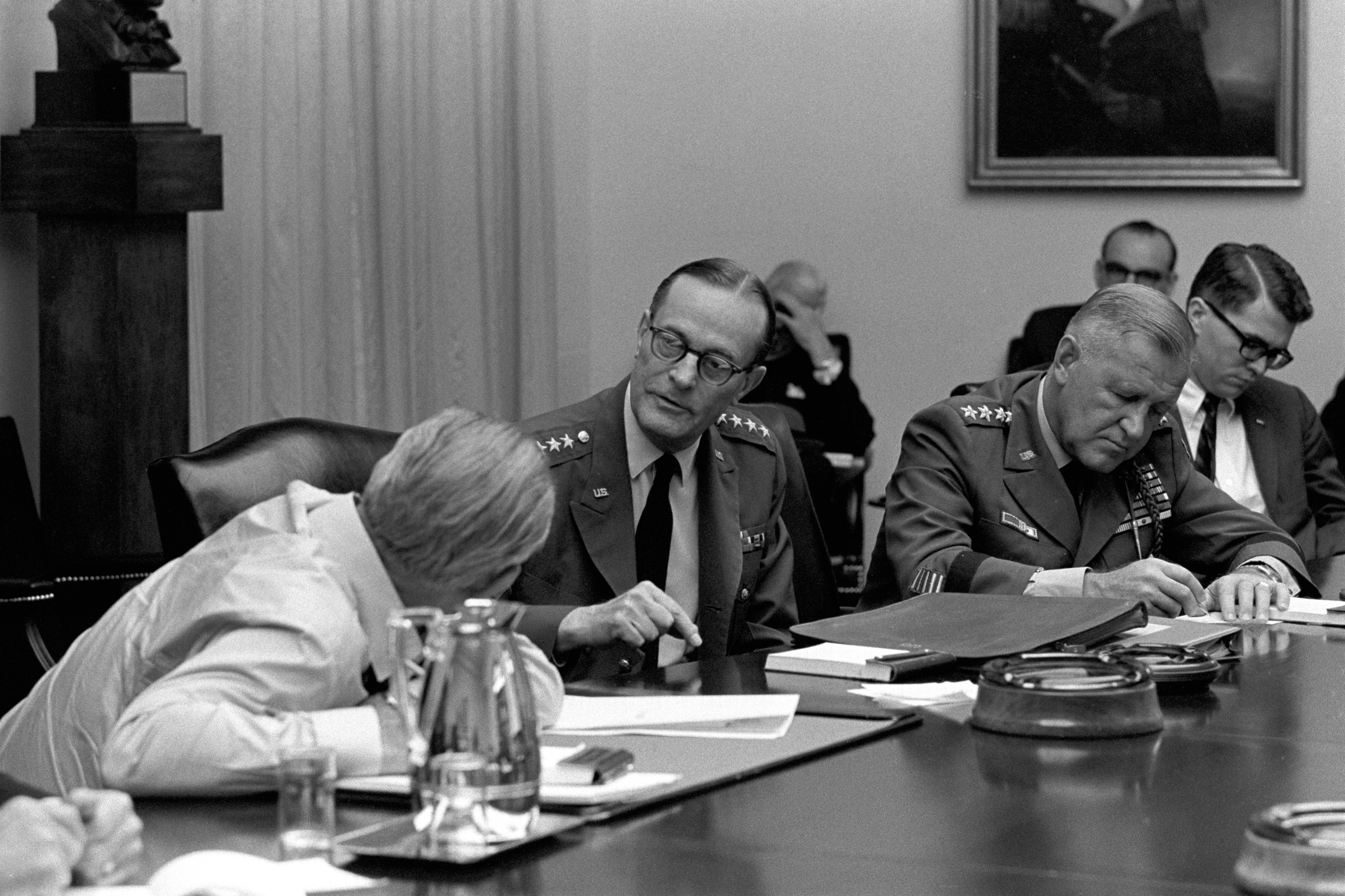
President Johnson in conversation with Chairman of the Joint Chiefs of Staff Earle Wheeler (center) and General Creighton Abrams (right).

Soon after Tet, Westmoreland was promoted to Army Chief of Staff and he was replaced by his deputy, General Creighton W. Abrams. Because of the change in American strategy posed by Vietnamization, Abrams pursued a very different approach. The U.S. was gradually withdrawing from the conflict, and Abrams favored smaller-scale operations aimed at PAVN/VC logistics, more openness with the media, less indiscriminate use of American firepower, elimination of the body count as the key indicator of battlefield success, and more meaningful cooperation with South Vietnamese forces.

Vietnamization of the war, however, created a dilemma for U.S. forces: the strategy required that U.S. troops fight long enough for the ARVN to improve enough to hold its own against PAVN/VC forces. Morale in the U.S. ranks rapidly declined during 1969–1972, as evidenced by declining discipline, worsening drug use among soldiers, and increased "fraggings" of U.S. officers by disgruntled troops.

One of Nixon's main foreign policy goals had been the achievement of a breakthrough in U.S. relations with the People's Republic of China and the Soviet Union. An avowed anti-communist since early in his political career, Nixon could make diplomatic overtures to the communists without being accused of being "soft on communism". The result of his overtures was an era of détente that led to nuclear arms reductions by the U.S. and Soviet Union and the beginning of a dialogue with China. In this context, Nixon viewed Vietnam as simply another limited conflict forming part of the larger tapestry of superpower relations; however, he was still determined to preserve South Vietnam until such time as he could not be blamed for what he saw as its inevitable collapse (or a "decent interval", as it was known). To this end he and National Security Advisor Henry Kissinger employed Chinese and Soviet foreign policy gambits to successfully defuse some of the anti-war opposition at home and secured movement at the negotiations that had begun in Paris.

China and the Soviet Union had been the principal backers of North Vietnam's effort through large-scale military and financial aid. The two communist superpowers had competed with one another to prove their "fraternal socialist links" with the regime in Hanoi. The North Vietnamese had become adept at playing the two nations off against one another. Even with Nixon's rapprochement, their support of North Vietnam increased significantly in the years leading up to the U.S. departure in 1973, enabling the North Vietnamese to mount full-scale conventional offensives against the South, complete with tanks, heavy artillery, and the most modern surface-to-air missiles.

=== Pentagon Papers ===
The credibility of the U.S. government again suffered in 1971 when The New York Times, The Washington Post and other newspapers serially published The Pentagon Papers (actually U.S.-Vietnam Relations, 1945–1967). This top-secret historical study of the American commitment in Vietnam, from the Franklin Roosevelt administration until 1967, had been contracted to the RAND Corporation by Secretary of Defense McNamara. The documents were leaked to the press by Daniel Ellsberg, a former State Department official who had worked on the study.

The Pentagon Papers laid out the missteps taken by four administrations in their Vietnam policies. For example, they revealed the Johnson administration's obfuscations to Congress concerning the Gulf of Tonkin incidents that had led to direct U.S. intervention; they exposed the clandestine bombing of Laos that had begun in 1964; and they detailed the American government's complicity in the death of Diệm. The study presented a continuously pessimistic view of the likelihood of victory and generated fierce criticism of U.S. policies.

The importance of the actual content of the papers to U.S. policy-making was disputed, but the window that they provided into the flawed decision-making process at the highest levels of the U.S. government opened the issue for other questions. Their publication was a news event and the government's legal (Nixon lost to the Supreme Court) and extra-legal efforts (the "Plumbers" break-in at the office of Ellsberg's psychiatrist committed to gain material to discredit him, was one of the first steps on the road to Watergate) carried out to prevent their publication—mainly on national security grounds—then went on to generate yet more criticism and suspicion of the government by the American public.

=== Operation Menu and the Cambodian campaign, 1969–70 ===
By 1969 the policy of non-alignment and neutrality had worn thin for Prince Norodom Sihanouk, ruler of Cambodia. Pressures from the right in Cambodia caused the prince to begin a shift away from the pro-left position he had assumed in 1965–1966. He began to make overtures for normalized relations with the U.S. and created a Government of National Salvation with the assistance of the pro-American General Lon Nol. Seeing a shift in the prince's position, Nixon ordered the launching of Operation Menu, atop-secret bombing campaign, targeted at the PAVN/VC base areas and sanctuaries along Cambodia's eastern border.

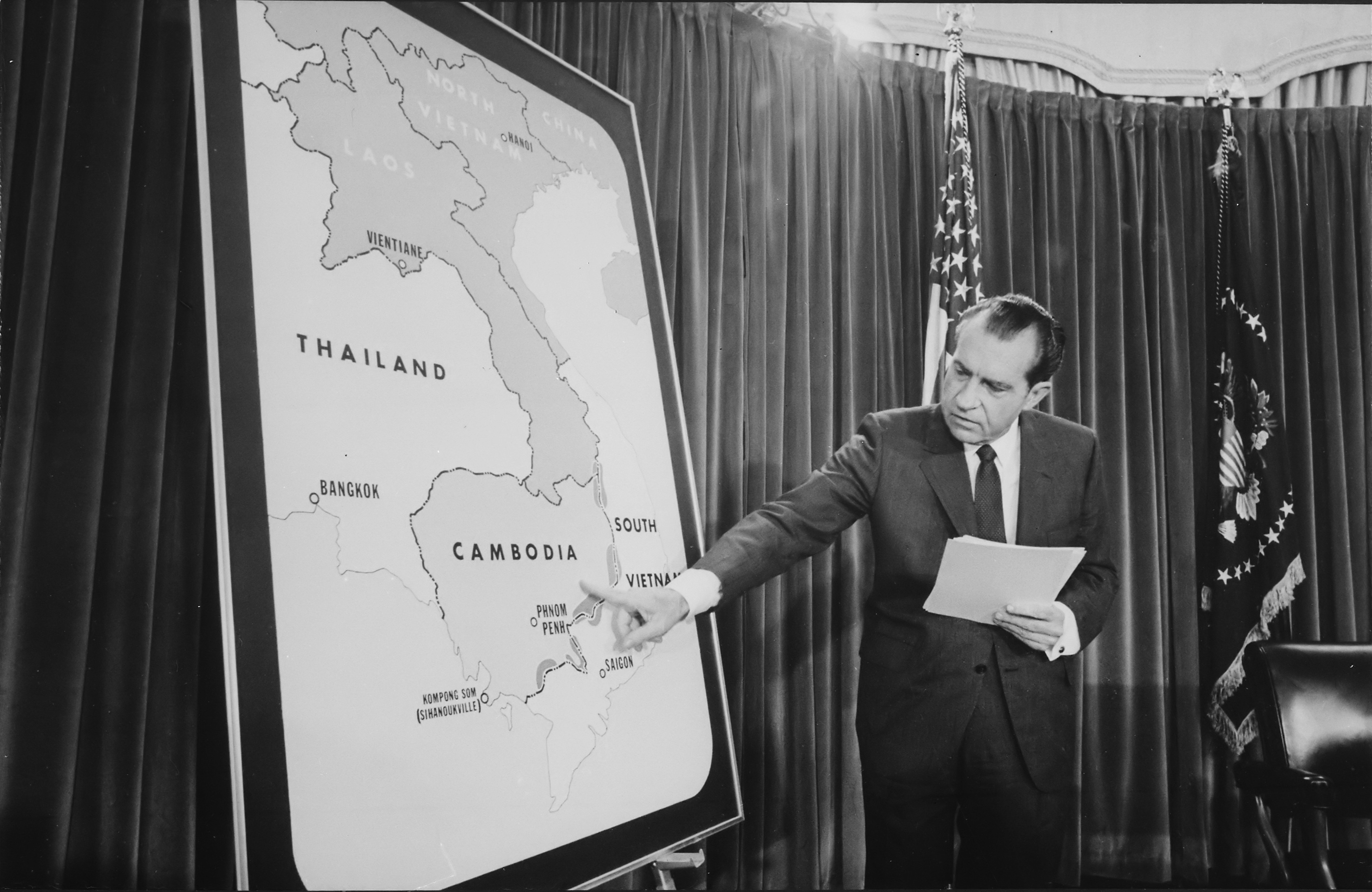
President Nixon explains the expansion of the war into Cambodia.

On March 18, 1970, Sihanouk, who was out of the country on a state visit, was removed by a vote of the National Assembly and replaced by Lon Nol. Cambodia's ports were immediately closed to North Vietnamese military supplies, and the government demanded that PAVN/VC forces be removed from the border areas within 72 hours. On March 29, 1970, the Vietnamese had taken matters into their own hands and launched an offensive against the Cambodian army. A PAVN force quickly overran large parts of eastern Cambodia reaching to within 15 miles (24 km) of Phnom Penh allowing their allies, the Chinese-supported Khmer Rouge to extend their power. Nixon ordered a military incursion into Cambodia by U.S. and ARVN troops in order to both destroy PAVN/VC sanctuaries bordering South Vietnam and to buy time for the U.S. withdrawal. During the Cambodian Campaign, U.S. and ARVN forces discovered and removed or destroyed a huge logistical and intelligence haul in Cambodia.

The incursion also sparked large-scale demonstrations on and closures of American college campuses. The expansion of the conflict into Cambodia was seen as an expansion of the conflict into yet another country, nullifying Nixon's promises of de-escalating the war. During the ensuing protests, four students were killed and a score were wounded by Ohio National Guardsmen during a demonstration at Kent State University. Two other students were killed at Jackson State University in Mississippi. In an effort to lessen opposition to the U.S. commitment, Nixon announced on October 12 that the U.S. would withdraw 40,000 more troops from Vietnam before Christmas.

Following the coup, Sihanouk arrived in Beijing, where he established and headed a government in exile, throwing his substantial personal support behind the Khmer Rouge, the North Vietnamese, and the Laotian Pathet Lao.

=== Lam Son 719 ===
In 1971 the U.S. authorized the ARVN to carry out an offensive operation aimed at cutting the Ho Chi Minh Trail in southeastern Laos. Besides attacking the PAVN logistical system (which would buy time for the U.S. withdrawal) the incursion would be a significant test of Vietnamization. Backed by U.S. air and artillery support (American troops were forbidden to enter Laos), the ARVN moved across the border along Route 9, utilizing the abandoned Khe Sanh Combat Base as a jumping-off point. At first, the incursion went well, but unlike the Cambodian operation of 1970, the PAVN decided to stand and fight, finally mustering around 60,000 men on the battlefield.

The PAVN first struck the flanks of the ARVN column, smashed its outposts, and then moved in on the main ARVN force. Unlike previous encounters during the conflict, the PAVN fielded armored formations, heavy artillery, and large amounts of the latest anti-aircraft artillery. After two months of savage fighting, the ARVN retreated back across the border, closely pursued by the PAVN. One half of the invasion force was killed or captured during the operation, and Vietnamization was seen as a failure.

On August 18, Australia and New Zealand decided to withdraw their troops from the conflict. The total number of U.S. forces in South Vietnam dropped to 196,700 on October 29, 1971, the lowest level since January 1966. On November 12, 1971, Nixon set a February 1, 1972 deadline for the removal of another 45,000 troops.

=== Easter Offensive ===
Vietnamization received another severe test in the spring of 1972 when the North Vietnamese launched a massive conventional offensive across the DMZ. Beginning on March 30, the Easter Offensive (known as the Nguyễn Huệ Offensive to the North Vietnamese) quickly overran the three northernmost provinces of South Vietnam, including the provincial capital of Quảng Trị. PAVN forces then drove south toward Huế.

Early in April, the PAVN opened two additional operations. The first, a three-division thrust supported by tanks and heavy artillery, advanced out of Cambodia on April 5. The PAVN seized the town of Loc Ninh and advanced toward the provincial capital of An Lộc in Bình Long Province. The second new offensive, launched from the tri-border region into the Central Highlands, seized a complex of ARVN outposts near Dak To and then advanced toward Kon Tum, threatening to split South Vietnam in two.

The U.S. countered with a buildup of American airpower to support ARVN defensive operations and to conduct Operation Linebacker, the first offensive bombing of North Vietnam since Rolling Thunder had been terminated in 1968. The PAVN attacks against Huế, An Lộc, and Kon Tum were contained and the ARVN launched a counteroffensive in May to retake the lost northern provinces. On September 10, the South Vietnamese flag once again flew over the ruins of the Citadel of Quảng Trị, but the ARVN offensive then ran out of steam, conceding the rest of the occupied territory to the North Vietnamese. South Vietnam had countered the heaviest attack since Tet, but it was very evident that it was totally dependent on U.S. airpower for its survival. Meanwhile, the withdrawal of American troops, who numbered less than 100,000 at the beginning of the year, was continued as scheduled. By June only six infantry battalions remained. On August 12, the last American ground combat division left the country. However, the U.S. continued to operate the Long Binh Post. Combat patrols continued there until November 11 when the U.S. handed over the base to the South Vietnamese. After this, only 24,000 American troops remained in Vietnam and Nixon announced that they would stay there until all U.S. POW's were freed.

At the beginning of the North Vietnamese invasion, the media, including conservative commentator William F. Buckley, predicted the downfall of South Vietnam; Buckley even called for the firing of Abrams as an incompetent military leader, but the ARVN succeeded in defeating the PAVN. PAVN losses and subsequent retreat was viewed as so great a failure by the North Vietnamese Communist Party that Giap was relieved of his command. The 1973 withdrawal of U.S. military support and passage of Congressional resolutions cutting off U.S. funding for combat activities in Indochina (H.R. 9055 and H.J.Res. 636) opened the way for the 1975 defeat of the Republic of Vietnam.

=== Election of 1972 and Operation Linebacker II ===
During the run-up to the 1972 presidential election, the war was once again a major issue. An antiwar Democrat, George McGovern, ran against Nixon. The president ended Operation Linebacker on October 22 after the negotiating deadlock was broken and a tentative agreement had been hammered out by U.S. and North Vietnamese representatives at the peace negotiations in Paris. The head of the U.S. negotiating team, Henry Kissinger, declared that "peace is at hand" shortly before election day, dealing a death blow to McGovern's already doomed campaign. Kissinger had not, however, counted on the intransigence of South Vietnamese President Thieu, who refused to accept the agreement and demanded some 90 changes in its text. These the North Vietnamese refused to accept, and Nixon was not inclined to put too much pressure on Thieu just before the election, even though his victory was all but assured. The mood between the U.S. and North further turned sour when Hanoi went public with the details of the agreement. The Nixon Administration claimed that North Vietnamese negotiators had used the pronouncement as an opportunity to embarrass the President and to weaken the United States. White House Press Secretary Ron Ziegler told the press on November 30 that there would be no more public announcements concerning U.S. troop withdrawals from Vietnam since force levels were down to 27,000.

Because of Thieu's unhappiness with the agreement, primarily the stipulation that North Vietnamese troops could remain "in place" on South Vietnamese soil, the negotiations in Paris stalled as Hanoi refused to accept Thieu's changes and retaliated with amendments of its own. To reassure Thieu of American resolve, Nixon ordered a massive bombing campaign against North Vietnam utilizing B-52s and tactical aircraft in Operation Linebacker II, which began on December 18 with large raids against both Hanoi and the port of Haiphong. Nixon justified his actions by blaming the impasse in negotiations on the North Vietnamese. Although this heavy bombing campaign caused protests, both domestically and internationally, and despite significant aircraft losses over North Vietnam, Nixon continued the operation until December 29. He also exerted pressure on Thieu to accept the terms of the agreement reached in October.

=== Return to Paris ===
On January 15, 1973, citing progress in peace negotiations, Nixon announced the suspension of all offensive actions against North Vietnam, to be followed by a unilateral withdrawal of all U.S. troops. The Paris Peace Accords on "Ending the War and Restoring Peace in Vietnam" were signed on January 27, officially ending direct U.S. involvement in the Vietnam War.

The agreement called for the withdrawal of all U.S. personnel and an exchange of prisoners of war. Within South Vietnam, a cease-fire was declared (to be overseen by a multi-national, 1,160-man International Commission of Control and Supervision force) and both ARVN and PAVN/VC forces would remain in control of the areas they then occupied, effectively partitioning South Vietnam. Both sides pledged to work toward a compromise political solution, possibly resulting in a coalition government. To maximize the area under their control, both sides in South Vietnam almost immediately engaged in land-grabbing military operations, which turned into flashpoints. The signing of the Accords was the main motivation for the awarding of the 1973 Nobel Peace Prize to Henry Kissinger and to leading North Vietnamese negotiator Le Duc Tho. A separate cease-fire had been installed in Laos in February. Five days before the signing of the agreement in Paris, Johnson, whose presidency had been tainted with the Vietnam issue, died.

The first U.S. prisoners of war were released by North Vietnam on February 11, and all U.S. military personnel were to leave South Vietnam by March 29. As an inducement for Thieu's government to sign the agreement, Nixon had promised that the U.S. would provide financial and limited military support (in the form of air strikes) so that the South would not be overrun. But Nixon was fighting for his political life in the growing Watergate scandal and facing an increasingly hostile Congress that withheld funding. Nixon was able to exert little influence on a hostile public long sick of the Vietnam War. Thus, Nixon (or his successor Gerald Ford) was unable to fulfill his promises to Thieu. At the same time, aid to North Vietnam from the Soviet Union increased. With the U.S. no longer heavily involved, both the U.S. and the Soviet Union no longer saw the war as significant to their relations. The balance of power shifted decisively in North Vietnam's favor.

=== End of the war ===
In mid-December 1974 the North attacked Phước Long, when this didn't provoke U.S. retaliation, the North decided to launch a final, decisive attack on the South, the 1975 spring offensive, which began on March 10, 1975. South Vietnamese forces often disintegrated in the face of PAVN attacks and major cities fell with little resistance. Meanwhile, in Cambodia, the situation deteriorated further with the U.S. evacuating its citizens on April 12 and Phnom Penh fell to the Khmer Rouge on April 17. In late April, US military forces mounted Operation Frequent Wind to evacuate U.S. citizens and at-risk South Vietnamese from Saigon. The PAVN captured Saigon on April 30, 1975, ending the war.

== Views on the war ==
In the post-war era, Americans struggled to absorb the lessons of the military intervention. General Maxwell Taylor, one of the principal architects of the war, noted:

First, we didn't know ourselves. We thought that we were going into another Korean War, but this was a different country. Secondly, we didn't know our South Vietnamese allies ... And we knew less about North Vietnam. Who was Ho Chi Minh? Nobody really knew. So, until we know the enemy and know our allies and know ourselves, we'd better keep out of this kind of dirty business. It's very dangerous.

President Ronald Reagan coined the term "Vietnam Syndrome" to describe the reluctance of the American public and politicians to support further military interventions abroad after Vietnam. According to a 2004 Gallup poll, 62 percent of Americans believed it was an unjust war. US public polling in 1978 revealed that nearly 72% of Americans believed the war was "fundamentally wrong and immoral". Nearly a decade later, the number fell to 66%. In the past three decades, surveys have consistently shown that only around 35% of Americans believe that the war was fundamentally wrong and immoral. When surveyed in 2000, one third of Americans believed that the war was a noble cause.

Failure of the war is often placed at different institutions and levels. Some have suggested that the failure of the war was due to political failures of U.S. leadership. In 1965, U.S. diplomat George Ball wrote to President Lyndon Johnson explaining that the South Vietnamese were losing the war, facing the United States with a decision between limiting U.S. liabilities by finding a way out at minimal long-term costs or, alternatively, accepting an open-ended commitment of U.S. forces:

The decision you face now is crucial. Once large numbers of U.S. troops are committed to direct combat, they will begin to take heavy casualties in a war they are ill equipped to fight in a noncooperative if not downright hostile countryside. Once we suffer large casualties, we will have started a well-nigh irreversible process. Our involvement will be so great that we cannot—without national humiliation—stop short of achieving our complete objectives. Of the two possibilities, I think humiliation would be more likely than the achievement of our objectives—even after we have paid terrible costs.

The official history of the United States Army noted that "tactics have often seemed to exist apart from larger issues, strategies, and objectives. Yet in Vietnam the Army experienced tactical success and strategic failure ... success rests not only on military progress but on correctly analysing the nature of the particular conflict, understanding the enemy's strategy, and assessing the strengths and weaknesses of allies. A new humility and a new sophistication may form the best parts of a complex heritage left to the Army by the long, bitter war in Vietnam."

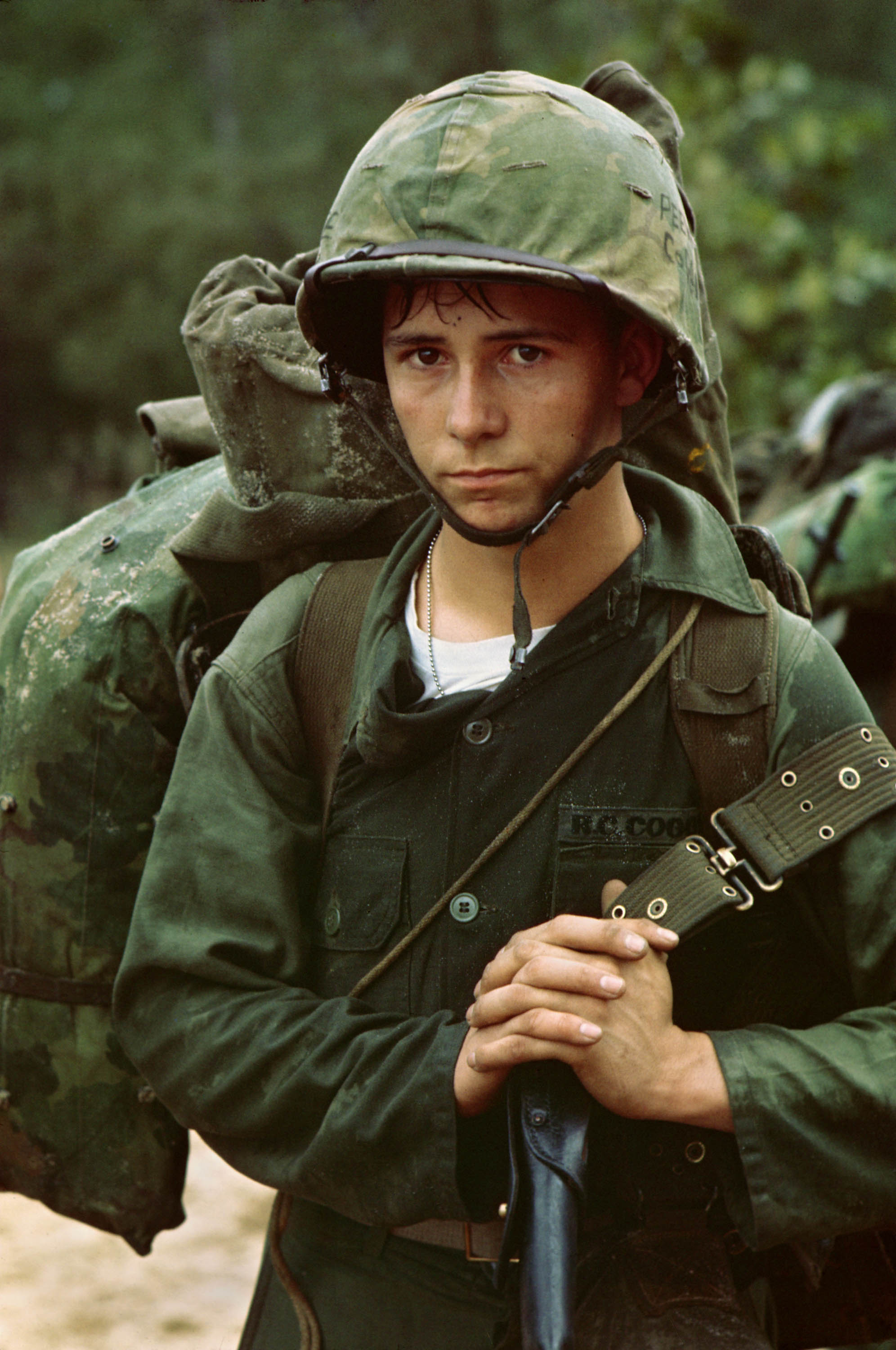
A young Marine private waits on the beach during the Marine landing, Da Nang, 3 August 1965

Others point to a failure of U.S. military doctrine. McNamara stated that "the achievement of a military victory by U.S. forces in Vietnam was indeed a dangerous illusion." The inability to bring Hanoi to the bargaining table by bombing also illustrated another U.S. miscalculation, and demonstrated the limitations of U.S. military abilities in achieving political goals. As Army Chief of Staff Harold Keith Johnson noted, "if anything came out of Vietnam, it was that air power couldn't do the job." Even Westmoreland admitted that the bombing had been ineffective. As he remarked, "I still doubt that the North Vietnamese would have relented." U.S. Secretary of State Henry Kissinger wrote in a secret memo to President Gerald Ford that "in terms of military tactics, we cannot help draw the conclusion that our armed forces are not suited to this kind of war. Even the Special Forces who had been designed for it could not prevail."

Hanoi had persistently sought unification of the country since the Geneva Accords, and the effects of U.S. bombings had negligible impact on the goals of the North Vietnamese government. The effects of U.S. bombing campaigns had mobilised the people throughout North Vietnam and mobilised international support for North Vietnam due to the perception of a super-power attempting to bomb a significantly smaller, agrarian society into submission.

The Vietnam War POW/MIA issue, concerning the fate of U.S. service personnel listed as missing in action, persisted for many years after the war's conclusion. The costs of the war loom large in American popular consciousness; a 1990 poll showed that the public incorrectly believed that more Americans lost their lives in Vietnam than in World War II.

=== U.S. civil rights leaders' opposition to U.S. involvement ===
In the earlier stages of his career as a prominent civil rights activist, Martin Luther King Jr. focused largely on addressing issues pertaining to racial segregation and unfair treatment of black people. However, in the later stages, he extended his activism to addressing large-scale issues such as his opposition and condemnation of the war. In 1967, King addressed the issues in his speech titled "Beyond Vietnam: A Time to Break Silence". Although King was initially hesitant to speak about the U.S. government's decision to go to war with Vietnam, he would condemn them and their actions in his speech. Delivered in the heart of New York City, King gave his many reasons as to why the war was an irrational decision, noting how it had moral and ethical implications. King correspondingly touched on how the escalating violence was very destructive and had infinite consequences on the Vietnamese people. In the speech, King also expressed how the war had broader implications for America's moral standing in the world.

Malcolm X was a prominent spokesperson for the black community in America but also did not fear speaking out against larger issues such as the war. In 1964, Malcolm X gave his infamous speech titled "The Ballot or the Bullet", where he condemned the war and labeled the United States as hypocrites. In the speech, he declared his philosophy of black nationalism and used the war as an example of how his country and government continue to make irrational decisions. Malcolm X said that his own country has failed him and his people, as the black community still struggled for equal rights yet is being shipped abroad to go to war in places like Korea and Southern Vietnam. He noted how he was a victim of America's so-called democracy, and calls the white people in attendance his "enemies". He noted how the United States was fighting for international freedom in Vietnam, yet was still denying full rights and equality to African Americans at home, labeling them as hypocrites.

== Financial cost ==
United States expenditures in South Vietnam (SVN) (1953–1974) Direct costs only. Some estimates are higher.
U.S. military costs	U.S. military aid to SVN	U.S. economic aid to SVN	Total	Total (2015 dollars)
$111 billion	$16.138 billion	$7.315 billion	$134.53 billion	$1.020 trillion

Between 1953 and 1975, the United States was estimated to have spent $168 billion on the war (equivalent to $1.74 trillion in 2025). This resulted in a large federal budget deficit. Other figures point to $138.9 billion from 1965 to 1974 (not inflation-adjusted), 10 times all education spending in the US and 50 times more than housing and community development spending within that time period. General record-keeping was reported to have been sloppy for government spending during the war. It was stated that war-spending could have paid off every mortgage in the US at that time, with money leftover.

More than 3 million Americans served in the Vietnam War, some 1.5 million of whom actually saw combat in Vietnam. James E. Westheider wrote that "At the height of American involvement in 1968, for example, 543,000 American military personnel were stationed in Vietnam, but only 80,000 were considered combat troops." Conscription in the United States had been controlled by the president since World War II, and men were drafted every year except 1947 until it was ended in 1973. 1,857,304 people were conscripted into military service from August 1964 to February 1973.

As of 2013, the U.S. government is paying Vietnam veterans and their families or survivors more than $22 billion a year in war-related claims.

== Impact on the U.S. military ==
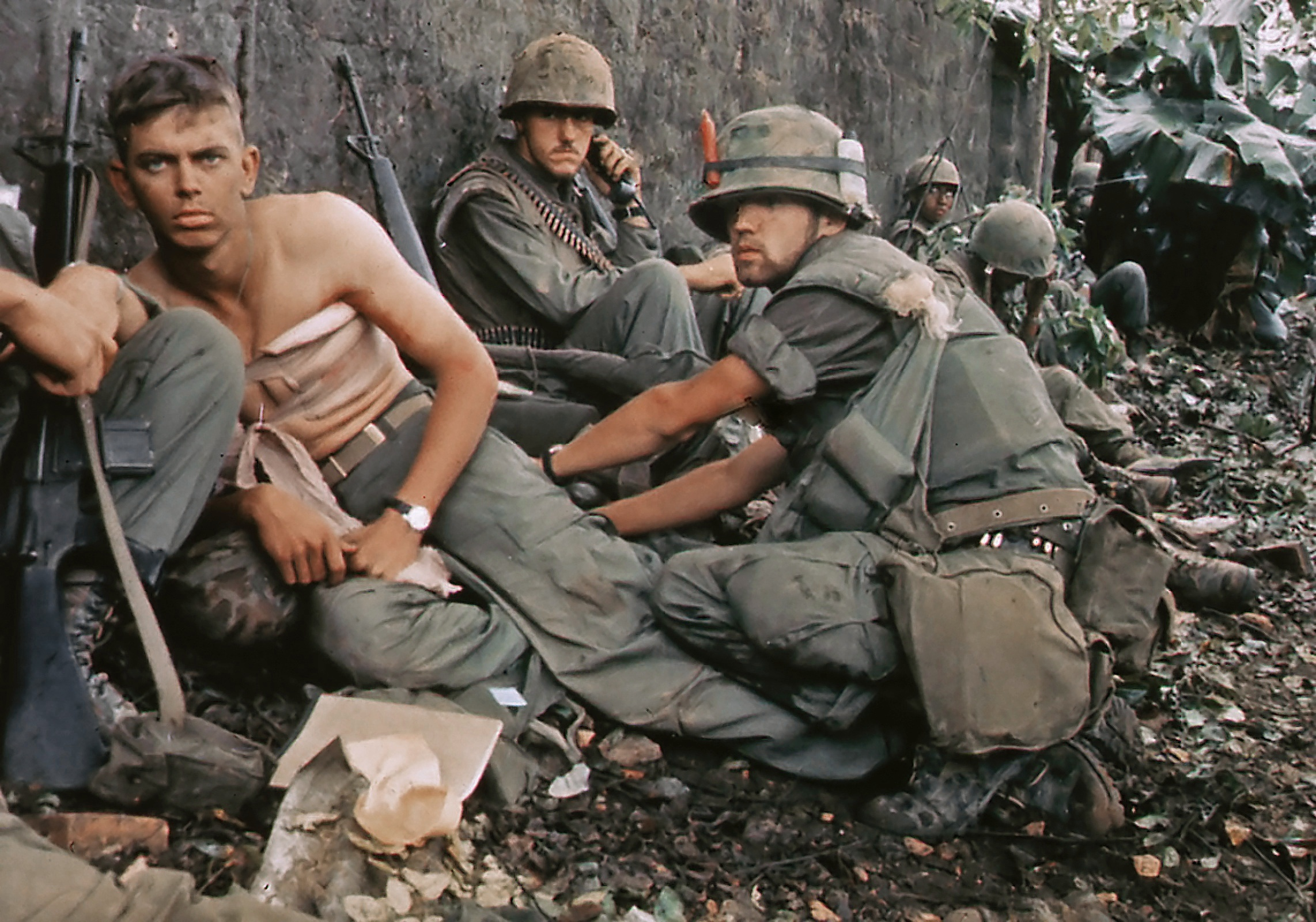
A marine gets his wounds treated during operations in Huế City, February 1968

By the war's end, 58,220 American soldiers had been killed, more than 150,000 had been wounded, and at least 21,000 had been permanently disabled. The average age of the U.S. troops killed in Vietnam was 23.11 years. According to Dale Kueter, "Of those killed in combat, 86.3 percent were white, 12.5 percent were black and the remainder from other races." Approximately 830,000 Vietnam veterans suffered some degree of post traumatic stress disorder (PTSD). Vietnam veterans suffered from PTSD in unprecedented numbers, as many as 15.2% of Vietnam veterans, because the U.S. military had routinely provided heavy psychoactive drugs, including amphetamines, to American servicemen, which left them unable to process adequately their traumas at the time. An estimated 125,000 Americans left for Canada to avoid the Vietnam draft, and approximately 50,000 American servicemen deserted. On January 21, 1977, United States president Jimmy Carter, a day after his assuming office, granted a full and unconditional pardon to all Vietnam-era draft dodgers (but not deserters who were on active duty) with Proclamation 4483.

As the war continued inconclusively and became more unpopular with the American public, morale declined and disciplinary problems grew among American enlisted men and junior, non-career officers. Drug use, racial tensions, and the growing incidence of fragging—attempting to kill unpopular officers and non-commissioned officers with grenades or other weapons—created severe problems for the U.S. military and impacted its capability of undertaking combat operations. By 1971, a U.S. Army colonel writing in the Armed Forces Journal declared:

By every conceivable indicator, our army that now remains in Vietnam is in a state approaching collapse, with individual units avoiding or having refused combat, murdering their officers and non commissioned officers, drug-ridden, and dispirited where not near mutinous ....The morale, discipline, and battle-worthiness of the U.S. Armed Forces are, with a few salient exceptions, lower and worse than at any time in this century and possibly in the history of the United States.

Between 1969 and 1971 the U.S. Army recorded more than 900 attacks by troops on their own officers and NCOs with 99 killed.

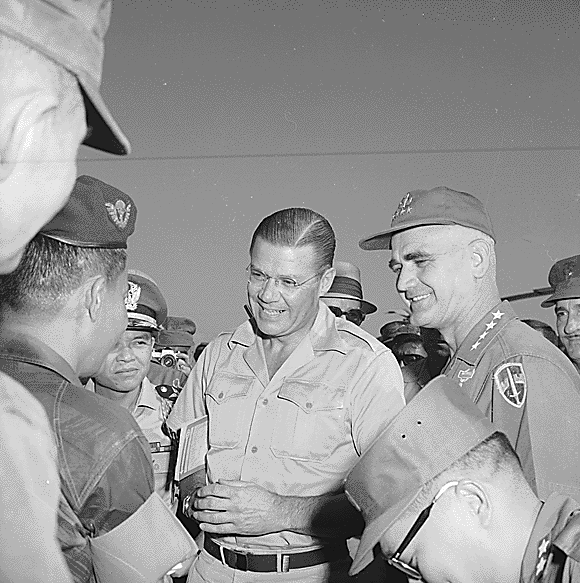
Secretary of Defense Robert McNamara and General Westmoreland talk with General Tee on conditions of the war in Vietnam.

The war called into question the U.S. Army doctrine. Marine Corps general Victor H. Krulak heavily criticised Westmoreland's attrition strategy, calling it "wasteful of American lives ... with small likelihood of a successful outcome." In addition, doubts surfaced about the ability of the military to train foreign forces. Furthermore, throughout the war there was found to be considerable flaws and dishonesty by officers and commanders due to promotions being tied to the body count system touted by Westmoreland and McNamara. Behind the scenes McNamara wrote in a memo to Johnson his doubts about the war: "The picture of the world's greatest superpower killing or seriously injuring 1,000 noncombatants a week, while trying to pound a tiny backward nation into submission on an issue whose merits are hotly disputed, is not a pretty one."

Ron Milam has questioned the severity of the "breakdown" of the U.S. armed forces, especially among combat troops, as reflecting the opinions of "angry colonels" who deplored the erosion of traditional military values during the Vietnam War. Although acknowledging serious problems, he questions the alleged "near mutinous" conduct of junior officers and enlisted men in combat. Investigating one combat refusal incident, a journalist declared, "A certain sense of independence, a reluctance to behave according to the military's insistence on obedience, like pawns or puppets ... The grunts [infantrymen] were determined to survive ... they insisted of having something to say about the making of decisions that determined whether they might live or die." The morale and discipline problems and resistance to conscription were important factors leading to the creation of an all-volunteer military force by the United States and the termination of conscription. The last conscript was inducted into the army in 1973. The all-volunteer military moderated some of the coercive methods of discipline previously used to maintain order in military ranks.

=== Drug usage ===
The earliest reported use of drugs among US troops in Vietnam was recorded in 1963. During this time the most commonly used drug was marijuana, which was sometimes used in the form of hashish. Soldiers mainly used the drug during downtime in rear areas and commanders expressed concern that it would hinder combat operations. Heroin consumption was also common among US troops and, according to historians such as Robins, was a large problem as an estimated 34% of servicemen consumed it at least once.

Towards the end of US involvement in Vietnam, heroin use spiked. Morale dropped toward the end of US involvement due to lack of support at home, and a feeling that the war was purposeless. Troops used heroin and other drugs to pass time, and to deal with the mental stresses of combat, boredom, and feelings of hopelessness. Robert Steele and Morgan Murphy toured Vietnam in 1971 and discovered that 15% of the US military said they were addicted to heroin.

The military had launched education programs to deal with the growing drug abuse problem among the troops. When it failed, the military began to court martial offenders in large numbers. When the number of courts-martial became too high, the military began to discharge troops from the service. The Marines especially believed in punishment to curb drug use. The Marine Commandant at the time, believed it was better for its strength to diminish than to allow heroin-addicted Marines to continue to serve. This method was effective at preventing new troops from becoming users because new troops had become users due to existing troops introducing them to the drugs.

== See also ==
- Vietnam War casualties
- Phoenix Program
- Tiger Force
- Opposition to United States involvement in the Vietnam War
  - Vietnam Veterans Against the War
  - Winter Soldier Investigation
- Canada and the Vietnam War
- Military history of the United States
- Viet Cong Motivation and Morale Project
- United States Air Force in Thailand
- Weapons of the Vietnam War
- Aircraft losses of the Vietnam War
- Prisoner-of-war camp
- Military Assistance Command, Vietnam Studies and Observations Group
- United States news media and the Vietnam War
- List of congressional opponents of the Vietnam War
- United States assistance to Vietnam
- United States–Vietnam relations

== Sources ==
- Demma, Vincent H. (1989). "The U.S. Army in Vietnam". American Military History. Washington, DC: US Army Center of Military History. pp. 619–694. Archived from the original on January 20, 2020.
- Karnow, Stanley (1997). Vietnam: A History (2nd ed.). New York: Penguin Books. ISBN 978-0-14-026547-7.
- Kissinger (1975). "Lessons of Vietnam" by Secretary of State Henry Kissinger, ca. May 12, 1975 (memo). Archived from the original on May 9, 2008.
- Oldmeadow, Harry (2004), Journeys East: 20th Century Western Encounters with Eastern Religious Traditions, World Wisdom, Inc, ISBN 0-941532-57-7
- Rotter, Andrew (1999). Light at the End of the Tunnel: A Vietnam War Anthology. Rowman & Littlefield. ISBN 9780842027137.
- Turner, Robert F. (1975). Vietnamese Communism: Its Origins and Development. Stanford: Hoover Institution Publications. ISBN 978-0-8179-1431-8.
- Westheider, James E. (2007). The Vietnam War. Westport, Connecticut: Greenwood Press. ISBN 978-0-313-33755-0.
