= United States assistance to Vietnam =

United States assistance to Vietnam refers to the range of economic, military, humanitarian, and development aid provided by the United States to Vietnam, spanning from early Cold War support to the State of Vietnam (via France) and later South Vietnam, through decades of hostility and embargo, to contemporary cooperation on war legacy issues and public health. Initial U.S. assistance began in the 1950s with military aid to the French Union and later expanded to support the government of South Vietnam during the Vietnam War. Following the fall of Saigon in 1975, the United States imposed a comprehensive embargo on Vietnam, halting all bilateral aid for nearly two decades.

The resumption of U.S. assistance in the early 1990s was closely tied to Vietnam's cooperation on issues such as prisoner of war and missing in action (POW/MIA) accounting, demining, and addressing the health and environmental impacts of war. Since then, the United States has become a leading donor for unexploded ordnance (UXO) clearance and remediation efforts, contributing over US$250,000,000 since 1993, and has expanded aid to include health, food security, and HIV/AIDS prevention. Today, U.S. assistance programs support Vietnam's economic development, public health, and efforts to address the long-term consequences of war.

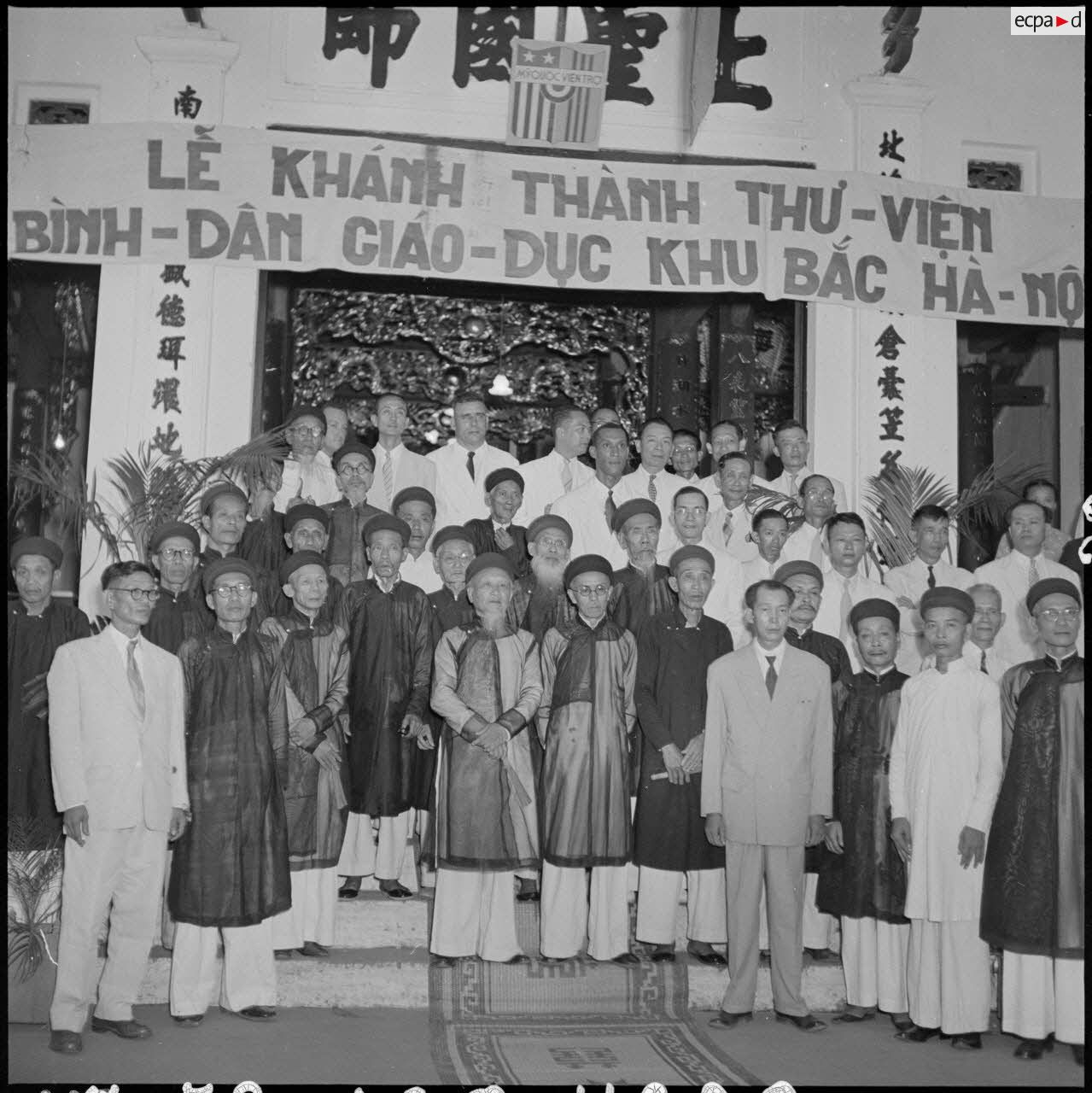
Members of the Popular Education Committee on the day of the student award ceremony, aided by the US, Hanoi 1952.

== Overview of the U.S. Aid Program in Vietnam ==
U.S.-Vietnam diplomatic and economic relations were non-existent for more than fifteen years following socialist North Vietnam's victory in 1975 over U.S. ally South Vietnam. During that time, the United States maintained restrictions on foreign assistance to unified Vietnam.

Normalization of relations—particularly in the economic sphere—began hesitantly in the early 1990s, progressed incrementally through the mid- and late 1990s, and then accelerated markedly following the signing of a Bilateral Trade Agreement (BTA) in 2000. One measure of the pace of the normalization of bilateral economic relations is the increase in trade flows, which rose from about $200 million in 1994 to over $1 billion in 2000, to nearly $4.5 billion in 2003. The United States is now Vietnam's largest trading partner.

The resumption of U.S. aid to Vietnam has closely tracked the normalization of bilateral relations. U.S. assistance began as a trickle in 1991, when around $1 million was spent for prosthetics for Vietnamese war victims, and increased to nearly $50 million in fiscal year (FY) 2004 covering a broad range of programs. Moreover, the level of assistance has more than doubled since FY2000. (See Table 1) For FY2005 through the end of April 2005, nearly $55 million in assistance had been spent.

By far the two largest components of the U.S. bilateral aid program are food assistance and health-related assistance, which together comprised about 60% of the nearly $200 million in aid the United States has provided to Vietnam since U.S. assistance began to increase substantially in FY1999. Spending on HIV/AIDS treatment and prevention in Vietnam has risen, especially since President Bush's June 2004 designation of Vietnam as a "focus country" eligible to receive increased funding to combat HIV-AIDS under PEPFAR. The United States provided $10 million in PEPFAR funds in FY2004, and over $27 million for FY2005 through the end of April.

Since mid-December 2004, Vietnam has reported over 30 cases, at least 14 of them fatal, of the H5 avian influenza (also known as the "bird flu"), raising concerns that the disease is re-emerging after an outbreak in early 2004 spread across Asia. The wartime and tsunami supplemental, H.R. 1268, which was passed by the House on May 5 and the Senate on May 10, 2005, includes $25 million to help combat the disease, of which the U.S. embassy in Hanoi expects approximately $4 million to be used in Vietnam.

Other sizeable assistance items include demining activities and programs assisting Vietnam's economic reform efforts. This latter group of programs has been designed to help the Vietnamese government implement the economic liberalization reforms it committed to in the 2000 U.S.-Vietnam Bilateral Trade Agreement and will likely be required to undertake as part of its desire to join the World Trade Organization (WTO).2 Hanoi has set a goal of attaining WTO membership by the end of 2005. The U.S. also funds educational exchanges with Vietnam, principally the Vietnam Fulbright program, which receives more funding (typically $4 million annually) than any other Fulbright program in the world. These programs are not included in Table 1 because they are not funded through the foreign policy budget and confer benefits to both the U.S. and Vietnam. Additionally, the United States administers the Vietnam Education Foundation, which was established by Congress in 2000 to provide $5 million annually for scholarships and educational exchanges. Funds for the foundation are recycled from the Vietnamese government's repayments of the wartime debts South Vietnam owed the United States. Total annual funding for educational exchanges, including the Fulbright and Vietnam Education Foundation programs, has been in the $9–$11 million range since FY2003.

== Vietnam and the Millennium Challenge Account ==
In May 2004, Vietnam was not selected as one of the first 16 countries eligible for the Millennium Challenge Account (MCA). Vietnam was deemed ineligible, despite meeting the technical requirements for MCA eligibility, because it scored very low on some of the indicators used to measure political freedom. Vietnam again was included in the list of candidate countries for FY2005, from which eligible countries will be selected in late 2004. In September 2004, Vietnam again received low scores on the indicators of political and civil liberties maintained used by the Millennium Challenge Corporation to determine eligibility for the MCA.

Relative to other countries in Southeast Asia, Vietnam receives far less than Indonesia and the Philippines, front-line states in the war on terrorism that received an estimated $150 million and $110 million in FY2004, respectively. Assistance to Vietnam is roughly on a par with the next two largest Southeast Asian recipients of U.S. aid, Cambodia ($50 million) and East Timor ($30 million). Relative to the rest of the world, Southeast Asia is not a target for large U.S. aid programs, in part because many countries in the region have "graduated" from economic aid.

== Future Areas for Possible Expansion ==
If U.S.-Vietnam relations continue to deepen, particularly in the political and military spheres, it is possible to foresee a continued expansion of the U.S. aid program in Vietnam. Possible areas for new or expanded programs include strengthening the rule of law (particularly judicial capacity building), counternarcotics, anti-corruption, education management, and the preservation of cultural and historical sites. On top of these items, two new programs currently are being considered for Vietnam:

=== IMET (International Military Education and Training) ===
Vietnam and the United States gradually have been expanding their embryonic security ties, which have lagged far behind the economic aspect of the relationship. Some in the United States see Vietnamese and U.S. security interests as mutually reinforcing, particularly with regard to China, and hope to develop military-to-military relations. These efforts culminated in November 2003, when Vietnamese Defense Minister Pham Van Tra visited Washington. Later that month, the guided missile frigate USS Vandergrift and its 200 crew members made a four-day call at the port of Saigon. Both events were firsts since the end of the Vietnam War and were followed up by additional visits in 2004. One option for expanding military-to-military relations would be establishing a bilateral IMET program. Since FY2002, the Bush Administration has requested funds for Expanded International Military Education and Training (E-IMET) courses to enhance English language proficiency among Vietnamese military officers. The program is designed to "facilitate [the officers'] attendance at conferences and confidence building meetings hosted by Pacific Command Headquarters." No funds have been disbursed, however, because Vietnam and the United States have not yet signed an IMET agreement. Funding for IMET programs would be affected by the restrictions in the proposed Vietnam Human Rights Act.

In an interview with the Washington Post days before departing for his June 21, 2005 summit with President Bush, Vietnamese Prime Minister Pham Van Khai said that during his trip to Washington, the United States and Vietnam would announce the launch of a bilateral IMET program.

=== Peace Corps ===
The Vietnamese government in early 2004 invited the U.S. Peace Corps to Vietnam to begin discussion of opening a country program. Over 20 countries, including Cambodia, have made similar invitations. The Peace Corps has welcomed the invitation and in the near future intends to conduct a country assessment. Generally, if a country assessment team makes a positive report, it takes 12 to 18 months for a program to be established. New programs typically cost on the order of $1 million-$2 million annually. In its report (S.Rept. 108–346) accompanying the FY2005 Foreign Operations bill (S. 2812), the Senate Appropriations Committee expressed its support for opening a new program in Vietnam. The Vietnam Human Rights Act's restrictions would not have directly affected the Peace Corps.

=== Agent Orange ===
Prime Minister Pham Van Khai indicated that one of his mid- level priorities during his trip to the United States in June 2005 is obtaining U.S. assistance for Agent Orange victims. During President Bill Clinton's five-day trip to Vietnam in 2000, the United States agreed to set up a joint research study on the effects of dioxin/Agent Orange. Over three million Vietnamese suffering from the alleged effects of Agent Orange were part of a class action suit filed in U.S. Federal District Court in Brooklyn against the chemical companies that manufactured the defoliant. The case was dismissed in March 2005, in a ruling that was widely publicized in Vietnam. In April 2005, the Bush Administration discontinued funding of a grant to conduct research in Vietnam on the possible relationship between Agent Orange and birth defects. The justification for the decision was that the Vietnamese Ministry of Health had not given its approval for the study.

== Recent Attempts to Restrict Aid ==
In recent years, Congress has devoted considerable attention to Vietnam's human rights record. Vietnam is a one-party, authoritarian state. Since at least the late 1990s, the ruling Vietnamese Communist Party (VCP) appears to have followed a strategy of relaxing most restrictions on most forms of personal and religious expression while selectively repressing individuals and organizations that it deems a threat to the party's monopoly on political power. Most prominently, the government has cracked down harshly on protests against various government policies by certain ethnic minority groups, particularly the Montagnards in the country's Central Highlands and the Hmong in the Northwest Highlands. The government also has stepped up repression of so-called cyber dissidents who have criticized the government over the Internet. On September 15, 2004, the State Department, under the International Religious Freedom Act (P.L. 105–292), for the first time designated Vietnam as a "country of particular concern," principally because of reports of worsening harassment of certain groups of ethnic minority Protestants and Buddhists. By law, within 90 days (extendable for another 90-day period), the President must decide on a course of action, including sanctions, with regard to Vietnam's religious rights situation. The President extended the review period, meaning that a decision must be made by mid-March 2005.

== A Review of the U.S.-Vietnam Normalization Process and the Restoration of U.S. Aid to Vietnam ==
Congress played a key role in both the cessation of aid to Vietnam in the 1970s, and its restoration in the 1990s.

=== Cold War Restrictions on Aid ===
For much of the Cold War, aid to North Vietnam and most other socialist countries was prohibited. (Aid was prohibited under section 620(f) of the Foreign Assistance Act of 1961, among other statutes.) The United States provided significant military and economic assistance to its ally, South Vietnam, particularly after the U.S. became overtly involved in inter-Vietnamese hostilities in 1965. In 1973, following the conclusion of a Paris Peace Agreement that brought an end to U.S. military involvement in Vietnam, Congress began cutting Nixon Administration requests for military and economic assistance to South Vietnam. President Richard Nixon's pledge to provide reconstruction aid to North Vietnam also proved unpopular in Congress, particularly after the collapse of the north–south cease-fire negotiated in Paris.

After the victory of socialist North Vietnam over South Vietnam in April 1975, the United States ended virtually all bilateral economic interchange, including foreign assistance, with unified Vietnam. (Prohibitions on assistance to Vietnam were included in P.L. 94–41, a continuing appropriations resolution signed into law by President Gerald Ford in the summer of 1975.) The restrictions included a halt to bilateral humanitarian aid, opposition to financial aid from international financial institutions (such as the World Bank), a ban on U.S. travel to Vietnam, and an embargo on bilateral trade. President Gerald Ford linked the provision of economic assistance to Hanoi's cooperation in returning and accounting for POWs and MIAs. In the FY1977 foreign aid appropriations bill Congress prohibited the use of any funds to provide assistance to Vietnam, a provision that was repeated annually until its removal in 1994.

In the early months of his administration, President Jimmy Carter (1977–1981) and the socialist regime in Hanoi attempted to negotiate the outlines of a normalization agreement that would include U.S. assistance. The negotiations stalled, however, when the Vietnamese responded that they would neither agree to establish relations nor furnish information on U.S. POW/MIAs until the United States pledged to provide several billion dollars in postwar reconstruction aid. Simultaneously, Congress objected to Carter's moves by reinforcing existing prohibitions on aid to Vietnam. Normalization efforts ultimately were thwarted in 1978 by Vietnam's decision to align with the Soviet Union, its invasion of Cambodia, and its expulsion of nearly half a million ethnic Chinese who then became refugees in Southeast Asia.

=== The Normalization Process since the Early 1990s ===
Washington and Hanoi gradually began to normalize relations in the early 1990s, following Vietnam's withdrawal from Cambodia and improvements in Hanoi's cooperation on the issue of American prisoners of war (POWs) and missing-in-action (MIA) personnel in Vietnam. Economic assistance was resumed in 1991, when the administration of George H. W. Bush announced plans to send $1.3 million to fit disabled Vietnamese with artificial limbs.19 The announcement came days after Washington and Hanoi agreed to open an office in Vietnam to resolve outstanding MIA cases. In subsequent years, annual aid flows were generally small and limited to disaster assistance and humanitarian programs—such as prosthetics and aid to orphans—to ameliorate the effects of the war.

Coinciding with these developments, in 1991 and 1992 the Senate Select Committee on POW/MIA affairs—chaired by John Kerry and vice-chaired by Bob Smith—conducted what many consider the most extensive independent investigation of the POW/MIA issue undertaken. In early 1993, the committee issued its report, which concluded that there was "no compelling evidence" that POWs were alive after the U.S. withdrawal from Vietnam, and that although there was no "conspiracy" in Washington to cover up live POWs, the U.S. government had seriously neglected and mismanaged the issue, particularly in the 1970s. The committee's televised hearings played a major role in defusing much of the passion that had surrounded the POW issue.

The U.S. aid program in Vietnam expanded gradually through the 1990s, in step with the acceleration of the normalization process. In 1993, President Bill Clinton announced that the United States would no longer oppose international financial institution aid to Vietnam. The following year, President Clinton ordered an end to the U.S. trade embargo on Vietnam, a move that followed shortly after a vote in the Senate urging the embargo to be lifted. Ambassadors were exchanged in 1997. In Title II of the FY1991 Foreign Operations bill (P.L. 101–513) provided these funds, notwithstanding other legal provisions, including the ban on bilateral aid to Vietnam.

1998, President Clinton granted Vietnam its first waiver from the requirements of the so-called Jackson–Vanik Amendment (contained in the Trade Act of 1974, Title IV, section 402), which prohibit the President from normalizing commercial relations with selected socialist and formerly socialist countries if they do not meet certain requirements regarding freedom of emigration. A congressional resolution disapproving the waiver was defeated, as have such resolutions disapproving the presidential waivers issued every year since.

All of these steps provoked considerable controversy in Congress, though opposition to normalization decreased incrementally throughout the 1990s. Following the signing of the BTA in 2000, Congress overwhelmingly approved the agreement, which paved the way for the two countries to extend normal trade relations (NTR) status on a nonpermanent basis to one another. The signing of the BTA marked the end to legal restrictions on virtually all commercial transactions and most forms of economic assistance to Vietnam. Also in 2000, the Clinton Administration, in an undated unpublished determination, on national interest grounds, exempted Vietnam from the prohibition on most forms of assistance to 'communist' countries contained in section 620(f) of the Foreign Assistance Act of 1961.

Vietnam and the United States gradually have been expanding their political and security ties, although these have lagged far behind the economic aspect of the relationship. In 2003 and 2004, however, Vietnam's leadership appears to have decided to expand their country's ties to the United States, as indicated by the aforementioned military-to-military meetings and ship visits. It is still unclear how far, how fast, and in what form any new security relationship will develop.
