= United States–Vietnam relations =

- United States: Vietnam

Diplomatic mission
- United States Embassy, Hanoi: Vietnamese Embassy, Washington, D.C.

Envoy
- Ambassador Jennifer Wicks McNamara: Ambassador Nguyễn Quốc Dũng

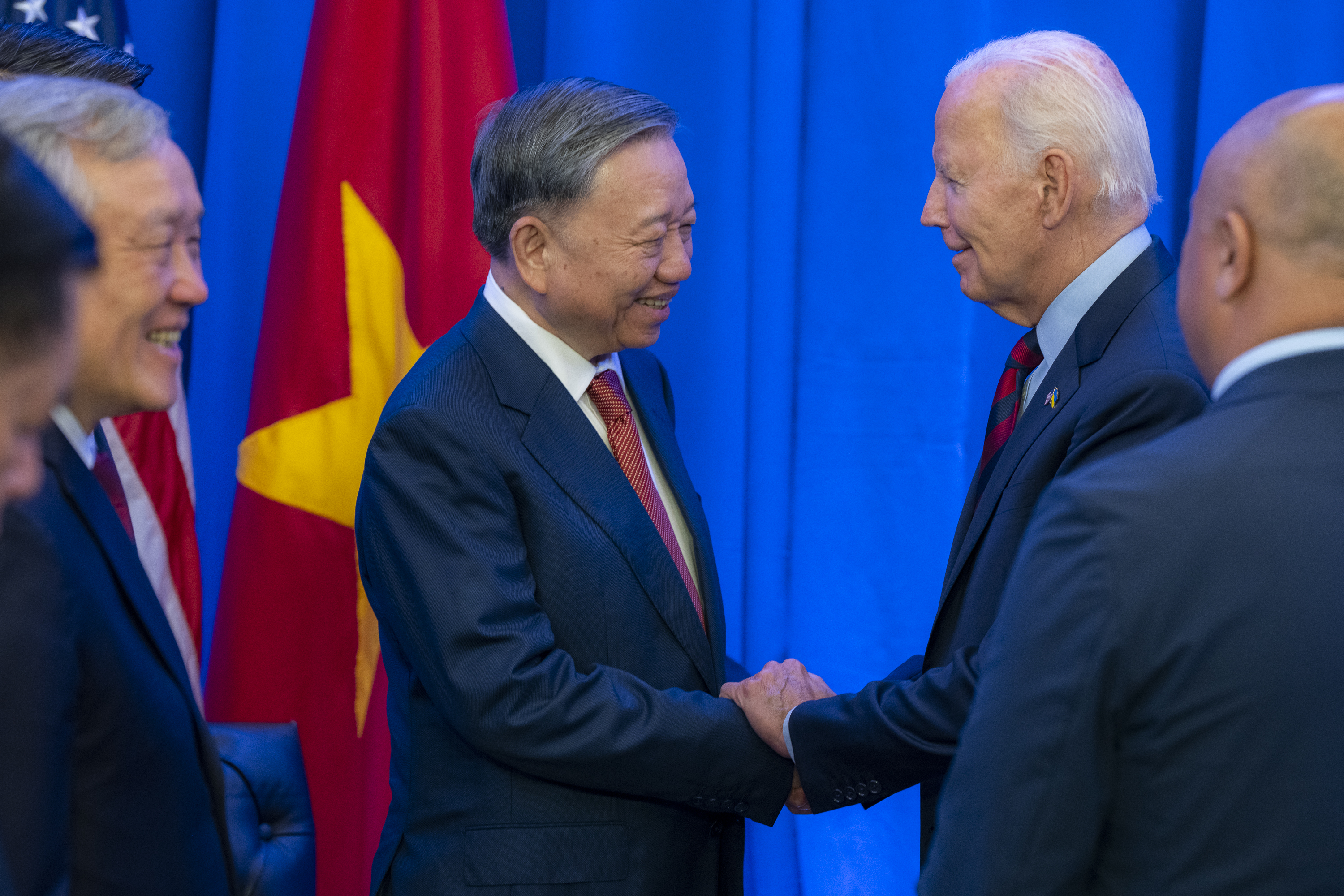
Meeting between President of the United States Joe Biden and the General Secretary and President of Vietnam Tô Lâm in 2024, being cited as a significant bilateral meeting between the two leaders.

Early contacts between the United States and Vietnam began around 1787, when US minister to France Thomas Jefferson met the exiled Vietnamese Prince Cảnh, son of the future Emperor Gia Long in Paris, as Jefferson showed interest in dry rice varieties from Cochinchina (South Vietnam).

In 1945, toward the end of World War II, the US Office of Strategic Services assisted the Viet Minh in gaining intelligence against the Japanese. With the emergence of the Cold War, the US supported the anticommunist, French-associated State of Vietnam against the communist-controlled Democratic Republic of Vietnam. After the dissolution of French Indochina in 1954, the US supported the anticommunist South Vietnam as opposed to communist North Vietnam and fought North Vietnam directly during the Vietnam War. After American withdrawal in 1973 and the subsequent fall of South Vietnam in 1975, the U.S. applied a trade embargo and severed ties with Vietnam, mostly out of concerns relating to Vietnamese boat people and the Vietnam War POW/MIA issue. Attempts at re-establishing relations went unfulfilled for decades, until U.S. president Bill Clinton began normalizing diplomatic relations in the 1990s. In 1994, the U.S. lifted its 30-year trade embargo on Vietnam, though other sanctions remained. While trade was allowed to flow, it was not on normal terms as Vietnamese exports to the U.S. still faced high tariffs in the range of 40%-80%. The following year, both countries established embassies and consulates. Relations between the two countries continued to improve into the 21st century.

Vietnam has pursued closer relations with the United States, especially in the geopolitical context of its territorial disputes with China in the South China Sea. However, it has also kept a balance between China and the United States. The Vietnamese public, unlike in other communist countries, has a favorable view of the U.S. Every U.S. president since diplomatic normalization in 1995 has visited Vietnam at least once, highlighting the importance of Vietnam in the U.S.'s growing pivot to Asia; these visits have been welcomed by the Vietnamese populace despite political differences.

Over 2.1 million Vietnamese Americans are largely immigrants who moved to the United States after the Vietnam War. They comprise nearly half of all overseas Vietnamese.

== History ==
=== 19th century ===
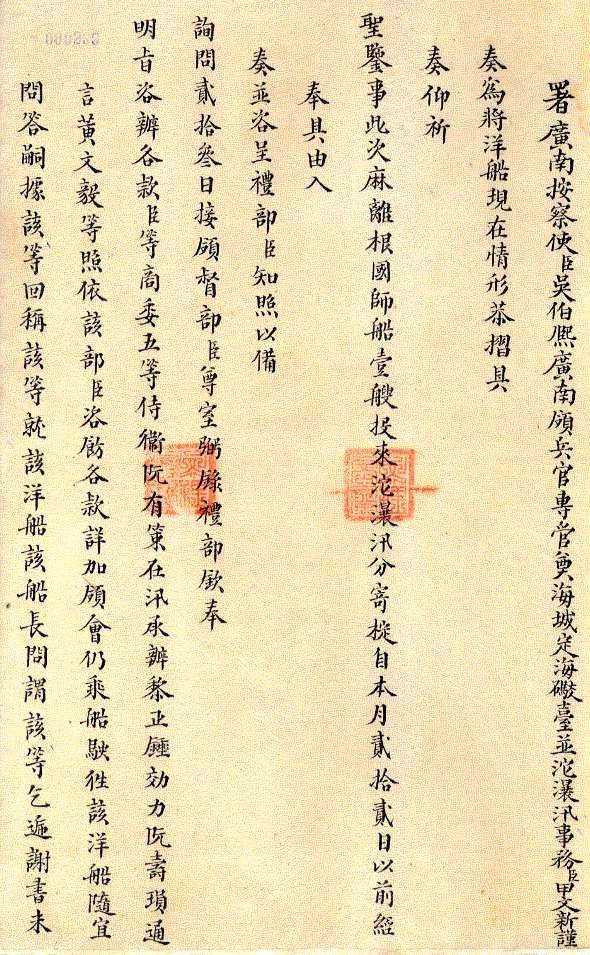
Letter of Quảng Nam Provincial Commissioner Ngô Bá Hy to Vietnamese emperor Tu Duc (r. 1848-1883) reporting on the arrival of USS Plymouth in Da Nang harbor, sent on March 9, 1850, Vietnamese State Archive. Content by translation: "The president of the Ma-ly-can country said that, four years ago (1845), a naval commander from his country came to our country and allowed his soldiers to go ashore and kill our people, but because his country is so distant, he only learned of it now. He has since punished that naval commander. That commander acted without proper restraint and thus harmed the friendship between the two countries. The president of that country originally did not wish to cling to old grievances and cut off all trade relations... Moreover, fourteen years earlier (1836), they had already sent an envoy named (Edmund Roberts) to discuss a treaty of friendship and commerce, but the matter was left unfinished. Now they have returned with desire to negotiate and settle it clearly, so the president has sent envoy Ba Ly Trì (Joseph Balestier) to apologize and renegotiate..."

The first American to visit Vietnam was Captain Jeremiah Briggs of The Fame, a commercial ship, set sail from Salem, Massachusetts and arrived at Huế on May 23, 1803. The second was US Navy Lieutenant John White, commanding the USS Franklin (1795) on a commercial trip to Vietnam. White arrived in Huế on June 12, 1819, but then proceeded to Manila after learning that the Emperor of Vietnam was absent from the city in Northern Vietnam. He and John Brown, Captain of the Marmion arrived at Saigon on October 9, 1819, and continued to stay at the city for another four months. He observed economy, political landscape, culture, and notably the rise of Minh Mạng and his anti-Western and anti-trade attitudes.

In 1829, U.S. president Andrew Jackson sent a diplomatic delegation led by Edmund Roberts on the USS Peacock to the Nguyễn dynasty to establish bilateral relations and expand trade between the two countries. The ship arrived in Vũng Lấm, Phú Yên province on 2 January 1833. The ruler of Vietnam at the time, Emperor Minh Mạng, was not eager to allow foreigners to freely enter Vietnam and engage in trade. The emperor required that Americans follow Vietnamese laws, and only allowed them to do business in Đà Nẵng, Central Vietnam. After receiving this unwelcome message, Edmund Roberts and his delegation left Vietnam. Vietnamese account for the US delegation arrival was brief:

Winter, 11th month. 13th year of Minh-Mang (January 1833): The President of the Republic Nha-di-ly, located on the Atlantic Ocean and known also by the names Hoa-Ky (花旗), Ma-ly-can (麻利堅, pronounced [ma li kɐn], America), Tan-anh-cat-ly (新英吉利 New England), sent his subjects Mr. Nghia-duc-mon-La-bach (Edmund Roberts), Captain Duc-giai Tam-gia (David Geisinger), and their party, to our country, bearers of a letter transmitting the desire to enter into relations with us. Their ship anchored at Vung-Lam, port of Phu Yen. Our Government ordered Chief of the Office of Ministries Nguyen Tri Phuong and the Deputy Chief of the Office of Ministries Ly Van Phuc to join with the mandarins of the said province to go aboard the ship and to give there a welcoming banquet. Questioned about the purpose of their voyage, these foreigners answered that their intent was to create good commercial relations. Their words were marked with respect and courtesy...

Roberts returned to Vietnam for the second time on May 14, 1836, as his second attempt to establish relation with Minh Mang, but he succumbed to severe illness which halted his efforts. According to the ship doctor William Ruschenberger, Minh Mạng sent an emissary to Đà Nẵng to see the American delegation. The emissary demanded Roberts to deliver the President's letter to him, which was refused, due to Roberts' illness and lack of adequate interpreters. After shaking hands with the Vietnamese representative, Ruschenberger and the USS Peacock departed Vietnam for Macao. Edmund Roberts died there on June 12 before the delegation could achieve anything. Minh Mang promptly responded:

Crossing the oceans and a distance of forty thousand stades (20,000 miles), driven by sentiments of admiration for the power and virtue of our Government, they have come all this way. If we were resolutely to break all relations with them, we would prove to them that we lack generous goodwill...We did not oppose their coming. We did not pursue them on their departure. We behaved according to the manners of a civilized nation. What good would it do for us to complain of foreign barbarians?

US Navy tried to intervene in Vietnam in 1845, 1850, and 1861, as it did in Japan in 1853.

=== World War II and emergence of Cold War ===
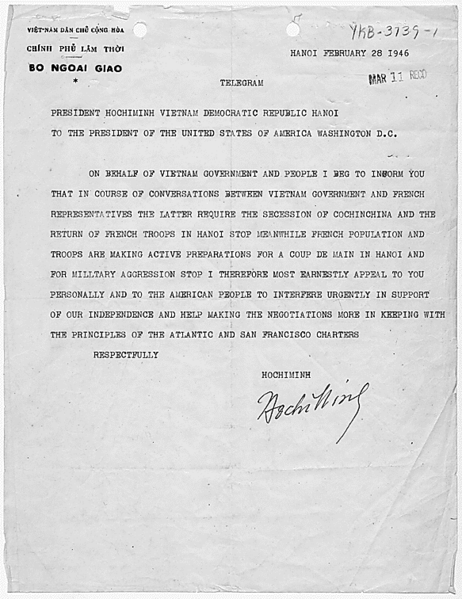
A 1946 telegram sent by Ho Chi Minh, head of the DRV's Provisional Government, addressed to president Harry S. Truman

French Indochina in World War II underwent significant political changes. By 1941, Japan gained full military access across Indochina and established a fragile dual colonial rule that maintained Vichy French administration while facilitating Japanese military operations. US president Franklin D. Roosevelt insisted that France not be allowed to retake Indochina after the war, but instead proposed that it be placed under an international trusteeship. However, before his death, Roosevelt reversed his position on the trusteeship idea, largely due to British opposition.

At the end of the Pacific War in 1945, American agents of the Office of Strategic Services, led by officer Archimedes Patti, arrived in Vietnam, where they met with the Viet Minh, led by communist Ho Chi Minh. The OSS Deer Team provided the Viet Minh with training and weapons to gather intelligence against the Japanese, while the Viet Minh also provided OSS agents with shelter. Further upheavals followed World War II, including the Vietnamese civil conflicts largely incited by the Viet Minh and the French reconquest of southern Indochina, as well as the death of OSS officer A. Peter Dewey, who was shot by Viet Minh fighters. The Viet Minh claimed they mistook Dewey for a French soldier, and Ho Chi Minh reportedly apologized to the US and ordered a search for Dewey's body, though the revolutionary and historian Trần Văn Giàu reported that Dewey's body was dumped in a nearby river and was never recovered.

Ho wrote several letters to US President Harry S. Truman and Secretary of State James F. Byrnes seeking diplomatic recognition for the Democratic Republic of Vietnam (DRV). The emergence of the Cold War and desires to maintain good relations with France prompted the US not to recognize the communist-led Viet Minh government. The DRV government had no genuine intention of seeking a long-term alliance with the US, but with the Soviet Union instead. The Indochinese Communist Party had long embraced a "two-camp" worldview and regarded the United States as a leading enemy of world revolution. Following the Chinese Communist victory in 1949, the ICP worked to bring the DRV into the socialist camp.

United States–State of Vietnam relations
- United States: State of Vietnam

With the outbreak of the First Indochina War, the US refused to publicly endorse French military action against the Viet Minh, but as much as the US abhorred colonialism, it detested communism even more. Several Vietnamese nationalists rallied around the former emperor Bảo Đại and worked with the French to establish the anticommunist State of Vietnam. From 1950, the United States recognized and supported the State of Vietnam against the communist-dominated DRV. Works related to Harry S. Truman’s recognition letter to Bao Dai at Wikisource

=== Vietnam War ===
United States–Republic of Vietnam relations
- United States: South Vietnam

Diplomatic mission
- United States Embassy, Saigon: South Vietnamese Embassy, Washington, D.C.

Envoy
- Ambassador: Ambassador

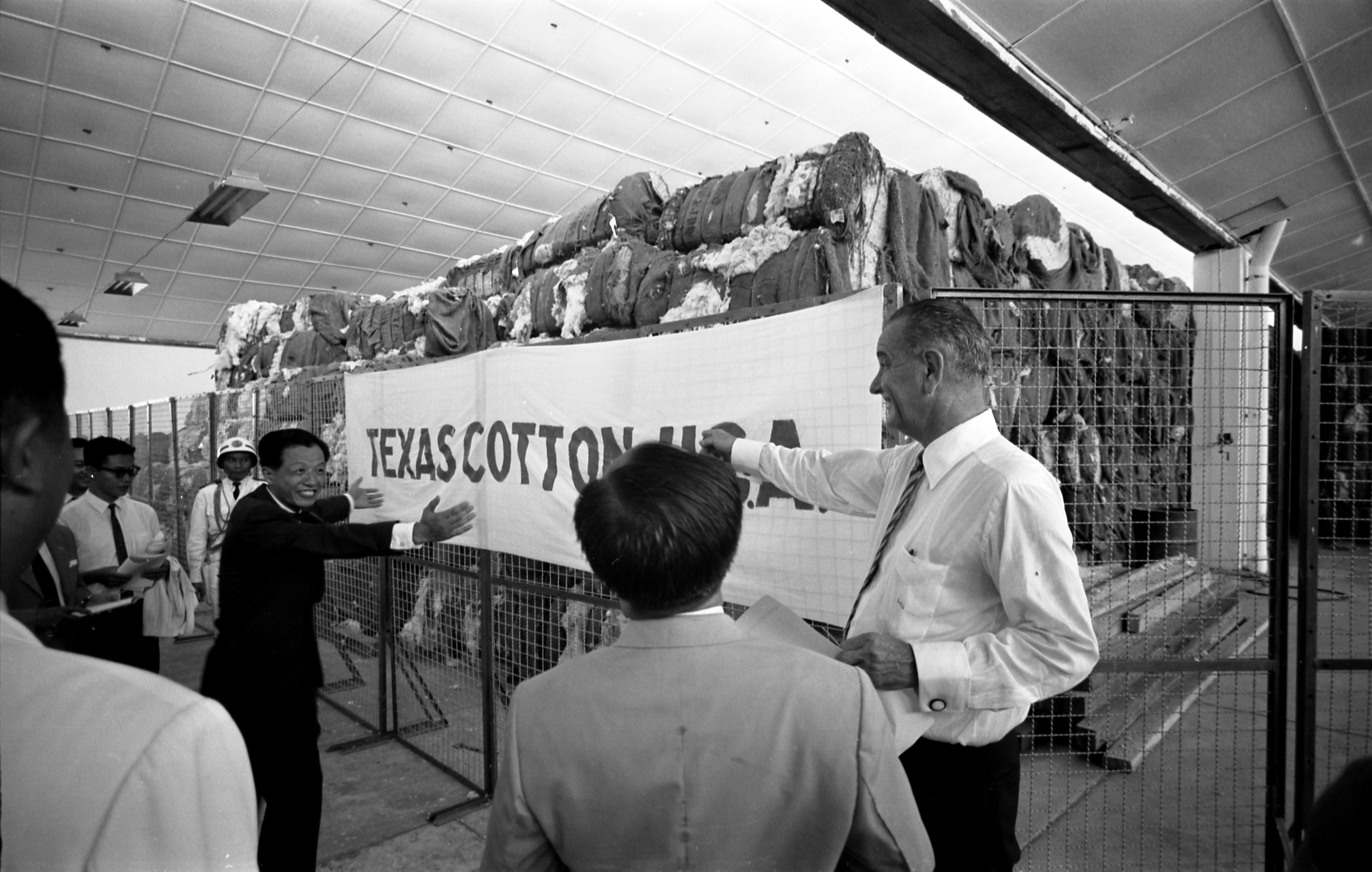
Vice President Lyndon B. Johnson visiting a textile mill in Saigon, 1961

In the 1954 Geneva Conference, French Indochina was dismantled and superseded by the independent states of North Vietnam, South Vietnam, Cambodia, and Laos. With the Cold War ongoing, Vietnam had been split into two opposing countries: North Vietnam, a communist state that opposed American ideals, and South Vietnam, an anticommunist state generally aligned with the US geopolitical outlook that communism needed to be contained. The two countries were divided at the 17th parallel north, not unlike the 38th parallel north that divided North Korea and South Korea in the Korean War. The Geneva Conference provided that a general election be held by July 1956 to unify Vietnam, but the agreements were neither directly accepted by the State of Vietnam nor the US, as both had opposed the partition in the first place. By July 1955, it was announced that South Vietnamese leader Ngo Dinh Diem would refuse the elections, citing concerns over communist manipulation.

MEDCAP personnel helps a Vietnamese old lady

The U.S. supported South Vietnam, having already supported France during the First Indochina War. The U.S. sent American military advisors to train and assist the Army of the Republic of Vietnam, and spent massive amounts of money in efforts to modernize the country; however, this created tensions between the U.S. and North Vietnam. Tensions reached a breaking point following the 1964 Gulf of Tonkin incident, when the U.S. accused the Vietnam People's Navy of attacking the USS Maddox and other United States Navy vessels on two separate occasions. While the first incident barely damaged the USS Maddox and resulted in 10 Vietnamese casualties (4 killed and 6 wounded), the second incident was contentious, and was proven to not have happened in the 2000s. However, at the time, U.S. President Lyndon B. Johnson used both incidents as justification to take any necessary retaliatory measures; the U.S. Congress promptly passed the Gulf of Tonkin Resolution, which authorized the deployment of American forces in Vietnam.

International Voluntary Services volunteer with Vietnamese students

The Gulf of Tonkin incident started American involvement in the Second Indochina War, known in the Western world as the "Vietnam War". For 11 years, the U.S., South Vietnam, and their allies fought North Vietnam, the National Liberation Front, and their allies. Though the U.S. and South Vietnam used air superiority, close air support, and Central Intelligence Agency-led intelligence operations to their advantage, North Vietnam and the Viet Cong made use of guerrilla warfare, though their tactics gradually became more conventional as the war progressed. The Vietnam War was a massive undertaking for all involved: North Vietnam and the Viet Cong had around 690,000 soldiers by 1966, South Vietnam had a strength of 1.5 million soldiers by 1972, and the U.S. deployed a total of 2.7 million soldiers over the course of American involvement, peaking at 543,000 in April 1969. The U.S. spent roughly $140 billion ($950 billion in 2011) in direct expenses to South Vietnam to build infrastructure, train an army and police force, and modernize the country. Casualties and destruction caused by the war were immense, with the conflict killing between 1.3 million and 3.4 million people, a combined total of combatants and non-combatants from both sides. American society was greatly polarized by the war, which coincided with the height of the counterculture phenomenon and civil rights movement; opposition to American involvement in the Vietnam War was related to these movements, but was a major and significant movement in its own right. American sympathies toward and perspectives on Vietnam depended on political stance, and the U.S. government itself experienced divisions between pro-war and anti-war politicians.

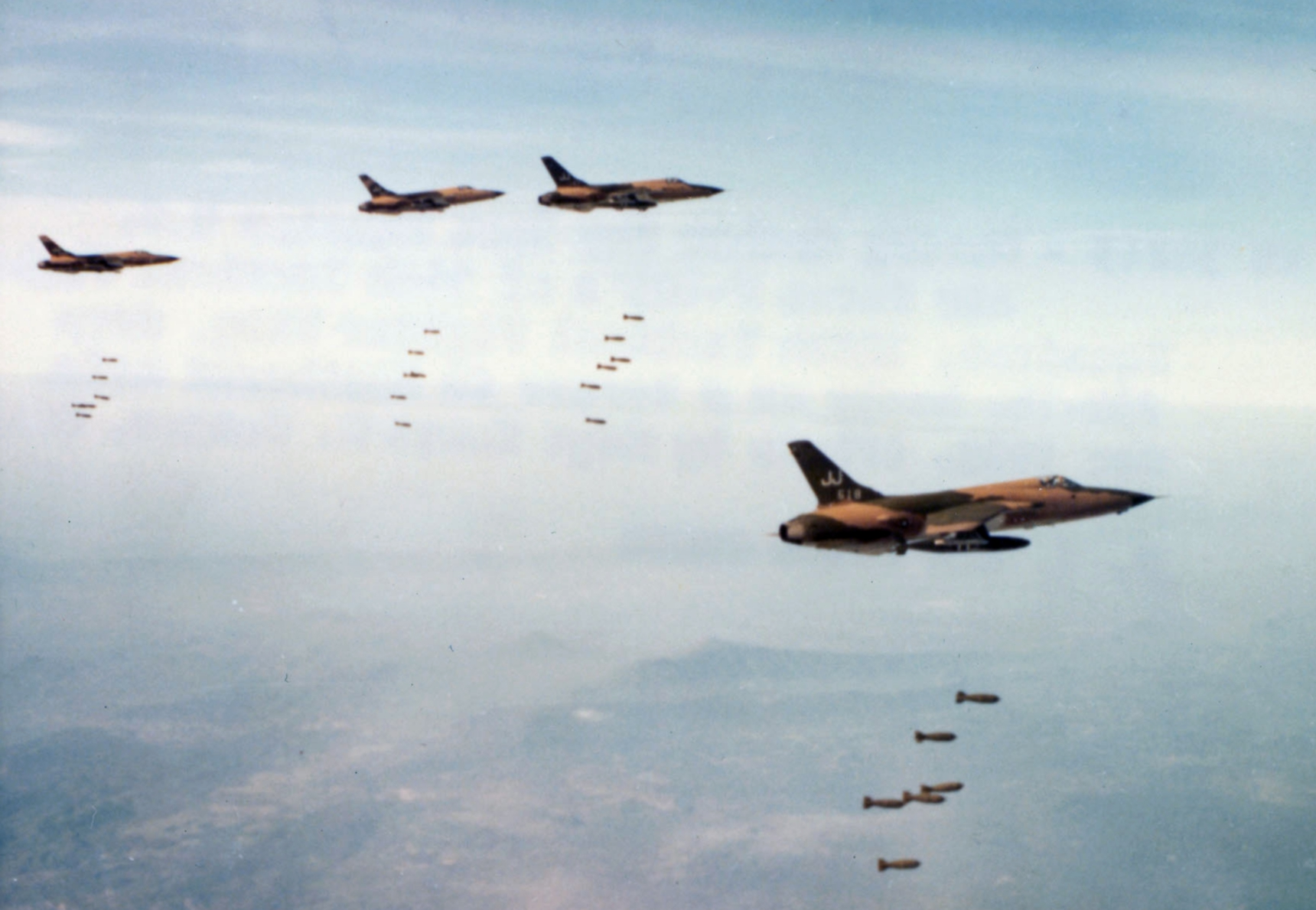
The bombing of North Vietnam during Operation Rolling Thunder from 1965 to 1968

To the United States, the Vietnam War was a Cold War conflict of political ideologies. Though the U.S. outwardly intervened in the interests of freedom, determination, and sovereignty, this was only when communism was not a major factor. However, North Vietnam was a communist country with relations to communist China and the Soviet Union, and was already surrounded and assisted by communist organizations elsewhere in Indochina such as the Khmer Rouge and the Pathet Lao, providing credence to the idea that communism was a global and monolithic force. By defeating North Vietnam, communist "tyranny and aggression" could be contained, and the security of Indochina could be preserved, with a unified Vietnam under Southern rule serving as a bulwark against communism in the region.

To North Vietnam, the war against the U.S. was simply an extension of their greater war for independence. In their view, the U.S. had merely replaced the French's role as another major-power colonialist obstacle to independence, Vietnamese reunification under Northern rule, and the rise of communism and postcolonial states in Indochina.

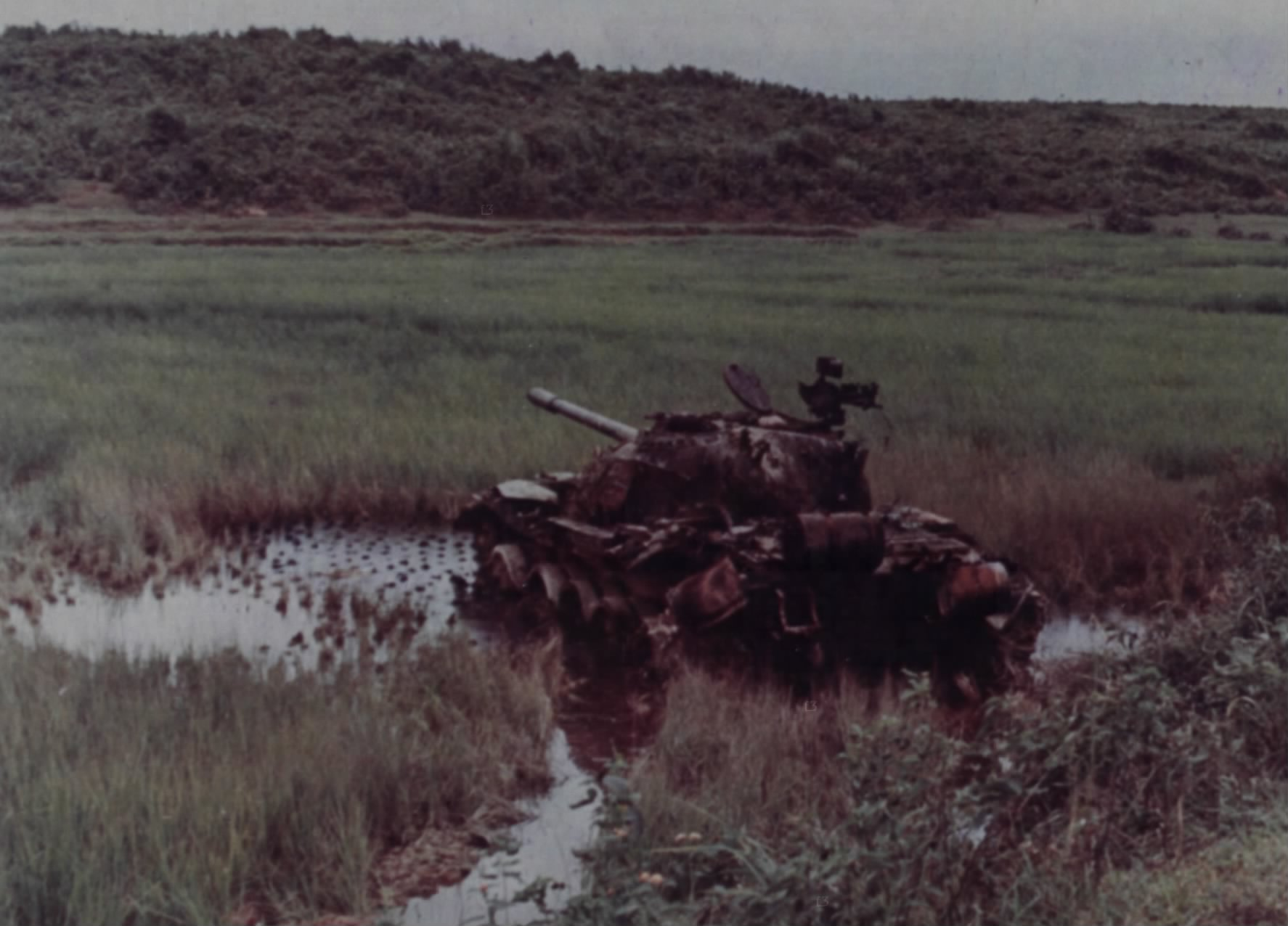
The wreckage of a People's Army of Vietnam T-54 tank, destroyed by Army of the Republic of Vietnam soldiers, 1972

In 1969, with the Vietnam War becoming increasingly unpopular in the United States, U.S. president Richard Nixon enacted a plan of "Vietnamization", where U.S. military forces withdrew from combat roles and instead only provided intelligence, support, and logistics, with the end goal being a self-sufficient South Vietnam capable of fighting the conflict themselves. By 1972, U.S. forces had largely withdrawn, and their operations were limited to air support, artillery support, advisors, and materiel shipments. On 27 January 1973, the Paris Peace Accords were signed by the U.S., North Vietnam, South Vietnam, and Viet Cong representatives. The Accords called for a ceasefire, withdrawal of all U.S. forces, continuance in place of North Vietnamese troops in the South, and the eventual reunification of Vietnam "through peaceful means". In reality, once the last U.S. combat troops left Vietnam in March 1973, and the U.S. was effectively barred from providing military assistance in Indochina under the 1973 Case–Church Amendment, there was no effective way to prevent North Vietnam from overwhelming South Vietnam's defenses, and the Accords proved unenforceable.

North Vietnam and South Vietnam continued to fight for two more years, from 1973 to 1975, but South Vietnam, having to fight without the American support to which it had become accustomed, and lacking the financial support to pay its troops or supply them properly, suffered severe losses of personnel and territory to North Vietnamese forces. In March 1975, North Vietnamese General Võ Nguyên Giáp of North Vietnam, planning to test American resolution, sent General Văn Tiến Dũng to launch an attack on Buôn Ma Thuột; when the U.S. Congress blocked attempts to support South Vietnam, Giáp launched a full-scale invasion of South Vietnam, and by late April, North Vietnamese forces had surrounded the South Vietnamese capital of Saigon. The U.S. launched Operation Frequent Wind, sending U.S. Navy Task Force 76 to evacuate Saigon before North Vietnamese forces could capture the city, initially only to evacuate American embassy staff but eventually accepting South Vietnamese civilians and military personnel as they boarded evacuation flights or flew their own aircraft to the evacuation fleets, to the point that aircraft that were not being used had to be pushed off aircraft carriers to make space for more. In Operation Frequent Wind, a total of 1,373 Americans and 5,595 Vietnamese and third-country nationals were evacuated by helicopter, and the total number of Vietnamese evacuated by Frequent Wind or self-evacuated and ending up in the custody of the United States for processing as refugees to enter the United States totaled 138,869. Shortly after, North Vietnamese forces captured Saigon, ending the Vietnam War with a decisive North Vietnamese victory and initiating the reunification of Vietnam into the modern Socialist Republic of Vietnam. Saigon was renamed to Ho Chi Minh City, but the capital of Vietnam remained in Hanoi.

==== Agent Orange ====
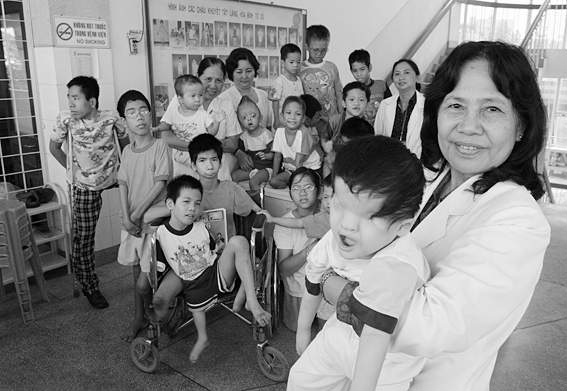
A Vietnamese professor with a group of handicapped children, many of whom developed birth defects resulting from the use of Agent Orange

"Agent Orange" was a herbicide and defoliant used by the U.S. as part of Operation Ranch Hand, a herbicidal warfare program initiated by the U.S. military. Developed from 1962 to 1971, Agent Orange consists of a fifty-fifty mixture of 2,4,5-T and 2,4-D, over 20 million gallons of it were produced by the U.S. over the course of the war. Agent Orange was primarily intended to destroy the foliage used as concealment by North Vietnamese soldiers.

The 2,4,5-T used to produce Agent Orange was later discovered to be contaminated with 2,3,7,8-Tetrachlorodibenzodioxin, an extremely toxic dioxin compound. Agent Orange's use led to the deaths of thousands of people, the destruction of over 3.1 million hectares (31,000 km^{2} or 11,969 mi^{2}) of Vietnam's forests, and up to a million Vietnamese and Americans alike experiencing birth defects, disabilities, and health problems resulting from the toxic chemicals used in Agent Orange. The Viet Nam Red Cross Society estimates that up to 1 million people are disabled or have health problems due to the effects of Agent Orange, but the U.S. government has dismissed these figures as unreliable and unrealistically high.

==== Prisoners of war and missing soldiers ====
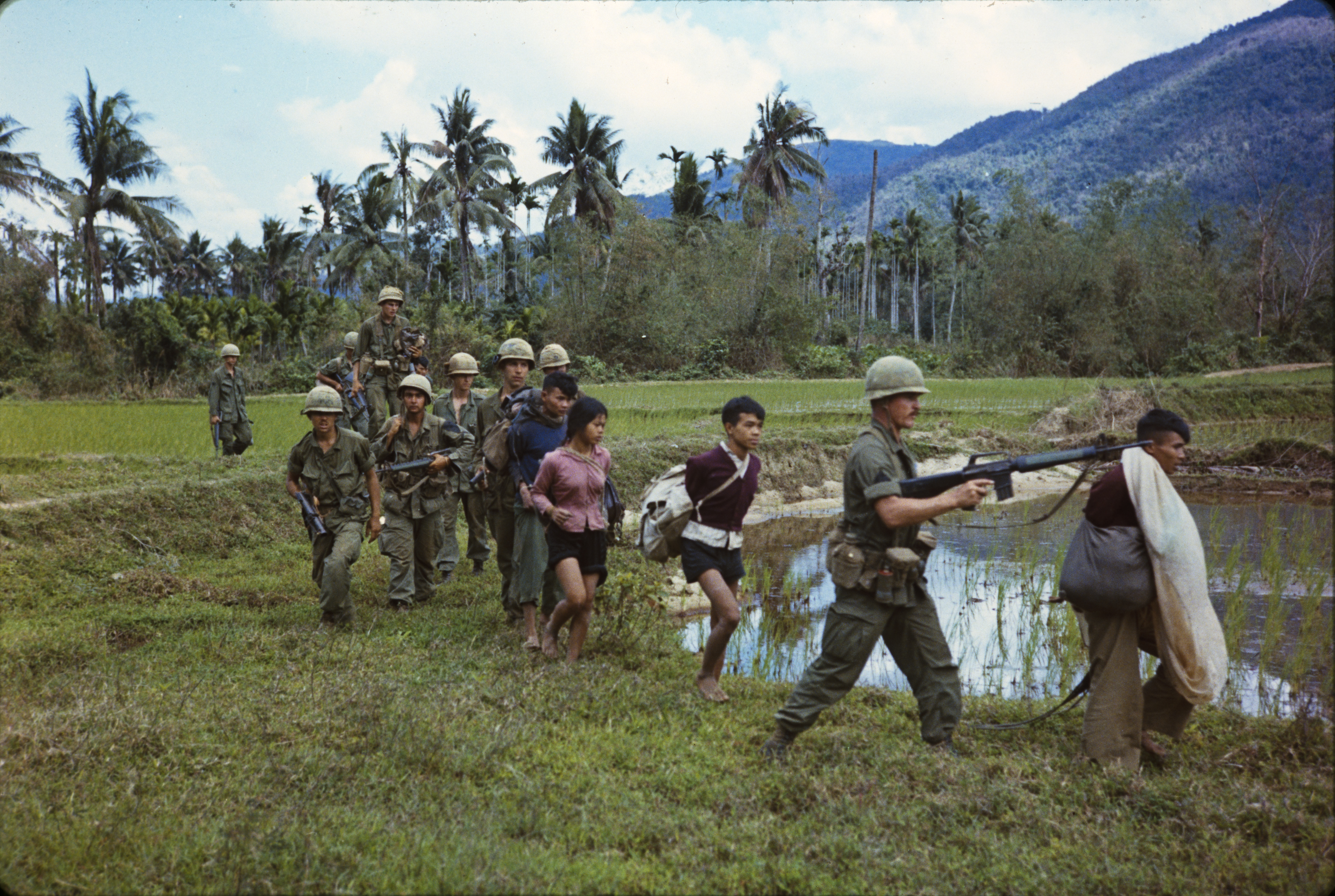
Captured Viet Cong guerrillas in 1967

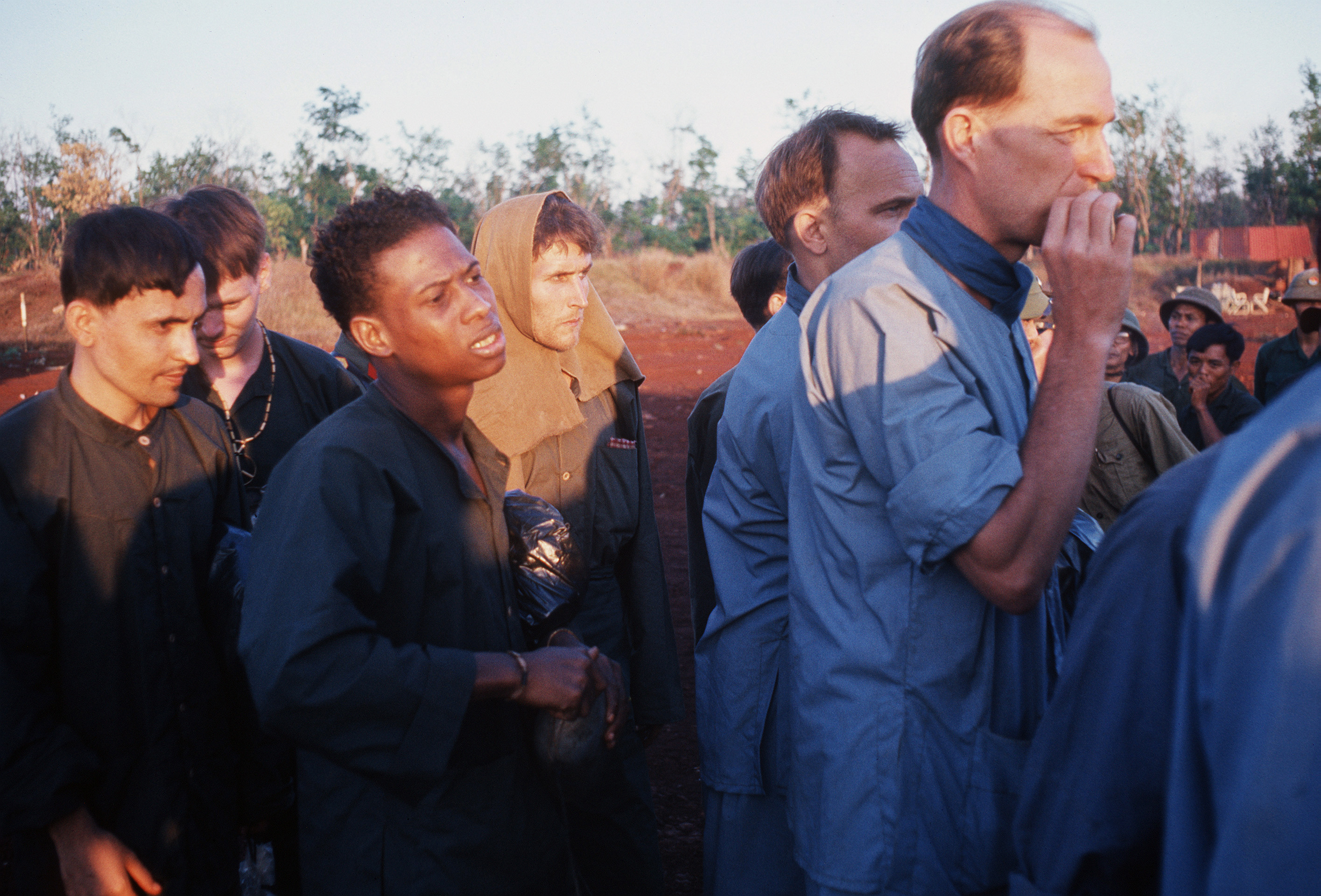
American POWs being released by North Vietnamese and Viet Cong captors in February 1973

Following American withdrawal from the Vietnam War in 1973, the U.S. listed about 2,500 Americans as prisoners of war (POW) or missing in action (MIA), but only 1,200 Americans were reported to have been killed in action with no body recovered. Only 591 American POWs were returned during Operation Homecoming in early 1973. Many American MIAs were pilots who were shot down over North Vietnam or Laos. Investigations of these incidents have involved determining whether the men involved survived being shot down; if they did not survive, then the U.S. government considers efforts to recover their remains. The U.S. POW and MIA issue greatly affected attempts at normalizing diplomatic ties between the U.S. and Vietnam in the aftermath of the Vietnam War.

As of 2007, the U.S. government listed 1,763 Americans unaccounted for in Southeast Asia, including 1,353 in Vietnam. Since 1973, 883 Americans have been accounted for, including 627 in Vietnam. Additionally, the U.S. Department of Defense has confirmed that of the 196 individuals who were officially considered "last known alive", the U.S. government has determined the fate of all but 31. The U.S. considers achieving the fullest possible accounting of Americans missing and unaccounted for in Indochina to be one of its highest priorities with Vietnam.

=== Severance of diplomatic ties and attempts at normalization ===
Following the Vietnam War, Vietnam pursued the establishment of diplomatic relations with the United States. This was initially to obtain US$3.3 billion in reconstruction aid, which U.S. president Richard Nixon had secretly promised after the Paris Peace Accords were signed, in the form of a letter offering a specific figure. In June 1975, Vietnamese Premier Phạm Văn Đồng, speaking to the National Assembly, invited the U.S. to normalize relations with Vietnam and to honor its commitment to provide reconstruction funds. Representatives of two American banks—the Bank of America and First National City Bank—were invited to Hanoi to discuss trade possibilities, and American oil companies were informed that they were welcome to apply for concessions to search for oil in Vietnamese waters.

However, the U.S. government neglected Đồng's call for normalized relations, because it was predicated on reparations, and the American political climate in the wake of the war precluded the pursuit of such an outcome. The U.S. also applied a trade embargo against Vietnam in 1975. In response to Vietnam, the administration of U.S. president Gerald Ford imposed its own precondition for normal relations by announcing that a full accounting of American POWs and MIA, including the return of any remains, would be required before normalization attempts. No concessions were made on either side until U.S. president Jimmy Carter softened the American demand from a full accounting to simply the fullest possible accounting, and dispatched a diplomatic mission to Vietnam in 1977 to initiate normalization discussions.

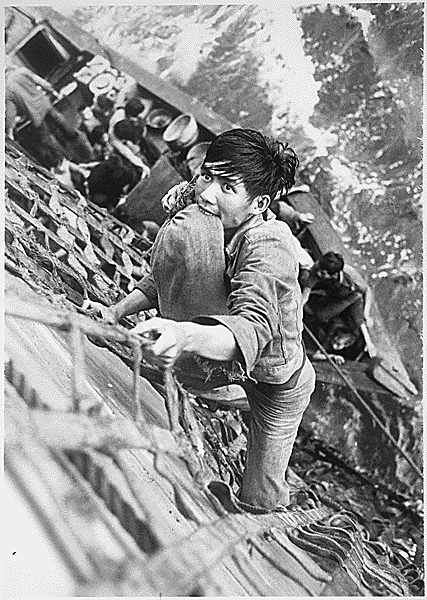
A Vietnamese refugee fleeing Vietnam by boat climbs a rope ladder to the deck of the USS White Plains, 1979

Although Vietnam was initially adamant about American economic assistance (their first postwar economic plan counted on the amount promised by President Nixon), the condition was dropped in mid-1978, when Vietnamese Foreign Minister Nguyễn Cơ Thạch and the U.S. government reached an agreement in principle on normalization, but the date was left vague. When Thạch urged November 1978, the U.S. government was noncommittal: at that time, the U.S. was preoccupied with a large influx in Vietnamese boat people, and they were already attempting to normalize relations with China; relations between Vietnam and China were strained at the time—eventually deteriorating into the Sino-Vietnamese War in 1979—and the U.S. did not wish to risk their relations with China by normalizing relations with one of China's enemies. The Vietnamese government responded by formalizing their relations with the Soviet Union. Their original hope, however, had been to gain both diplomatic recognition from the United States and a friendship treaty with the Soviet Union, as a double guarantee against future Chinese interference. In the U.S., the issue of normalizing relations with Vietnam was complicated by the Cambodian–Vietnamese War, the Vietnamese refugee crisis, and the unresolved POW and MIA issues, with U.S. President Ronald Reagan continuing to enforce the trade embargo and barring normalization as long as Vietnamese troops occupied Cambodia. Any efforts to improve relations remained closely tied to the U.S.' willingness to honor its 1973 aid commitment to Vietnam and Vietnam's failure to account for the whereabouts of American MIAs in Indochina.

Beginning in mid-1978, however, Vietnam dropped its insistence that the MIA and aid questions be resolved as a precondition for normalization, and stopped linking the MIA issue to other unresolved matters between the two countries. Vietnamese leaders contrasted their restraint on the MIA issue with its alleged political exploitation by the United States as a condition for normal relations. As additional signs of goodwill, Hanoi permitted the joint U.S.-Vietnamese excavation of a B-52 crash site in 1985, and returned the remains of a number of American service members between 1985 and 1987. Vietnamese spokesmen also claimed during this period to have a two-year plan to resolve the MIA question, but did not reveal details.

Although Vietnam's Sixth National Party Congress in December 1986 officially paid little attention to restoring diplomatic relations with the U.S., the report of the Congress noted that Vietnam was continuing to hold talks with the U.S. on humanitarian issues, and expressed a readiness to improve relations. Although ambivalent in tone, the message was more positive than the 1982 Fifth National Party Congress report, which had attributed the stalemated relationship to American "hostile policy." The improved wording was attributable to the influence of newly appointed Party General Secretary Nguyễn Văn Linh, who was expected to attach high priority to expanding Vietnam's links with the West. Despite signs of improvement, in mid-1987, the Vietnamese government, having determined that cooperation had gained few concessions from the U.S., reverted to its pre-1978 position linking the aid and MIA issues. However, a meeting between Vietnamese leaders and Reagan's special envoy on MIAs, General John William Vessey Jr., in August 1987 yielded significant gains for both sides: in exchange for greater Vietnamese cooperation on resolving the MIA issue, the U.S. agreed to officially encourage charitable assistance for Vietnam. Although the agreement fell short of Hanoi's requests for economic aid or war reparations, it marked the first time that the U.S. had offered anything in return for Vietnamese assistance in accounting for the MIAs, and was an important step toward rapprochement.

=== Rapprochement ===
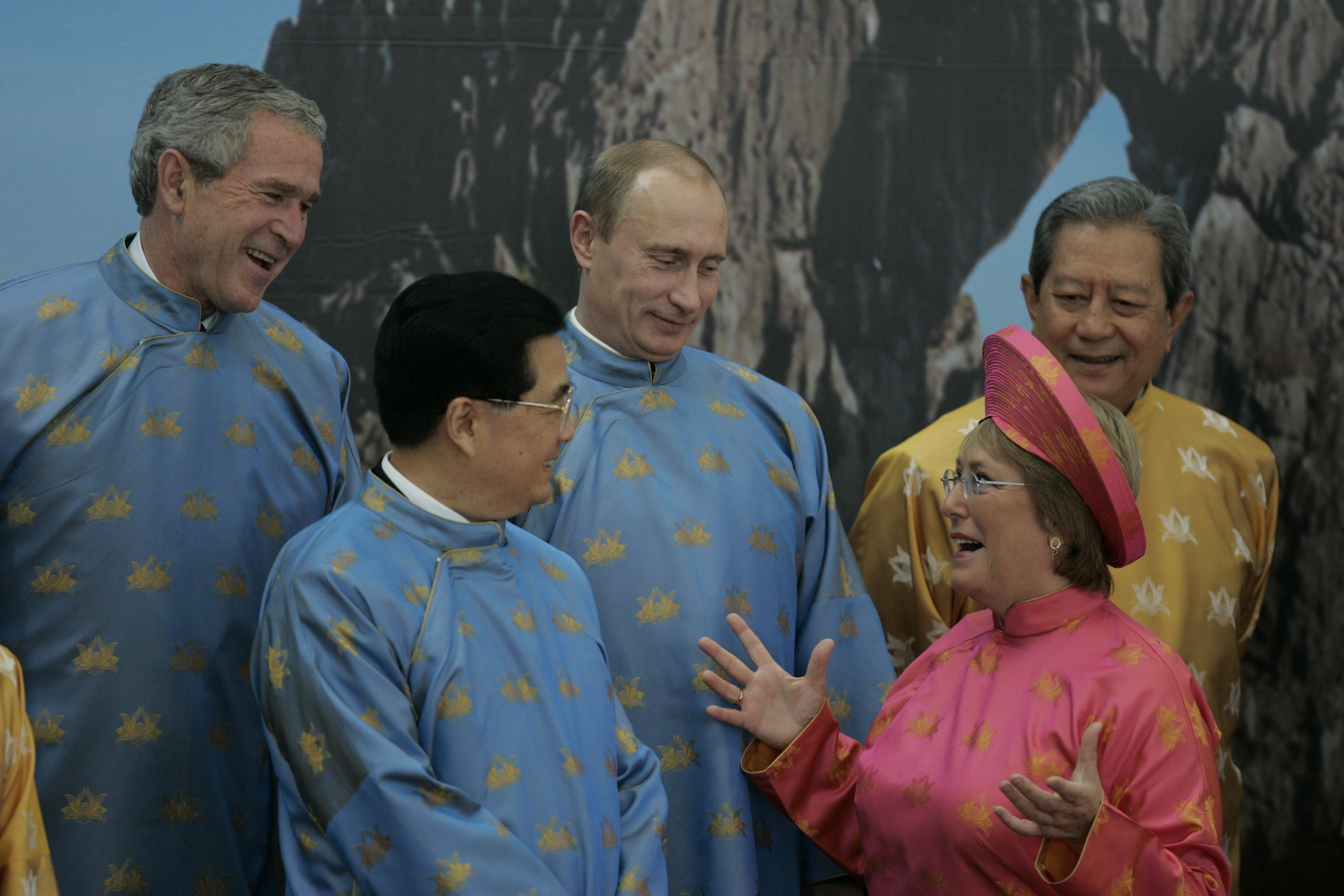
President George W. Bush (left) at the APEC Summit in Vietnam, November 2006

The influence of U.S. senators John McCain and John Kerry on U.S. president Bill Clinton was instrumental in the U.S. government's 1994 decision to lift the trade embargo against Vietnam. Both Kerry and McCain were decorated veterans of the Vietnam War who served on the Senate Select Committee on P.O.W./M.I.A. Affairs. In this role, they became intimately familiar with the issue of American MIAs, frequently traveling to Vietnam and coordinating with Vietnamese government officials. Following years of controversy in the U.S. over the fate of MIAs, as well as measurable progress by the Vietnamese government in meeting related American demands, Kerry and McCain began to advocate lifting the embargo, believing the policy would foster binational reconciliation, post-Vietnam War healing in the U.S., and further American economic and security interests. According to then-Senator Ted Kennedy, "John Kerry did it because the issue of the war burned in his soul, and he found a soulmate in John McCain." On many occasions, McCain and Kerry met personally with Clinton to promote lifting the embargo. In one conversation with Clinton, McCain stated, "It doesn't matter to me anymore, Mr. President, who was for the war and who was against the war. I'm tired of looking back in anger. What's important is that we move forward now." In arguing their case to Clinton, the senators "offered geopolitical and economic reasons, but also emphasized the matter of national honor, since the Vietnamese had diligently done all that we had asked them to in the matter of M.I.A [soldiers]."

The efforts of Kerry and McCain in the U.S. Congress and in the public sphere created the political capital and consensus necessary for the Clinton administration to lift the embargo. Although officials in the Clinton administration were ultimately in consensus to lift the embargo, the administration perceived they did not possess sufficient political credibility. Clinton had avoided military service in the Vietnam War as a young man, infamously describing the conflict in a letter in 1969 as "a war I opposed and despised with a depth of feeling I had reserved solely for racism in America before Vietnam." Consequently, Kerry and McCain sought to use their widespread credibility on the matter to create an environment in which Clinton could lift the embargo. In 1993, Kerry and McCain accompanied Clinton to the Vietnam Veterans Memorial, despite substantial opposition from veterans' groups. Moreover, the two men accompanied Clinton in 1993 "as his escorts" to "deliver the commencement address at Northeastern University." Later, in 1994, Kerry and McCain co-sponsored a bipartisan Senate resolution urging the Clinton administration to lift the embargo. Despite significant opposition from Republican leadership and veterans' groups, "McCain's sponsorship persuaded twenty Republicans to vote for the measure, which passed by a vote of sixty-two to thirty-eight." While developing the bill, Kerry was in frequent communication with officials within the Clinton administration. Following the vote, Kerry emphasized the promotion of national healing, stating, "it was time to put the war behind us." Likewise, McCain described the resolution as "a seminal event in U.S.–Vietnamese relations," adding that "the vote will give the President the... political cover he needs to lift the embargo."

The U.S. embargo on Vietnam was eventually lifted on February 3, 1994. Formal normalization of relations was announced and occurred in 1995, when both countries opened liaison offices that were later upgraded to formal embassies later in the year, with the U.S. later opening the Consulate General of the United States, Ho Chi Minh City, and Vietnam opening a consulate in San Francisco. In 1997, the Vietnamese government agreed to formally drop its request that the U.S. honors its 1973 aid commitment and instead to pay off the debts of the South Vietnamese government, then amounting to $140 million, in order to be allowed to trade with the U.S. Following this, trade volumes boomed between the two countries. Also in 1997, Clinton appointed former POW and U.S. Congressman Douglas "Pete" Peterson as the first U.S. Ambassador to Vietnam.

=== 21st century ===
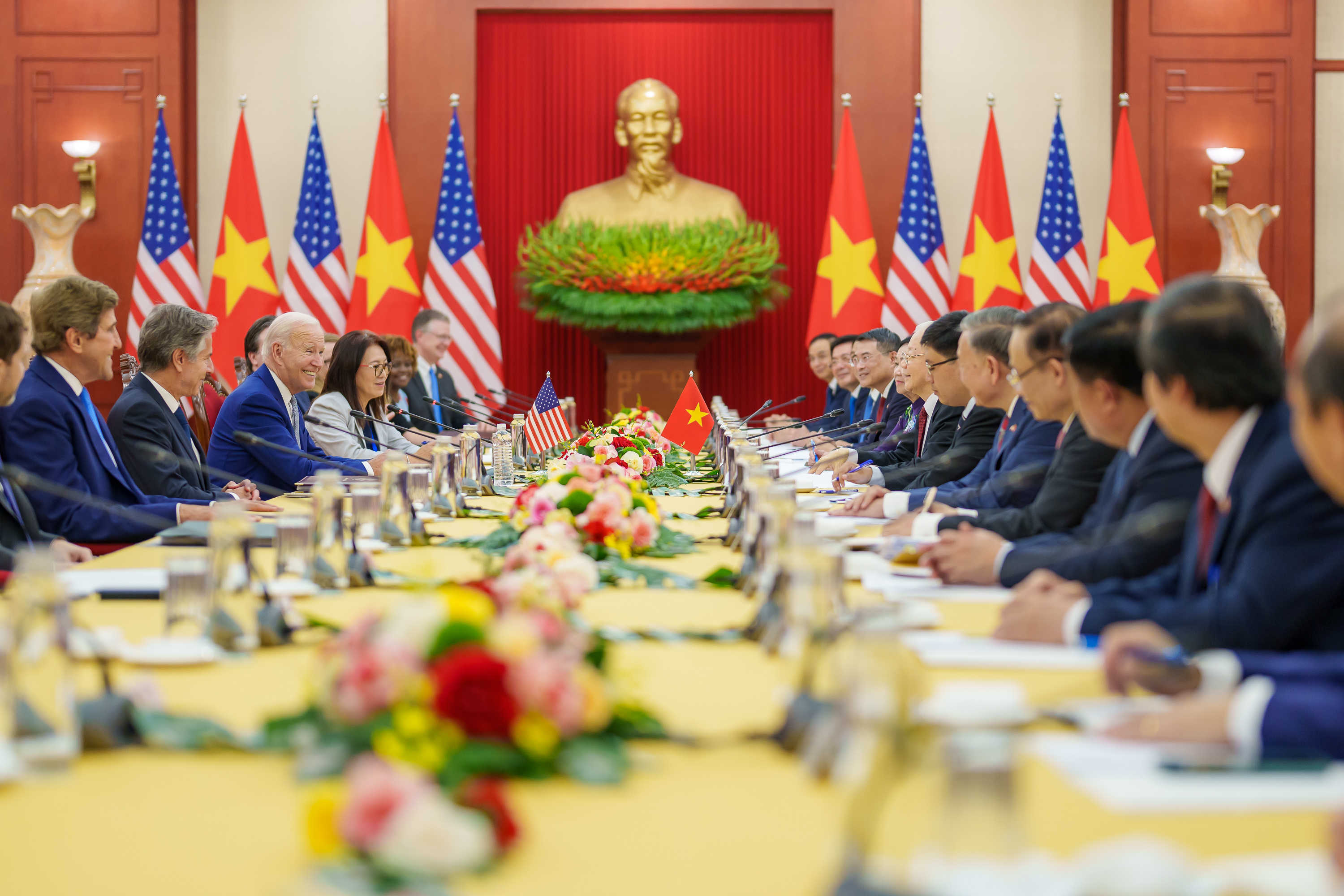
Top leaders of the two countries meet during Biden's 2023 Vietnam visit.

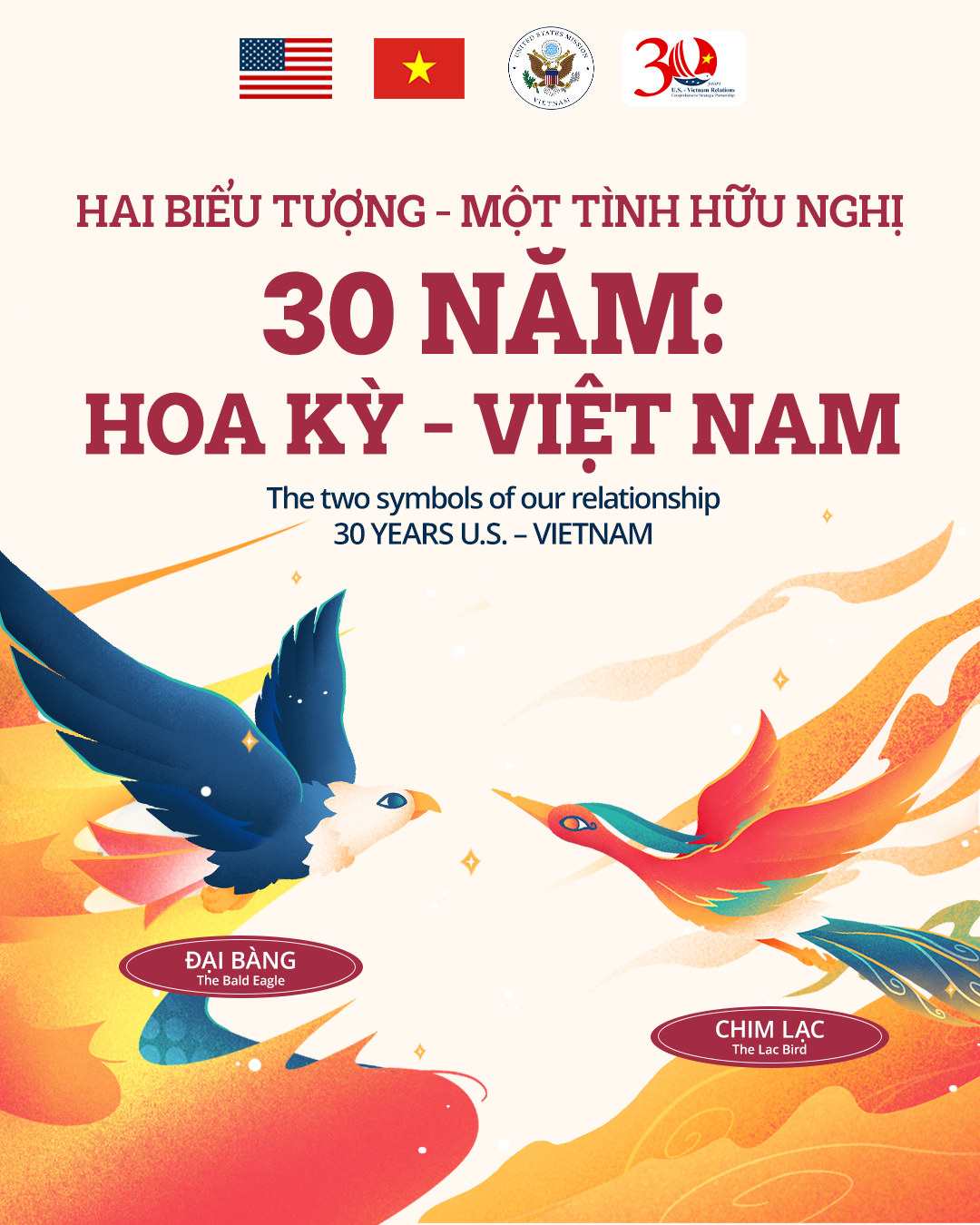
Panel commemorating 30 years of current US–Vietnam relations in 2025, featuring a bald eagle and a lạc bird.

President of the United States Bill Clinton made a historic visit to Vietnam in November 2000. He was the first U.S. leader ever to officially visit Hanoi and the first to visit Vietnam since U.S. troops withdrew from the country in 1975.

The annual Bilateral Human Rights Dialogue resumed in 2006 after a two-year hiatus. The U.S. and Vietnam signed a Bilateral Trade Agreement in July 2000, which went into force in December 2001. In 2003, the two countries signed a counter-narcotics Letter of Agreement (amended in 2006), a Civil Aviation Agreement, and a textile agreement. In January 2007, Congress approved Permanent Normal Trade Relations (PNTR) for Vietnam. In July 2015, the United States hosted Vietnamese Communist Party general secretary Nguyễn Phú Trọng in the first-ever visit of a Vietnamese Communist Party General Secretary to the United States following a concerted effort by the Obama administration to pursue warmer relations with Vietnam.

On 27–28 February 2019, the 2019 North Korea–United States Hanoi Summit was held between North Korean Supreme Leader Kim Jong Un and U.S. President Donald Trump in Hanoi, Vietnam.

During a visit to Vietnam on 10 September 2023, U.S. President Joe Biden visited with General Secretary Nguyễn Phú Trọng. Following this, the Vietnamese government recognized the relationship between the United States and Vietnam as a "Comprehensive Strategic Partnership," emphasizing the increasing importance of bilateral links between the countries. Biden said the aim of the agreement is not to reduce China's influence in Asia, but he is looking for economic growth and stability in Vietnam.

In June 2024, the United States criticized Vietnam's decision to host Russian President Vladimir Putin. The U.S. embassy in Hanoi said that "no country should give Putin a platform to promote his war of aggression and otherwise allow him to normalize his atrocities." A senior U.S. diplomat held talks in Vietnam and said that the trust between the two countries was at an all-time high.

On 18 January 2026, Tô Lâm accepted the invitation from U.S. President Donald Trump in his capacity of the General Secretary of the Communist Party of Vietnam to join the United States-led Board of Peace as a founding member.

== Human rights ==
Vietnam's suppression of political dissent and restrictions on freedom of speech have been an issue of contention in terms of Vietnam's relations with the United States, and Vietnam's actions against freedom of expression have drawn criticism from the U.S. government.

In spring 2007, Vietnam's government launched a crackdown on political dissidents, mostly anti-communist, and in November of that year, Vietnamese authorities arrested a group of pro-democracy activists, including two Americans. Despite continued suppression of dissent and expression, Vietnam made significant progress on expanding freedom of religion in 2005, when Vietnam passed comprehensive religious freedom legislation, outlawing forced renunciations and permitting the official recognition of new denominations. As a result, in November 2006, the U.S. Department of State lifted the designation of Vietnam as a "Country of Particular Concern," based on a determination that the country was no longer a serious violator of religious freedoms, as defined by the International Religious Freedom Act of 1998. This decision was reaffirmed by the Department of State in November 2007. However, serious concerns continue due to Vietnam's suppression of freedom of speech.

Although the statements of U.S. president Donald Trump on socialism and communism attract a lot of political dissidents and human rights activists in Vietnam, he was criticized for not mentioning human rights issues in Vietnam during his visit to Vietnam in 2017 and before the visit of Vietnamese Prime Minister Nguyễn Xuân Phúc to the United States.

== Economic relations ==
Since the start of the Đổi-mới reforms in Vietnam, foreign direct investment in Vietnam has become available. Trade and economic relations have expanded significantly since the political rapprochement between the two countries. In 2023, the bilateral trade volume in goods amounted to US$124 billion, of which US$114 billion were Vietnamese exports to the US. This made Vietnam the tenth-largest trading partner of America, and the US is Vietnam's most important export market. Due to the low production costs, the US initially imported mainly textiles from Vietnam, but the imports of high-tech goods have been surging. After the beginning of the trade conflict between the United States and China, many companies from the US are investing in Vietnam to diversify their supply chains. Apple, for example, is increasingly shifting its manufacturing from China to Vietnam and India. With the growth of the Vietnamese economy, Vietnamese companies are also increasingly active in the US. For example, the Vietnamese car manufacturer VinFast announced the construction of a production facility for electric cars in North Carolina in 2022.

US goods trade with Vietnam in billions of U.S. dollars (1995−2023)
| | 1995 | 2000 | 2005 | 2010 | 2015 | 2020 | 2023 |
|---|---|---|---|---|---|---|---|
| US exports to Vietnam | 0.3 | 0.4 | 1.2 | 3.7 | 7.1 | 10.0 | 9.8 |
| US imports from Vietnam | 0.2 | 0.8 | 6.6 | 14.9 | 38.0 | 79.7 | 114.4 |
| Trade balance (for the US) | 0.1 | −0.5 | −5.4 | −11.2 | −30.9 | −69.7 | −104.6 |

=== Trade pressures and immigration agreements ===
In March 2025, Vietnam agreed to expedite the deportation of Vietnamese nationals from the U.S. following threats of trade tariffs and visa sanctions from the Trump administration. The country pledged to issue travel documents for 30 detained individuals and respond to U.S. deportation requests within 30 days, marking a shift from its historically slow cooperation. This move came amid concerns that Vietnam, heavily reliant on exports to the US, could face economic repercussions. Most of the 8,600 Vietnamese facing deportation arrived as refugees before 1995.

In addition, Vietnam reduced tariffs on several American products, including liquefied natural gas (LNG) through energy agreements, as well as automobiles. Additionally, the country moved to approve Starlink services, projecting the satellite internet provider to operate under a five-year pilot program with a subscriber cap of 600,000.

In a phone call with U.S. President Donald Trump on 4 April, the General Secretary of the Communist Party of Vietnam Tô Lâm offered a "0%" tariff on American goods in exchange for lowering and eliminating tariffs against Vietnam, which Trump praised in a Truth Social post.

== Transport ==
In December 2003, the United States and Vietnam signed a Bilateral Air Transport Agreement. Several U.S. carriers already have third-party code sharing agreements with Vietnam Airlines. Direct flights between Ho Chi Minh City and San Francisco began in December 2004. In March 2007, Vietnam and the United States also signed a bilateral Maritime Agreement that opened the maritime transport and services industry of Vietnam to U.S. firms. In 2011, the U.S. banks agreed to invest $1.5 billion in Vietnamese infrastructure.

== Military ==
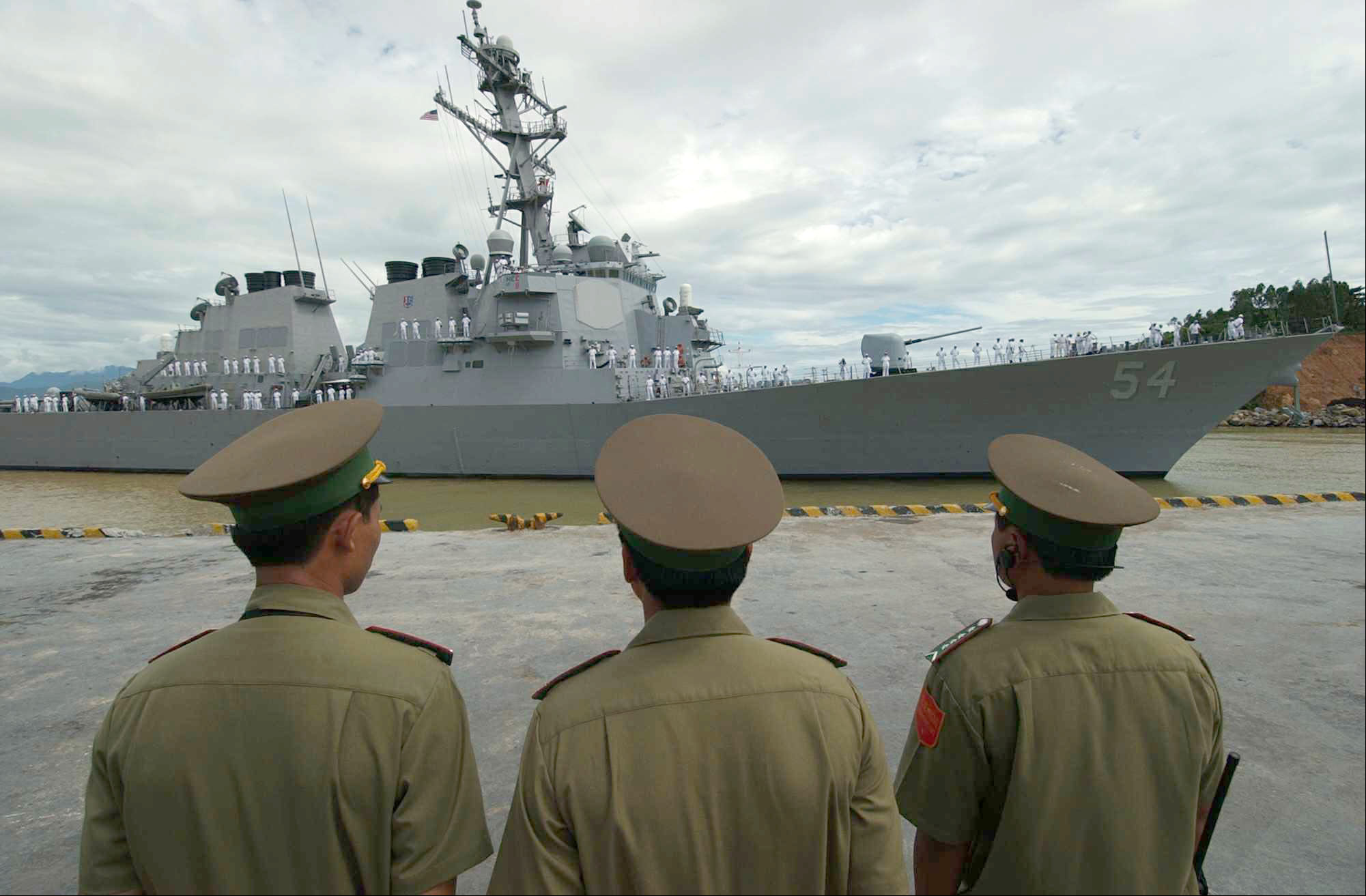
Vietnamese military officers watching the USS Curtis Wilbur preparing to dock at the port of Da Nang, July 2004

According to the Council on Foreign Relations, Vietnam's defense policy is based on the "Four 'No's" principle: no military alliances, no foreign troops stationed on Vietnamese soil, no partnering with a foreign power to combat another, and no force or threats of the use of force in international relations. This was historically "Three 'No's"; however, the fourth, denouncing the use of force, was added in the December 2019 "National Defense White Paper", which also stated that Vietnam is willing to allow ships from other countries to dock at its ports. Cooperation between the United States and Vietnam in other areas, such as defense, nonproliferation, counterterrorism, and law enforcement, is expanding steadily.

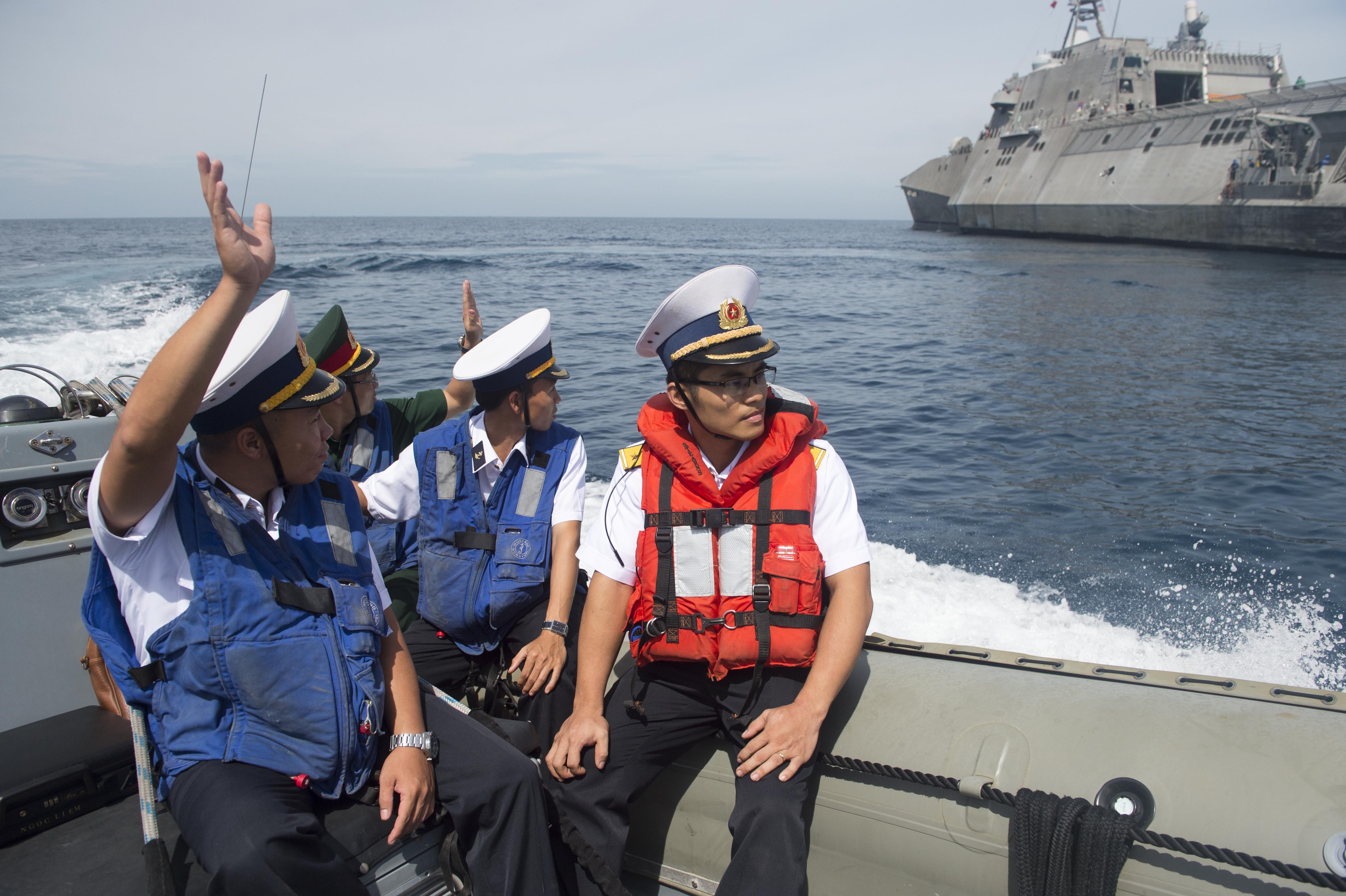
Members of the Vietnam People's Navy waving goodbye to the crew of the U.S. Navy's USS Coronado after an exchange between the two navies, 10 July 2017

The territorial disputes in the South China Sea with China, which has become more assertive in its territorial claims, have significantly strengthened relations between Vietnam, the U.S., and other Chinese rivals, including India and fellow ASEAN member and U.S. ally the Philippines. The U.S. favors an open South China Sea aligned with its broader Indo-Pacific strategy and because Chinese territorial claims in the region threaten the security and prosperity of its key regional allies. With Vietnam's historically complex relationship with China that included past territorial disputes, Vietnam feels that Chinese claims and actions in the South China Sea threaten its sovereignty and territorial integrity. In this regard, American and Vietnamese security interests align in their shared opposition to the Chinese territorial claims in the South China Sea.

In 2017, Vietnam hosted visits by five U.S. Navy vessels, including a port call to Da Nang by the amphibious assault ship USS Peleliu, which carried a multinational contingent of medical and engineering personnel. In June 2007, Vietnamese observers took part for the first time in the multinational naval exercise Cooperation Afloat Readiness and Training (CARAT), organized by the U.S. Navy. Vietnamese Prime Minister Nguyễn Tấn Dũng stated that the country is in the final stages of preparation to take part in international peacekeeping, as part of its contribution as a new member of the United Nations Security Council.

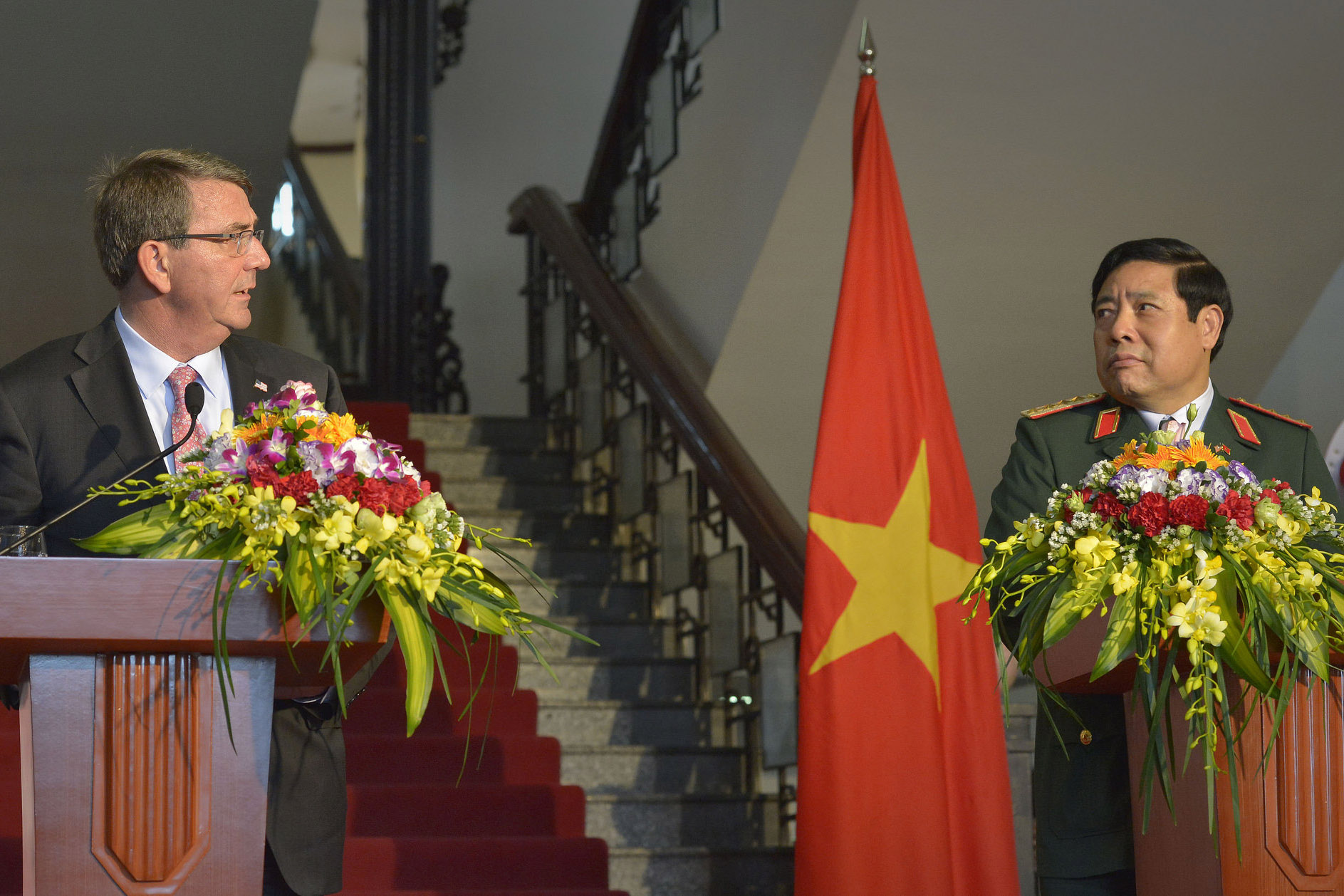
United States Secretary of Defense Ash Carter and Vietnamese Defense Minister General Phùng Quang Thanh in Hanoi, 1 June 2015

In April 2013, following increased tensions between Vietnamese fishing vessels and the China Coast Guard, which peaked a month prior after a Chinese warning flare accidentally set a Vietnamese fishing boat ablaze, the Vietnam People's Navy and U.S. Coast Guard cooperated to improve security in Vietnamese waters and resolve confrontations between Vietnamese fishers and Chinese vessels.

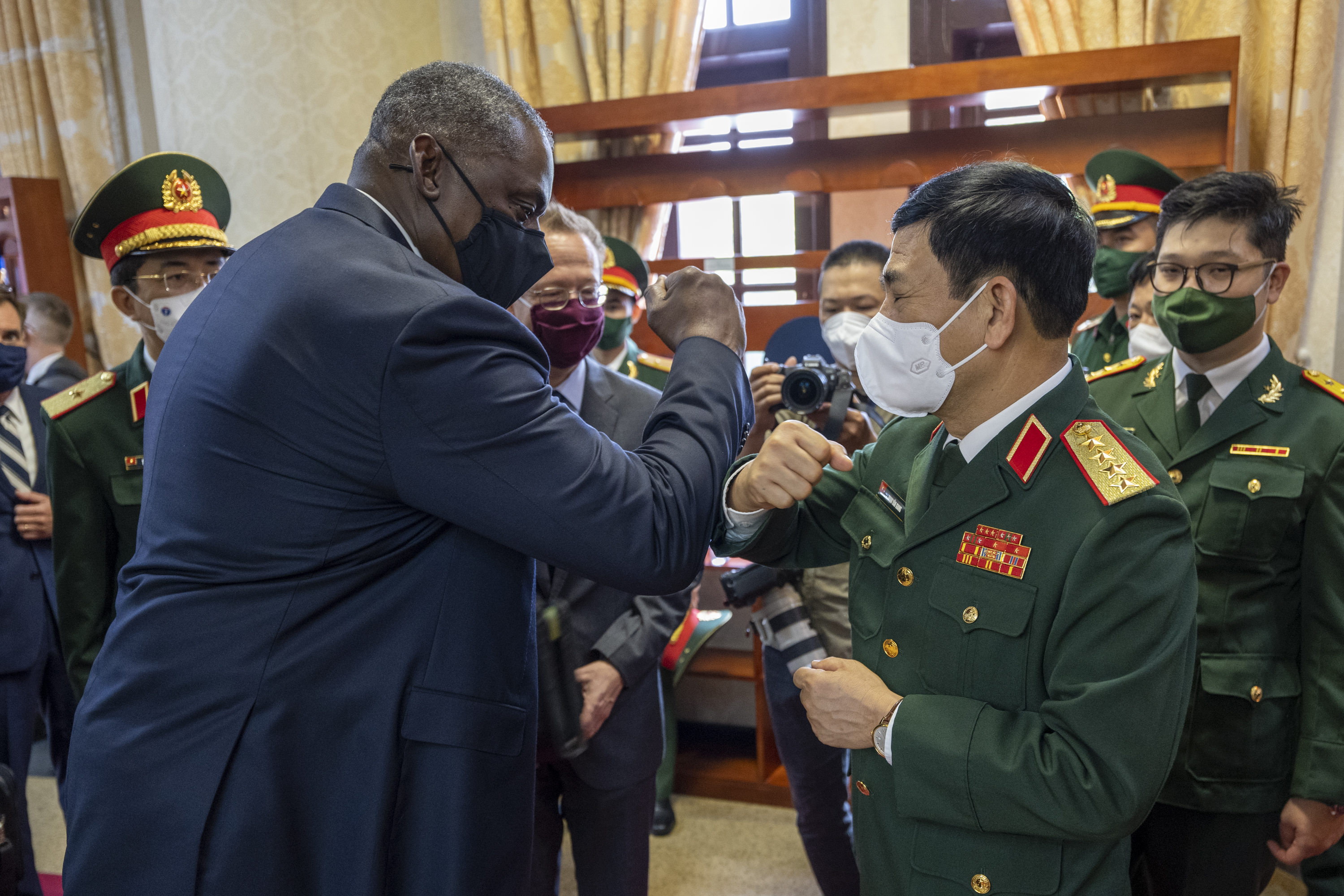
Defense Secretary Lloyd Austin and Defense Minister Phan Văn Giang in Hanoi, 29 July 2021

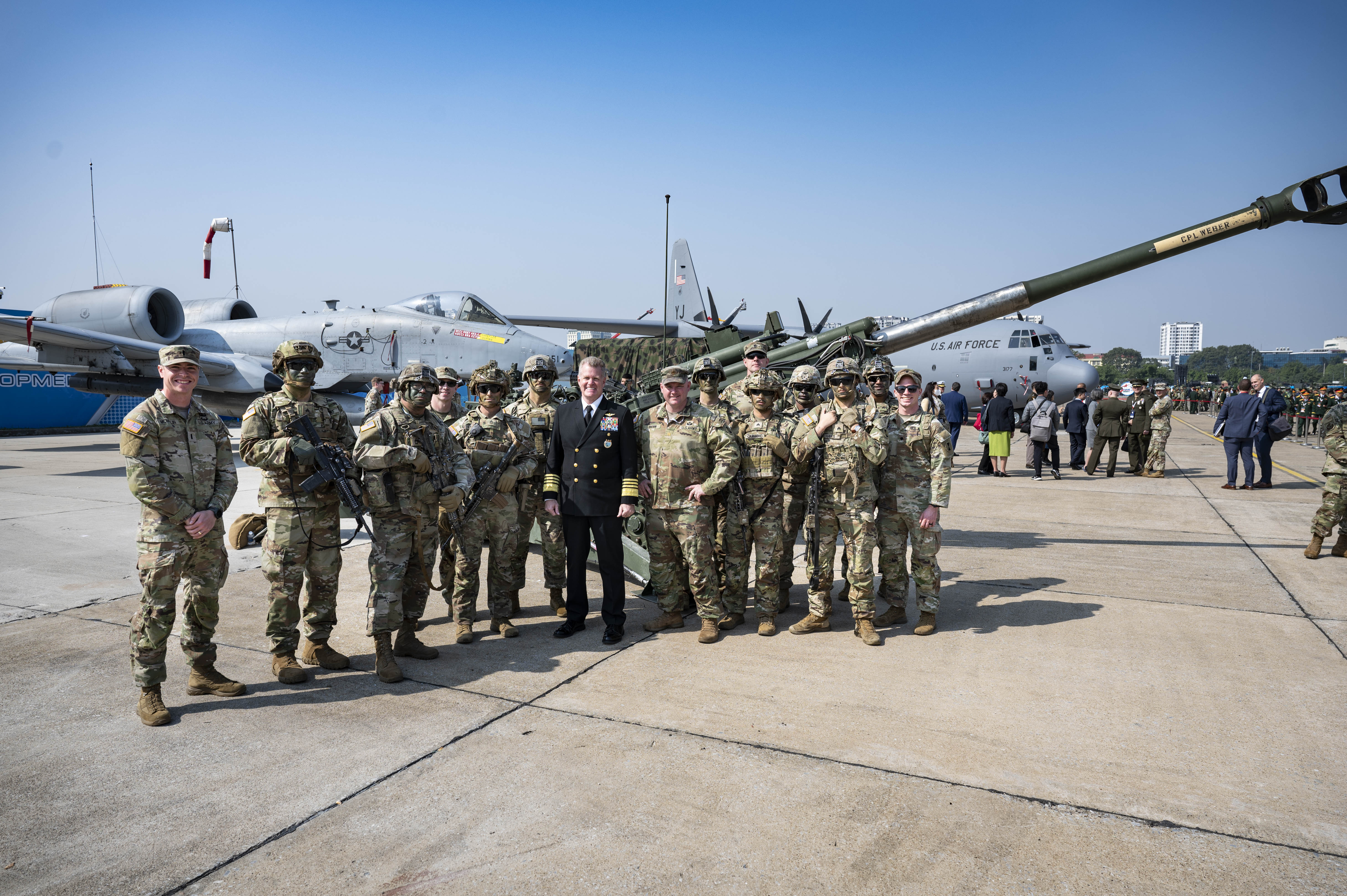
US delegates and inventories participating in the 2024 Vietnam Defence Expo.

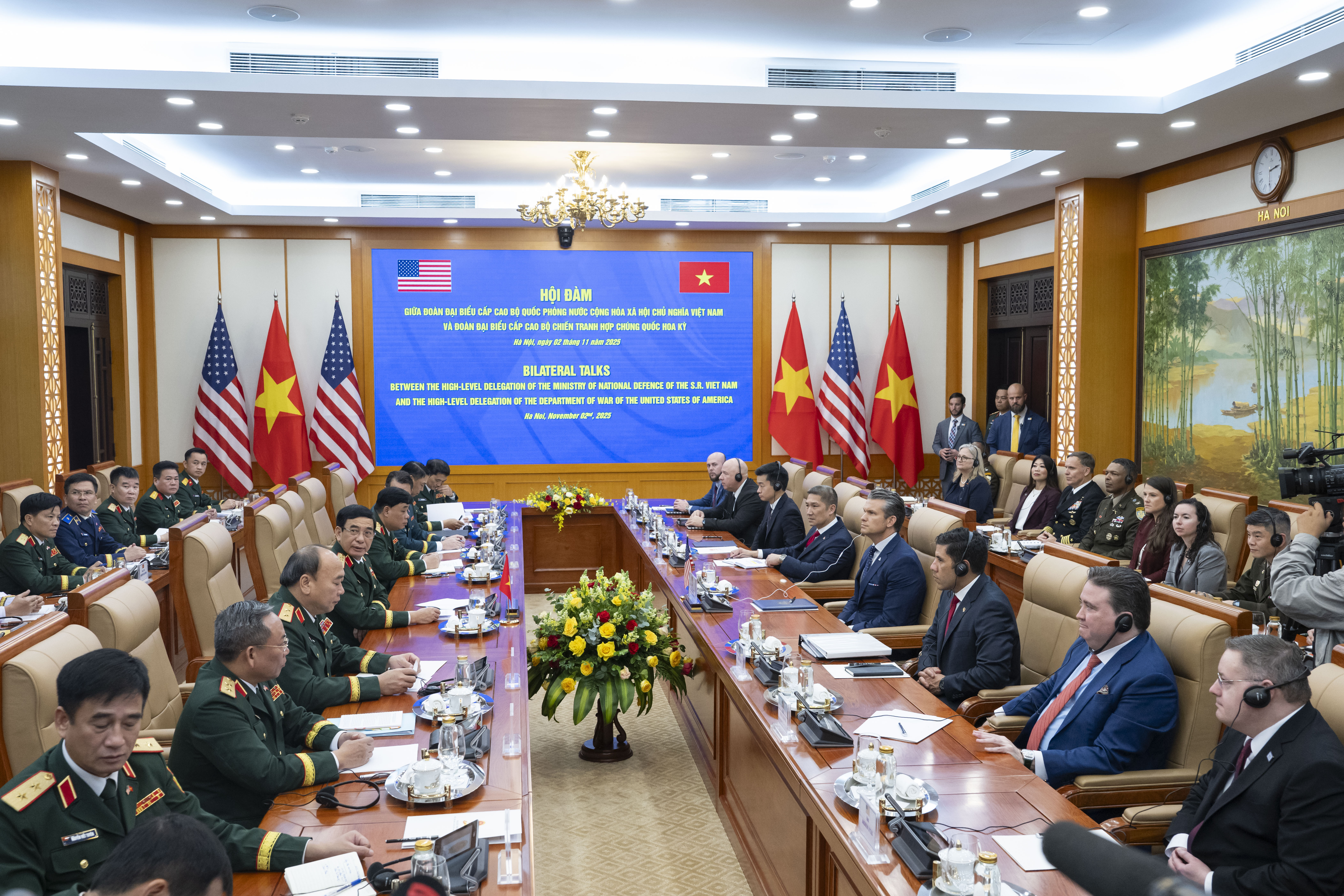
Secretary of Defense Pete Hegseth and Minister of Defense Phan Van Giang hold a bilateral exchange in Hanoi 2025.

In June 2013, Vietnamese Prime Minister Nguyễn Tấn Dũng said in a speech at the Shangri-La Dialogue in Singapore that he would welcome the U.S. playing a larger role in tempering regional tensions, as China and some of its Southeast Asian neighbors remain deadlocked over competing territorial claims in the South China Sea, saying, "No regional country would oppose the strategic engagement of extra-regional powers if such engagement aims to enhance cooperation for peace, stability and development. We attach special importance to the roles played by a vigorously rising China and by the United States — a Pacific power."

In October 2013, the United States and Vietnam signed a pact allowing for the transfer of nuclear fuel and technology from the U.S. to Vietnam, which is already working with Russia to complete its first nuclear plant by 2014 to meet its rising energy demands, with an American official noting that, "Vietnam is actively taking steps now toward development of a robust domestic infrastructure to support a nuclear energy program." In line with its more active engagement with Vietnam, the U.S. has provided funds and equipment for the Vietnamese naval capabilities. In 2013, Secretary of State John Kerry announced that the U.S. would provide Vietnam with $18 million to enhance the capacity of its coast guard.

Additionally, the U.S. and Vietnam also cooperate in the Clean Energy Sector. In 2014, the U.S. Ambassador to Vietnam announced the U.S. was providing technical assistance for developing wind power systems in Vietnam.

In early October 2014, the U.S. approved a relaxation of its longstanding arms embargo on Vietnam. In May 2016, President Barack Obama announced the full lifting of the embargo during his visit to Vietnam.

On 2 October 2016, U.S. Navy destroyer USS John S. McCain and submarine tender USS Frank Cable made the first port visit to Cam Ranh Bay since 1975. A U.S. Navy aircraft carrier (USS Carl Vinson) visited Vietnam in March 2018. According to the Vietnam Foreign Ministry, the visit would "contribute to maintaining peace, stability, security, cooperation and development in the region".

In May 2017, the U.S. delivered six 45-foot Defiant-class patrol boats to the Vietnam Coast Guard. The cooperation in matters of their naval capabilities suggests that the shared security concerns over the South China Sea have strengthened the U.S.-Vietnam military relationship.

The U.S.-Vietnam defense relationship, however, is limited by historical memory and Vietnam's multivector foreign policy. While fears about regime change have lowered, the U.S.'s frequent criticism of Vietnam's human rights situation is understood in the context of the Vietnam War and creates worry in Vietnam about the U.S.'s true intentions. This may serve to limit the scope and scale of military cooperation. Similarly, with its multivector foreign policy, Vietnam avoids aligning too closely with any particular regional power, and in particular limits its engagement with the U.S. to avoid upsetting China. To that end, Russia, not the U.S., is the largest arms exporter to Vietnam.

== Diplomatic missions ==
The U.S. Embassy in Vietnam is located in Hanoi. The U.S. Consulate General is located in Ho Chi Minh City. The Vietnamese Consulate General to the U.S. is located in San Francisco, California. In 2009, the United States received permission to open a consulate in Da Nang; in 2010, Vietnam officially inaugurated a consulate general in Houston.

=== Principal U.S. officials ===
- Ambassador – Jennifer Wicks
- Consul General – Melissa A. Brown

Of Vietnam

- Washington, D.C. (Embassy)
- San Francisco (Consulate)
- New York City (Consulate)
- Houston (Consulate)

Of the United States

- Hanoi (Embassy)
- Ho Chi Minh City (Consulate)

== See also ==
- United States assistance to Vietnam
- U.S.–South Vietnam relations
- U.S. Military Assistance Command in Vietnam
- U.S.-Vietnam Dialogue Group on Agent Orange/Dioxin
- Vietnamese Americans
- Vietnam–European Union relations
- China–Vietnam relations
- Russia–Vietnam relations
