= Embassy of the United States, Hanoi =

U.S. Embassy Hanoi
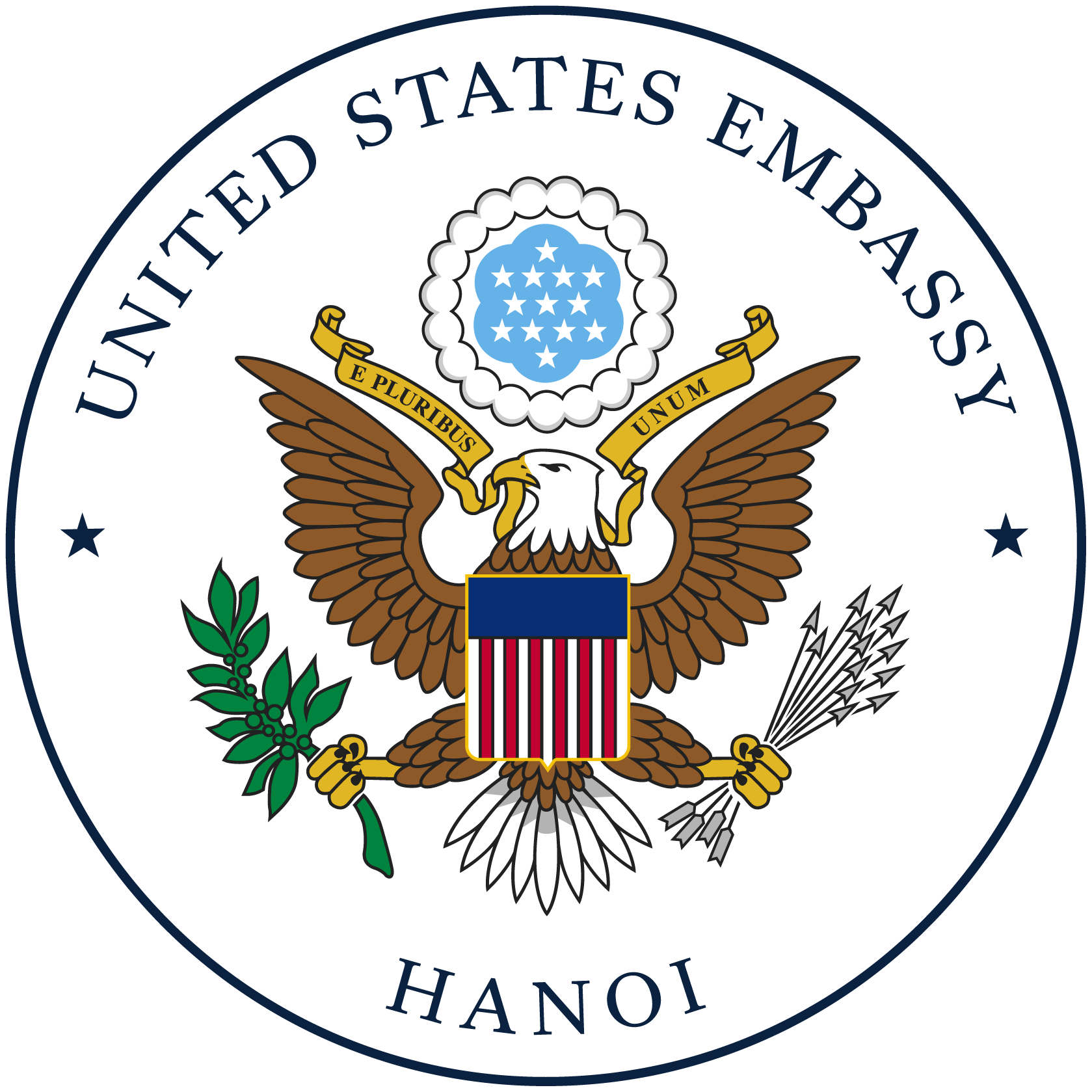
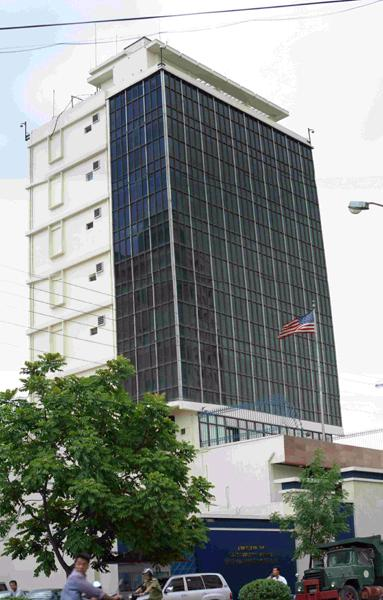
- Location: Hanoi, Vietnam
- Address: 7 Lang Ha Street, Hanoi, Vietnam
- Coordinates: 21°1′18″N 105°49′8″E
- Jurisdiction: Vietnam
- Website: vn.usembassy.gov

The U.S. Embassy in Hanoi (Đại sứ quán Hoa Kỳ tại Hà Nội), located in Hanoi, Vietnam, is the highest diplomatic representation of the United States in Vietnam.

== History ==
The United States Office for MIA Affairs officially opened in Hanoi on July 7, 1991, marking the first continuous presence of an official U.S. government agency in Vietnam since 1975. The U.S. Embassy in Hanoi was inaugurated on August 6, 1995, during Secretary of State Warren Christopher's visit. That same day, Vietnam also opened its embassy in Washington.

The American Center Hanoi, a public library with information about American people and culture, opened in 1997.

On July 23, 1998, the U.S. Senate voted in favor of continued funding for the U.S. Embassy in Hanoi, underpinning the ongoing cooperation on the Vietnam War POW/MIA issue. On November 19, 2000, the Office of the United States Agency for International Development (USAID) was inaugurated. In 2008, Ambassador Michael Michalak inaugurated the first American Center in Hanoi.

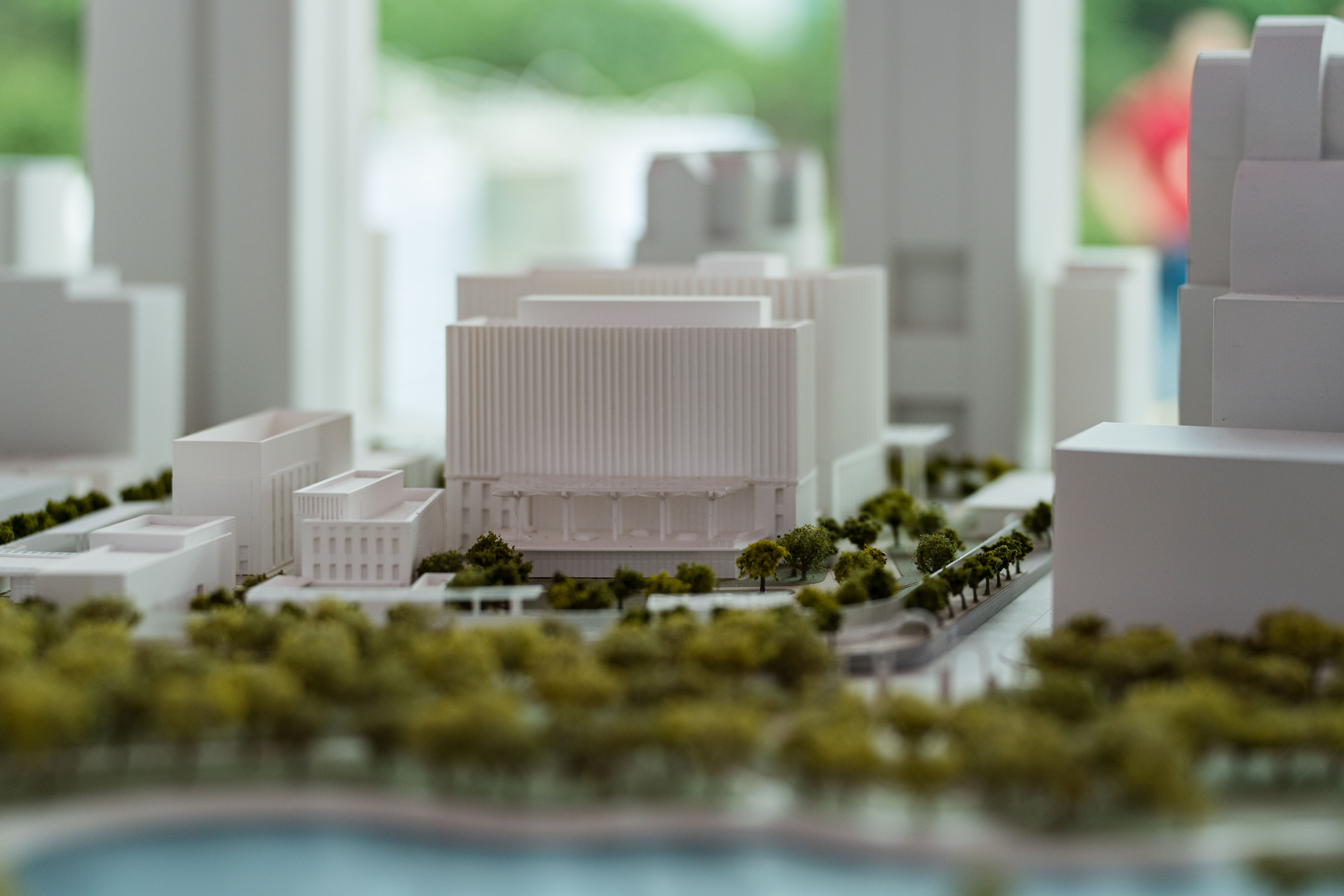
Model of the new embassy in Hanoi.

On April 14, 2023, U.S. Secretary of State Antony Blinken officiated a groundbreaking ceremony for a new $1.2 billion U.S. embassy compound in Hanoi. The embassy compound, spanning 3.2 hectares, will be located on Pham Van Bach Street in Cau Giay District and will be leased for 99 years.

Following the groundbreaking ceremony, China declined to reschedule a previously cancelled visit by Secretary Blinken. This decision was influenced by concerns related to the 2023 Chinese balloon incident. As the U.S. aims to fortify its coalition in South-east Asia to counteract China's influence, Vietnam navigates a precarious balance of fostering cooperation with Washington while maintaining amicable relations with Beijing, especially given the latter's growing military presence in the South China Sea and its strengthening ties with Moscow.

== See also ==
- United States–Vietnam relations
- List of diplomatic missions of the United States
- Consulate General of the United States, Ho Chi Minh City
