= Consulate General of the United States, Ho Chi Minh City =

U.S. Consulate General Ho Chi Minh City
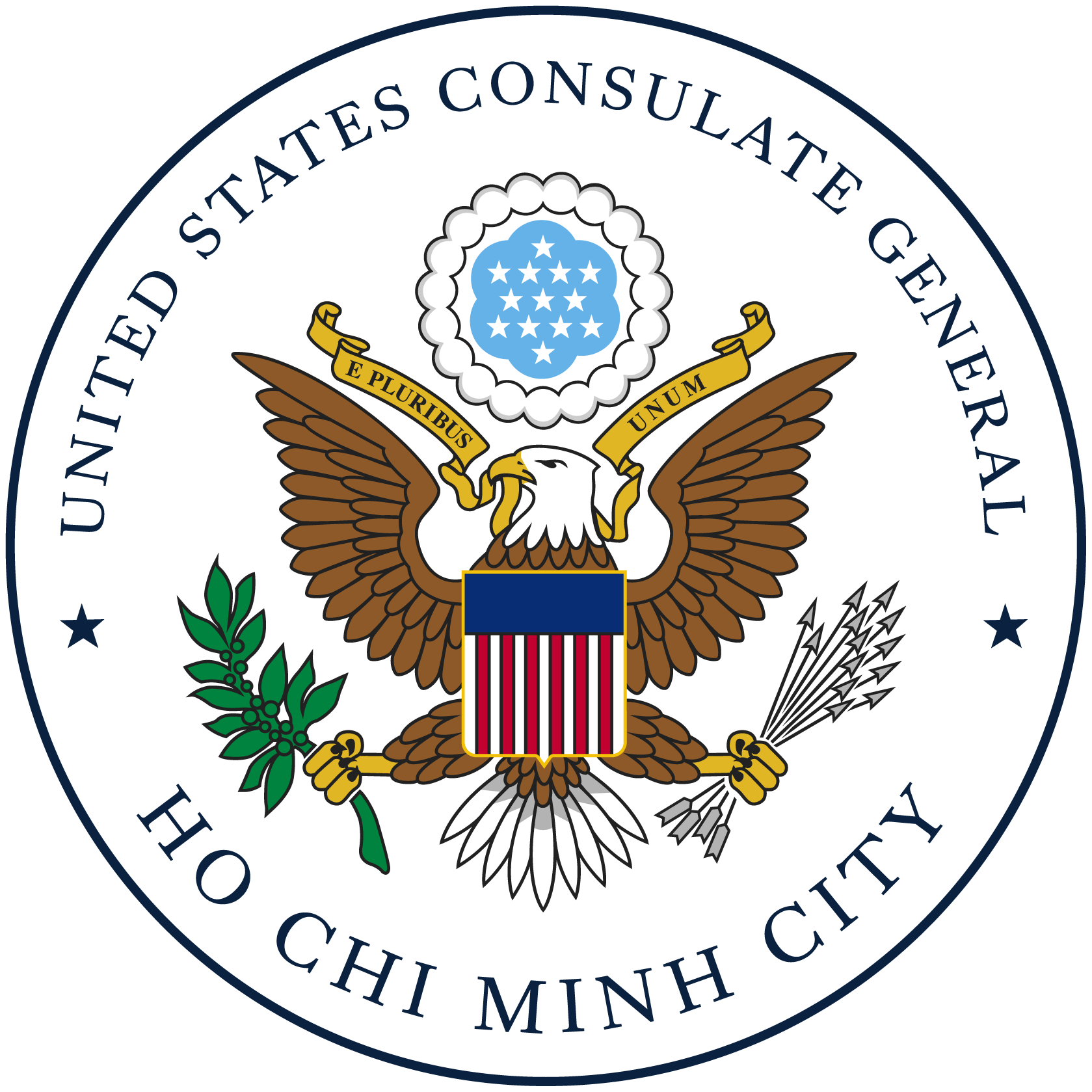
- Seal
- Location: Saigon, Ho Chi Minh City, Vietnam
- Address: 4 Le Duan Blvd, Saigon
- Opened: August 1999
- Consul General: Melissa A. Brown
- Website: vn.usembassy.gov/ho-chi-minh/

The U.S. Consulate General in Ho Chi Minh City (Tổng Lãnh sự quán Hoa Kỳ tại Thành phố Hồ Chí Minh) represents the interests of the United States government in Ho Chi Minh City (formerly known as Saigon), Vietnam. The consulate reports to the ambassador at the U.S. Embassy in Hanoi. Prior to the Reunification of Vietnam in 1975, its venue served as the U.S. Embassy Saigon, South Vietnam.

The Consulate General was dedicated in a ceremony on September 8, 1999 by US Secretary of State Madeleine Albright.

== See more ==
- Embassy of the United States, Hanoi
- List of diplomatic missions of the United States
