= Melissa A. Brown =

American diplomat

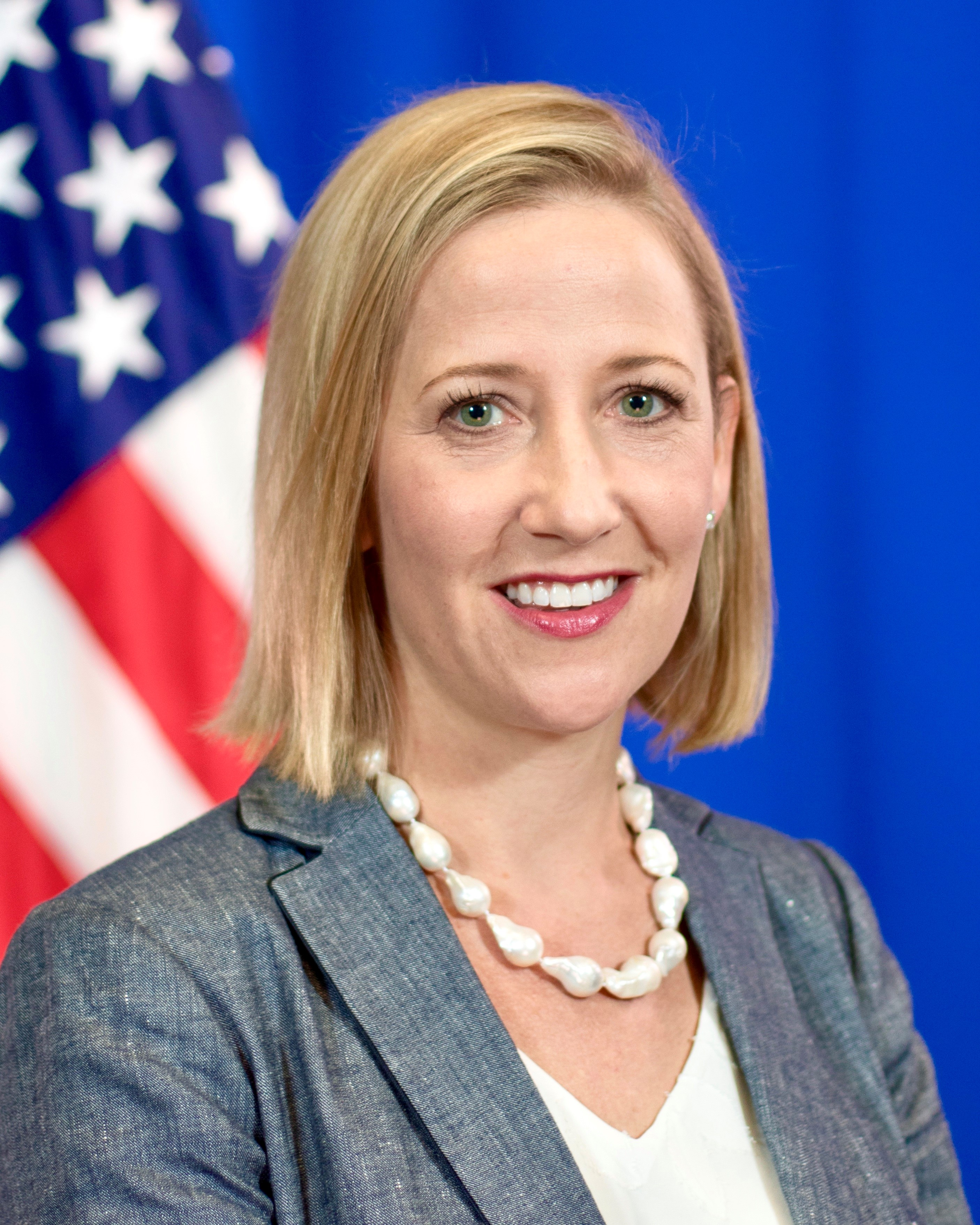
Ambassador Melissa Brown.

Melissa A. Brown is an American diplomat who is currently serving as U.S. Consul General in Ho Chi Minh City. She previously served Charge d’Affaires of the United States to the Association of Southeast Asian Nations from 2019 to 2021.

== Career ==
Brown graduated from Georgetown University's Edmund A. Walsh School of Foreign Service. She worked at the Embassy of the United States, Jakarta, among other postings.

In February 2022, she assumed the role of Deputy Assistant Secretary for Maritime and Mainland Southeast Asia. From September 2021 to February 2022, she served as the Deputy Assistant Secretary for Australia, New Zealand, and Pacific Islands and for Economic Policy, succeeding Sandra Oudkirk.

Melissa A. Brown assumed the role of Consul General at the U.S. Consulate General in Ho Chi Minh City, Vietnam, in August 2025.

== Personal life ==
Brown grew up in New Jersey and Jakarta, Indonesia.
