= List of aircraft losses of the Vietnam War =

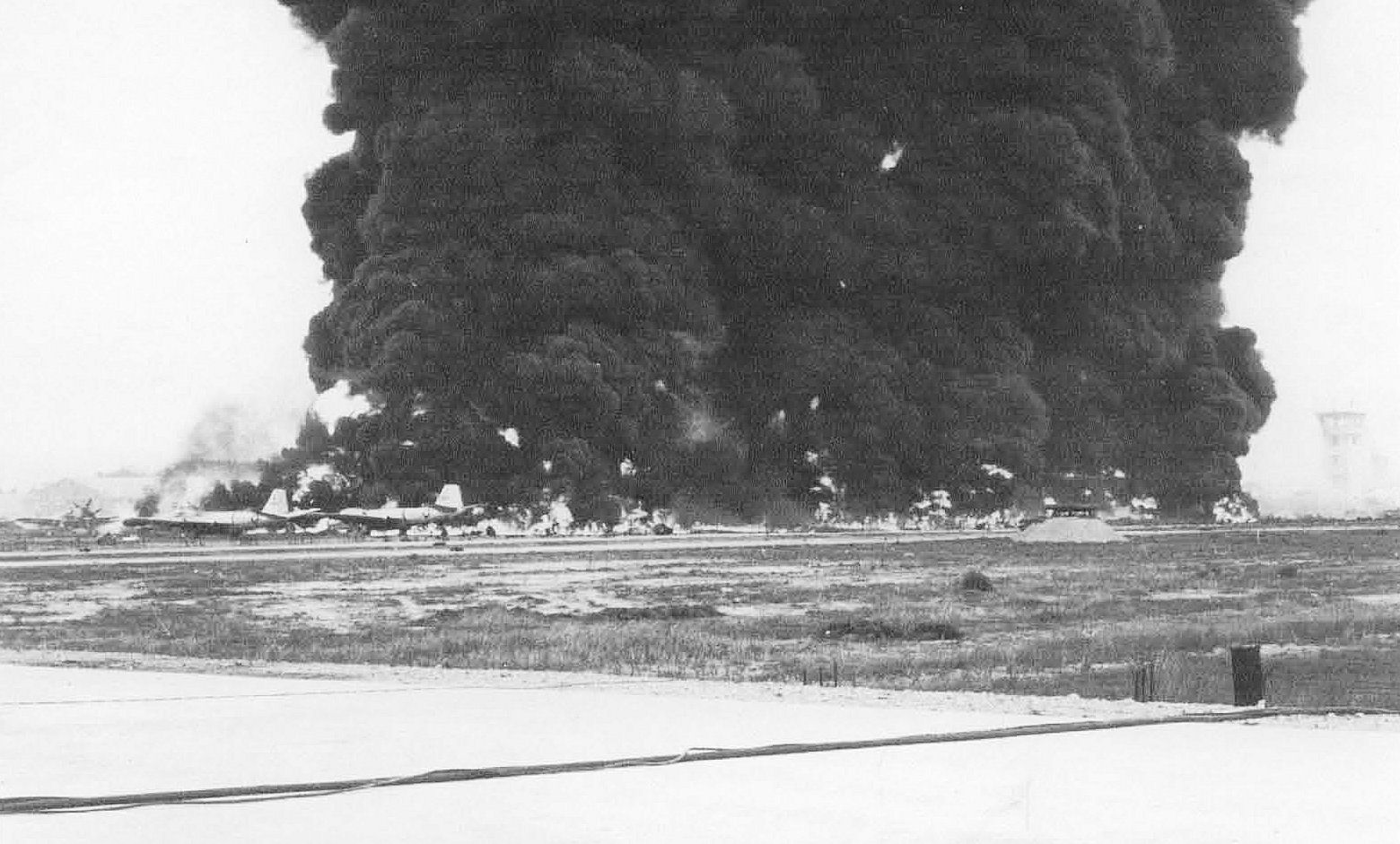
Burning American aircraft at Bien Hoa Air Base in 1965

During the Vietnam War, thousands of U.S. aircraft were lost to anti-aircraft artillery (AAA), surface-to-air missiles (SAMs), and fighter interceptors (MiG)s. The great majority of U.S. combat losses in all areas of Southeast Asia were to AAA. The Royal Australian Air Force also flew combat and airlift missions in South Vietnam, as did the South Vietnamese Republic of Vietnam Air Force (RVNAF). Among fixed-wing aircraft, more F-4 Phantoms were lost than any other type in service with any nation.

The United States lost 578 Ryan Model 147 Unmanned aerial vehicles (UAVs) (554 over Vietnam and 24 over China). More than 400 QH-50C/D UAVs were also lost.

There were about 11,846 U.S. helicopters that served in the Vietnam War. The U.S. records show 5,607 helicopter losses.

In total, the United States military lost almost 10,000 aircraft (3,744 planes, 5,607 helicopters and about 1,000 UAVs).

South Vietnam lost 1,018 aircraft and helicopters from January 1964 to September 1973. 877 Republic of Vietnam aircraft were captured at the end of the war in 1975. Of the 2,750 aircraft and helicopters received by South Vietnam, only about 308 survived (240 flew to Thailand or US warships and 68 returned to the United States).

In total, the US, South Vietnam and Australia lost about 12,800 aircraft, helicopters and UAVs.

North Vietnam lost 150 to 170 aircraft and helicopters.

== United States aircraft ==
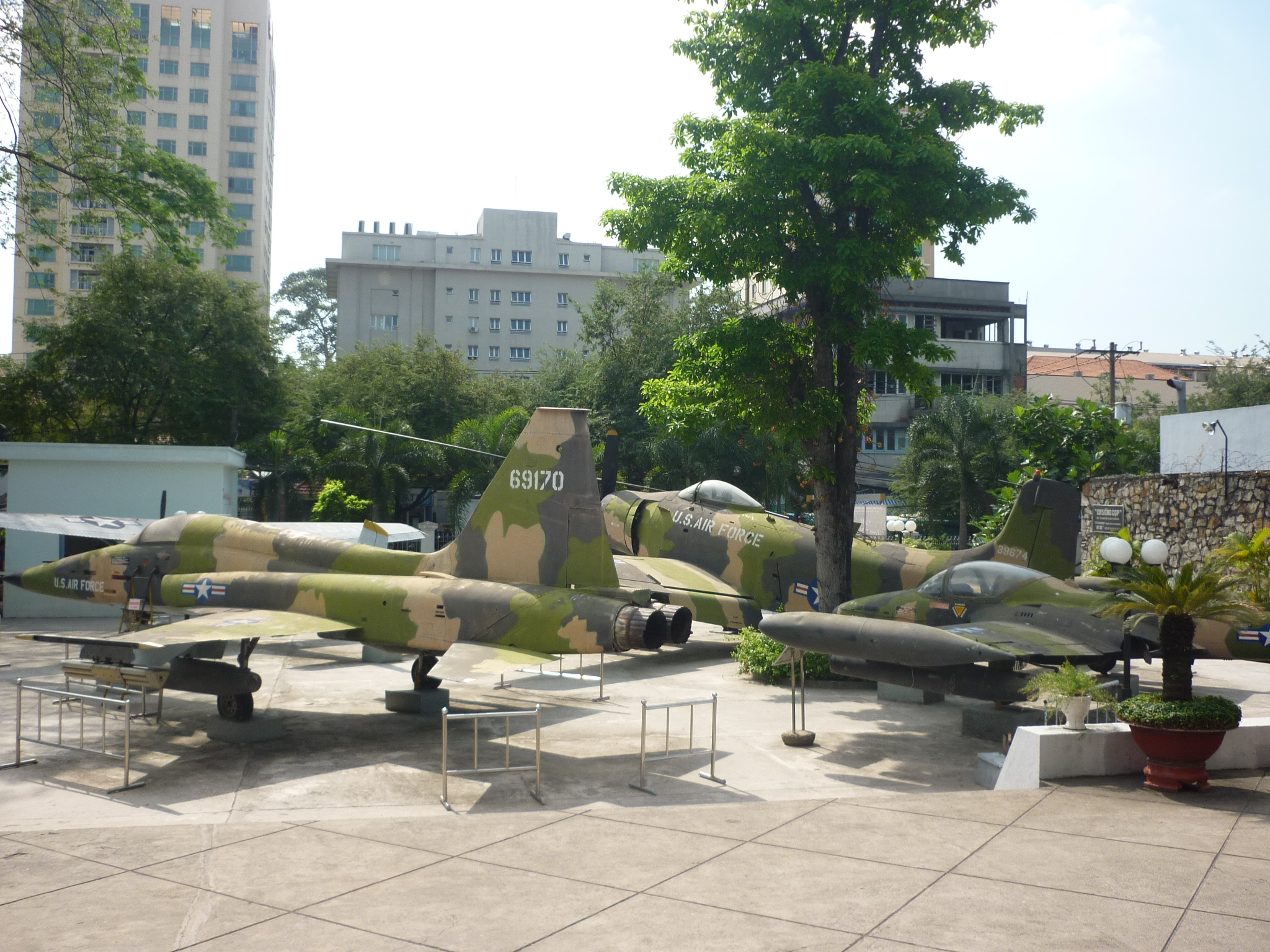
Captured American-made RVNAF warplanes in Saigon's War Remnants Museum

=== United States Air Force ===
All told, the U.S. Air Force flew 5.25 million sorties over South Vietnam, North Vietnam, northern and southern Laos, and Cambodia, losing 2,251 aircraft: 1,737 to hostile action, and 514 in accidents. A total of 2,197 of the losses were fixed-wing, and the remainder rotary-wing. The USAF sustained approximately 0.4 losses per 1,000 sorties during the conflict, which compared favorably with a 2.0 rate in Korea and a 9.7 figure during World War II.

==== USAF fixed-wing ====
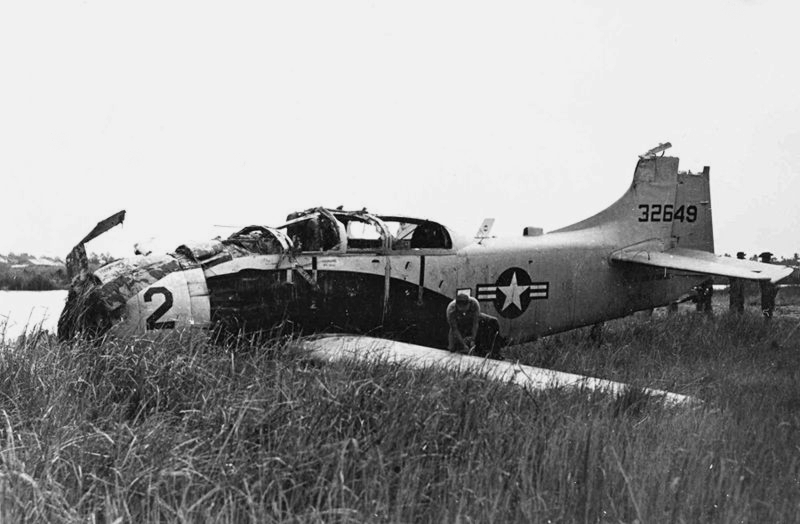
Downed USAF Douglas A-1E, pilot was later awarded the Medal of Honor

- A-1 Skyraider—191 total, 150 in combat
  - First loss: A-1E 52-132465 (1st Air Commando Squadron [ACS], 34th Tactical Group [TG]) shot down during night training mission on 29 August 1964 near Bien Hoa, SVN (Capt Richard Dean Goss KIA, one RVNAF observer [name unknown] KIA)
  - Final loss: A-1H 52-139738 (1st Special Operations Squadron, 56th Special Operations Wing) which was shot down 28 September 1972 (pilot was rescued by an Air America helicopter)
- A-7D Corsair II six total, four in combat
  - First loss: 71–0310 (355th Tactical Fighter Squadron, 354th TFW) on 2 December 1972 shot down on a CSAR mission in Laos (Capt Anthony Shine KIA)
  - Final loss: 70–0945 (354th TFW) shot down in Cambodia on 25 May 1973 (Capt Jeremiah Costello KIA)
- A-26 Invader—22 total
  - First loss: B-26B 44-35530 (Detachment 2A, 1st ACG) shot down in IV CTZ on the night of 4–5 November 1962, killing the three crew
  - Final loss: A-26A 64-17646 (609th SOS, 56th SOW) lost over Laos on the night of 7–8 July 1969, killing both crewmen
- A-37 Dragonfly—22 total
  - First loss: 1967, final loss: 1972

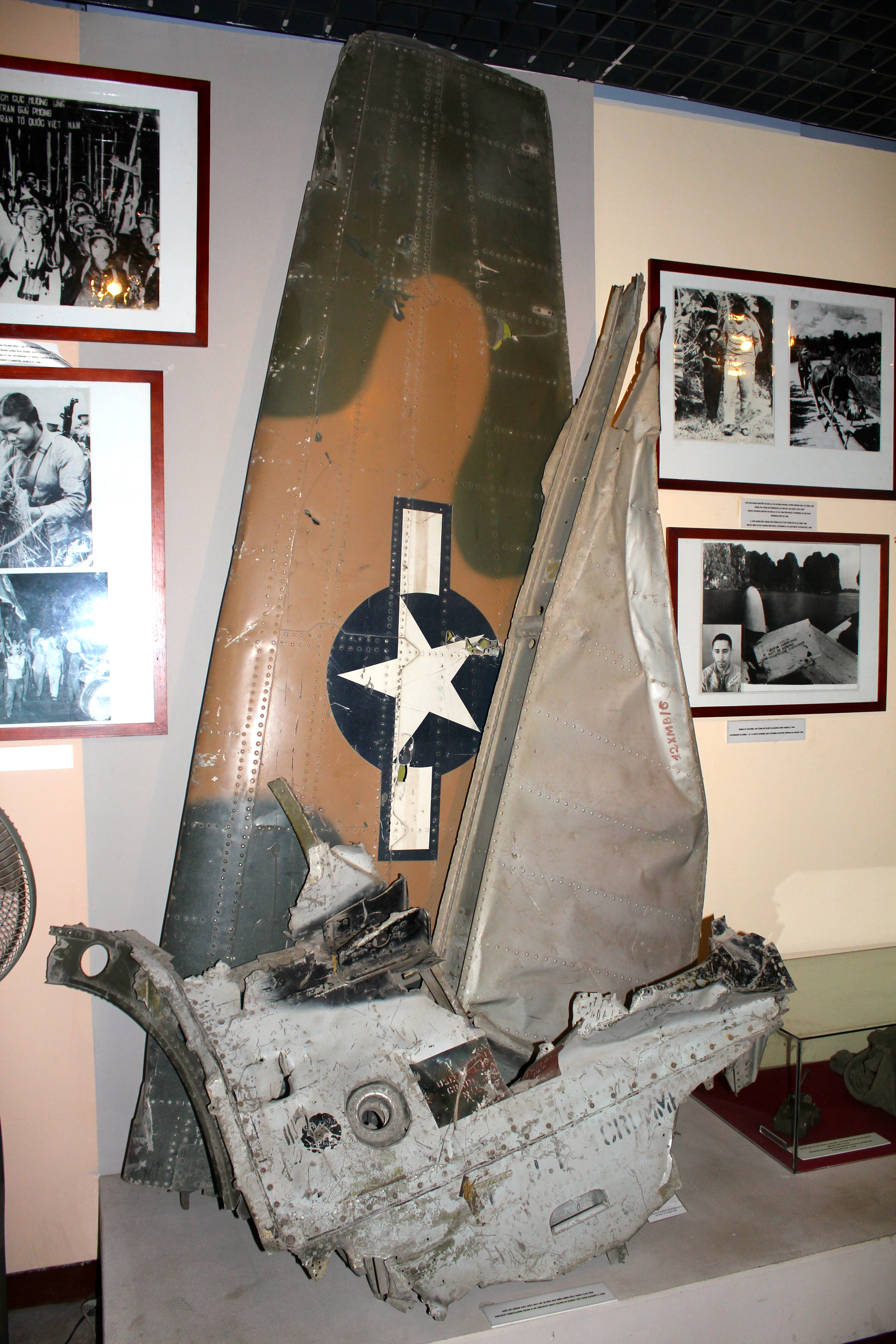
Wing of downed USAF warplane at the Vietnam Military History Museum

- AC-47 Spooky—19 total, 12 in combat
  - First loss: 1965, final loss: 1969
- AC-119 Shadow/Stinger—six total, two in combat
  - First loss: AC-119G 52-5907 (Det.1, 17th SOS, 14th SOW) which crashed on take-off from Tan Son Nhut, SVN, on 11 October 1969, killing six of 10 crewmen
  - Final loss: AC-119K 53-7826 (18th SOS, 56th SOW out of Bien Hoa AB), shot down by 37mm flak over An Lộc, SVN, on 2 May 1972, seven survivors of 10 crewmen
- AC-130 Spectre—six total, all in combat
  - First loss: AC-130A 54-1629 (16th SOS, 8th TFW) hit by 37mm anti-aircraft gun over Laos and crash-landed at Ubon RTAFB, two crewmen died (one died of injuries before reaching Ubon) but 11 others survived
  - Final loss: 1972

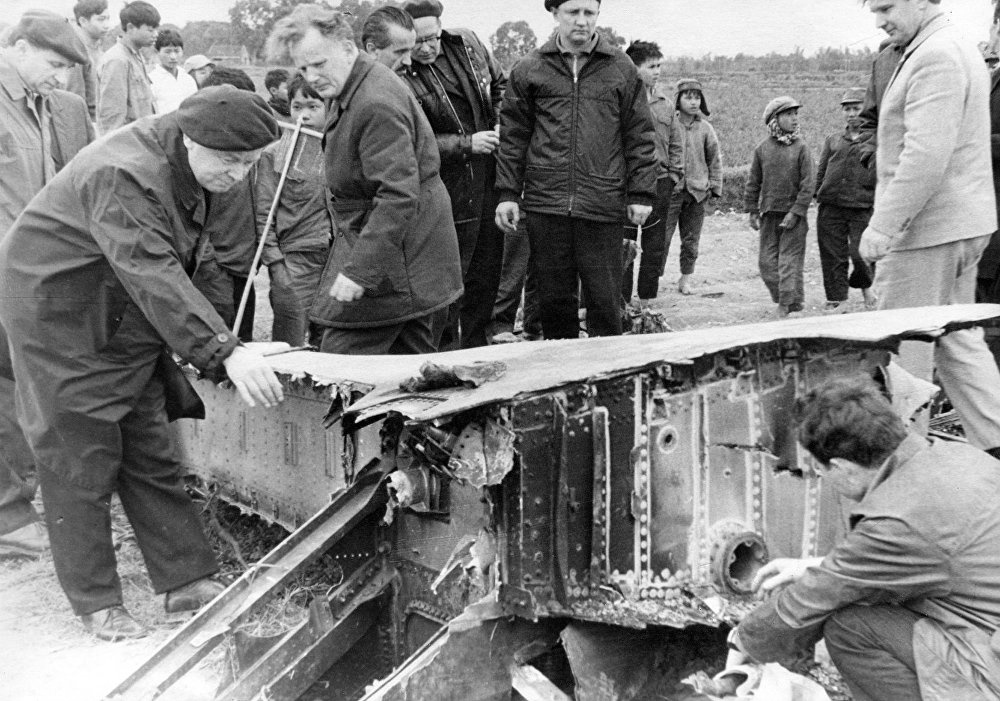
Soviet specialists inspect the wreckage of the B-52 Stratofortress which was shot down near Hanoi on 23 December 1972.

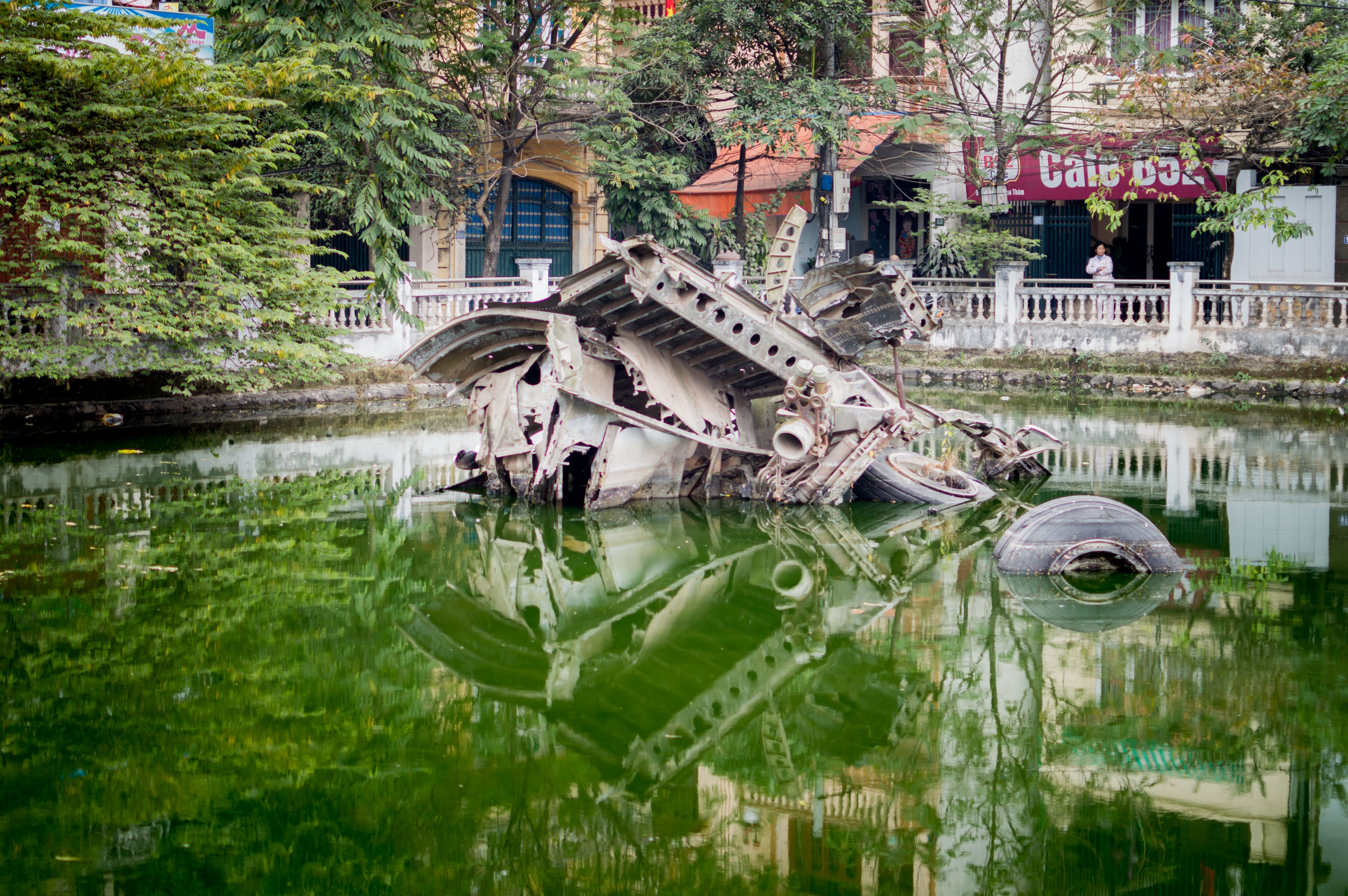
The wreckage of a US Air force B-52 Stratofortress, shot down over Hanoi in 1972.

- B-52 Stratofortress—31 total (17 in combat, two more being scrapped after sustaining battle damage, and 12 crashed in flight accidents)
  - First losses were operational (non-combat) mid-air collision two B-52F 57-0047 and 57-0179 (441st Bomb Squadron, 320th Bomb Wing), 18 June 1965, South China Sea during air refueling orbit, eight of 12 crewmen killed
  - Final loss: B-52D 55-0056 (307th Bomb Wing Provisional) to SAM 4 January 1973, crew rescued from Gulf of Tonkin
- B-57 Canberra—56 total, 38 in combat
  - First loss: 1964, final loss: 1970
- C-5A Galaxy—one total, 0 in combat
  - Crashed while attempting emergency landing at Tan Son Nhut AB 4 April 1975, as part of Operation Babylift.
- C-7 Caribou—19 total, 9 in combat
  - First loss: C-7B 62-4161 (459th Tactical Airlift Squadron, 483d Tactical Airlift Wing) which was hit by a US 155mm shell on 3 August 1967 in SVN killing the three crewmen. Note: there were two fatal crashes during Operation Red Leaf transition training of USAF crews in Army CV-2's, on 4 and 28 October 1966.
  - Final loss: C-7B 62-12584 (483d TAW) which crashed in SVN on 13 January 1971, all four crewmen survived.
- C-47 Skytrain—21 total
  - A C-47 was the very first USAF aircraft lost in the SEA conflict, C-47B 44-76330 (315th Air Division) on TDY at Vientiane, Laos which was shot down by the Pathet Lao on 23 March 1961 killing seven of the eight crewmen. The sole survivor, US Army Maj. Lawrence Bailey was captured and held until August 1962.
  - Final loss: EC-47Q 43-48636 (361st Tactical Electronic Warfare Squadron, 56th SOW) shot down in Laos on the night of 04/5 4–5 February 1973, killing all eight crewmen.
- C-123 Provider—53 total, 21 in combat
  - First loss: C-123B 56-4370 attached to the 464th TAW which came down on an Operation Ranch Hand (defoliation) training flight between Bien Hoa and Vung Tau, SVN on 2 February 1962
  - Final loss: 1971

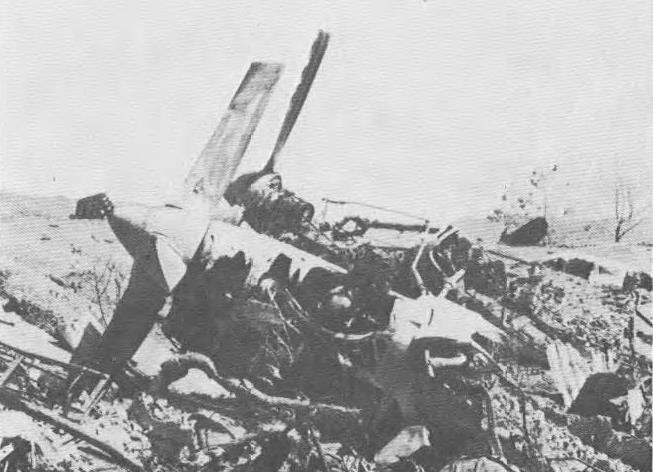
Wreckage of downed C-130 Hercules

- C-130 Hercules—55 total, 34 in combat
  - First loss: C-130A 57-0475 (817th Troop Carrier Squadron, 6315th Operations Group) on 24 April 1965, a Blind Bat flareship that crashed into high ground near Korat Royal Thai Air Force Base, Thailand, attempting to land in bad weather with a heavy load, two engine failures, and low fuel, killing all six crewmen. This was the 14th recorded loss of a C-130 to all causes.
  - Final loss: C-130E 72-1297 (314th TAW) destroyed by rocket fire at Tan Son Nhut AB on 28 April 1975.
- C-141 Starlifter—2 total, 0 in combat
  - First loss: C-141A 65-9407 (62d Military Airlift Wing) destroyed in a night runway collision with a USMC A-6 at Danang, SVN on 23 March 1967 killing 5 of the 6 crewmen.
  - Final loss: C-141A 66-0127 (4th Military Airlift Squadron, 62d MAW) crashed soon after take-off from Cam Ranh Bay, SVN on 13 April 1967 killing 6 of the 8-man crew.
- E/RB-66 Destroyer—14 total
  - First loss: RB-66B 53-0452 (Det 1, 41st Tactical Reconnaissance Squadron, 6250th Combat Support Group) which crashed 22–23 October 1965 west of Pleiku, SVN killing the crew.
  - Final loss: EB-66B 42nd TEWS, 388th TFS lost to engine failure on 23 December 1972 during Operation Linebacker II. A total of 3 crewmen were KIA.
- EC-121 BatCat—2 total, 0 combat
  - First loss: EC-121R 67-24193 (554th Reconnaissance Squadron, 553d RW) crashed 25 April 1969 on take-off in a thunderstorm from Korat RTAFB, killing all 18 crewmen.
  - Final loss: EC-121R 67-21495 (554th RS) crashed on approach to Korat RTAFB on 6 September 1969, 4 of the 16 men were killed.
- F-4 Phantom II—445 total, 382 in combat
  - First loss: operational (non-combat), F-4C 64-0674 (45TH TFS, 15th TFW) which ran out of fuel after strike in SVN on 9 June 1965; first combat loss F-4C 64-0685 (45th TFS, 15th TFW) shot down Ta Chan, NW NVN on 20 June 1965. A total of 9 of the losses were parked aircraft struck by rockets.
  - Final loss: F-4D 66-8747 (432d TRW) on 29 June 1973.
- F-5 Freedom Fighter—9 total
  - First loss: 1965, final loss: 1967
- F-100 Super Sabre—243 total, 198 in combat
  - First loss: 1964, final loss: 1971
- F-102 Delta Dagger—14 total, 7 in combat
  - First loss: 1964, final loss: 1967. A total of 4 of the combat losses were parked aircraft.
- F-104 Starfighter—14 total, 9 in combat
  - First loss: 56–0937 (476th TFS, 497th TFW) shot down by enemy ground fire during CAS mission near Tri Dao, Vietnam, on 29 June 1965, pilot Capt. R. Cole rescued
  - Final loss: 57-0922 (435th TFS, 8th TFW) operational loss due to engine failure on 14 May 1967 in Thailand, pilot name unknown, survived

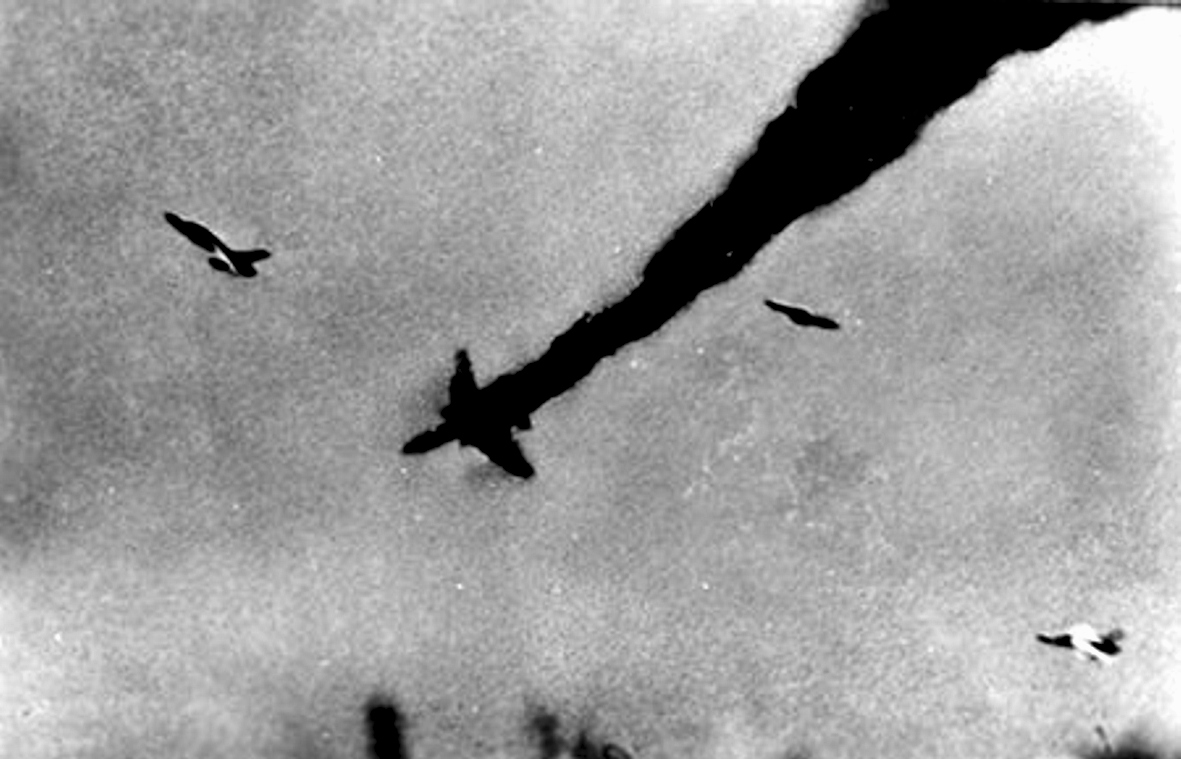
A U.S. Air Force F-105D Thunderchief shot down

- F-105D Thunderchief—335 total, 283 in combat
  - First loss: 62–4371 (36th TFS, 6441st TFW) written off from battle damage over Laos 14 August 1964, at Korat, Thailand
  - Final loss: 61–0153 (44th TFS, 355th TFW) shot down Laos 23 September 1970, pilot Capt. J. W. Newhouse rescued
- F-105F/G Thunderchief—47 total, 37 combat
  - First loss: EF-105F 63-8286 (13th TFS, 388th TFW) shot down by AAA RP-6 July 1966, Maj. Roosevelt Hestle and Capt. Charles Morgan KIA
  - Final loss: F-105G 63-8359 (Det.1 561st TFS, 388th TFW) shot down by SAM 16 November 1972, RP-3, crew rescued
- F-111A Aardvark—11 total, 6 in combat
  - First loss: mission-related TFR failure, 66-0022 (428th TFS 474th TFW, Project Combat Lancer), 28 March 1968, Maj. H.E. Mccann and Capt. D.L. Graham MIA
  - Final loss: 67–0111 (474th TFW) mid-air collision over Cambodia, 16 June 1973, both crewmen rescued
- HU-16 Albatross—4 total, 2 in combat
  - First loss: 51–5287 to unknown cause 19 June 1965
  - 51–0058 to unknown cause, 3 July 1965
  - 51-0071 (33d ARRS) shot down by AAA 14 March 1966, two crewmen killed
  - Final loss: 51-7145 (37th ARRS) disappeared 18 October 1966, 7 crewmen KIA-BNR
- KB-50 Superfortress tanker—1 total, 0 combat
  - Only loss: KB-50J 48-0065 (421st Air Refueling Squadron Detachment) at Takhli RTAFB which crashed in Thailand on 14 October 1964, all 6 crewmen survived
- KC-135 Stratotanker—3 total, 0 combat
  - Two crashes in 1968, one 1969, all operational (non-combat)
- O-1 Bird Dog—172 total, 122 in combat
  - First loss: 1963
  - Final loss: 1972
- O-2 Skymaster—104 total, 82 in combat
  - First loss: 1967
  - Final loss: 1972
- OV-10 Bronco—63 total, 47 in combat
  - First loss: 1968
  - Final loss: 1973
- QU-22 Pave Eagle—8 lost, 7 in combat
  - First loss: YQU-22A 68-10531 (554th RS, 553d RW) crashed due to engine failure on 11 June 1969
  - Final loss: QU-22B 70-1546 (554th RS) on 25 August 1972, pilot killed
- RF-4C Phantom II—83 total, 76 in combat
  - First loss: 1966
  - Final loss: 1972

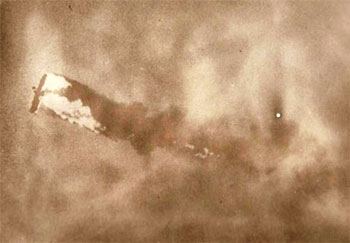
A U.S. aircraft shot down over North Vietnam, 1968

- RF-101 Voodoo—39 total, 33 in combat
  - First loss: 1964
  - Final loss: 1968
- SR-71A Blackbird—2 total, 0 combat
  - First loss: 64-17969 (Det OL-8, 9th Strategic Reconnaissance Wing) suffered engine failure over Thailand on 10 May 1970, both crewmen ejected safely
  - Final loss: 64-17978 (Det OL-KA, 9th SRW) crashed on landing at Kadena, Okinawa on 20 July 1972, both crewmen survived
- T-28 Trojan—23 total
  - First loss: 1962
  - Final loss: 1968
- U-2C "Dragon Lady"—1 total, 0 combat
  - Only loss: 56–6690 (349th Strategic Reconnaissance Squadron 100th SRW) which crashed on 8 October 1966 near Bien Hoa, SVN, Maj. Leo J Stewart ejected and was rescued
- U-3B Blue Canoe—1 total, 1 in combat
  - Only loss: 60–6058, destroyed on the ground during a VC attack on Tan Son Nhut, SVN on 14 June 1968.
- U-6A Beaver—1 total, 0 in combat
  - Only loss: 51-15565 (432d Tactical Reconnaissance Wing) which crashed in Thailand 28 December 1966, both crewmen survived
- U-10D Courier—1 total, 1 in combat
  - Only loss: 63-13102 (5th SOS, 14th SOW) shot down 14 August 1969 near Bien Hoa, killing 1/Lt Roger Brown

==== USAF rotary-wing ====
- CH/HH-3 Jolly Green Giant—34 total, 25 in combat
  - First loss: CH-3E 63-9685 (38th ARRS) to AAA North Vietnam on 6 November 1965, three crewmen POW, one rescued
  - Final loss: HH-3E 65-12785 (37th ARRS) 21 November 1970, combat-assaulted inside Son Tay POW camp (Operation Ivory Coast) and deliberately destroyed by U.S. Special Forces
- HH-43B Pedro—13 lost, 8 in combat
  - First loss: 63–9713 (38th ARRS) damaged by fire 2 June 1965, crew rescued and aircraft destroyed to prevent its capture
  - Final loss: 60–0282 (38th ARRS) crashed Cam Ranh Bay 7 August 1969, crew rescued
- CH/HH-53 Super Jolly—27 total, 17 in combat
  - First loss: HH-53C 66-14430 (40th ARRS) in Laos, damaged by gunfire 18 January 1969 crew rescued and aircraft destroyed by bombing to prevent capture
  - Last losses: four CH-53s (68–10925, −10926, −10927, 70–1627, all from 21st SOS, 56th SOW) to AAA on 15 May 1975, Koh Tang, Kampuchea, (Mayaguez incident final aircraft losses of Vietnam War)
- UH-1 Iroquois—36 total

=== United States Navy ===
Twenty-one aircraft carriers conducted 86 war cruises and operated 9,178 total days on the line in the Gulf of Tonkin. 532 aircraft were lost in combat and 329 more to operational causes, resulting in the deaths of 401 naval aviators, with 64 airmen reported missing and 179 taken prisoner of war.

==== USN fixed-wing carrier-based ====
- A-1 Skyraider—65 total, 48 in combat
  - First loss: A-1H 139760 (VA-145, USS Constellation), to AAA 5 August 1964, Lt.j.g. R. C. Sather KIA (body recovered in 1985)
  - Final loss: A-1H 134499 (VA-25, USS Coral Sea), to MiG 15 February 1968, Lt.j.g. J.P. Dunn KIA
- A-3 Skywarrior—7 total, 2 in combat
  - First loss: A-3B 142250 (VAH-4, USS Hancock), operational loss (non-combat) 22 December 1964, 3 rescued, 1 killed
  - Final loss: A-3B 144627 (VAH-4, USS Kitty Hawk), AAA 8 March 1967, 3 crewmen KIA

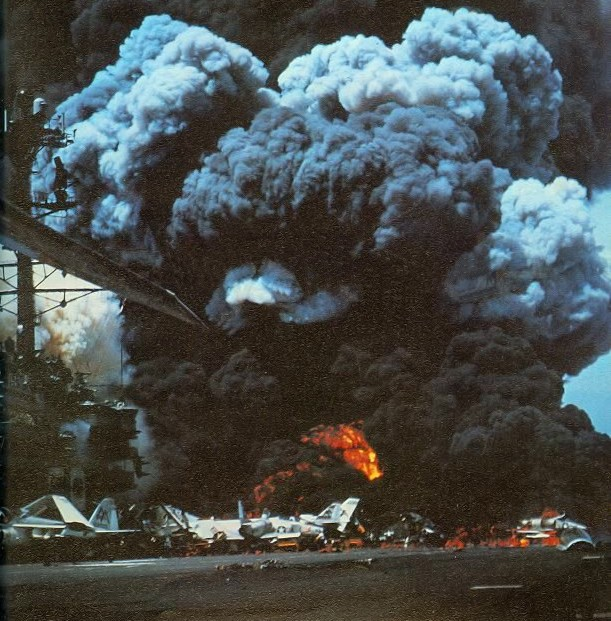
1967 USS Forrestal fire

- A-4 Skyhawk—282 total, 195 in combat
  - First loss: A-4C 149578 (VA-144, USS Constellation), AAA 5 August 1964, Lt.j.g. Everett Alvarez POW (second longest held prisoner)
  - Final loss: A-4F 155021 (VA-212, USS Hancock), AAA 6 September 1972, pilot rescued
- A-6 Intruder—62 total, 51 in combat
  - First loss: A-6A 151584 (VA-75, USS Independence), own bomb detonation Laos 14 July 1965, crew rescued
  - Final loss: A-6A 157007 (VA-35, USS America), AAA South Vietnam 24 January 1973, crew rescued
- A-7 Corsair—100 total, 55 in combat
  - First loss: A-7A 153239 (VA-147, USS Ranger), SAM North Vietnam 22 December 1967, LCdr J.M. Hickerson POW
  - Final loss: A-7E 156837 (VA-147, USS Constellation), operational loss (non-combat) 29 January 1973, pilot missing
  - Operation Frequent Wind loss—"The Enterprise flew 95 sorties in support of the operation, but on no occasion was any ordnance used in anger, although an A-7E was lost to undetermined causes". The pilot was rescued at sea.
- C-1 Trader—4 total, 0 in combat
  - First loss: C-1A 146047 (VR-21, USS Independence), non-combat 30 August 1965, 7 passengers and crew rescued
  - C-1A 136784 (VR-21, USS Independence), operational loss (non-combat) 12 September 1965, 9 passengers and crew rescued, 1 killed
  - C-1A 146016 (Composite Squadron Five VC-5), operational loss (non-combat) 8 August 1967, 3 passengers and 2 crew rescued
  - Final loss: C-1A 146054 (Carrier Air Wing 11, USS Kitty Hawk), operational loss (non-combat) 16 January 1968, 7 passengers and crew rescued, 3 killed
- C-2 Greyhound—2 total, 0 in combat
  - First loss: C-2A 152796 (VRC-50, USS Constellation), Gulf of Tonkin crash 2 October 1969, 26 passengers and crew killed
  - Final loss: C-2A 152793 (VRC-50, USS Ranger), Gulf of Tonkin crash 15 December 1970, 3 crew killed
- E-1 Tracer—3 total, 0 in combat
  - First loss: E-1B 148918 (VAW-12, USS Independence), operational loss (non-combat) 22 September 1965, crew rescued
  - Final loss: E-1B 148132 (VAW-111, USS Oriskany), operational loss (non-combat) 8 October 1967, 5 crewmen killed
- E-2 Hawkeye—2 total, 0 in combat
  - First loss: E-2A 151711 (VAW-116, USS Coral Sea), 8 April 1970, 5 crewmen killed
  - Final loss: E-2B 151719 (VAW-115, USS Midway), 11 June 1971, 5 crewmen missing
- EKA-3 Skywarrior—2 lost, 0 in combat
  - First loss: EKA-3B 142400 (VAQ-132, USS America), operational loss (non-combat) 4 July 1970, 3 rescued
  - Final loss: EKA-3B 142634 (VAQ-130, USS Ranger), operational loss (non-combat) 21 January 1973, 3 crewmen killed
- EA-1 Skyraider—4 total, 1 in combat
  - First loss: EA-1E 139603 (VAW-111, USS Yorktown), operational loss (non-combat) 15 April 1965, crew rescued
  - Final loss: EA-1F 132543 (VAW-13, USS Franklin D. Roosevelt), operational loss (non-combat) 10 September 1966, crew rescued

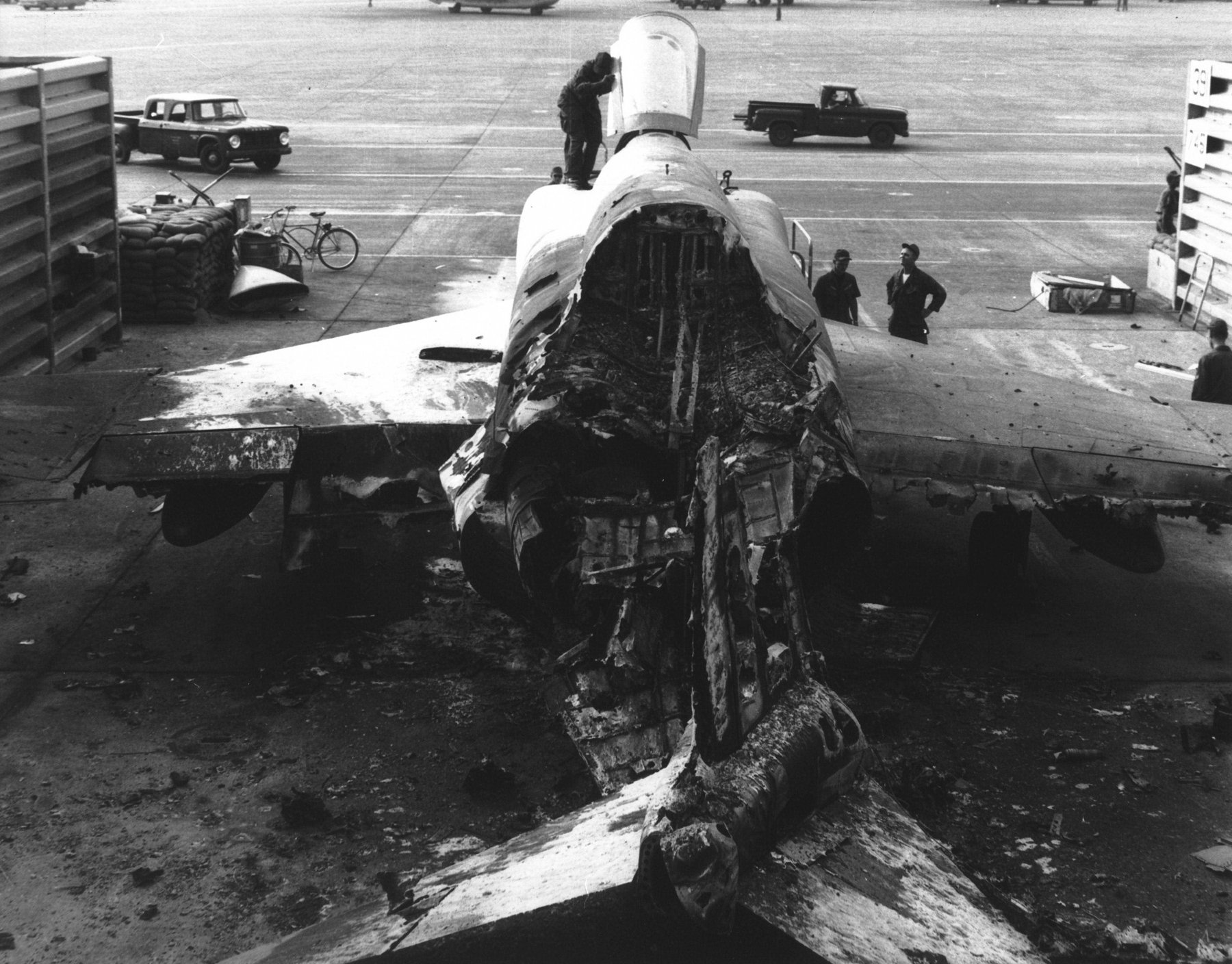
USAF F-4 Phantom II destroyed during the Tet Offensive

- F-4 Phantom—138 total, 75 in combat
  - First loss: F-4B 151412 (VA-142, USS Constellation), operational loss (non-combat) 13 November 1964, crew rescued
  - Final combat loss (also last USN combat loss of war): F-4J 155768 (VF-143, USS Enterprise), AAA South Vietnam 27 January 1973, Cdr H.H. Hall (MIA) and LCdr P.A. Kientzler (POW)
  - Final loss: F-4J 158361 (VF-21, USS Ranger), operational loss (non-combat) 29 January 1973, crew killed
- F-8 Crusader—118 total, 57 in combat
  - First loss: F-8D (VF-111, USS Kitty Hawk), to AAA over Laos 7 June 1964, LCdr C.D. Lynn rescued
  - Final loss: (operational) F-8J 150887 (VF-191, USS Oriskany) 26 November 1972, pilot rescued
- KA-3 Skywarrior—2 lost, 0 in combat
  - First loss: KA-3B 142658 (VAH-4, USS Oriskany), operational loss (non-combat) 28 July 1967, 1 crewmen rescued, 2 killed
  - Final loss: KA-3B 138943 (VAH-10, USS Coral Sea), operational loss (non-combat) 17 February 1969, 3 crewmen killed

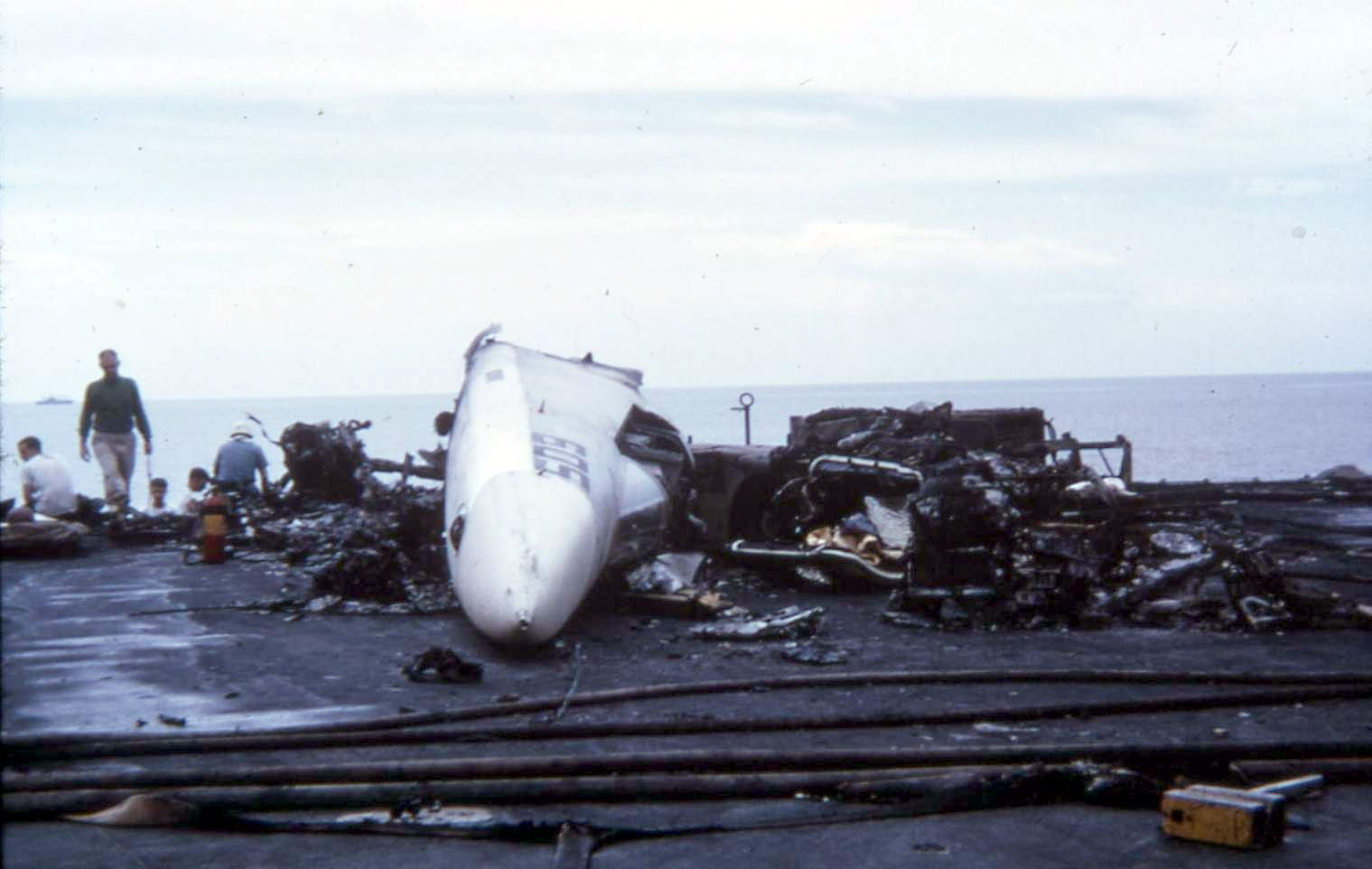
A-5 Vigilante destroyed in the USS Forrestal fire

- RA-5 Vigilante—27 total, 18 in combat
  - First loss: RA-5C 149306 (RVAH-5, USS Ranger), operational loss (non-combat) 9 December 1965, 2 crewmen killed
  - Final loss: RA-5C 156633 (RVAH-13, USS Enterprise), to MiG-21 North Vietnam 28 December 1972, Lcdr A.H. Agnew POW, Lt. M.F. Haifley KIA
- RF-8 Crusader—29 total, 19 in combat
  - First loss: RF-8A (Det. C VFP-63, USS Kitty Hawk), 6 June 1964, to AAA in Laos, Lt. C. F. Klusmann POW
  - Final loss: RF-8G 144608 (VFP-63, USS Oriskany), operational loss (non-combat) 13 December 1972, pilot rescued
- S-2 Tracker—5 total, 3 in combat
  - First loss: S-2D 149252 (VS-35, USS Hornet), unknown combat loss 21 January 1966, 4 crewmen missing
  - Final loss: S-2E (VS-23, USS Yorktown), unknown combat loss 17 March 1968, 4 crewmen KIA

==== USN rotary-wing ====
- SH-2/UH-2 Sea Sprite—12 lost, 0 in combat
  - First loss: UH-2A 149751 (HC-1, USS Hancock), operational loss (non-combat) 10 January 1966, 4 crewmen rescued
  - Final loss: UH-2C 149767 (HC-1, USS Bon Homme Richard), operational loss (non-combat) 10 August 1969, 4 crewmen rescued
- SH-3 Sea King—20 lost, 8 in combat
  - First loss: SH-3A 148993 (HS-2, USS Hornet), AAA North Vietnam 13 November 1965, 4 crewmen rescued
  - Final loss: SH-3D 156494 (HS-7, USS Saratoga), operational loss (non-combat) 31 December 1972, crew rescued

==== USN fixed-wing land-based ====
- OV-10 Bronco—7 total, 6 in combat
  - First VAL-4 loss: 155490 was shot down the night of 12 July 1969. Crash Location: Near Ap Bac, Chau Doc Province, South Vietnam. Both Aircrew members were Killed In-Action
  - Last VAL-4 loss: 155461 crashed on 9 February 1972. Crash Location: Into Sea off southwest coast of Vietnam near Rach Gia and Ca Mau. Pilot was Killed In-Action, Copilot ejected and was Wounded In-Action
- P-3B Orion – 2 lost
  - First loss: P3-B 153440 (VP-26, U-Tapao), AAA South Vietnam, 6 February 1968, 12 crewmen KIA
  - Final loss: P3-B 153445 (VP-26, U-Tapao), possible AAA South Vietnam, 1 April 1968, 12 crewmen KIA

=== United States Marine Corps ===
U.S. Marine Corps aircraft lost in combat included 193 fixed-wing and 270 rotary-wing aircraft.

==== USMC fixed-wing ====
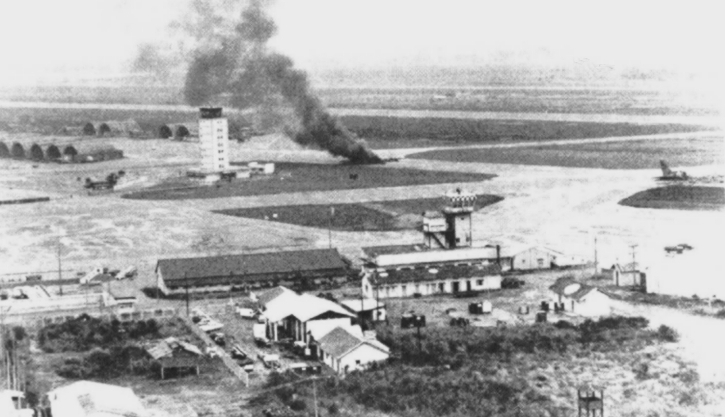
Burning VNAF C-130 Hercules

- A-4 Skyhawk—81 lost
- A-6 Intruder—25 lost+
- C-117 Skytrain—2 lost
- EA-6A Intruder—2 lost
- EF-10 Skynight—5 lost
- F-4 Phantom—95 lost, 72 combat
- F-8 Crusader—21 lost
- KC-130 Hercules—4 lost
- O-1 Bird Dog—7 lost
- OV-10 Bronco—10 lost

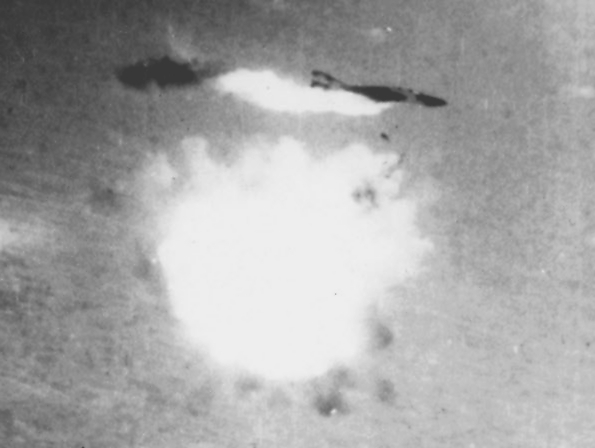
RF-4 explodes after being hit by SA-2 missile.

- RF-4 Phantom—4 lost
- RF-8 Crusader—1 lost
- TA-4 Skyhawk—10 lost
- TF-9 Cougar—1 lost

==== USMC rotary-wing ====
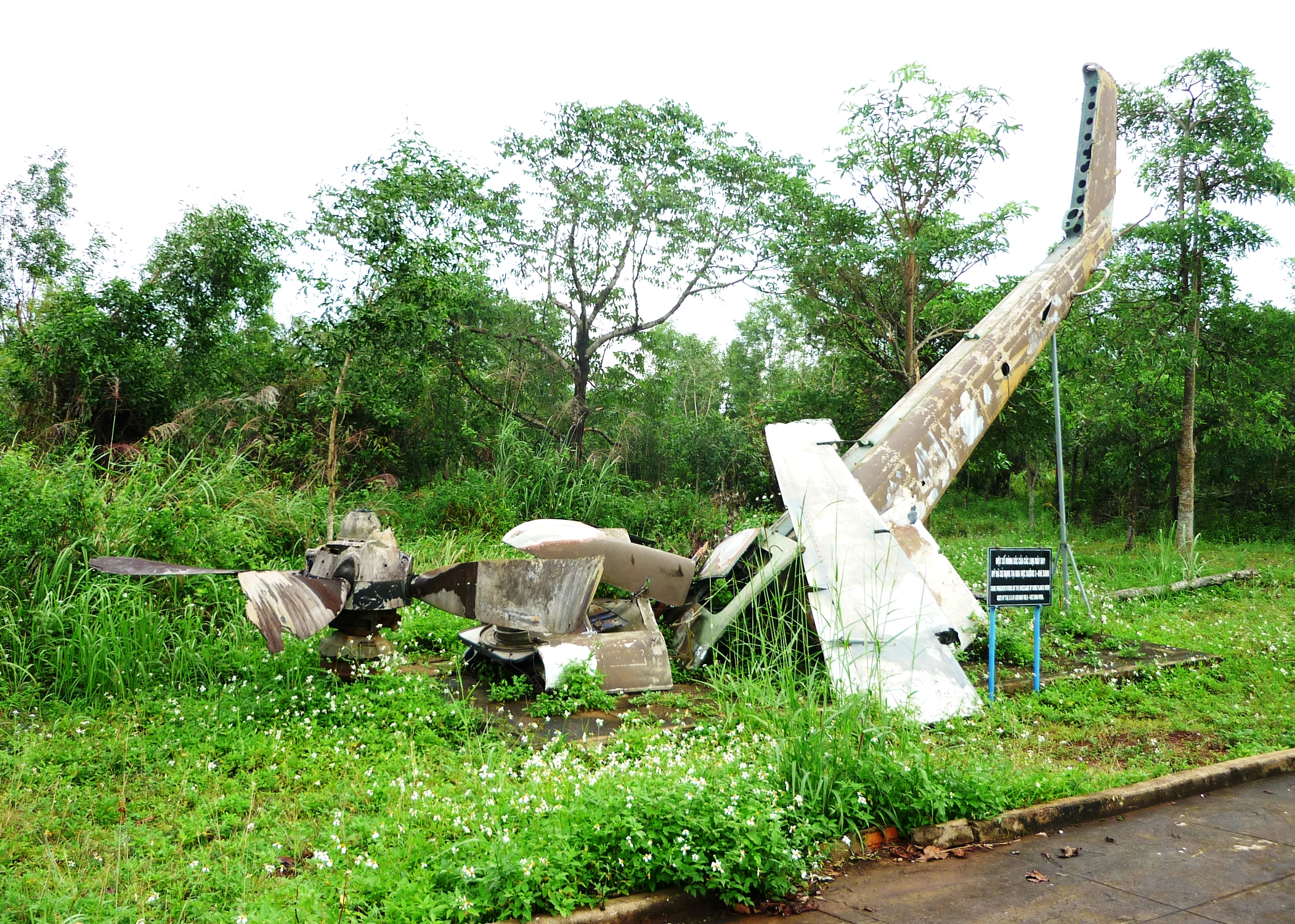
Wreckage of downed UH-1 Iroquois

- AH-1 Cobra—7 lost
- HUS-1—75 lost
- UH-1E Huey—69 lost
- CH-37 Mojave—1 lost
- CH-46D Sea Knight—109 lost
- CH-53 Sea Stallion—9 lost

=== United States Army ===
==== USA fixed-wing ====
- OV-1A/B/C/D Mohawk—65 lost
- O-1 Bird Dog—297 lost

==== USA rotary-wing ====
5,195+

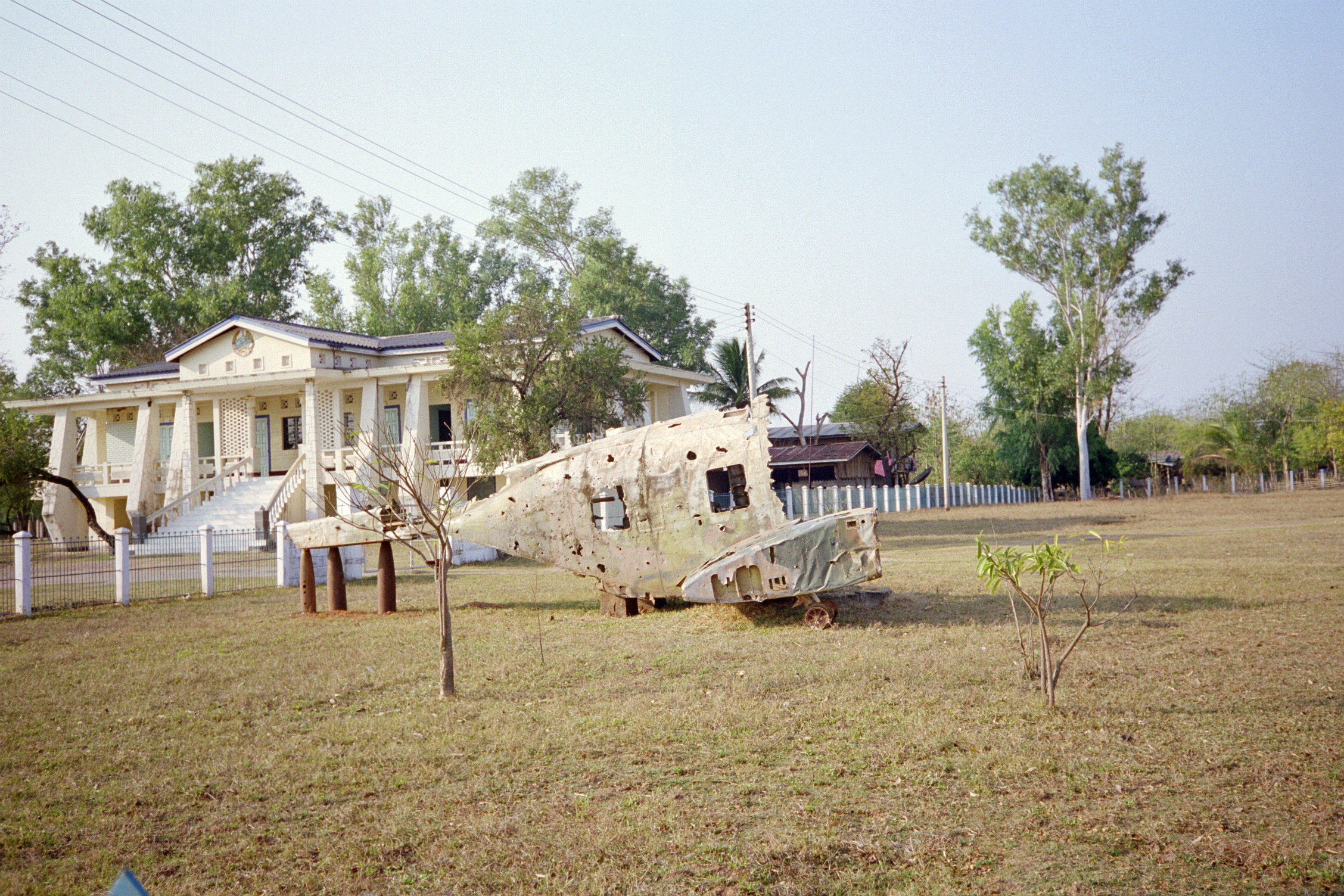
Wreckage of downed USAF HH-3 Jolly Green Giant helicopter

- Bell 205—1 lost (Air America)
- AH-1G—303 lost+

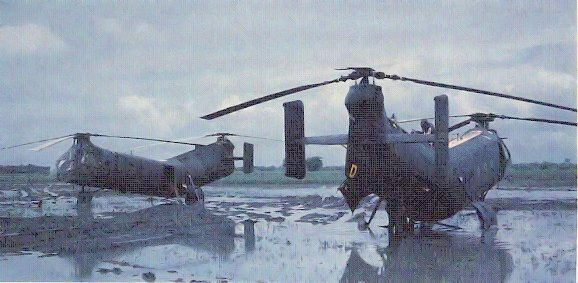
Two downed CH-21s

- CH-21C—14 lost
- CH-34—2 lost
- CH-37B—1 lost
- CH-37C—1 lost

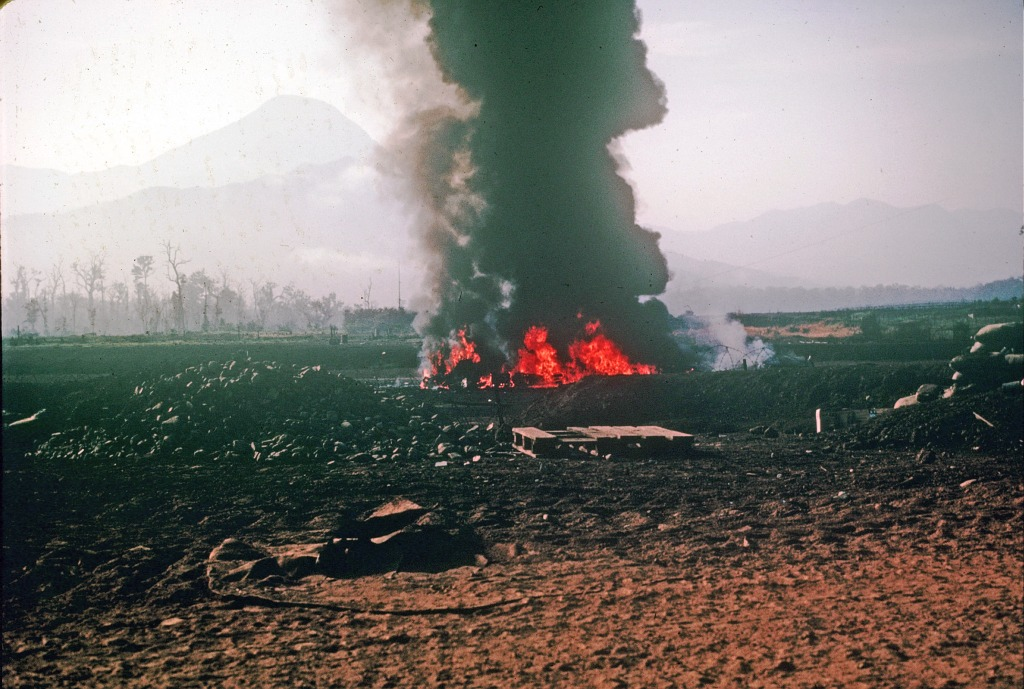
Downed CH-47 Chinook

- CH-47A—83 lost
- CH-47B—20 lost
- CH-47C—29 lost
- CH-54A—9 lost
- H-13D—3 lost
- H-37A—2 lost
- OH-13S—147 lost
- OH-23G—93 lost
- OH-58A—45 lost
- OH-6A—842 lost
- UH-1—60 lost
- UH-1A—1 lost
- UH-1C—365 lost
- UH-1D—886 lost
- UH-1E—90 lost
- UH-1F—18 lost
- UH-1H—1,313 lost
- UH-34D—176 lost

== Republic of Vietnam aircraft ==
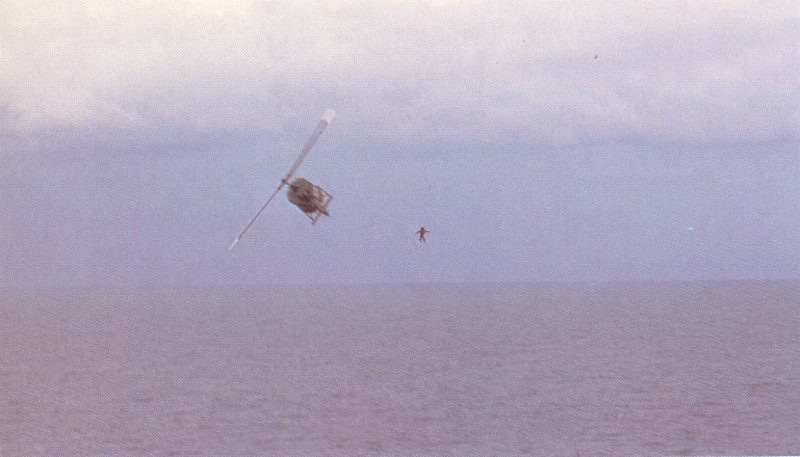
RVNAF pilot jumps into the sea from his UH-1 during Operation Frequent Wind

- A-1 Skyraider – 225 lost
- A-37A/B Dragonfly – 38 lost
- AC-47 – 9 lost
- C/AC-119G/K Stinger – 8 lost
- C-7A Caribou – 6 lost
- C/EC-47 Skytrain – 17 lost
- C-123K Provider – 11 lost
- C-130A Hercules – 2 lost
- F-5A/B/C/E Freedom Fighter/Tiger II – ~250 lost (including 114 captured)
- U/H-1D/H Iroquois (helicopter) – 332 lost
- C/UH-34C/D/G Choctaw (helicopter) – 140 lost
- CH-47A Chinook (helicopter) – 10 lost
- O-1 Bird Dog – 152 lost
- O-2A Skymaster – 2 lost
- T-41D Mescalero – 1 lost
- U-6A Beaver – 10 lost
- U-17A/B Skywagon – 39 lost

North Vietnam captured 877 South Vietnamese aircraft at war's end.

== Royal Australian Air Force ==
=== Fixed wing ===
5 total

- C-7 Caribou—3 total, 1 in combat; all from No. 35 Squadron RAAF
  - Caribou A4-193 was destroyed by mortar fire while taxiing at That Son (near the Cambodian border) on 29 March 1970.
- English Electric Canberra—2 total, 2 in combat; both from No. 2 Squadron RAAF
  - First loss: Canberra A84-231 disappeared on 3 November 1970 on a night bombing mission in the northern 1st Corps Tactical Zone region of South Vietnam after dropping its bombs near Da Nang. Pilot Officer Robert Charles Carver (24) and Flying Officer Michael Patrick John Herbert (24), were both MIA until 30 July 2009 when their remains were positively identified.
  - Final loss: A84-228 shot down by two SA-2 SAM missiles on 14 March 1971; Wing Commander F. J. L. Downing and Flight Lieutenant A.J. Pinches were both rescued.

=== Rotary-wing ===
- UH-1—6 total, all from No. 9 Squadron RAAF

== Democratic Republic of Vietnam Aircraft ==
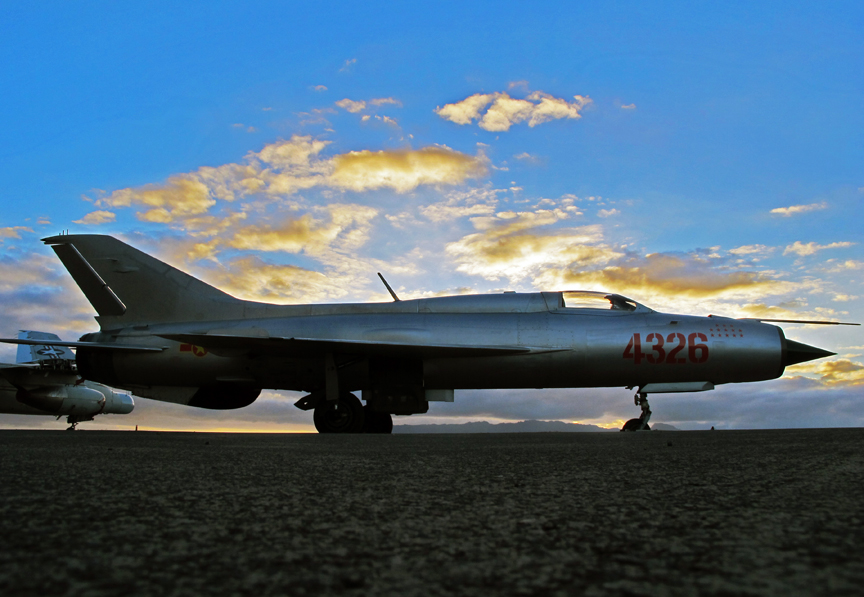
MiG-21 No.4326, which shot down 13 aircraft during the war

Claimed by VPAF: 154 MiG aircraft lost through all causes, including 131 in air combat (includes 63 MiG-17s, 8 MiG-19s and 60 MiG-21s)

Russian source: 65 MiG-21s, 5 MiG-19s, 75 MiG-17s lost through all causes. 2 Mi-4, 5 An-2, 5 Il-14, 1 MiG-15UTI, 1 Il-28, 1 L-29, 1 Lisunov Li-2 lost through all causes Total: 159 aircraft and 2 helicopter lost.

== People's Republic of China aircraft ==
- MiG-17 Fresco—1 thought to be shot down

== Total losses ==
Aircraft losses
Airframe	Type	United States of America	Australia	South Vietnam	North Vietnam
A-1 Skyraider		256		225	
A-3 Skywarrior		7			
Douglas A-4 Skyhawk		363			
A-6 Intruder		87			
A-7 Corsair II		106			
A-26 Invader		22			
A-37 Dragonfly	light attack	22		38	
AC-47 Spooky	gunship	19		9	
Fairchild AC-119 Shadow/Stinger	gunship	6		8	
Lockheed AC-130 Spectre	gunship	6			
ACH-47 Chinook	helicopter	3 (Note: Of four constructed two were lost to accidents, one to enemy action)			
AH-1 Cobra	attack helicopter	277			
An-2 Kukuruznik					5
B-52 Stratofortress	bomber	31			
Martin B-57 Canberra / English Electric Canberra	bomber	56	2		
Bell 204/ Bell 205	helicopter	2			
C-1 Trader		4			
C-2 Greyhound		2			
C-5 Galaxy	strategic transport	1			
C-7 Caribou	transport	19	3	6	
C-47 Skytrain	transport	21		17	
C-117 Skytrain		2			
C-123 Provider	transport	53		11	
C-130 Hercules	transport	55		2	
C-141 Starlifter	strategic transport	2			
CH-37 Mojave	helicopter	5			
CH-46 Sea Knight	helicopter	109			
CH-47 Chinook	helicopter	132		10	
CH-53 Sea Stallion	helicopter	9			-
CH-54 Tarhe	helicopter	9			
Grumman E-1 Tracer	airborne early warning	3			
Grumman E-2 Hawkeye	airborne early warning	2			
Douglas EA-1 Skyraider		4			
Grumman EA-6 Intruder		2			
Douglas EF-10 Skynight		5			
Douglas E/RB-66 Destroyer		14			
EC-121 BatCat		2			
EKA-3 Skywarrior		2			
F-4 Phantom II		678			
F-5 Freedom Fighter/Tiger II		9		250	
F-8 Crusader		139			
F-100 Super Sabre		243			
F-102 Delta Dagger		14			
F-104 Starfighter		14			
F-105 Thunderchief		382			
F-111 Aardvark	strike aircraft	11			
H-13 Sioux	helicopter	3			
H-21 Shawnee	helicopter	14			
H-34 Choctaw	helicopter	253		140	
HH-3 Jolly Green Giant	helicopter	34			
HH-43 Pedro	helicopter	13			
HH-53 Super Jolly Green Giant	helicopter	27			
HU-16 Albatross	helicopter	4			
Il-14					5
Il-28					1
KA-3 Skywarrior		2			
KB-50 Superfortress	tanker	1			
KC-130 Hercules	tanker	4			
KC-135 Stratotanker	tanker	3			
Aero L-29 Delfin					1
Lisunov Li-2	transport				1
Mi-4	helicopter				2
MiG-15					1
MiG-17					63 - 75
MiG-19					5 - 8
MiG-21					60 - 65
O-1 Bird Dog	observation aircraft	476		152	
O-2 Skymaster	observation aircraft	104		2	
OH-6 Cayuse	helicopter	842			
OH-13 Sioux	helicopter	147			
OH-23 Raven	helicopter	93			
OH-58 Kiowa	helicopter	58			
OV-1 Mohawk		65			
OV-10 Bronco		80			
P-3 Orion	maritime patrol	2			
QU-22 Pave Eagle		8			
RA-5 Vigilante		27			
RF-4 Phantom II		87			
RF-8 Crusader		30			
RF-101 Voodoo		39			
S-2 Tracker		5			
SH-2 Sea Sprite	helicopter	12			
SH-3 Sea King	helicopter	20			
SR-71 Blackbird	reconnaissance	2			
T-28 Trojan	trainer	23			
T-41 Mescalero				1	
TA-4 Skyhawk		10			
TF-9 Cougar		1			
U-2 Dragon Lady	reconnaissance	1			
U-3 Blue Canoe		1			
U-6 Beaver		1		10	
U-10 Courier		1			
U-17 Skywagon				39	
UH-1 Iroquois	helicopter	2,838	6	332	
Total:		8,540	11	1,351	144 - 164

== See also ==
- List of United States aerial victories of the Vietnam War

== Sources ==
- Correll, John T. (September 2004). "The Vietnam War Almanac" (PDF). Air & Space Forces Magazine. Vol. 87, no. 9. Archived (PDF) from the original on 28 April 2025.
- Campbell, John M. and Hill, Michael. Roll Call: Thud. Atglen, PA: Schiffer Publishing Ltd., 1996. ISBN 0-7643-0062-8.
- Hobson, Chris. Vietnam Air Losses, USAF, USN, USMC, Fixed-Wing Aircraft Losses in Southeast Asia 1961–1973. North Branch, Minnesota: Specialty Press, 2001. ISBN 1-85780-115-6.
- Francillon, René. Tonkin Gulf Yacht Club: US Carrier Operations off Vietnam, Naval Institute Press (1988) ISBN 0-87021-696-1
- US Air-to-Air Losses in the Vietnam War, 2002, archived from the original on 31 March 2012
- US Air-to-Air Victories in the Vietnam War
