= List of United States aerial victories of the Vietnam War =

The following is a list of United States aerial victories of the Vietnam War. While U.S. sources claimed 195 North Vietnamese Vietnam People's Air Force aircraft were shot down in air to air combat, the North Vietnamese claim that only 134 aircraft were lost.

| Date | Squadron | Aircraft | Weapon | Pilot | Radar Intercept Officer/Weapons System Officer | Aircraft destroyed | Notes |
|---|---|---|---|---|---|---|---|
| 1965 April 4 | 416th TFS | F-100D | 20mm | Kilgus D. Capt | N/A | MiG-17 | listed as probable kill |
| 1965 April 9 | VF-96 | F-4B | | Murphy T. LTJG | Fegan R. ENS | MiG-17 (PLAAF) | LTJG Murphy and ENS Fegan shot down and KIA either by another MiG or by friendly fire |
| 1965 June 17 | VF-21 | F-4B | AIM-7 | Page L. CDR | Smith J. LCDR | MiG-17 | |
| 1965 June 17 | VF-21 | F-4B | AIM-7 | Batson J. LT | Doremus R. LCDR | MiG-17 | |
| 1965 June 20 | VA-25 | A-1H | 20mm | Johnson C. LT | N/A | MiG-17 | shared kill with other VA-25 aircraft |
| 1965 June 20 | VA-25 | A-1H | 20mm | Hartman C. LTJG | N/A | MiG-17 | shared kill with other VA-25 aircraft |
| 1965 July 10 | 45th TFS | F-4C | AIM-9 | Roberts T. Capt | Anderson R. Capt | MiG-17 | |
| 1965 July 10 | 45th TFS | F-4C | AIM-9 | Holcombe K. Capt | Clark A. Capt | MiG-17 | |
| 1966 April 23 | 555th TFS | F-4C | AIM-9 | Cameron M. Capt | Evans R. 1st Lt | MiG-17 | |
| 1966 April 23 | 555th TFS | F-4C | AIM-7 | Blake R. Capt | George S. 1st Lt | MiG-17 | |
| 1966 April 26 | 480th TFS | F-4C | AIM-9 | Gilmore P. Maj | Smith W. 1st Lt | MiG-21 | |
| 1966 April 29 | 555th TFS | F-4C | Maneuvering | Keith L. Capt | Bleakley R. 1st Lt | MiG-17 | |
| 1966 April 30 | 555th TFS | F-4C | AIM-9 | Golberg L. Capt | Hardgrave G. 1st Lt | MiG-17 | |
| 1966 May 12 | 390th TFS | F-4C | AIM-9 | Dudley W. Maj | Kringelis I. 1st Lt | MiG-17 | |
| 1966 June 12 | VF-211 | F-8E | AIM-9D | Marr H. CDR | N/A | MiG-17 | |
| 1966 June 21 | VF-211 | F-8E | AIM-9D | Vampatella P. LTJG | N/A | MiG-17 | |
| 1966 June 21 | VF-211 | F-8E | 20 mm | Chancy E. LT | N/A | MiG-17 | |
| 1966 June 29 | 421st TFS | F-105D | 20mm | Tracy F. Maj | N/A | MiG-17 | |
| 1966 July 13 | VF-161 | F-4B | AIM-7 | McGuigan W. LT | Fowler R. LTJG | MiG-17 | |
| 1966 July 14 | 480th TFS | F-4C | AIM-9 | Swendner W. Capt | Buttell D. 1st Lt | MiG-21 | |
| 1966 July 14 | 480th TFS | F-4C | AIM-9 | Martin R. 1st Lt | Krieps R. 1st Lt | MiG-21 | |
| 1966 August 18 | 34th TFS | F-105D | 20mm | Blank K. Maj | N/A | MiG-17 | |
| 1966 September 16 | 555th TFS | F-4C | AIM-9 | Jameson J. 1st Lt | Rose D. 1st Lt | MiG-17 | |
| 1966 September 21 | 421st TFS | F-105D | 20mm | Richter K. 1st Lt | N/A | MiG-17 | |
| 1966 September 21 | 333rd TFS | F-105D | 20mm | Wilson F. 1st Lt | N/A | MiG-17 | |
| 1966 October 9 | VA-176 | A-1H | 20mm | Patton W. LTJG | N/A | MiG-17 | |
| 1966 October 9 | VF-162 | F-8E | AIM-9 | Bellinger D. CDR | N/A | MiG-21 | |
| 1966 November 5 | 480th TFS | F-4C | AIM-7 | Tuck J. MAaj | Rabeni J. 1st Lt | MiG-21 | |
| 1966 November 5 | 480th TFS | F-4C | AIM-9 | Latham W. 1st Lt | Klause K. 1st Lt | MiG-21 | |
| 1966 December 4 | 469th TFS | F-105D | 20mm | Dickey R. Maj | N/A | MiG-17 | |
| 1966 December 20 | VF-114 | F-4B | AIM-7 | Wisely H. LT | Jordan D. LTJG | An-2 | |
| 1966 December 20 | VF-213 | F-4B | AIM-7 | McRae D. LT | Nichols D. ENS | An-2 | |
| 1967 January 2 | 555th TFS | F-4C | AIM-7 | Wetterhahn R. 1st Lt | Sharp J. 1st Lt | MiG-21 | Operation Bolo |
| 1967 January 2 | 555th TFS | F-4C | AIM-9 | Radeker W. Capt | Murray J. 1st Lt | MiG-21 | Operation Bolo |
| 1967 January 2 | 555th TFS | F-4C | AIM-9 | Olds R. Col | Clifton C. 1st Lt | MiG-21 | Operation Bolo |
| 1967 January 2 | 555th TFS | F-4C | AIM-9 | Raspberry E. Capt | Western R. 1st Lt | MiG-21 | Operation Bolo |
| 1967 January 2 | 433rd TFS | F-4C | AIM-7 | Combies P. Maj | Dutton L. 1st Lt | MiG-21 | Operation Bolo |
| 1967 January 2 | 433rd TFS | F-4C | AIM-7 | Stone J. Capt | Dunnegan C. 1st Lt | MiG-21 | Operation Bolo |
| 1967 January 2 | 433rd TFS | F-4C | AIM-7 | Glynn L. 1st Lt | Cary L. 1st Lt | MiG-21 | Operation Bolo |
| 1967 January 6 | 555th TFS | F-4C | AIM-7 | Pascoe R. Capt | Wells N. 1st Lt | MiG-21 | |
| 1967 January 6 | 555th TFS | F-4C | AIM-7 | Hirsch T. Maj | Strasswimmer R. 1st Lt | MiG-21 | |
| 1967 March 10 | 354th TFS | F-105D | 20mm | Brestel M. Capt | N/A | MiG-17 | |
| 1967 March 10 | 354th TFS | F-105D | 20mm | Brestel M. Capt | N/A | MiG-17 | |
| 1967 March 26 | 333rd TFS | F-105D | 20mm | Scott R. Col | N/A | MiG-17 | |
| 1967 April 19 | 357th TFS | F-105F | 20mm | Thorsness L. Maj | Johnson H. Capt | MiG-17 | |
| 1967 April 19 | 354th TFS | F-105D | 20mm | Tolman F. Maj | N/A | MiG-17 | |
| 1967 April 19 | 354th TFS | F-105D | 20mm | Hunt J. Maj | N/A | MiG-17 | |
| 1967 April 19 | 354th TFS | F-105D | 20mm | Eskew W. Capt | N/A | MiG-17 | |
| 1967 April 23 | 389th TFS | F-4C | AIM-7 | Anderson R. Maj | Kjer F. Capt | MiG-21 | |
| 1967 April 24 | VF-114 | F-4B | AIM-9 | Wisely H. LT | Anderson G. LTJG | MiG-17 | |
| 1967 April 24 | VF-114 | F-4B | AIM-9 | Southwick C. LCDR | Laing J. ENS | MiG-17 | |
| 1967 April 26 | 389th TFS | F-4C | AIM-7 | Moore R. Maj | Sears J. 1st Lt | MiG-21 | |
| 1967 April 28 | 357th TFS | F-105D | 20mm | Higgins H. Maj | N/A | MiG-17 | |
| 1967 April 28 | 354th TFS | F-105D | 20mm | Dennis A. Lt Col | N/A | MiG-17 | |
| 1967 April 30 | 333rd TFS | F-105D | 20mm | Lesan T. Capt | N/A | MiG-17 | |
| 1967 May 1 | VF-211 | F-8E | AIM-9 | Wright M. LCDR | N/A | MiG-17 | |
| 1967 May 1 | VA-76 | A-4C | Zuni | Swartz T. LCDR | N/A | MiG-17 | |
| 1967 May 1 | 390th TFS | F-4C | Maneuvering | Dilger R. Maj | Thies M. 1st | MiG-17 | |
| 1967 May 4 | 390th TFS | F-4C | AIM-9 | Olds R. Col | LaFever W. 1st Lt | MiG-21 | |
| 1967 May 12 | 333rd TFS | F-105D | 20mm | Suzanne J. Capt | N/A | MiG-17 | |
| 1967 May 13 | 354th TFS | F-105D | 20mm | Gast P. Lt Col | N/A | MiG-17 | |
| 1967 May 13 | 354th TFS | F-105D | 20mm | Couch C. Capt | N/A | MiG-17 | |
| 1967 May 13 | 333rd TFS | F-105D | AIM-9 | Rilling R. Maj | N/A | MiG-17 | |
| 1967 May 13 | 333rd TFS | F-105D | AIM-9 | Osborne C. Maj | N/A | MiG-17 | |
| 1967 May 13 | 433rd TFS | F-4C | AIM-9 | Kirk W. Maj | Wayne S. 1st Lt | MiG-17 | |
| 1967 May 13 | 433rd TFS | F-4C | AIM-7 | Haeffner F. Lt Col | Bever M. 1st Lt | MiG-17 | |
| 1967 May 13 | 44th TFS | F-105D | 20mm | Seaver M. Maj | N/A | MiG-17 | |
| 1967 May 14 | 480th TFS | F-4C | 20mm | Hargrove J. MAaj | DeMuth S. 1st Lt | MiG-17 | |
| 1967 May 14 | 480th TFS | F-4C | 20mm | Craig J. Capt | Talley J. 1st Lt | MiG-17 | |
| 1967 May 14 | 480th TFS | F-4C | AIM-7 | Bakke S. Maj | Lambert R. Capt | MiG-17 | |
| 1967 May 19 | VF-211 | F-8E | AIM-9D | Speer P. CDR | N/A | MiG-17 | |
| 1967 May 19 | VF-211 | F-8E | AIM-9D | Shea J. LTJG | N/A | MiG-17 | |
| 1967 May 19 | VF-24 | F-8C | AIM-9D | Lee B. LCDR | N/A | MiG-17 | |
| 1967 May 19 | VF-24 | F-8C | AIM-9D | Wood P. LT | N/A | MiG-17 | |
| 1967 May 20 | 389th TFS | F-4C | AIM-7 | Titus R. Lt Col | Zimer M. 1st Lt | MiG-21 | |
| 1967 May 20 | 389th TFS | F-4C | AIM-9 | Janca R. Maj | Roberts W. 1st Lt | MiG-21 | |
| 1967 May 20 | 433rd TFS | F-4C | AIM-9 | Pardo J. Maj | Wayne S. 1st Lt | MiG-17 | |
| 1967 May 20 | 433rd TFS | F-4C | AIM-7 | Olds R. Col | Croker S. 1st Lt | MiG-17 | |
| 1967 May 20 | 433rd TFS | F-4C | AIM-9 | Combies P. Maj | Lafferty D. 1st Lt | MiG-17 | |
| 1967 May 20 | 433rd TFS | F-4C | AIM-9 | Olds R. Col | Croker S. 1st Lt | MiG-17 | |
| 1967 May 22 | 389th TFS | F-4C | AIM-9 | Titus R. Lt Col | Zimer M. 1s Lt | MiG-21 | |
| 1967 May 22 | 389th TFS | F-4C | 20mm | Titus R. Lt Col | Zimer M. 1st Lt | MiG-21 | |
| 1967 June 3 | 469th TFS | F-105D | AIM-9/20mm | Wiggins L. Capt | N/A | MiG-17 | |
| 1967 June 3 | 13th TFS | F-105D | 20mm | Kuster R. Maj | N/A | MiG-17 | |
| 1967 June 5 | 555th TFS | F-4D | AIM-7 | Raspberry E. Maj | Gullick F. Capt | MiG-17 | |
| 1967 June 5 | 480th TFS | F-4C | 20mm | Priester D. Maj | Pankhurst J. Capt | MiG-17 | |
| 1967 June 5 | 480th TFS | F-4C | AIM-9 | Pascoe R. Capt | Wells N. Capt | MiG-17 | |
| 1967 July 21 | VF-24 | F-8C | AIM-9 | Isaacks M. CDR | N/A | MiG-17 | |
| 1967 July 21 | VF-24 | F-8C | AIM-9/20mm | Kirkwood R. LCDR | N/A | MiG-17 | |
| 1967 July 21 | VF-211 | F-8E | 20mm/Zuni | Hubbard T. LCDR | N/A | MiG-17 | |
| 1967 August 10 | VF-142 | F-4B | AIM-9 | Freeborn G. LTJG | Elliott R. ENS | MiG-21 | |
| 1967 August 10 | VF-142 | F-4B | AIM-9 | Davis R. LCDR | Elie G. LCDR | MiG-21 | |
| 1967 August 23 | 34th TFS | F-105D | 20mm | Waldrop D. 1st Lt | N/A | MiG-17 | |
| 1967 October 18 | 333rd TFS | F-105D | 20mm | Russell D. Maj | N/A | MiG-17 | |
| 1967 October 24 | 433rd TFS | F-4D | 20mm | Kirk W. Maj | Bongartz T. 1st Lt | MiG-21 | |
| 1967 October 26 | 555th TFS | F-4D | AIM-7 | Logeman J. Capt | McCoy F. 1at Lt | MiG-17 | |
| 1967 October 26 | 555th TFS | F-4D | AIM-7 | Gordon W. Capt | Monsees J. 1st Lt | MiG-17 | |
| 1967 October 26 | 555th TFS | F-4D | AIM-4 | Cobb L. Capt | Lavoy A. Capt | MiG-17 | |
| 1967 October 26 | VF-143 | F-4B | AIM-7 | Hickey R. LTJG | Morris J. LTJG | MiG-21 | |
| 1967 October 27 | 354th TFS | F-105D | 20mm | Basel G. Capt | N/A | MiG-17 | |
| 1967 October 30 | VF-142 | F-4B | AIM-7E | Lund E. LCDR | Borst J. LTJG | MiG-17 | |
| 1967 November 6 | 435th TFS | F-4D | 20mm | Simmonds D. Capt | McKinney G. 1st Lt | MiG-17 | |
| 1967 November 6 | 435th TFS | F-4D | 20mm | Simmonds D. Capt | McKinney G. 1st Lt | MiG-17 | |
| 1967 December 14 | VF-162 | F-8E | AIM-9D | Wyman R. LT | N/A | MiG-17 | |
| 1967 December 17 | 13th TFS | F-4D | AIM-4 | Ryan J. 1st Lt | Baker D. Capt USMC | MiG-17 | |
| 1967 December 19 | 435th TFS | F-4D | 20mm | Moore J. Maj | McKinney G. 1st Lt | MiG-17 | half-credit shared with 333rd TFS |
| 1967 December 19 | 333rd TFS | F-105F | 20mm | Dalton W. Maj | Graham J. Maj | MiG-17 | half-credit shared with 435th TFS |
| 1967 December 19 | 333rd TFS | F-105F | 20mm | Drew P. Capt | Wheeler W. Maj | MiG-17 | |
| 1968 January 3 | 435th TFS | F-4D | AIM-4 | Squier C. Lt Col | Muldoon M. 1st Lt | MiG-17 | |
| 1968 January 3 | 433rd TFS | F-4D | 20mm | Bogoslofski B. Maj | Huskey R. Capt | MiG-17 | |
| 1968 January 12 | Air America | Bell 205 | AK-47 | Mechanic G. Woods | N/A | An-2 | Battle of Lima Site 85 |
| 1968 January 18 | 435th TFS | F-4D | AIM-4 | Simonet K. Maj | Smith W. 1st Lt | MiG-17 | |
| 1968 February 5 | 13th TFS | F-4D | AIM-4 | Hill R. Capt | Huneke B. 1st Lt | MiG-21 | |
| 1968 February 6 | 433rd TFS | F-4D | AIM-7 | Boles R. Capt | Battista R. 1st Lt | MiG-21 | |
| 1968 February 12 | 435th TFS | F-4D | AIM-7 | Lang A. Lt Col | Moss R. 1st Lt | MiG-21 | |
| 1968 February 14 | 555th TFS | F-4D | 20mm | Howerton R. Maj | Voigt T. 1st Lt | MiG-17 | |
| 1968 February 14 | 435th TFS | F-4D | AIM-7 | Williams D. Col | Feighny J. 1st Lt | MiG-17 | |
| 1968 May 9 | VF-96 | F-4B | AIM-7 | Heffernan F. Capt USAF | Schumacher F. LTJG | MiG-21 | Officially listed as probable kill |
| 1968 June 26 | VF-51 | F-8H | AIM-9 | Myers R. LCDR | N/A | MiG-17 | |
| 1968 July 9 | VF-191 | F-8E | AIM-9/20mm | Nichols J. LCDR | N/A | MiG-17 | |
| 1968 July 10 | VF-33 | F-4J | AIM-9 | Cash R. LT | Kain J. LT | MiG-21 | |
| 1968 July 29 | VF-53 | F-8E | AIM-9 | Cane G. LCDR | N/A | MiG-17 | |
| 1968 August 1 | VF-51 | F-8H | AIM-9 | McCoy N. LT | N/A | MiG-21 | |
| 1968 September 9 | VF-111 | F-8C | AIM-9 | Nargi T. LT | N/A | MiG-21 | |
| 1970 March 28 | VF-142 | F-4J | AIM-9 | Beaulier J. LT | Barkley S. LTJG | MiG-21 | |
| 1972 January 19 | VF-96 | F-4J | AIM-9 | Cunningham R. LT | Driscoll W. LTJG | MiG-21 | |
| 1972 February 21 | 555th TFS | F-4D | AIM-7 | Lodge R. Maj | Locher R. 1st Lt | MiG-21 | |
| 1972 March 1 | 555th TFS | F-4D | AIM-7 | Kittinger J. Lt Col | Hodgdon L. 1st Lt | MiG-21 | |
| 1972 March 6 | VF-111 | F-4B | AIM-9D | Weigand G. LT | Freckleton W. LTJG | MiG-17 | |
| 1972 March 30 | 13th TFS | F-4D | AIM-7 | Olmstead F. Capt | Volloy G. Capt | MiG-21 | |
| 1972 April 16 | 13th TFS | F-4D | AIM-7 | Olmstead F. Capt | Maas S. Capt | MiG-21 | |
| 1972 April 16 | 13th TFS | F-4D | AIM-7 | Cherry E. Maj | Feinstein J. Capt | MiG-21 | |
| 1972 April 16 | 523rd TFS | F-4D | AIM-7 | Null J. Capt | Vahue M. Capt | MiG-21 | |
| 1972 May 6 | VF-114 | F-4J | AIM-9 | Hughes R. LT | Cruz A. LTJG | MiG-21 | |
| 1972 May 6 | VF-114 | F-4J | AIM-9 | Pettigrew K. LCDR | McCabe M. LTJG | MiG-21 | |
| 1972 May 6 | VF-51 | F-4B | AIM-9 | Houston J. LCDR | Moore K. LT | MiG-17 | |
| 1972 May 8 | 13th TFS | F-4D | AIM-7 | Crews B. Maj | Jones K. Capt | MiG-19 | |
| 1972 May 8 | 555th TFS | F-4D | AIM-7 | Lodge R. Maj | Locher R. Capt | MiG-21 | |
| 1972 May 8 | VF-96 | F-4J | AIM-9 | Cunningham R. LT | Driscoll W. LTJG | MiG-17 | |
| 1972 May 10 | VF-96 | F-4J | AIM-9 | Cunningham R. LT | Driscoll W. LTJG | MiG-17 | |
| 1972 May 10 | VF-96 | F-4J | AIM-9 | Cunningham R. LT | Driscoll W. LTJG | MiG-17 | |
| 1972 May 10 | VF-96 | F-4J | AIM-9 | Cunningham R. LT | Driscoll W. LTJG | MiG-17 | |
| 1972 May 10 | VF-92 | F-4J | AIM-9 | Dose C. LT | McDevitt J. LCDR | MiG-21 | |
| 1972 May 10 | VF-96 | F-4J | AIM-9 | Connelly M. LT | Blonsky T. LT | MiG-17 | |
| 1972 May 10 | VF-96 | F-4J | AIM-9 | Connelly M. LT | Blonsky T. LT | MiG-17 | |
| 1972 May 10 | VF-51 | F-4B | AIM-9 | Morris R. LT | Cannon K. LT | MiG-17 | |
| 1972 May 10 | VF-96 | F-4J | AIM-9 | Shoemaker S. LT | Crenshaw J. LTJG | MiG-17 | |
| 1972 May 10 | 555th TFS | F-4D | AIM-7 | Lodge R. Maj | Locher R. Capt | MiG-21 | |
| 1972 May 10 | 555th TFS | F-4D | AIM-7 | Markle J. 1st Lt | Eaves S. Capt | MiG-21 | |
| 1972 May 10 | 555th TFS | F-4D | AIM-7 | Ritchie S. Capt | DeBellevue C. Capt | MiG-21 | |
| 1972 May 11 | 555th TFS | F-4D | AIM-7 | Nichols S. Capt | Bell J. 1st Lt | MiG-21 | |
| 1972 May 12 | 555th TFS | F-4D | AIM-7 | Frye W. Lt Col | Cooney J. Lt Col | MiG-19 | |
| 1972 May 18 | VF-161 | F-4B | AIM-9 | Bartholomay H. LT | Brown O. LT | MiG-19 | |
| 1972 May 18 | VF-161 | F-4B | AIM-9 | Arwood P. LT | Bell J. LT | MiG-19 | |
| 1972 May 23 | VF-161 | F-4B | AIM-9 | McKeown R. LCDR | Ensch J. LT | MiG-17 | |
| 1972 May 23 | VF-161 | F-4B | AIM-9 | McKeown R. LCDR | Ensch J. LT | MiG-17 | |
| 1972 May 23 | VF-211 | F-8J | MiG pilot bailed out with the F-8 not firing | Tucker J. LT | N/A | MiG-17 | Listed as probable kill |
| 1972 May 23 | 35th TFS | F-4E | AIM-7 | Beckers L. Lt Col | Huwe J. Capt | MiG-19 | |
| 1972 May 23 | 35th TFS | F-4E | 20mm | Beatty J. Capt | Sumner J. 1st Lt | MiG-21 | |
| 1972 May 31 | 13th TFS | F-4E | AIM-9 | Leonard B. Capt | Feinstein J. Capt | MiG-21 | |
| 1972 May 31 | 555th TFS | F-4D | AIM-7 | Ritchie S. Capt | Pettit L. Capt | MiG-21 | |
| 1972 June 2 | 58th TFS | F-4E | 20mm | Handley P. Maj | Smallwood J. 1st Lt | MiG-19 | Only confirmed supersonic gun kill in history |
| 1972 June 11 | VF-51 | F-4B | AIM-9 | Teague F. CDR | Howell R. LT | MiG-17 | |
| 1972 June 11 | VF-51 | F-4B | AIM-9 | Copeland W. LT | Bouchoux D. LT | MiG-17 | |
| 1972 June 21 | VF-31 | F-4J | AIM-9 | Flynn S. CDR | John W. LT | MiG-21 | |
| 1972 June 21 | 469th TFS | F-4E | AIM-9 | Christiansen V. Lt Col | Harden K. Maj | MiG-21 | |
| 1972 July 8 | 4th TFS | F-4E | AIM-7 | Hardy R. Capt | Lewinski P. Capt | MiG-21 | |
| 1972 July 8 | 555th TFS | F-4E | AIM-7 | Ritchie S. Capt | DeBellevue C. Capt | MiG-21 | |
| 1972 July 8 | 555th TFS | F-4E | AIM-7 | Ritchie S. Capt | DeBellevue C. Capt | MiG-21 | |
| 1972 July 18 | 13th TFS | F-4D | AIM-9 | Baily C. Lt Col | Feinstein J. Capt | MiG-21 | |
| 1972 July 29 | 13th TFS | F-4D | AIM-7 | Baily C. Lt Col | Feinstein J. Capt | MiG-21 | |
| 1972 July 29 | 4th TFS | F-4E | AIM-7 | Taft G. Lt Col | Imaye S. Capt | MiG-21 | |
| 1972 August 10 | VF-103 | F-4J | AIM-7E | Tucker R. LCDR | Edens S. LTJG | MiG-21 | Night kill. |
| 1972 August 12 | 58th TFS | F-4E | AIM-7 | Richard L. Capt USMC | Ettel M. LCDR USN | MiG-21 | |
| 1972 August 15 | 336th TFS | F-4E | AIM-7 | Sheffler F. Capt | Massen M. Capt | MiG-21 | |
| 1972 August 19 | 4th TFS | F-4E | AIM-7 | White S. Capt | Bettine F. 1st Lt | MiG-21 | |
| 1972 August 28 | 555th TFS | F-4D | AIM-7 | Ritchie S. Capt | DeBellevue C. Capt | MiG-21 | |
| 1972 September 2 | 34th TFS | F-4E | AIM-7 | Lucas J. Maj | Malloy D. 1st Lt | MiG-19 | |
| 1972 September 9 | 555th TFS | F-4D | 20mm | Tibbett C. Capt | Hargrove W. 1st Lt | MiG-21 | |
| 1972 September 9 | 555th TFS | F-4D | AIM-9 | Madden J. Capt | DeBellevue C. Capt | MiG-19 | |
| 1972 September 9 | 555th TFS | F-4D | AIM-9 | Madden J. Capt | DeBellevue C. Capt | MiG-19 | |
| 1972 September 11 | VMFA-333 | F-4J | AIM-9D | Lasseter L. Maj USMC | Cummings J. Capt USMC | MiG-21 | |
| 1972 September 12 | 35th TFS | F-4E | AIM-9 | Beckers L. Lt Col | Griffin T. 1st Lt | MiG-21 | |
| 1972 September 12 | 35th TFS | F-4E | 20mm | Retterbrush G. Maj | Autrey D. 1st Lt | MiG-21 | |
| 1972 September 12 | 469th TFS | F-4D | AIM-9 | Mahaffey M. Capt | Shields G. 1st Lt | MiG-21 | |
| 1972 September 16 | 555th TFS | F-4E | AIM-9 | Tibbett C. Capt | Hargrove W. 1st Lt | MiG-21 | |
| 1972 October 5 | 34th TFS | F-4E | AIM-7 | Coe R. Capt | Webb O. 1st Lt | MiG-21 | |
| 1972 October 6 | 34th TFS | F-4E | Maneuvering | Clouser G. Maj | Brunson C. 1st Lt | MiG-19 | shared kill with other 34th TFS aircraft |
| 1972 October 6 | 34th TFS | F-4E | Maneuvering | Barton C. Capt | Watson G. 1st Lt | MiG-19 | shared kill with other 34th TFS aircraft |
| 1972 October 8 | 35th TFS | F-4E | 20mm | Retterbrush G. Maj | Jasperson R. Capt | MiG-21 | |
| 1972 October 12 | 555th TFS | F-4D | Maneuvering | Madden J. Capt | Pettit L. Capt | MiG-21 | |
| 1972 October 13 | 13th TFS | F-4D | AIM-7 | Westphal C. Lt Col | Feinstein J. Capt | MiG-21 | |
| 1972 October 15 | 34th TFS | F-4E | AIM-9 | Holtz R. Maj | Diehl W. 1st Lt | MiG-21 | |
| 1972 October 15 | 307th TFS | F-4E | 20mm | Rubus G. Capt | Hendrickson J. Capt | MiG-21 | |
| 1972 October 15 | 307th TFS | F-4D | AIM-9 | McCoy I. Maj | Brown F. Maj | MiG-21 | |
| 1972 December 18 | 307th SW | B-52D | 0.50 Cal | | Turner O SSgt | MiG-21 | Operation Linebacker II |
| 1972 December 22 | 555th TFS | F-4D | AIM-7 | Brunson J. Lt Col | Pickett R. Maj | MiG-21 | |
| 1972 December 21 | 307th SW | B-52D | 0.50 Cal | | Moore A. A1C | MiG-21 | Operation Linebacker II |
| 1972 December 28 | VF-142 | F-4J | AIM-9 | Davis S. LTJG | Ulrich G. LTJG | MiG-21 | |
| 1972 December 28 | 555th TFS | F-4D | AIM-7 | McKee H. Maj | Dubler J. Capt | MiG-21 | |
| 1973 January 8 | 4th TFS | F-4D | AIM-7 | Howman P. Capt | Kullman L. 1st Lt | MiG-21 | |
| 1973 January 12 | VF-161 | F-4B | AIM-9 | Kovaleski V. LT | Wise J. LT | MiG-17 | |

== Key statistics extrapolated ==
The most successful:

- USAF squadron was the 555th TFS with 36 kills
- US Navy squadron was VF-96 with 10 kills
- Aircraft was the F-4 Phantom with 147 kills
- Weapons was the AIM-9 with 80 kills, although a few were AIM-9/20mm shared kills
- day was 10 May 1972 with 11 kills (7 MiG-17s and 4 MiG-21s)
- month was May 1972 with 28 kills

NOTE 1: For certain early USAF F-4 victories, WSO aft seat was occupied by a junior USAF Pilot in lieu of a USAF Navigator WSO
NOTE 2: For certain F-4 victories, one USN aircraft had a USAF exchange pilot, one USAF aircraft had a USMC exchange RIO as WSO, and another USAF aircraft had a USMC exchange pilot and a USN exchange RIO as WSO
NOTE 3: For USAF F-105F victories, the WSO was actually an Electronic Warfare Officer (EWO)
NOTE 4: For USAF B-52D victories, the aerial victory is attributed to the enlisted tail gunner

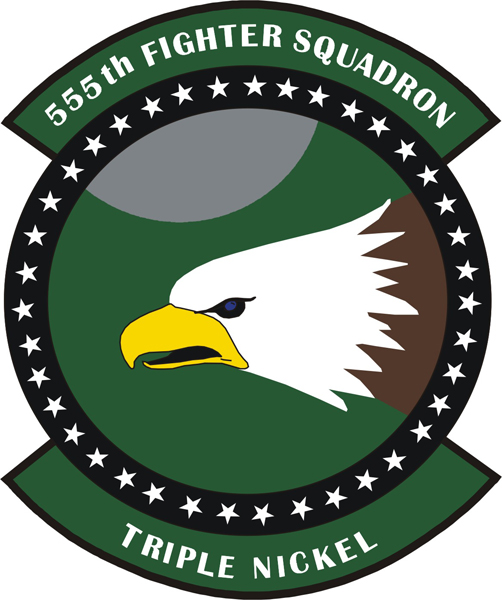
555th TFS Insignia

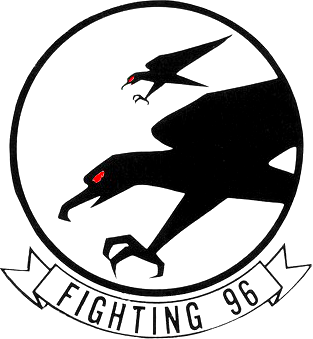
VF-96 insignia

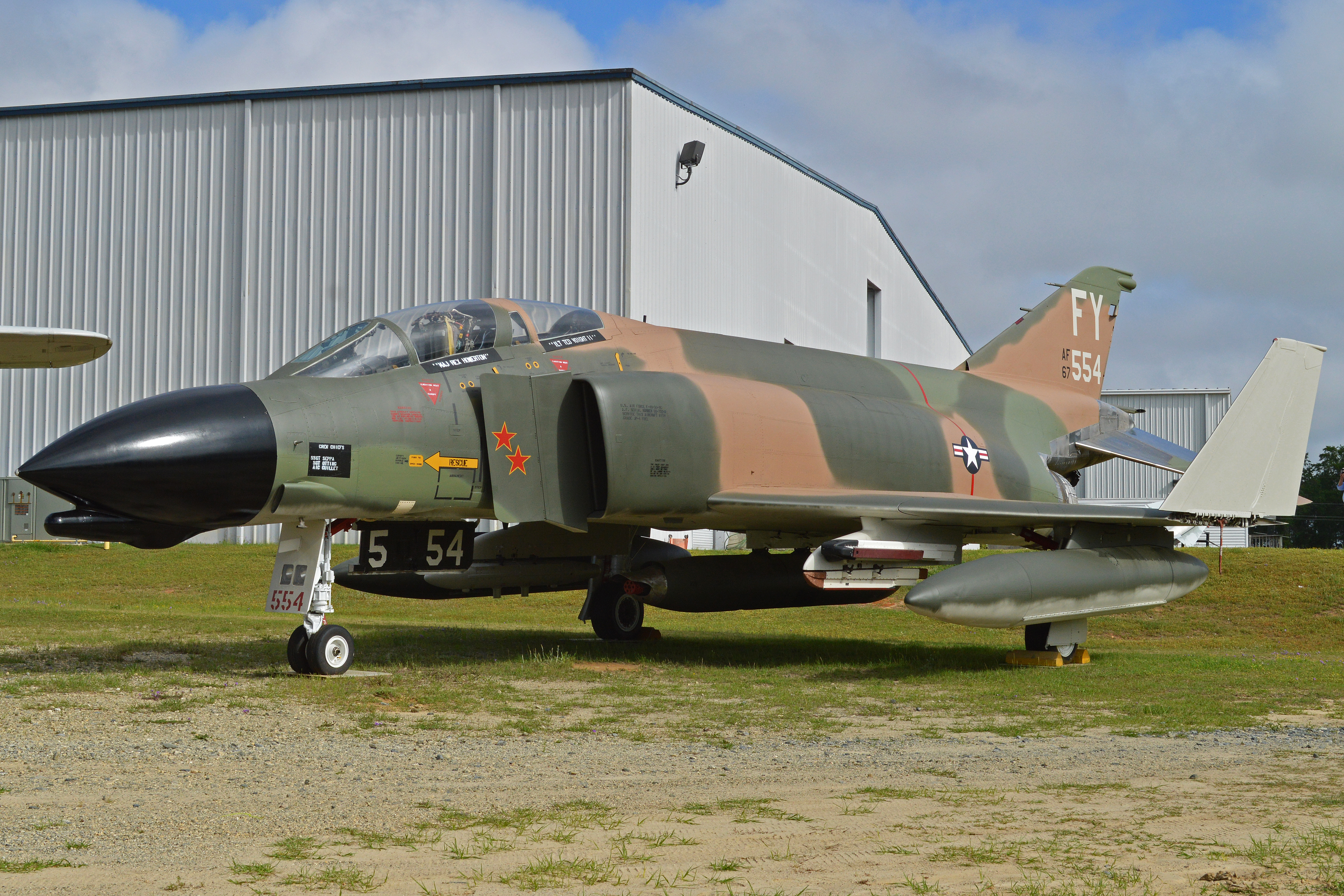
555th TFS F-4D

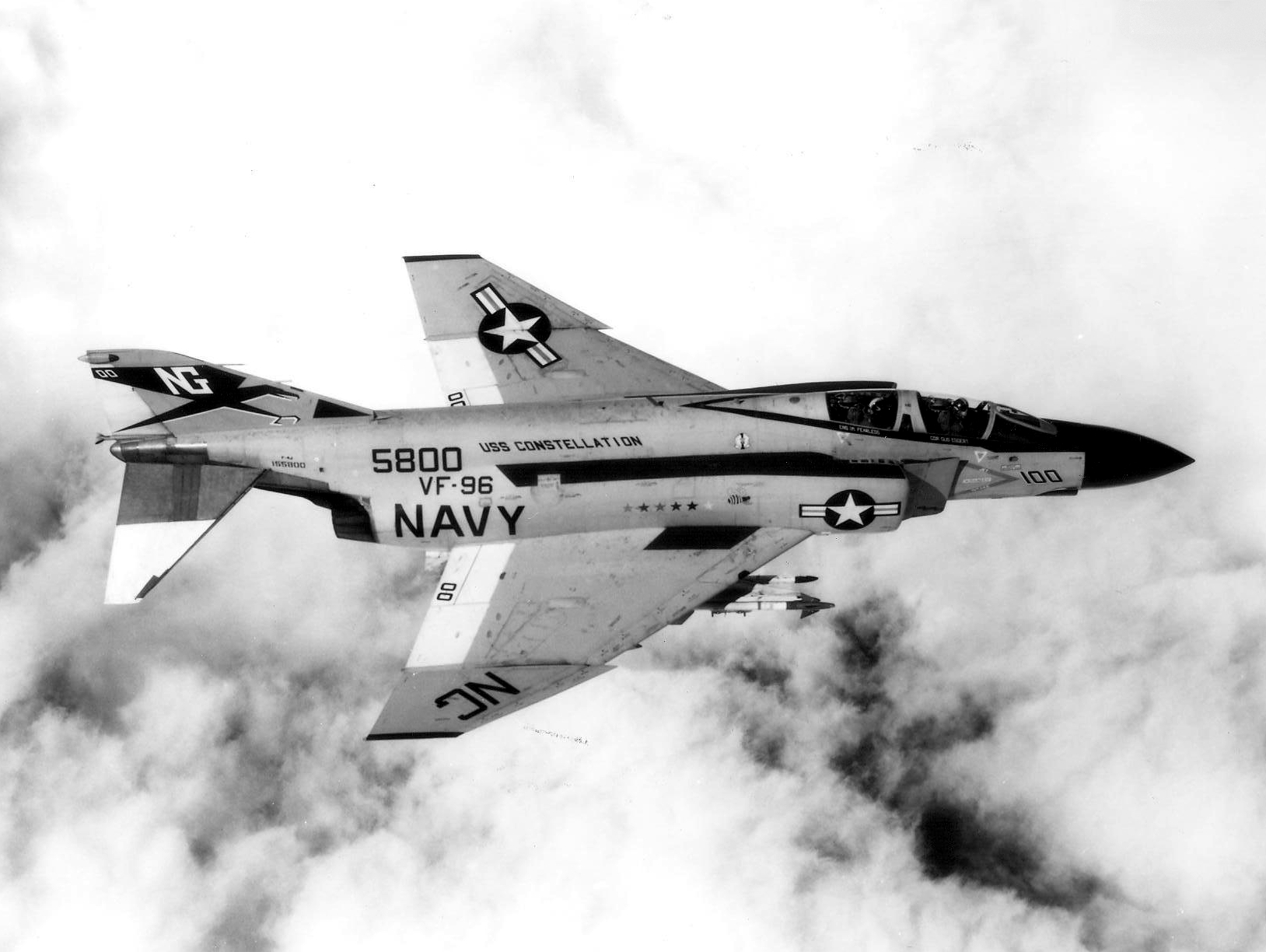
VF-96 F-4J

AIM-9s on an F-8

== See also ==
- Aircraft losses of the Vietnam War
- List of Vietnam War flying aces
