= List of ambassadors of Vietnam to the United States =

Coordinates: 38.906667°N 77.044444°W

Ambassador of Vietnam to the United States
- Emblem of Vietnam

- Flag of Vietnam

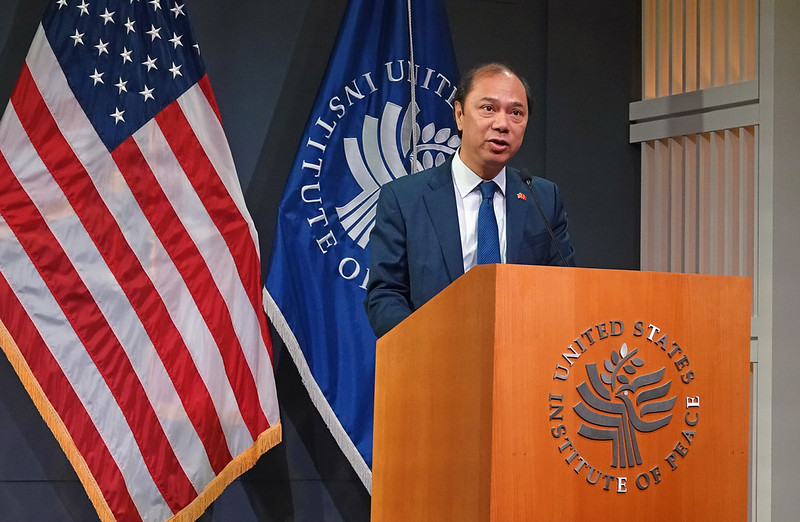
- Incumbent; Nguyễn Quốc Dũng since February 16, 2022
- Inaugural holder: Trần Văn Khá
- Formation: July 1, 1952

The Vietnamese Ambassador to the United States is the official representative of the Vietnamese government to the government of the United States. The embassy is located at the Lion Building and the ambassador resides in Washington, D.C. at 2251 R Street, Northwest.

From the 1950s to May 23, 1975, the residence of the ambassador hosted the embassy of South Vietnam, when it was closed. It later donated its film reel collection to the Library of Congress.

== List of ambassadors ==
Term start	Term end	Ambassador	Vietnam rulers	U.S. Presidents	Biography
(South Vietnam) Ambassadors of the State of Vietnam / Republic of Vietnam
July 1, 1952	Unknown	Trần Văn Khá	Bảo Đại	Harry S. Truman	Born 1894 in Cochinchina. Tran Van Kha lived in France from 1911 to 1925. After returning to Hanoi, he occupied himself with educational problems. From 1926 to 1945, he was a member of the Colonial Council (Conseiller de l' Assemblée de l'Union Française pour le Viêtnam). In 1939, he became Vice President of the Colonial Council. He turned his attention to economics and became a member of the Municipal Council of Saigon. The ex-Emperor Bảo Đại appointed him to be the Vietnamese ambassador to the United States on March 3, 1952.
August 16, 1954	Unknown	Trần Văn Chương	Ngô Đình Diệm	Dwight D. Eisenhower	Trần Văn Chương (1898–1986) was from a prominent Vietnamese family. His father was Tran Van Thong, governor of Hải Dương Province, and his mother was Bui Thi Lan, sister of Bui Quang Chieu, who in 1923 founded the Đảng Lập hiến Đông Dương (Constitutional Party). Chuong was also the younger brother of Trần Văn Đỗ (1903–1990), who served as South Vietnam's Foreign Minister from 1965 to 1967. In July 1954, Trần Văn Chương became the minister of state in Ngô Đình Diệm's first government but was quickly sent to Washington to replace Trần Văn Khá as the Vietnamese ambassador. He remained ambassador until his resignation on August 22, 1963, amid the Buddhist Crisis and immediately after the Xá Lợi Pagoda raids.
December 15, 1964	Unknown	Trần Thiện Khiêm	Phan Khắc Sửu	Lyndon B. Johnson	Born December 15, 1925 in Saigon. He was from a Roman Catholic family and was the godson of Archbishop Ngô Đình Thục.
December 16, 1965	Unknown	Vũ Văn Thái	Nguyễn Văn Thiệu	Lyndon B. Johnson	Born January 26, 1919, in Hanoi. He was the Director General of the Budget and Foreign Aid. He attended secondary school in Vietnam. From 1939 to 1944, he attended Ecole Centrale des Arts et Manufacturers, Paris (licence ès sciences). From 1944 to 1946, he attended the National Center of Scientific Research, Paris, on scholarship. From 1946 to 1949, he was the Laboratory Chief, National. He was married to a French woman, the former Simone Garoute; they had three daughters.
January 19, 1967	Unknown	Bùi Diễm	Nguyễn Văn Thiệu	Lyndon B. Johnson	Born 1923 in Phu Ly. The son of a scholar who had supported the patriotic movement led by Phan Châu Trinh and later held several important posts in the Communist-dominated government of North Vietnam, Diêm graduated from the prestigious Thăng Long School in Hanoi and then studied in France. He later held several important posts in the RVN.
June 16, 1972	1972	Nguyen Hoan	Nguyễn Văn Thiệu	Richard Nixon	Chargé d'affaires ad interim
July 21, 1972	May 21, 1975	Trần Kim Phượng	Nguyễn Văn Thiệu	Richard Nixon	Born November 5, 1926, in Hanoi. He holds degrees in Agricultural Sciences from the University of Paris, and in International Relations from the Sciences Po, Paris. The embassy closed on May 21, 1975.
Fall of Saigon, no diplomatic relations (1975–1997)
Ambassadors of the Socialist Republic of Vietnam
May 14, 1997	2001	Le Van Bang	Võ Văn Kiệt	Bill Clinton	Born June 30, 1947, in Ninh Binh Province. Married, two children.
October 10, 2001	2007	Nguyen Tam Chien	Phan Văn Khải	George W. Bush	Born January 20, 1948, in Nghe An Province. Bachelor of Science in Electrical and Mechanical Engineering (Engineering University, Soviet Union; 1972), Master of Arts in International Relations (Moscow Diplomacy Academy; 1984). Married, three children.
January 22, 2008	2011	Le Cong Phung	Nguyễn Minh Triết	George W. Bush	Born February 20, 1948, in Thanh Hoa Province. Married, two children.
July 7, 2011	2014	Nguyen Quoc Cuong	Nguyễn Minh Triết	Barack Obama	Born October 6, 1959, in Hanoi. University of Foreign Affairs (1981), Master of Arts in International Relations (Fletcher School of Law and Diplomacy; 1997). Married, two children.
February 23, 2015	2018	Pham Quang Vinh	Nguyễn Minh Triết	Barack Obama	Born in 1958, grew up in Hanoi. University of Foreign Affairs (1980), Master of Arts in International Relations (University of Canberra; 1985). Married to Hoang Bich Lien, two children.
September 17, 2018	February 16, 2022	Hà Kim Ngọc	Trần Đại Quang	Donald Trump	Born 1963 in Hanoi. Diplomatic Academy of Vietnam (1985), Master of Arts in International Relations (DAV; 2010). Married to Nguyen Thi Phuong Lien, two children.
September 17, 2018	February 16, 2022	Hà Kim Ngọc	Nguyễn Phú Trọng	Donald Trump	Born 1963 in Hanoi. Diplomatic Academy of Vietnam (1985), Master of Arts in International Relations (DAV; 2010). Married to Nguyen Thi Phuong Lien, two children.
September 17, 2018	February 16, 2022	Hà Kim Ngọc	Nguyễn Phú Trọng	Joe Biden	Born 1963 in Hanoi. Diplomatic Academy of Vietnam (1985), Master of Arts in International Relations (DAV; 2010). Married to Nguyen Thi Phuong Lien, two children.
September 17, 2018	February 16, 2022	Hà Kim Ngọc	Nguyễn Xuân Phúc	Joe Biden	Born 1963 in Hanoi. Diplomatic Academy of Vietnam (1985), Master of Arts in International Relations (DAV; 2010). Married to Nguyen Thi Phuong Lien, two children.
February 16, 2022	Present	Nguyễn Quốc Dũng	Nguyễn Xuân Phúc	Joe Biden	Born 1963 in Hanoi. Diplomatic Academy of Vietnam (1985), Master of Arts in International Relations (DAV; 2010). Married to Nguyen Thi Phuong Lien, two children.

== See also ==
- Vietnam–United States relations
- U.S.-South Vietnam relations
