= Embassy of Vietnam, Washington, D.C. =

Embassy of Viet Nam in Washington D.C.
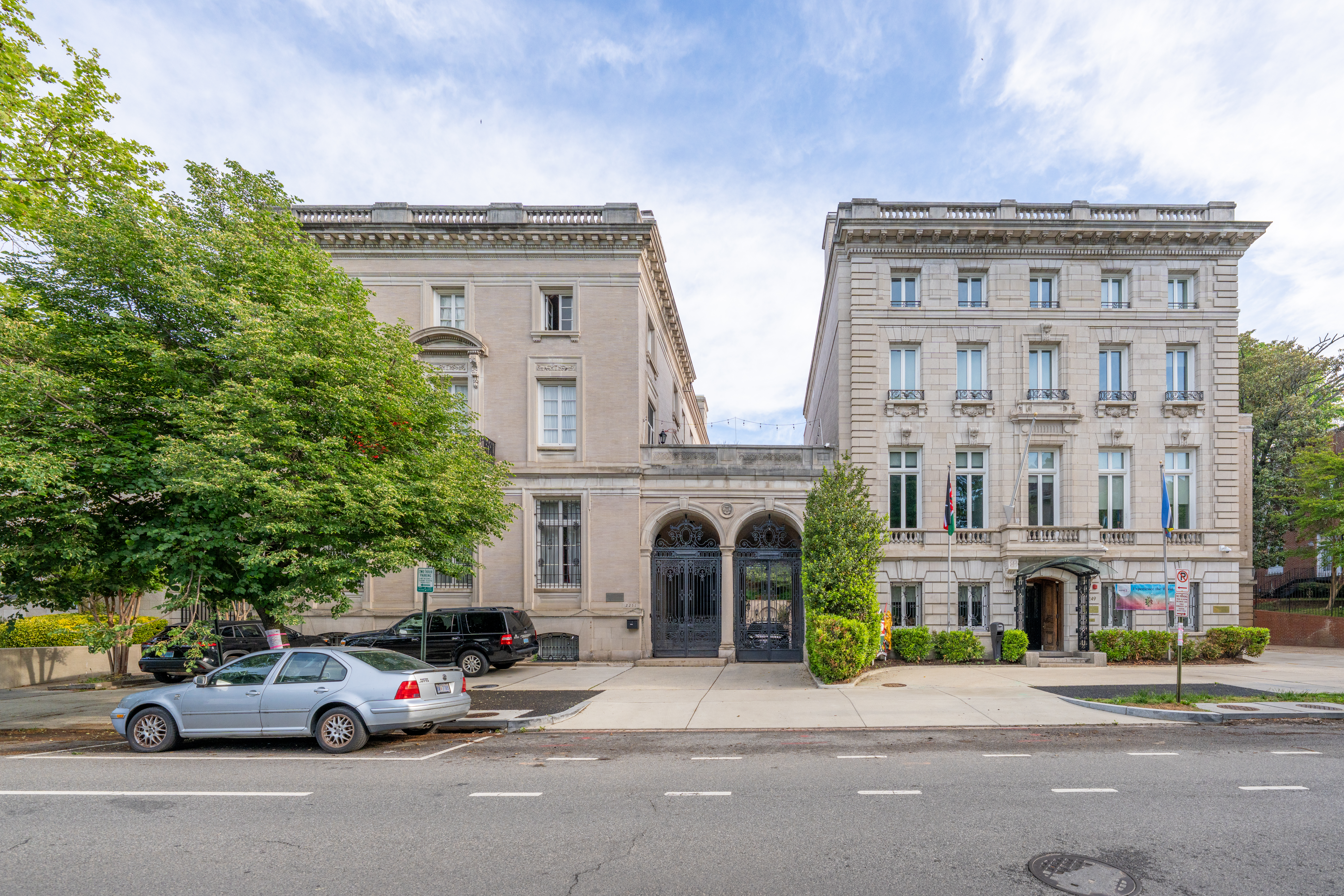
- The Vietnamese Embassy, as seen in 2026.
- Location: Lion Building
- Opened: August 6, 1995
- Ambassador: Nguyễn Quốc Dũng

The Vietnamese Embassy in Washington, D.C. (Vietnamese: Đại sứ quán Việt Nam tại Washington D.C) is the diplomatic mission of the Socialist Republic of Vietnam to the United States. Located in the Lion Building, the embassy was inaugurated on August 6, 1995, the same day as the U.S. Embassy in Hanoi. The current Vietnamese Ambassador to the United States is Nguyễn Quốc Dũng.

== Location ==
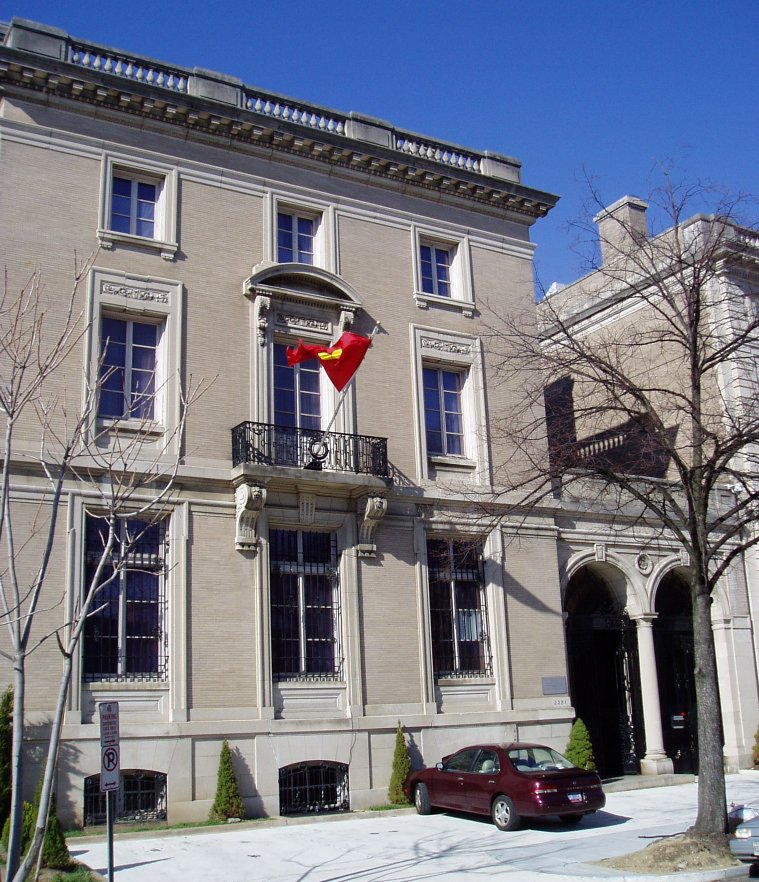
The Ambassador's Residence

The ambassador's residence is at 2251 R Street, Northwest, Washington, D.C. The building housed the Embassy of South Vietnam from the 1950s until May 23, 1975, when it was closed. It later donated its Vietnamese film reel collection to the Library of Congress. The embassy also operates a Consulate-General in San Francisco.

In 2022, Vietnam completed negotiations to purchase $23.7 million site for a new embassy location at 3330 Garfield Street in Washington, D.C. The property is the former site of the Embassy of Belgium.

== See also ==
- United States–Vietnam relations
