= Trần Văn Khá =

Vietnamese diplomat

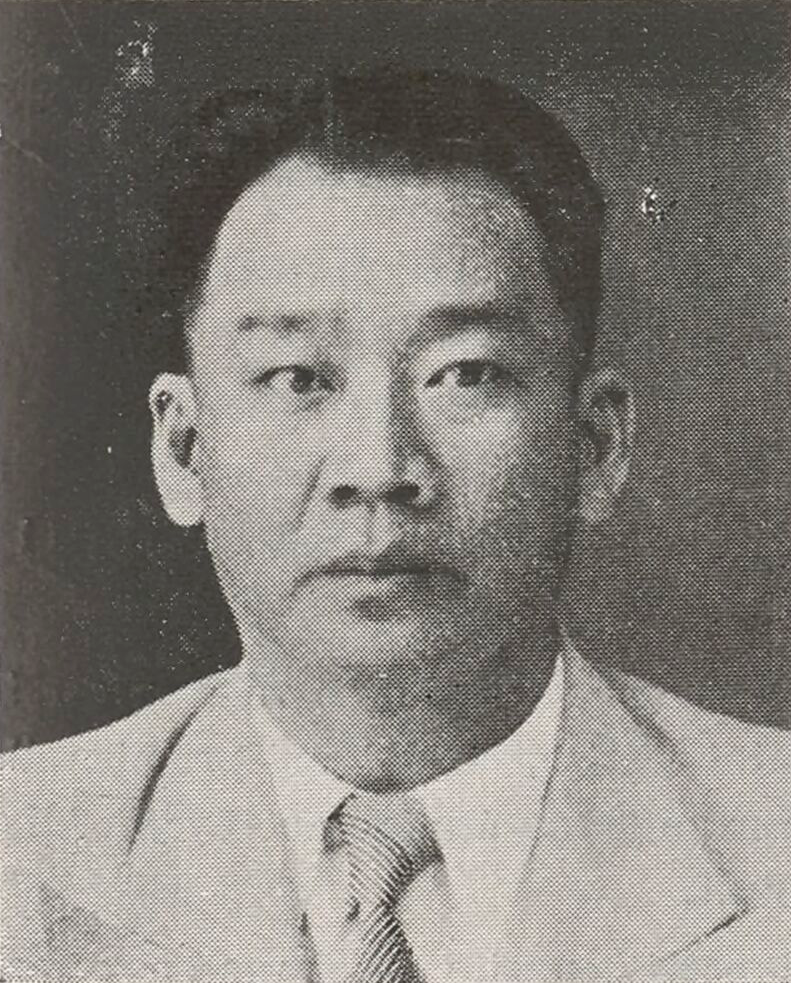
- Trần Văn Khá in 1943

State of Vietnam Ambassador to the United States
- In office 1 July 1952 – 1954
- Chief of State: Bảo Đại
- Preceded by: Office established
- Succeeded by: Trần Văn Chương

Personal details
- Born: 1894 Saigon, French Indochina
- Died: Unknown

Trần Văn Khá was a Vietnamese educator and diplomat, served as the State of Vietnam's first ambassador to the United States.

== Life ==
Trần Văn Khá was born in Saigon, French Cochinchina in 1894.

From 1911 to 1925, Trần Văn Khá lived in Paris, France, working for the French War Department's Colonial Labor Directorate (Direction des travailleurs coloniaux). After returning to Saigon in 1925, he was mainly engaged in teaching and youth education issues, especially sports and scouting activities.

Trần Văn Khá once participated in the meeting of the Colombo Plan initiated by the Commonwealth of Nations.

After the armistice between France and Germany, he was elected to the Saigon City Council and to the Standing Committee of the French Indochina Congress.

On 2 March 1952, Trần Văn Khá was appointed as Vietnam's first ambassador to the United States. Before leaving for the United States, he arrived in Hong Kong on 29 April to visit friends in Hong Kong and bid farewell to them. He flew out of Hong Kong and returned to Saigon on 4 May.

On 15 June, he arrived in New York City. On 19 June, the Vietnamese Embassy in the United States was officially opened and he took office. On 1 July, he submitted his credentials to U.S. President Harry S. Truman.

After the establishment of the State of Vietnam in 1949, Trần Văn Khá served as the national economic minister after the reorganization of Trần Văn Hữu's cabinet on 21 February 1951.

In 1954, he resigned and returned to Vietnam to take up a new position.

== Family ==
Trần Văn Khá's father-in-law was the governor Nguyễn Văn Vịnh.

== See also ==
- List of ambassadors of Vietnam to the United States

Diplomatic posts
Preceded by Embassy established	Ambassador of State of Vietnam to United States; 1952–1954	Succeeded by Trần Văn Chương
