= Bùi Diễm =

South Vietnamese diplomat (1923–2021)

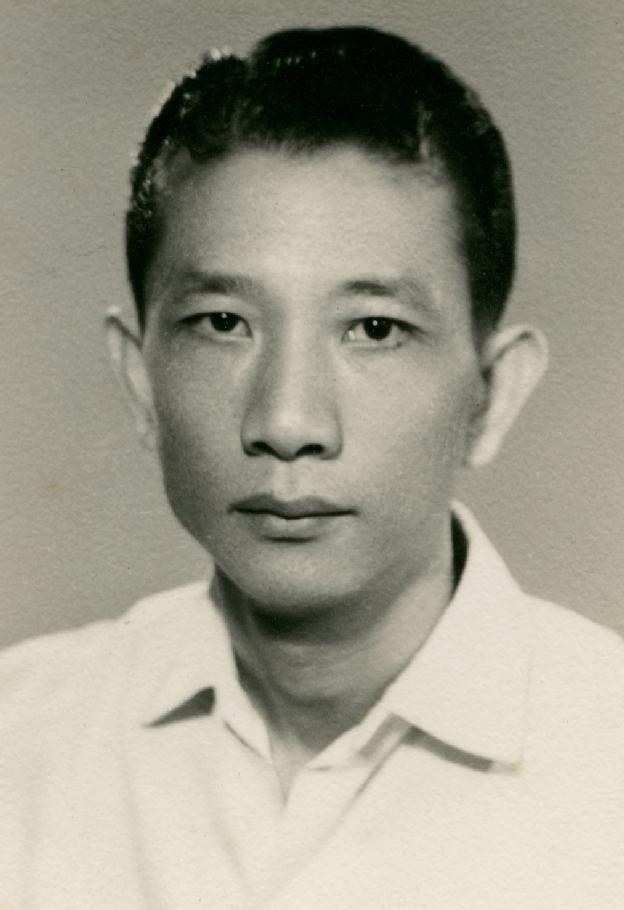
- Bùi Diễm in 1940

South Vietnamese Ambassador to the United States
- In office 19 January 1967 – 1972
- President: Nguyễn Văn Thiệu
- Preceded by: Vũ Văn Thái
- Succeeded by: Trần Kim Phượng

Personal details
- Born: 1 October 1923 Phủ Lý, Hà Nam, Tonkin
- Died: 24 October 2021 (aged 98) Rockville, Maryland, U.S.

Bùi Diễm (1 October 1923 – 24 October 2021) was a South Vietnamese diplomat who served as South Vietnam's ambassador to the United States under President Nguyễn Văn Thiệu from 1965 to 1972, then re-appointed ambassador-at-large and served until 1975. He played a key role in the last desperate attempt to secure US$700 million in military aid to defend South Vietnam against the North in 1975.

Bui Diem was born in Phủ Lý, Hà Nam, French Indochina, on October 1, 1923. He was the nephew of Trần Trọng Kim, who served as the Prime Minister of the Empire of Vietnam under Emperor Bảo Đại in 1945. Diem had been active in politics since he studied at the Lycée du Protectorat and joined the Đại Việt Nationalist Party (Đảng Đại Việt) in 1944 through the introduction of a friend. At age 31, Bui Diem became a member of the State of Vietnam’s delegation to the 1954 Geneva Conference. He also founded the Saigon Post newspaper in South Vietnam, which operated from 1963 to 1975, and was a member of the negotiating team appointed by President Nguyễn Văn Thiệu at the Paris Peace Accords. In 1973, concerned about the threat of the United States Congress to cut off spending for the Vietnam War, Diem was sent by President Thieu as a delegation to Washington to set out South Vietnam's position on the peace talks.

Bui Diem and Anna Chennault acted as intermediaries between President Thieu and Richard Nixon in the "Anna Chennault Affair" to delay peace negotiations in Paris, creating an opportunity to help then-Republican candidate Nixon win the 1968 United States presidential election. President Johnson forced the FBI, CIA, and NSA to monitor Diem and Chennault's activities. For his part, Bui Diem repeatedly denied making any deals with the Nixon campaign to sabotage the peace talks.

After the fall of Saigon in 1975, he settled in the United States, living in Rockville, Maryland, and running a Jewish delicatessen. He wrote articles and worked for the RAND Corporation, then borrowed money and was a part- owner of Goldberg's Delly in downtown Washington until 1982.

He was a scholar at the Woodrow Wilson International Center for Scholars and at the American Enterprise Institute, as well as a research professor at George Mason University. Bui Diem was interviewed by Stanley Karnow for Vietnam: A Television History, where he recounts in an allegation that Lyndon B. Johnson had unilaterally deployed Marine ground troops into South Vietnam without consulting the South Vietnamese government.

Bui Diem was the author of the book In the Jaws of History (1987), and appeared as a witness in Ken Burns's series The Vietnam War, produced by PBS in 2017. He had three children, two daughters and a son. Diem spoke fluent English and French. He died in Rockville, Maryland, on 24 October 2021, at the age of 98.

== Publication ==
- Bui, Diem; Chanoff, David (1999) [1987]. In the Jaws of History. Bloomington, Indiana: Indiana University Press. ISBN 9780253213013.
- Bùi Diễm (2019) [2000]. Gọng Kìm Lịch Sử. Westminster, California: Việt Tide. ISBN 9780991093786.

Diplomatic posts
Preceded by Vũ Văn Thái	Ambassador of Republic of Vietnam to United States; 1967–1972	Succeeded by Trần Kim Phượng
