= Trần Kim Phượng =

South Vietnamese diplomat (1926–2004)

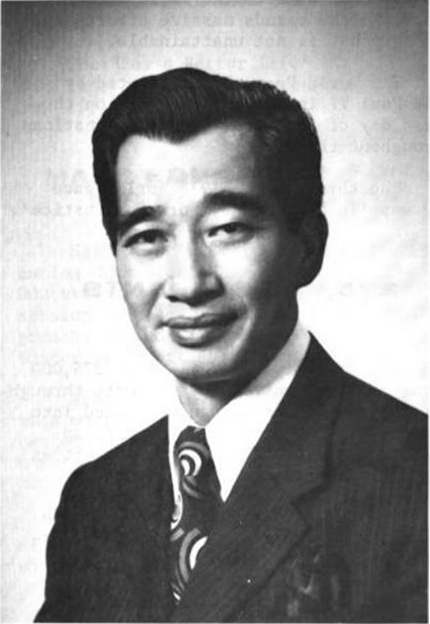

South Vietnamese Ambassador to the United States
- In office 21 July 1972 – 21 May 1975
- President: Nguyễn Văn Thiệu; Trần Văn Hương; Dương Văn Minh
- Preceded by: Bùi Diễm
- Succeeded by: Mission terminated

South Vietnamese Ambassador to Australia
- In office 1967–1970
- President: Nguyễn Văn Thiệu
- Preceded by: Nguyễn Văn Hiếu
- Succeeded by: Đỗ Trọng Chu

South Vietnamese Ambassador to Malaysia
- In office 1964–1967
- Preceded by: Tăng Văn Chỉ
- Succeeded by: Nguyễn Duy Quang

Personal details
- Born: 5 November 1926 Hanoi, Tonkin, French Indochina
- Died: 1 April 2004 (aged 77) Potomac, Maryland, U.S.
- Children: 2

Trần Kim Phượng (5 November 1926 – 1 April 2004) was the last ambassador of the Republic of Vietnam to the United States, serving from 1972 to the Fall of Saigon.

== Biography ==
=== Early years ===
Trần Kim Phượng was born on 5 November 1926 in Hanoi, French Indochina.

=== Studies ===
He studied agricultural science at the University of Paris and international relations in Sciences Po.

=== Diplomatic career ===
In 1955, he served at the Ministry of Foreign Affairs as Deputy Director for Economic and Financial Affairs and from 1957 to 1959 he was First Secretary at the Washington Embassy and Special Representative to the International Cooperation Administration.

He served as Chargé d'affaires to Malaysia from 1959 to 1964 and Ambassador to Malaysia from 1964 to 1967.

He was Ambassador to Australia from 1967 to 1970, concurrently to New Zealand.

He returned to Saigon and worked as Assistant to the Minister of Foreign Affairs and then Vice-Minister until being appointed as Ambassador to the United States, presenting his credentials to President Richard Nixon on 21 July 1972.

=== Exile ===
On 2 April 1975, before the end of South Vietnam, Trần Kim Phượng said during an interview that "It is fatal to be allies of the U.S.... This is a conclusion that people in the world would draw."

After the Fall of Saigon on 30 April 1975, the South Vietnamese Embassy in the United States was closed on 21 May.

After that Trần Kim Phượng lived in the United States until his death on 1 April 2004 in Potomac, Maryland.

== Family ==
Trần Kim Phượng was married and had 2 children.

Diplomatic posts
Preceded by Bùi Diễm	Ambassador of Republic of Vietnam to United States; 1972–1975	Succeeded by Mission terminated
