= Trần Văn Chương =

South Vietnamese diplomat (1898–1986)

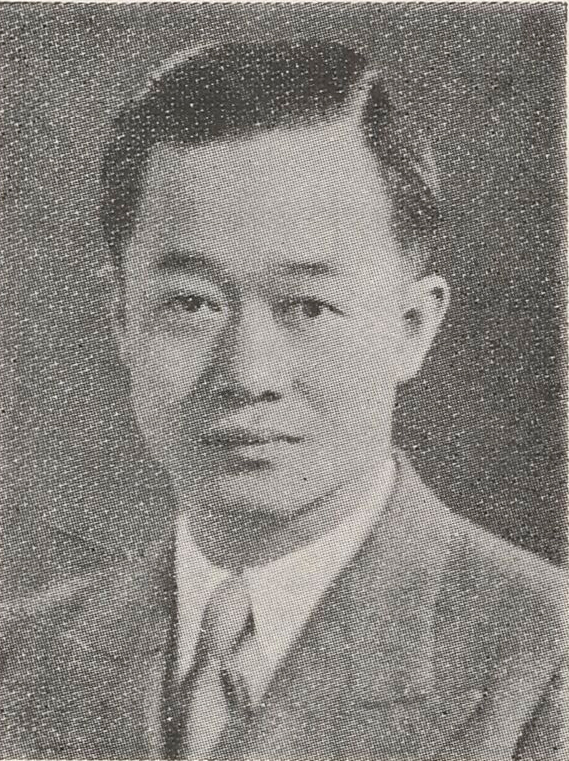

South Vietnamese Ambassador to the United States
- In office 16 August 1954 – 22 August 1963
- President: Ngô Đình Diệm
- Preceded by: Trần Văn Khá
- Succeeded by: Trần Thiện Khiêm

Deputy Chief of cabinet of the Empire of Vietnam
- In office 17 April 1945 – 23 August 1945
- Chief of cabinet: Trần Trọng Kim

Minister of Foreign Affairs of the Empire of Vietnam
- In office 17 April 1945 – 23 August 1945
- Monarch: Bảo Đại
- Chief of cabinet: Trần Trọng Kim
- Succeeded by: Ho Chi Minh

Personal details
- Born: 2 June 1898
- Died: 24 July 1986 (aged 88) Washington, D.C., U.S.
- Spouse: Thân Thị Nam Trân
- Children: 4, including Lệ Xuân, Trần Văn Khiêm

Trần Văn Chương (Vietnamese pronunciation: [t͡ɕən˨˩ van˧˧ t͡ɕɨəŋ˧˧]; 2 June 1898 – 24 July 1986) was South Vietnam's ambassador to the United States from 1954 to 1963 and the father of the country's de facto first lady, Madame Nhu (1924–2011). He was also the foreign minister of the Empire of Vietnam, a Japanese puppet state that existed in 1945.

== Family life ==
He married Thân Thị Nam Trân (died 24 July 1986), who was a member of the extended Vietnamese royal family. Her father was Thân Trọng Huề, who became Vietnam's minister for national education, and her mother was a daughter of Emperor Đồng Khánh. They had a son and two daughters, including Lệ Xuân, who became the wife of Ngô Đình Nhu, the brother of South Vietnam's first President, Ngô Đình Diệm.

Chương's family alliances enabled him to rise from being a member of a small law practice in the Cochin-Chinese (South Vietnamese) town of Bạc Liêu in the 1920s to become Vietnam's first Foreign Secretary under his wife's cousin Emperor Bảo Đại, while Japan occupied Vietnam during World War II. His wife Madame Chương was accused by the French secret police (French Sûreté) of sleeping with Japanese diplomats so her husband was hired by them. He eventually became South Vietnam's ambassador to the United States, but resigned in protest and denounced his government's anti-Buddhist policies after the Xá Lợi Pagoda raids. He proclaimed there was “not one chance in a hundred for victory” over the Communists with his daughter and her husband and brother-in-law in power.

== 1963 South Vietnamese coup d'état ==
On 1 November 1963, Chương's son-in-law Ngô Đình Nhu and Nhu's brother, President Ngô Đình Diệm were assassinated in a coup d'état led by General Dương Văn Minh. Chương's daughter, Ngô Đình Nhu's wife, Madame Nhu (1924–2011), was in Beverly Hills, California, at the time of the coup.

== Death ==
Chương and his wife remained in the United States in Washington, D.C. On 24 July 1986, their strangled bodies were found at their home. Their son, Trần Văn Khiêm, was accused but found incompetent to stand trial. The remains of Chương and his wife were interred at Rock Creek Cemetery in Washington, D.C.

Diplomatic posts
Preceded by Post created	Minister of Foreign Affairs; 1945	Succeeded by Ho Chi Minh (in SRV)
Preceded by Trần Văn Khá	Ambassador of Republic of Vietnam to United States; 1954–1963	Succeeded by Trần Thiện Khiêm
