= Vũ Văn Thái =

South Vietnamese diplomat (1919–1994)

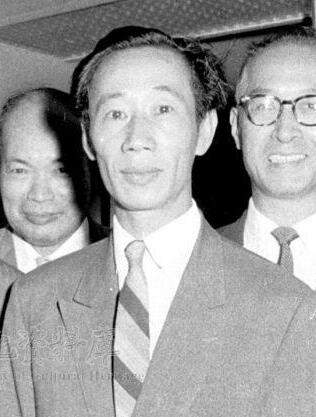
- Thái in Taipei, 1960

South Vietnamese Ambassador to the United States
- In office 16 December 1965 – December 1966
- President: Nguyễn Văn Thiệu
- Preceded by: Trần Thiện Khiêm
- Succeeded by: Bùi Diễm

Personal details
- Born: 26 January 1919 Hanoi, French Indochina
- Died: 19 April 1994 (aged 75) Saint-Tropez, France
- Spouse: Simone Garoute
- Children: 3
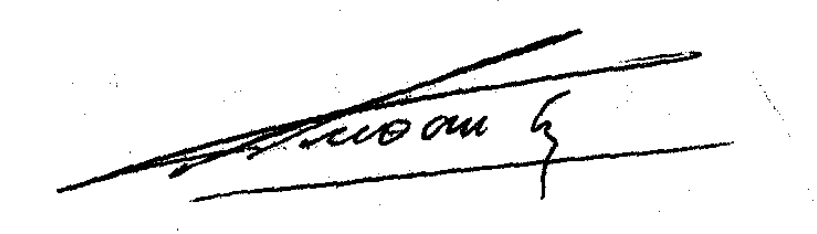
- Signature

Vũ Văn Thái (26 January 1919 – 19 April 1994) was a Vietnamese engineer and economist, and former Ambassador of the Republic of Vietnam to the United States.

== Life ==
=== Early life ===
Vũ Văn Thái was born on 26 January 1919 in Hanoi, the capital of Tonkin protectorate, French Indochina.

After receiving secondary education in Vietnam, Vũ Văn Thái went to France to study. From 1939 to 1944, he studied at the Ecole Polytechnique in Paris and received a diploma in science. From 1944 to 1946, he entered the National Scientific Research Center on a scholarship. From 1946 to 1949, Vũ Văn Thái served as laboratory director at the National Scientific Research Center. He graduated from Sorbonne University in 1954 with a Master of Science diploma.

Although Vũ Văn Thái's father, a famous Vietnamese textile manufacturer, was murdered by the Việt Minh in 1947, As a Viet Minh sympathizer, Vũ Văn Thái supported the Viet Minh's resistance to the French colonialists in the late 1940s and early 1950s. During this period, he served as Hồ Chí Minh's adviser in the negotiations for Vietnam's independence. When efforts to negotiate failed, fighting broke out between the Việt Minh and the French, and Vũ Văn Thái left the Việt Minh after confirming their communist nature.

=== Political career ===
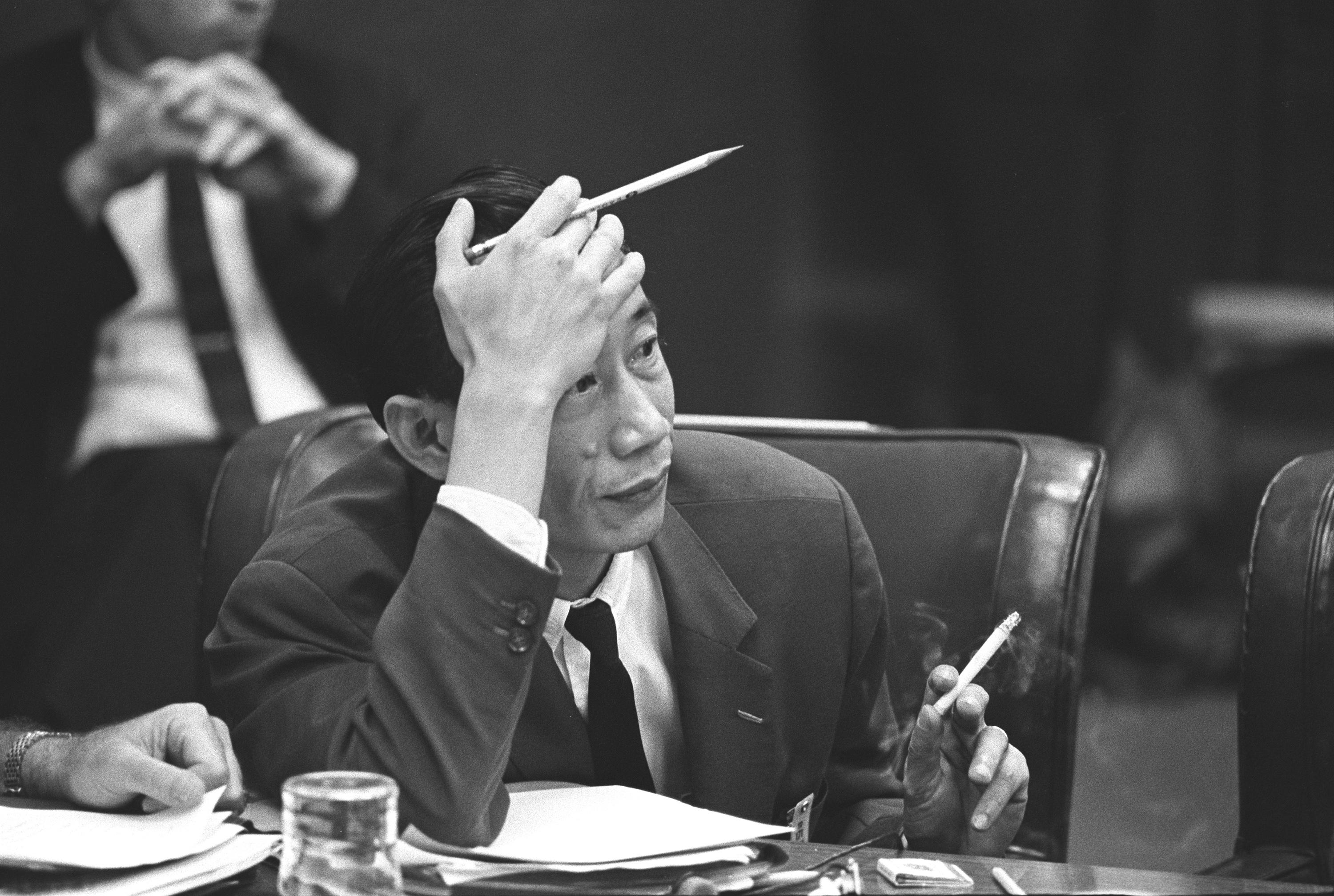
Vo Man Thai attending the Honolulu Conference in 1966

After the Geneva Conference in 1954, Vũ Văn Thái joined the government of the State of Vietnam.He successively served as the director of the Tonggan Dam Reconstruction Planning Bureau, and director of the Budget and Foreign Aid Bureau. (Note: 越南語：Tổng Nha Ngân Sách và Ngọai Viện) In 1961, a conflict broke out between Vũ Văn Thái and Ngô Đình Diệm, and he resigned from the government. He then moved to the United Nations Secretariat, where he served first as a consultant in the Finance and Financial Sector and then as a consultant to the Government of Togo.

After Diệm was overthrown by a coup, Vũ Văn Thái returned to Vietnam and was appointed ambassador to the United States, but he declined the appointment after Nguyễn Khánh launched a military coup and returned to the United Nations Secretariat and was appointed as the United Nations Department of Economic and Social Affairs

In 1965, Vũ Văn Thái served as the third Ambassador of the Republic of Vietnam to the United States, and submitted his credentials to U.S. President Lyndon B. Johnson on 16 December 1965. In December 1966, Vũ Văn Thái was replaced as ambassador to the United States.

On 19 April 1994, Vũ Văn Thái passed away in Saint-Tropez, France.

== Family ==
His wife, Simone Garoute, is French, and they have three daughters.

== Notes ==
Diplomatic posts
| Preceded by Trần Thiện Khiêm | Ambassador of Republic of Vietnam to United States; 1965–1966 | Succeeded by Bùi Diễm |
