= Australia–Vietnam relations =

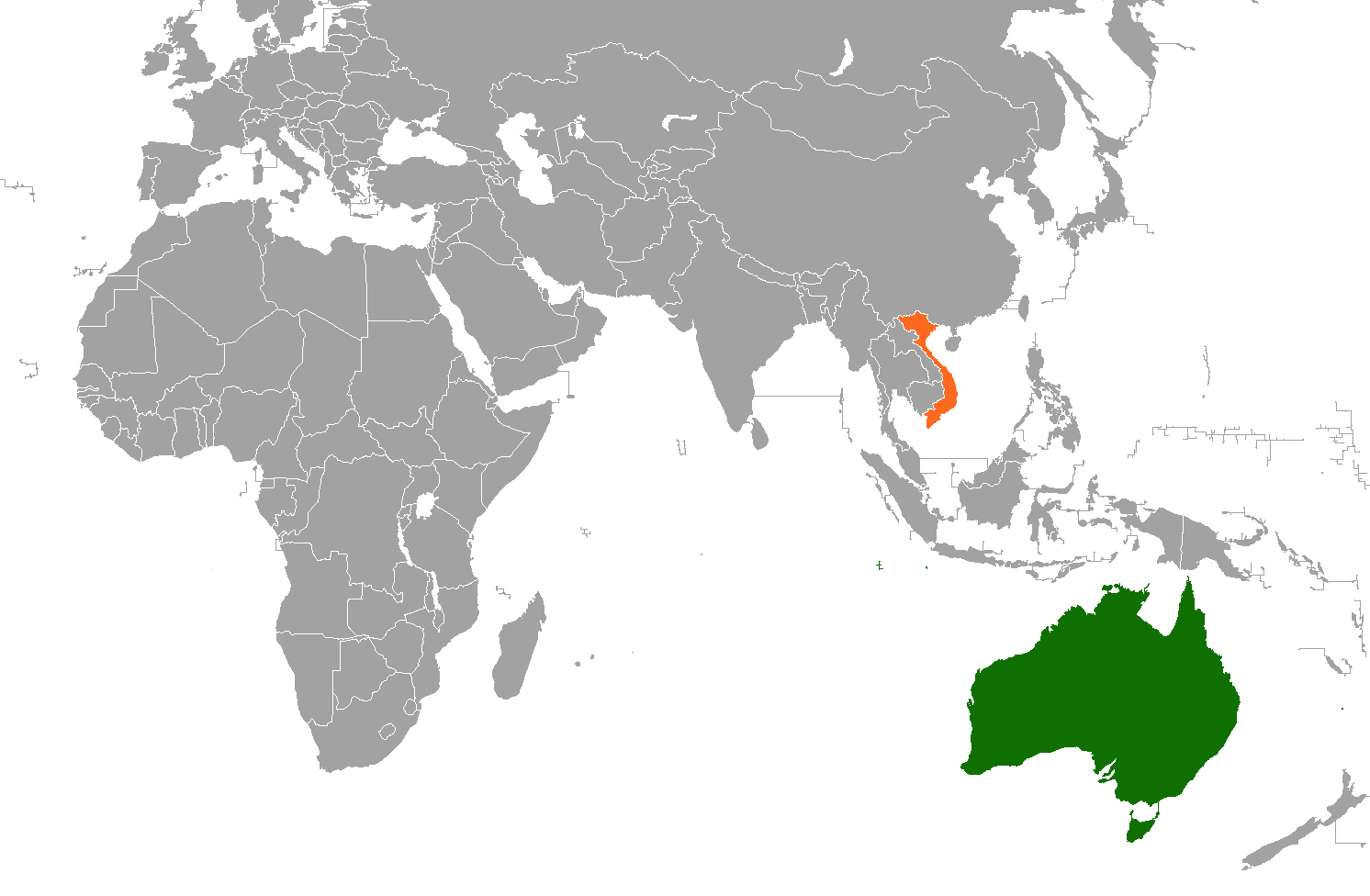

- Australia: Vietnam

Foreign relations exist between Australia and Vietnam. Australia has an embassy in Hanoi and a consulate in Ho Chi Minh City. Vietnam has an embassy in Canberra.

== History ==
=== Vietnam War and aftermath ===
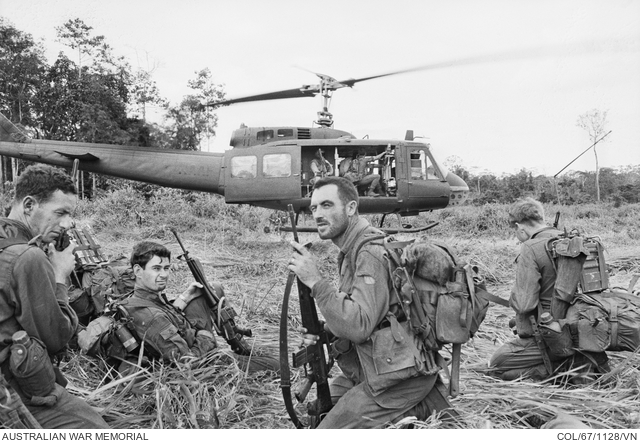
Members of the 7th Battalion, Royal Australian Regiment in Vietnam, November 1967

Australia participated in the Vietnam War as part of a United States led-intervention to Vietnam to assist South Vietnam against North Vietnam. Australia committed 50,000 troops in the country, in which 520 were killed. The war had a deep effect on Australian society.

== Modern day ==
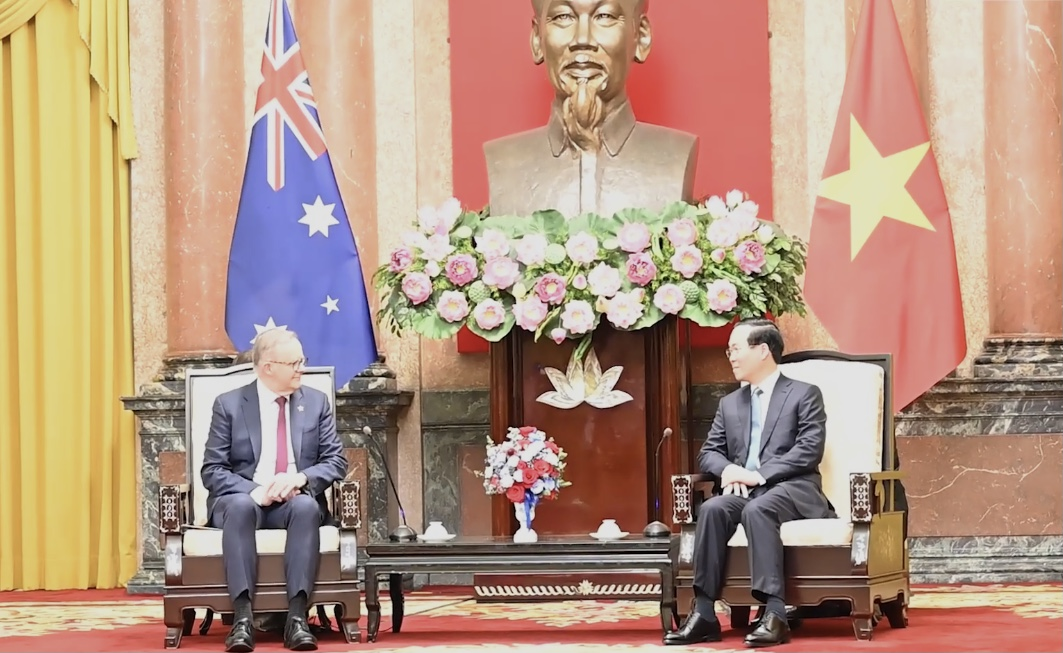
Australian Prime Minister Anthony Albanese with Vietnamese President Võ Văn Thưởng in Hanoi, Vietnam, June 2023

At the end of the Cold War and Vietnam's normalisation of foreign relations, Australia soon deepened its relationship with Vietnam. Vietnam is now one of the world's fastest growing economies, and Australia's strategic partner, both being members of CPTPP and a popular destination for Australians, many of whom are former soldiers at the Vietnam War.

The 2001 to 2011 General Secretary, Nông Đức Mạnh, visited Australia in 2009, upgrading their relationship to “comprehensive partnership”. In 2018, to mark the 45th anniversary of diplomatic relations, this was upgraded further to a “strategic partnership”.

On 11 August 2026, as part of the broader Australia–Vietnam Comprehensive Strategic Partnership Agreements, the two countries signed a Memorandum of Understanding (MoU) on Cooperation in the Digital Economy, establishing a five-year framework to deepen bilateral cooperation in digital trade, digital transformation, and digital skills. The MoU identifies three priority areas: digital trade and regulation, digital transformation and connectivity, and digital skills, with Vietnam's Ministry of Industry and Trade and Ministry of Science and Technology designated as the lead agencies for implementation.

== Diplomatic representatives ==
=== Vietnamese ambassadors to Australia ===
South Vietnam ambassadors to Australia

1. Trần Văn Lắm (1961–1964)
2. Nguyễn Văn Hiếu (1964–1966)
3. Nghiêm Mỹ (1966–1967, Chargé d'affaires)
4. Trần Kim Phượng (1967–1970)
5. Đỗ Trọng Chu (1970–1972, Chargé d'affaires)
6. Vũ Văn Hiếu (1972–1973, Chargé d'affaires)
7. Nguyễn Phương Thiệp (1973–1974)
8. Đoàn Bá Cang (1974–1975, until the Fall of Saigon)

== Resident diplomatic missions ==
Of Vietnam

- Canberra (Embassy)
- Sydney (Consulate)
- Perth (Consulate)

Of Australia

- Hanoi (Embassy)
- Ho Chi Minh City (Consulate)

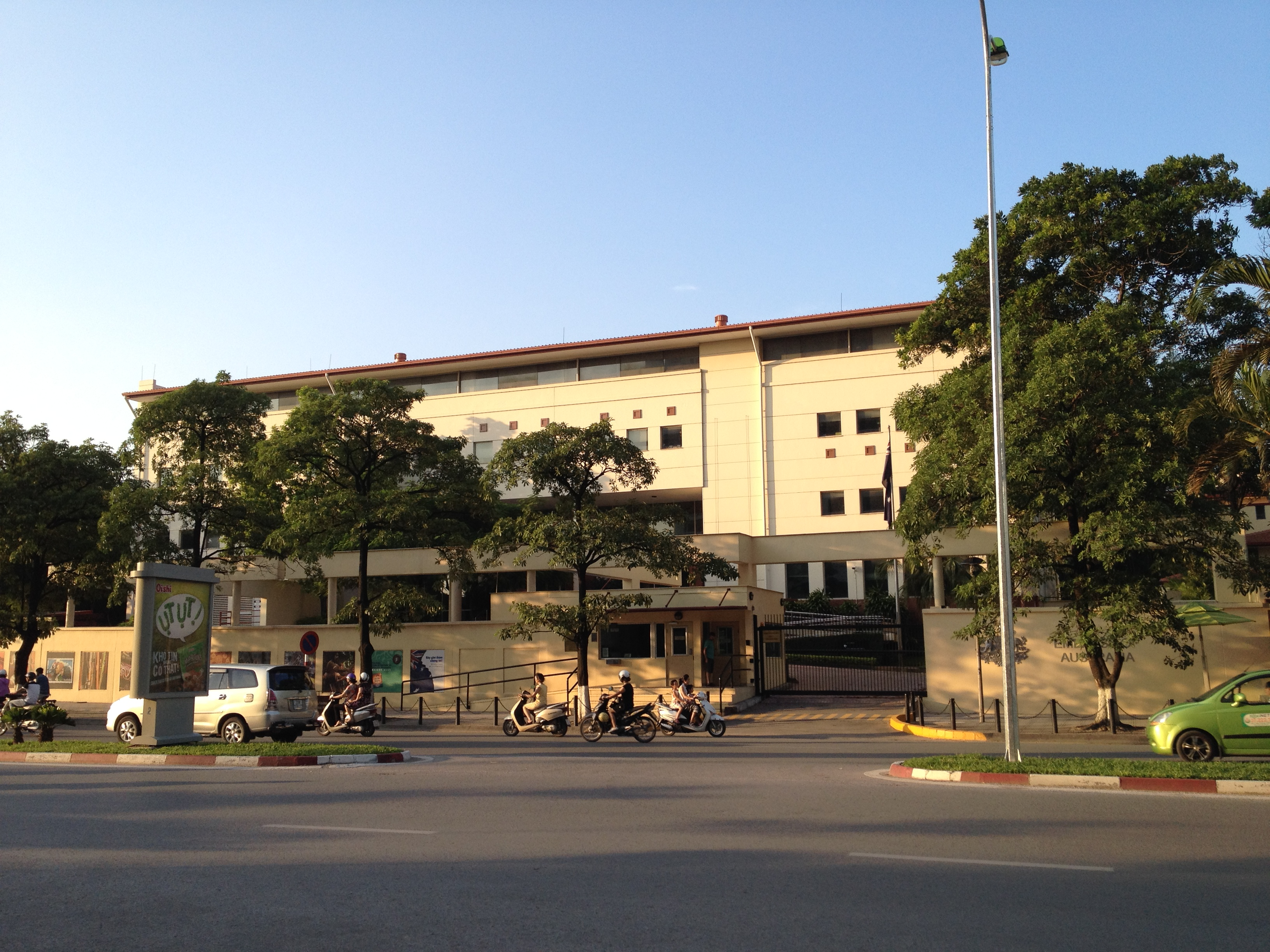
Embassy of Australia in Hanoi

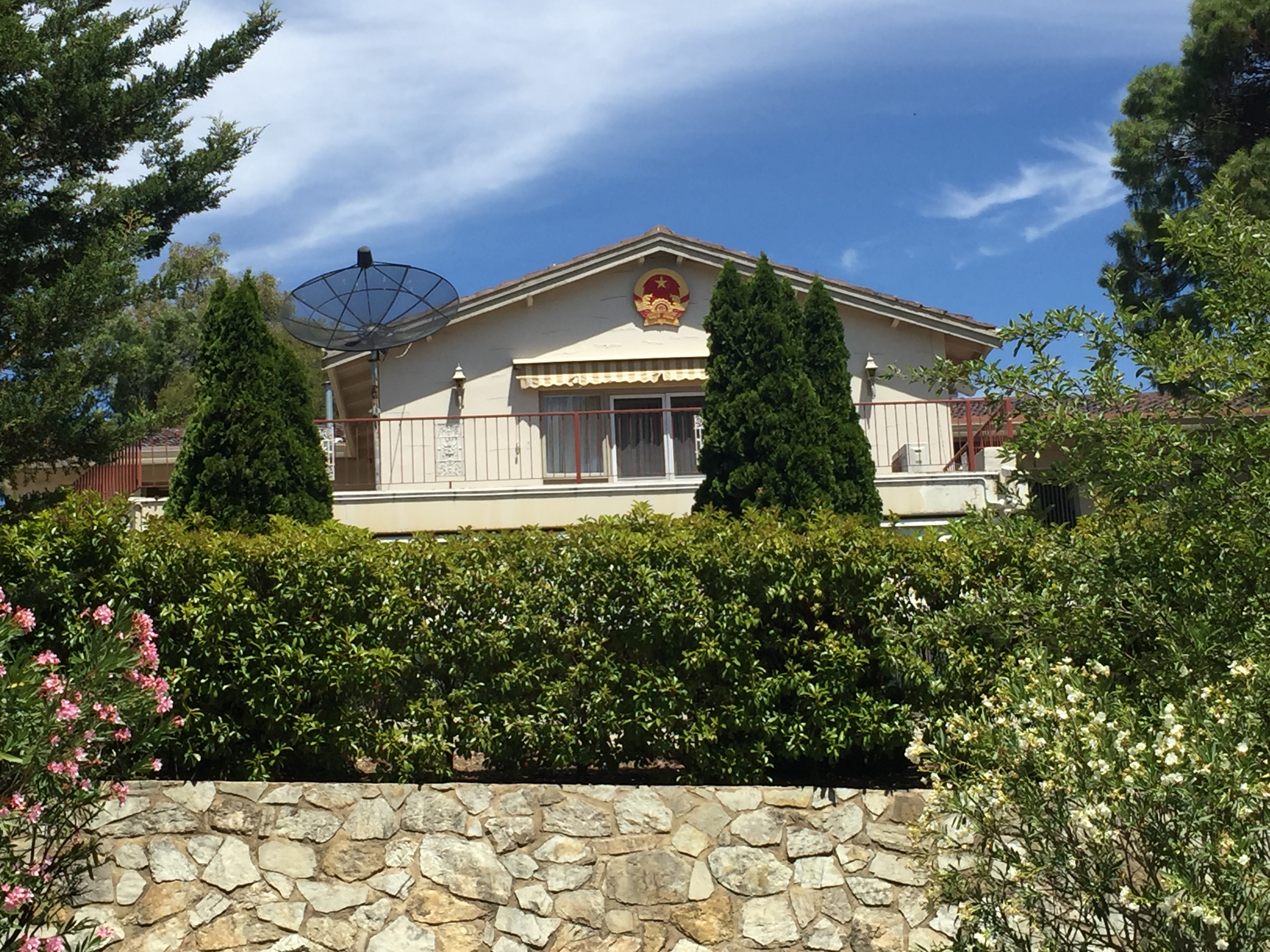
Embassy of Vietnam in Canberra

== See also ==
- Australia–Vietnam Comprehensive Strategic Partnership Agreements
- Ngo Dinh Diem presidential visit to Australia
- Foreign relations of Australia
- Foreign relations of Vietnam
- Vietnamese Australians
