= Australia–Vietnam Comprehensive Strategic Partnership Agreements =

2026 bilateral agreements between Australia and Vietnam

Joint Statements and Memoranda of Understanding between Australia and Vietnam
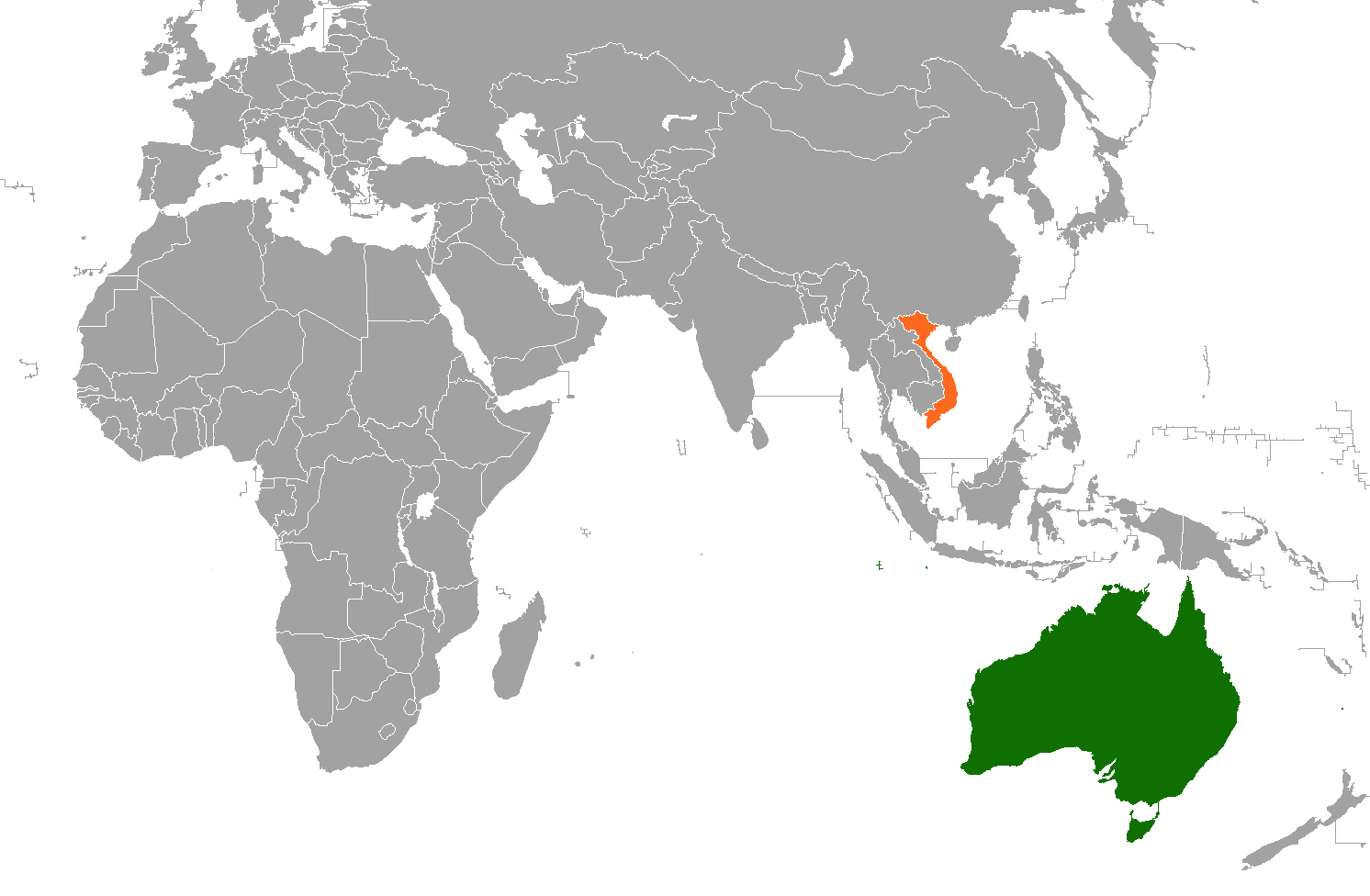
- Location of Australia and Vietnam
- Type: Joint statements and memoranda of understanding
- Signed: 11 August 2026
- Parties: Australia and Vietnam
- Language: English and Vietnamese

The Australia–Vietnam Comprehensive Strategic Partnership Agreements are a series of joint statements and memoranda of understanding between Australia and Vietnam concerning cooperation in digital economy, agriculture, maritime law enforcement, border protection, vocational training, healthcare, and air services. They were signed on 11 August 2026 during the state visit of Vietnamese General Secretary and President To Lam to Australia.

The agreements build upon the Comprehensive Strategic Partnership established between the two countries in March 2024. The most detailed of the documents is a five-year memorandum of understanding on digital economy cooperation, which identifies priority areas including digital trade, digital transformation, and digital skills.

The agreements do not constitute a treaty under international law but represent political commitments to deepen bilateral cooperation. Implementation is to be carried out by designated representative agencies in each country.

== Background ==
Australia and Vietnam have shared diplomatic relations since 1973. The relationship was elevated to a Comprehensive Strategic Partnership on 7 March 2024 during a visit by Australian Prime Minister Anthony Albanese to Vietnam.

The bilateral economic relationship had been underpinned by the Australia–Vietnam Enhanced Economic Engagement Strategy (EEES), signed by the prime ministers of both countries on 1 November 2021. The EEES identified digital economy cooperation as a priority area for enhancing economic ties.

The digital economy had become an increasingly important sector for both countries. Australia and Vietnam recognized digital technologies and digital trade as enablers of economic growth, development, and social wellbeing.

Before the August 2026 agreements, Australia and Vietnam had been engaged in efforts to strengthen digital trade commitments through regional and multilateral frameworks, including the AANZFTA e-commerce upgrade negotiations and the ASEAN-Australia Digital Trade Standards initiative.

== Joint Statements ==
On 11 August 2026, General Secretary and President To Lam and Prime Minister Anthony Albanese exchanged three joint statements covering the breadth of the bilateral relationship.

The first was a Joint Statement on deepening the Vietnam-Australia Comprehensive Strategic Partnership, which outlined the overarching framework for continued collaboration across political, economic, and security domains.

The second was a Joint Statement on improving the resilience, adaptability and recovery capacity of Vietnamese and Australian economies, addressing economic cooperation in the face of global challenges including supply chain disruptions and climate change.

The third was a Joint Statement on enhancing science, technology, and innovation connectivity between Vietnam and Australia.

== Cooperation Documents ==
In addition to the three joint statements, the two leaders witnessed the exchange of seven cooperation documents across various sectors.

The documents included memoranda of understanding on agriculture and rural development, maritime law enforcement, border protection, vocational training, healthcare, and digital economy, as well as a protocol amending the bilateral air services agreement.

== Digital Economy Memorandum of Understanding ==
The Memorandum of Understanding on Digital Economy Cooperation was one of the seven documents signed on 11 August 2026. It established a framework for collaboration in a sector considered vital for the future economic growth of both nations.

=== Objectives ===
The memorandum set out several objectives, including deepening bilateral relations under the Comprehensive Strategic Partnership, promoting interoperability of regulatory frameworks based on international standards, building on multilateral and regional cooperation on digital economy, sharing information on emerging technologies, and facilitating business-to-business and research links.

=== Priority areas ===
The agreement identified three priority areas for cooperation.

The first priority area was digital trade and regulation of the digital economy. This included sharing best practices on policy matters such as personal data protection, data governance, cross-border data flows, online consumer protection, and promoting paperless trading.

The second priority area was digital transformation, connectivity and investment. This focused on sharing policies for digital transformation, developing digital platforms for key sectors such as finance, agriculture, transportation, education, and healthcare, fostering high-quality investment in digital infrastructure, and building capacity in emerging technologies like artificial intelligence and semiconductors.

The third priority area was digital skills. This focused on sharing best practices for developing digital workforce skills, enhancing digital literacy for the general population, particularly in rural and remote areas, and supporting cooperation between Australian and Vietnamese universities.

=== Representative agencies ===
Under the agreement, Vietnam's Ministry of Industry and Trade was made responsible for cooperation on digital trade and regulation of the digital economy. Vietnam's Ministry of Science and Technology was made responsible for cooperation on digital transformation, connectivity, and digital skills. Australia's Department of Foreign Affairs and Trade was made responsible for coordination across relevant Australian government agencies.

=== Implementation ===
The memorandum provided for cooperation activities to be undertaken through exchanging information and sharing experiences, joint research and training, encouraging industry development and collaboration, and participating in regional and international fora.

A separate project document or documents were to provide the operational aspects, expected outcomes, work schedules, budgets and financial arrangements for specific cooperative activities.

The memorandum was to remain in effect for a period of five years unless terminated by either party with at least six months' written notice.

=== Status ===
The memorandum represented the understandings reached between the participants and was not a treaty under international law. It did not create legally binding rights or obligations for either country.

The memorandum was to be implemented in accordance with the relevant laws and regulations of each country and the treaties to which each country was a party.

== Other cooperation documents ==
=== Agriculture ===
A memorandum of understanding on cooperation in agriculture and rural development was signed between Vietnam's Ministry of Agriculture and Environment and Australia's Department of Agriculture, Fisheries and Forestry.

=== Maritime law enforcement ===
A memorandum of understanding on cooperation in maritime law enforcement was signed between the Vietnam Coast Guard and the Australian Border Force.

=== Border protection ===
A memorandum of understanding on strengthening border protection cooperation and mutual assistance was signed between Vietnam's Border Guard High Command, under the Ministry of National Defense, and the Australian Border Force.

=== Vocational training ===
A memorandum of understanding on vocational training cooperation was signed between Vietnam's Ministry of Education and Training and Australia's Department of Employment and Workplace Relations.

=== Healthcare ===
A memorandum of understanding on healthcare cooperation was signed between Vietnam's Ministry of Health and Australia's Department of Health, Disability, and Ageing.

=== Air services ===
A protocol to amend and supplement the Agreement on Air Services between the two governments was also signed.

== Reactions ==
=== Vietnam ===
The Vietnamese government presented the agreements as a significant step in deepening the Comprehensive Strategic Partnership with Australia. The exchange of documents was described as reflecting the breadth and depth of bilateral cooperation.

=== Australia ===
The Australian government welcomed the agreements. The digital economy memorandum was described as building on existing initiatives and providing a framework for a package of digital trade cooperation.

Australia had previously committed to providing funding for activities under the digital economy work plan while encouraging co-contribution from Vietnam.

== Strategic significance ==
The agreements had implications for both countries. For Vietnam, the arrangements provided a framework for cooperating with a major developed economy on digital transformation and economic modernization. For Australia, the agreements deepened engagement with a rapidly growing economy in Southeast Asia.

The digital economy cooperation was particularly significant because it addressed regulatory issues, infrastructure development, and workforce skills, which were all considered important for maximizing the benefits of digital trade and economic integration.

The agreements also built on broader cooperation between Australia and Vietnam in regional and multilateral fora, including the World Trade Organization and ASEAN-related frameworks.

The agreements were therefore part of a wider pattern of deepening Australia-Vietnam relations that had seen the relationship elevated to a Comprehensive Strategic Partnership in March 2024.

== See also ==
- Australia–Vietnam relations
- Comprehensive strategic partnership
- Digital economy
- Foreign relations of Australia
- Foreign relations of Vietnam
