= Lion Building =

Vietnamese Embassy in DC, U.S

Lion Building, Washington, D.C.
- Interactive map of the Lion Building, Washington, D.C. area

General information
- Location: Washington, D.C., 1233 20th Street, N.W.
- Coordinates: 38°54′24″N 77°2′40″W

The Lion Building is an office building and location of the Embassy of Vietnam, Washington, D.C. The building is the former seat of the Republic of South Sudan to the United States. It is located at 1233 20th Street Northwest, Washington, D.C., in the Dupont Circle neighborhood.

== Vietnam ==
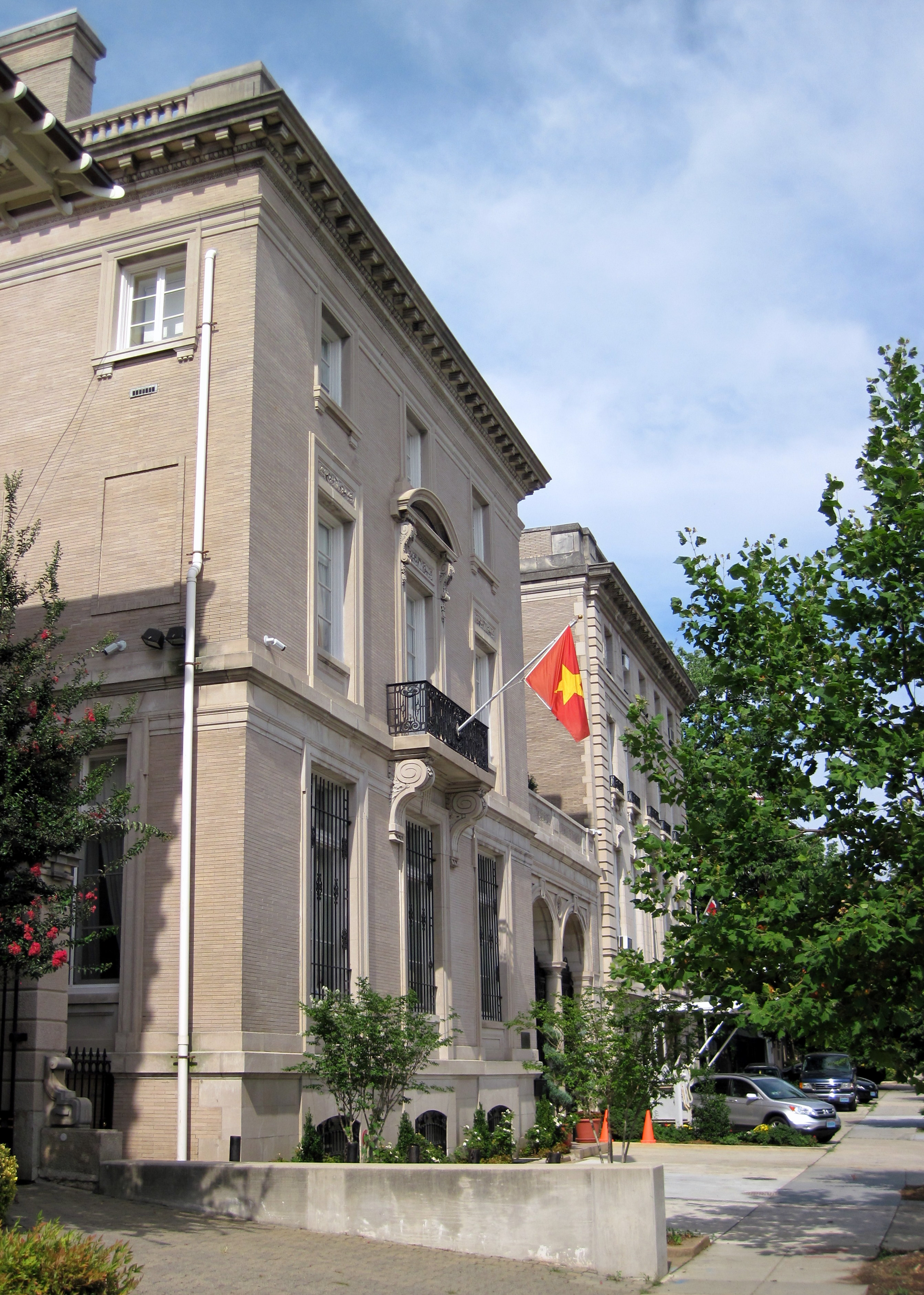
Vietnam Ambassador's Residence

The embassy of the Socialist Republic of Vietnam is located at 1233 20th Street, Suite 400.

== South Sudan ==
The embassy of the Republic of South Sudan was located at 1233 20th Street N.W. Suite 602. However, it has since been moved to 1015 31st Street NW, Suite 300 per the website.

== See also ==
- United States–Vietnam relations
- South Sudan–United States relations
