= Nguyễn Quốc Dũng =

Vietnamese diplomat

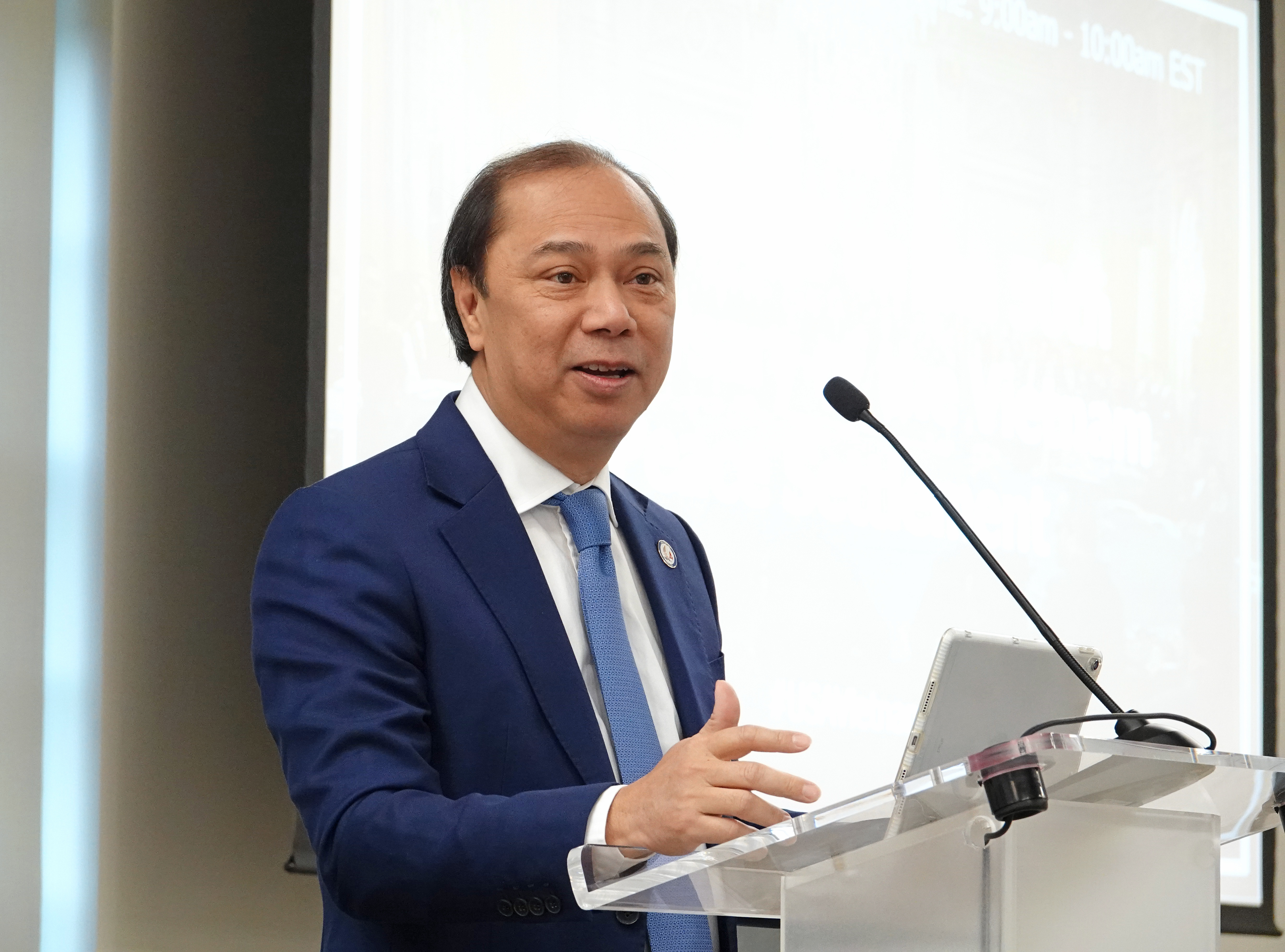
- Nguyễn Quốc Dũng at United States Institute of Peace, 2023

7th Ambassador of Vietnam to the United States
- Incumbent
- Assumed office February 16, 2022
- President: Nguyễn Xuân Phúc; Võ Văn Thưởng; Tô Lâm
- Preceded by: Hà Kim Ngọc

Nguyễn Quốc Dũng is a Vietnamese diplomat, serving as the Vietnamese Ambassador to the United States since 2022. Nguyễn presented his credentials to President Joe Biden on 19 April 2022. Prior to his term, he served at Deputy Foreign Minister from 2016 to 2022.

== Ambassador to the United States ==
Nguyễn was appointed by President Nguyễn Xuân Phúc as Vietnamese Ambassador to the United States in 2022. On September 10, 2023, Vietnam and the United States upgraded formal diplomatic ties to a Comprehensive Strategic Partnership. Nguyễn has criticized the US government's categorization of Vietnam's as a “non-market economy” since 2002.
