= Tongue (disambiguation) =

The tongue is a muscular organ in the mouth of most vertebrate animals.

Tongue or Tongues may also refer to:

== Speech ==
- Language, also called "a tongue"
- Speaking in tongues, or glossolalia
- Tongue-in-cheek, a type of ironic and sarcastic humor
- Tongue twister, a phrase that is difficult to articulate

== Music ==
- The Tongue, or Xannon Shirley, Australian musician
- Tongues (Esham album), 2001
- Tongues (Kieran Hebden and Steve Reid album), 2007
- "Tongue" (song), by R.E.M., 1995
- "Tongue", a song by Seether from the 2005 album Karma and Effect
- "Tongue", a song by Soilwork from the 2013 album The Living Infinite
- "Tongues" (song), by Joywave featuring KOPPS, 2014
- "Tongues", a song by The Chariot from the 2012 album One Wing
- "Tongues", a song by Deathstars from the 2006 album Termination Bliss

== People with the surname ==
=== Law and politics ===
- Carole Tongue (born 1955), British politician and former European Parliament member
- Thomas H. Tongue (1844–1903), American politician and attorney
- Thomas Tongue (1912–1994), American jurist

=== Sports ===
- Alan Tongue (born 1980), Australian rugby player
- Josh Tongue (born 1997), English cricketer
- Nicholas Tongue (born 1973), swimmer from New Zealand
- Reggie Tongue (born 1973), American football player
- Reggie Tongue (racing driver) (1912–1992)

== Places ==
- Tongue, Highland, Scotland
- Kyle of Tongue, a sea loch in Highland, Scotland
- Tongué, Mali
- Tongue of the Ocean, a deep water region in the Bahamas
- Tongue River (disambiguation)
- Tongue Wash, Nevada, United States
- Lisan Peninsula, a geographic feature in the Dead Sea whose name in Arabic means "tongue"

== Other uses ==
- Tongue (foodstuff), a dish made of a cow's tongue
- Tongues (play), a 1978 play by Sam Shepard and Joseph Chaikin
- Tongue (Knights Hospitaller), an administrative division of the Catholic military order
- Part of a shoe to seal the laced opening
- Part of a tow hitch device

== See also ==
- Tong (disambiguation)
- Tung (disambiguation)
- Tang (disambiguation)
- Mother tongue (disambiguation)
- Old Tongue (disambiguation)
- Ice tongue, projecting out from a coastline
- Tongue and groove, a method of fitting similar objects together
- Tonguing, a wind instrument technique
- Tongue kiss or tonguing, an erotic act
