= Tongzhou =

Tongzhou may refer to:

== Modern locations ==
- Tongzhou District, Beijing (通州区), named after a historical prefecture
- Tongzhou District, Nantong (通州区), Jiangsu, named after a historical prefecture
- Tongzhou, Guizhou (通州镇), town in and subdivision of Pingtang County, Guizhou

== Historical locations ==
- Tong Prefecture (Shaanxi) (同州), a prefecture between the 6th and 20th centuries in modern Shaanxi

== See also ==
- Tong (disambiguation)
- Zhou Tong (disambiguation)
