= Tang =

Tang or TANG most often refers to:

- Tang dynasty
- Sour taste

Tang or TANG may also refer to:

== Chinese states and dynasties ==
- Jin (Chinese state) (11th century – 376 BC), a state during the Spring and Autumn period, called Tang (唐) before 8th century BC
- Tang dynasty (唐; 618–907), a major Chinese dynasty
- Later Tang (唐; 923–937), a state during the Five Dynasties and Ten Kingdoms period
- Southern Tang (唐; 937–975), a state during the Five Dynasties and Ten Kingdoms period

== Food ==
- Tang (drink mix), a brand name of instant fruit flavored drinks, produced by Mondelēz International
- Guk (국), soup or stew in Korean cuisine, sometimes known as "tang" (탕; 湯)

== Places ==
=== Europe ===
- Tang, County Westmeath, a village in Ireland
- Tang, North Yorkshire, a settlement in England

=== Asia ===
- Tang, Ardabil, a village in Ardabil Province, Iran
- Tang, Badakhshan, a village in Afghanistan
- Tang, a village in Bumthang District, Bhutan
- Tang (唐镇), a town in Pudong, Shanghai, China
- Tang, Sistan and Baluchesstan, a village in Sistan and Baluchesstan Province, Iran
- Tang County (唐县), Baoding, Hebei, China
- Tang Gonda, a village in Khuzestan Province, Iran
- Tang Julan, a village in Khuzestan Province, Iran
- Tang-e Rashid, a village in Khuzestan Province, Iran
- Tang-e Zirgol Bardar, a village in Khuzestan Province, Iran

== People ==
=== Surnames ===
- Táng (surname) (唐), romanized as Tang
- Tāng (surname) (湯/汤), romanized as Tang
- Deng (surname) (鄧/邓), sometimes romanized as Tang
- Teng (surname) (滕), rarely romanized as Tang

=== Other people ===
- Tang of Shang (湯; c. 1675 – 1646 BC), first king of the Shang Dynasty
- Tang Chinese, used in southern China to refer to the Han Chinese
- Tang Clan (鄧族) of Hong Kong, among the first inhabitants to settle in Hong Kong

== Ships ==
- US submarines named after the fish, including
  - Tang-class submarine of the United States Navy
    - USS Tang (SS-563), the lead ship of that class
  - USS Tang (SS-306), a United States Navy Balao-class submarine that served briefly in World War II before being sunk by one of its own torpedoes
- Type 096 submarine Tang class of the People's Liberation Army Navy of the People's Republic of China

== Other uses ==
- Tang (clevis), part of a clevis fastener or joint
- Tang (fish), Acanthuridae, a family of marine fish
- Tang (tools), a projecting element connecting the blade or operational part of a knife or other tool to the handle
- Tang sight, a rear sight attached to a rifle tang
- Tape measure, tang, the hook at the end of a tape measure
- BYD Tang, a car
- Tang, a fish in the American television series FishCenter Live
- Tang, a character in the Cbeebies television show ZingZillas
- Tang and me, Japanese film (2022) adapted from the book "A robot in the garden" by Deborah Install, starring Kazunari Ninomiya from Arashi

== Acronyms ==
- Tennessee Air National Guard
- Texas Air National Guard
- Texas Army National Guard

== See also ==
- Tange (disambiguation)
- Tong (organization)
