= Duke Gardens =

Duke Gardens may refer to

- Duke Gardens (New Jersey)
- Sarah P. Duke Gardens in Durham, North Carolina, United States
