= Xá Lợi Pagoda raids =

1963 attacks on Buddhist pagodas in Vietnam

- Part of the Buddhist crisis in the Vietnam War
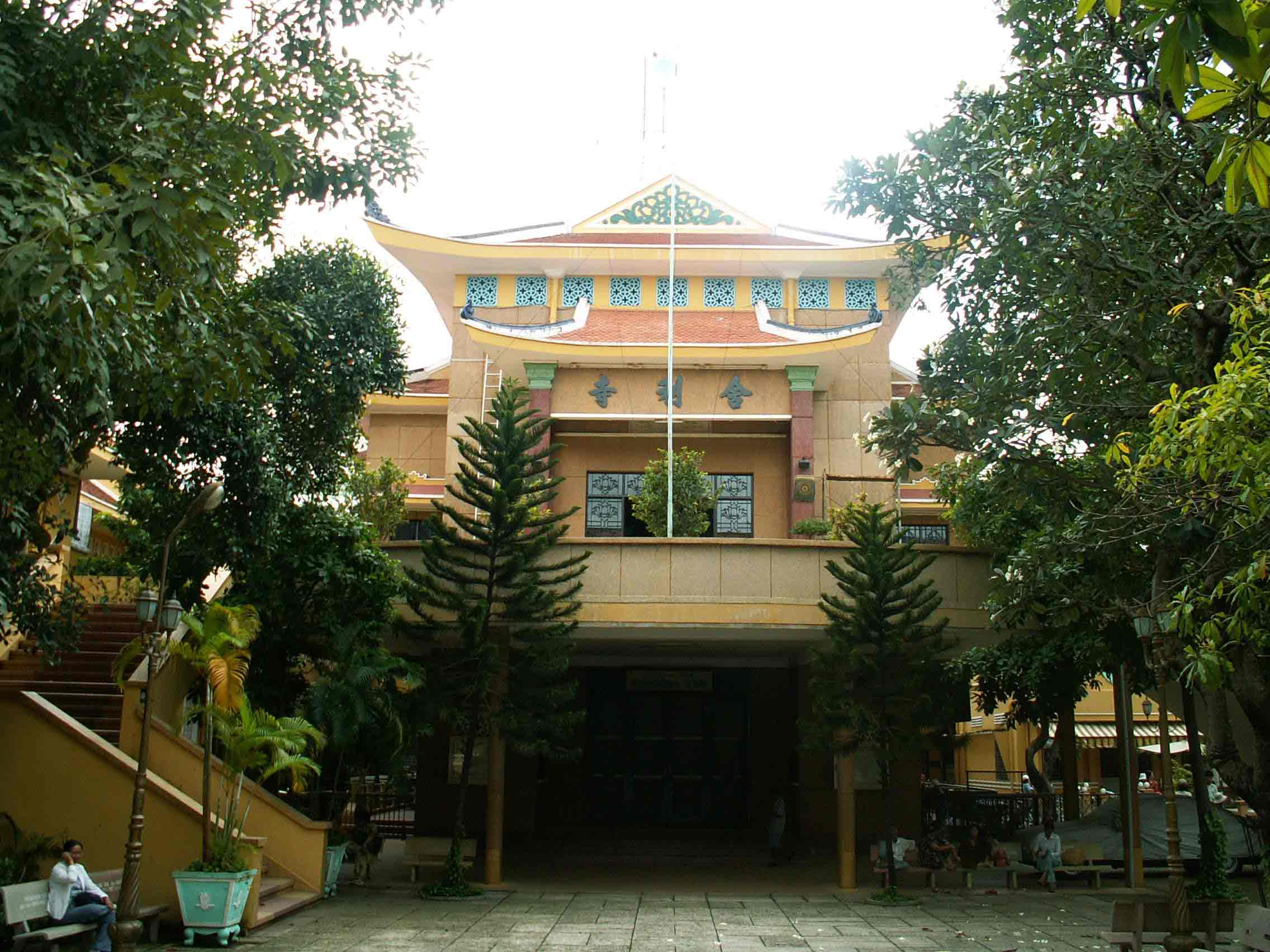
- Xá Lợi Pagoda, the focal point of the attacks
- Location: Several Buddhist temples in South Vietnam, most notably the Xá Lợi Pagoda in Saigon
- Date: 21 August 1963
- Target: Buddhist protestors
- Attack type: Shootings, beatings, temple demolitions
- Deaths: Estimates range up to hundreds
- Injuries: Hundreds
- Perpetrator: Army of the Republic of Vietnam Special Forces under orders from Ngô Đình Nhu

The Xá Lợi Pagoda raids (Vietnamese pronunciation: [saː˦˥ ləːj˨˩˨]) were a series of synchronized attacks on a number of Buddhist pagodas in the major cities of South Vietnam shortly after midnight on 21 August 1963. The raids were executed by the Army of the Republic of Vietnam Special Forces under Colonel Lê Quang Tung and combat police, both of which took their orders directly from Ngô Đình Nhu, the younger brother of the Catholic president Ngô Đình Diệm. The Xá Lợi Pagoda, the largest in the South Vietnamese capital Saigon, was the most prominent of the raided temples. Over 1,400 Buddhists were arrested, and estimates of the death toll and missing ranged up to the hundreds. In response to the Huế Vesak shootings and a ban on the Buddhist flag in early May, South Vietnam's Buddhist majority rose in widespread civil disobedience and protest against the religious bias and discrimination of the Catholic-dominated Diệm government. Buddhist temples in major cities, most prominently the Xá Lợi pagoda, became focal points for protesters and assembly points for Buddhist monks from rural areas.

In August, several Army of the Republic of Vietnam (ARVN) generals proposed the imposition of martial law, ostensibly to break up the demonstrations, but in reality to prepare for a military coup. Nhu, already looking to arrest Buddhist leaders and crush the protest movement, used the opportunity to preempt the generals and embarrass them. He disguised Tung's Special Forces in army uniforms and used them to attack the Buddhists, thereby causing the general public and South Vietnam's U.S. allies to blame the army, diminishing the generals' reputations and ability to act as future national leaders. Soon after midnight on 21 August, Nhu's men attacked the pagodas using automatic firearms, grenades, battering rams and explosives, causing widespread damage. Some religious objects were destroyed, including a statue of Gautama Buddha in the Từ Đàm Pagoda in Huế, which was partially leveled by explosives. Temples were looted and vandalized, with the remains of venerated monks confiscated. In Huế, violent street battles erupted between government forces and rioting pro-Buddhist, anti-government civilians.

The Ngô family claimed the army had carried out the raids, something their U.S. allies initially believed. This was later debunked, but the incident prompted the United States to turn against the regime and begin exploring alternative leadership options, eventually leading to Diệm's overthrow in a November coup. In South Vietnam, the raids stoked widespread anger. Several high-ranking public servants resigned, and university and high school students boycotted classes and staged riotous demonstrations, resulting in further mass incarcerations. As most of the students were from middle-class public service and military families, the arrests caused further upset among the Ngô family's power base.

== Background ==
South Vietnam was often portrayed as having a Buddhist majority, comprising 70% or more of the population. These figures, reported by foreign journalists, were overestimated, as Westerners commonly mistook folk religion for Buddhism. The actual number of Buddhists was much smaller, at most about 27%. Ngo Dinh Diem was regarded by "orthodox" historians as having pursued pro-Catholic policies that antagonized many Buddhists. The government was regarded as being biased towards Catholics in public service and military promotions, as well as the allocation of land and business favors. Allegedly, there were Buddhist villages that tried to convert en masse to avoid being moved during the resettlement program.

The Catholic Church was the largest landowner in the country, and the "private" status that was imposed on Buddhism by the French, which required official permission to conduct public Buddhist activities, was not repealed by Diệm. Allegedly, U.S. aid was disproportionately distributed to Catholic majority villages. Under Diệm, the Catholic Church enjoyed special exemptions in property acquisition, and in 1959, he dedicated the country to the Virgin Mary. The white and gold Catholic flag was allegedly flown at major public events in South Vietnam. However, portrayals by Western media at the time were severely distorted, as Vietnamese Buddhism in fact flourished under Diệm's First Republic.

The Buddhist flag

A rarely enforced 1958 law—known as Decree Number 10—was invoked in May 1963 to prohibit the display of religious flags. This disallowed the flying of the Buddhist flag on Vesak, the birthday of Gautama Buddha. The application of the law caused indignation among Buddhists on the eve of the most important religious festival of the year. This was exacerbated as a week earlier Catholics had been encouraged to display Catholic flags at a government-sponsored celebration for Diem's brother, Archbishop Pierre Martin Ngô Đình Thục, the most senior Catholic cleric in the country. On 8 May in Huế, a crowd of Buddhists protested against the ban on the Buddhist flag. The police and army broke up the demonstration by firing guns at and throwing grenades into the gathering, killing nine people.

Diệm's denial of governmental responsibility for the incident—he instead blamed the Việt Cộng—added to the anger and discontent of the Buddhist majority. The incident spurred a protest movement against the religious discrimination of the Roman Catholic–dominated Diệm regime, resulting in widespread large-scale civil disobedience among the South Vietnamese public persisting throughout May and June. This period of political instability was known as the "Buddhist crisis". The objectives of the protests were to have Decree Number 10 repealed and to force the implementation of religious equality. On 11 June, Buddhist monk Thích Quảng Đức self-immolated in downtown Saigon. Images were shown by news outlets across the world, embarrassing Diệm's government and bringing negative global attention. A few days later, under mounting American pressure, Diệm signed the Joint Communique with senior Buddhist leaders, making various concessions to the Buddhists, who in turn agreed to stop the civil unrest and return to normal life.

Neither the Ngô family nor the Buddhists were happy with the agreement, and it failed to solve the dispute. Both sides accused the other of failing to uphold their obligations; the government accused the Buddhists of continuing to vilify them in demonstrations, while the Buddhists accused Diệm of stalling and not acting on his commitments to religious reform, and continuing to detain arrested Buddhist dissidents. The demonstrations and tension continued throughout July and August, with more self-immolations and an altercation (known as the Double Seven Day scuffle) between secret police and American journalists reporting on a Buddhist protest.

== Xá Lợi ==
The hub of Buddhist activism in Saigon was the Xá Lợi Pagoda. It was the largest Buddhist temple in the capital, located in the city center, and built in the late 1950s. Many monks from outside Saigon—including prominent Buddhist leaders—had congregated at Xá Lợi since the dispute began and it was used as a venue for press conferences, media interviews, publication of pamphlets and to plan and organize mass demonstrations. At the time, Ngô Đình Nhu was known to favor an even harder line against the Buddhists. Nhu was the younger brother of President Diệm and his main confidant, and was regarded as the real power behind the Ngô family's rule. There were persistent reports on Nhu seeking to usurp power from his elder brother and attack the Buddhists. When interviewed about this, Nhu said if the Buddhist crisis was not resolved, he would stage a coup and head a new anti-Buddhist government. The news was promptly published, which the American embassy largely disregarded, purportedly unconvinced as to Nhu's seriousness.

Nhu prepared the Army of the Republic of Vietnam Special Forces commanded by Colonel Lê Quang Tung—who took his orders directly from Nhu and not the senior generals—for the raids. An American-trained outfit created to fight the Việt Cộng, the Special Forces were better-equipped, better-trained and better-paid than the regular army. They were used by the Ngô family as a private army for repressing dissidents and protecting their rule, rather than fighting for the national interest. As such, they spent the majority of their time in Saigon warding off coup attempts. Tung brought more Special Forces into Saigon, bringing the total from two to four battalions in the capital. On Sunday, 18 August, the Buddhists staged a mass protest at Xá Lợi, attracting around 15,000 people. The attendance was approximately three times higher than the previous Sunday's rally. The event lasted for several hours as speeches by the monks interspersed religious ceremonies. A Vietnamese journalist said it was the only emotional public gathering in South Vietnam since Diệm's rise to power almost a decade earlier. David Halberstam of The New York Times speculated the Buddhists were saving their biggest demonstration for the scheduled arrival of the new U.S. ambassador Henry Cabot Lodge Jr. the following week and not exploiting the large crowd by staging a protest march towards the Gia Long Palace or other government buildings.

== Planning ==
On the evening of 18 August, ten senior ARVN generals met to discuss the situation regarding the Buddhist unrest and decided martial law was needed. They wanted to disperse the monks who had gathered in Saigon and other regional cities and return them to their original pagodas in the rural areas. Nhu summoned 7 of the 10 generals to Gia Long Palace on August 20 for consultations. They presented their request for martial law and discussed how to disband the groups of monks and their supporters from the temples in Saigon. Nhu sent the generals to see Diệm, and the president listened to the group of seven led by General Trần Văn Đôn. The group included Army Chief General Trần Thiện Khiêm and General Nguyễn Khánh, commander of the II Corps in the Central Highlands. Also present was Đôn's brother-in-law General Đỗ Cao Trí, commander of I Corps, which oversaw the northernmost region around Huế, and General Lê Văn Kim, head of the military academy. General Tôn Thất Đính, a brash paratrooper, commanded the III Corps surrounding Saigon. General Huỳnh Văn Cao was the commander of the IV Corps in the Mekong Delta.

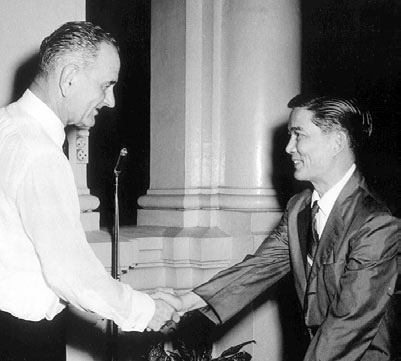
Ngô Đình Nhu, brother of President Ngô Đình Diệm, planned the raids. On the left, U.S. vice president Lyndon Johnson

Trần Văn Đôn claimed communists had infiltrated the monks at Xá Lợi and warned ARVN morale was deteriorating because of civil unrest and the consequent disruption of the war effort. He claimed it was possible the Buddhists could assemble a crowd to march on Gia Long Palace. Diệm agreed to declare martial law effective on the next day without consulting his cabinet, and troops were ordered into Saigon to occupy strategic points. Don was appointed as the acting Chief of the Armed Forces in place of General Lê Văn Tỵ, who was terminally ill with cancer and receiving medical treatment abroad. Đôn claimed Diệm was concerned for the welfare of the monks, allegedly telling the generals he did not want any of them hurt. The martial law orders were then signed and authorized by Đôn. The real purpose of Đôn asking for martial law was to maneuver troops in readiness for a coup, and he had no concrete plans to send the regular army into the pagodas. Nhu sidestepped him and took the opportunity to discredit the army by using Tung's Special Forces and the combat police to attack the pagodas. Đính, the officer most trusted by the Ngô family, was the only general who was given advance notice of the raids.

With the approval of Diệm, Nhu used the declaration of martial law to order armed men into the Buddhist pagodas. Nhu chose a time when he knew the American Embassy was leaderless. Frederick Nolting had returned to the United States and his successor Lodge was yet to arrive. As the high command of the ARVN worked closely with American military advisers deployed in the country, Nhu used the combat police and Tung's Special Forces, who took their orders directly from him. The men were dressed in standard army uniforms such as paratroop attire to frame the regulars for the raids. Nhu's motive was to avoid responsibility for a violent operation which would anger the Vietnamese public and the American leadership. By falsely implicating the army in the attacks, Nhu intended to dent the confidence of the Vietnamese populace and the Americans in the senior officers plotting against him. Nhu evidently hoped the Buddhist majority and the Americans would blame the army for the raids and become less inclined to support a coup by the generals. In the past, Nhu's tactics of playing the generals against one another had kept conspirators off-balance and thwarted coup attempts. The raids were not unexpected, as the Buddhists had prepared themselves for the attacks, as had journalists, who were watching military installations for signs of movement.

== Raids ==
=== Saigon ===
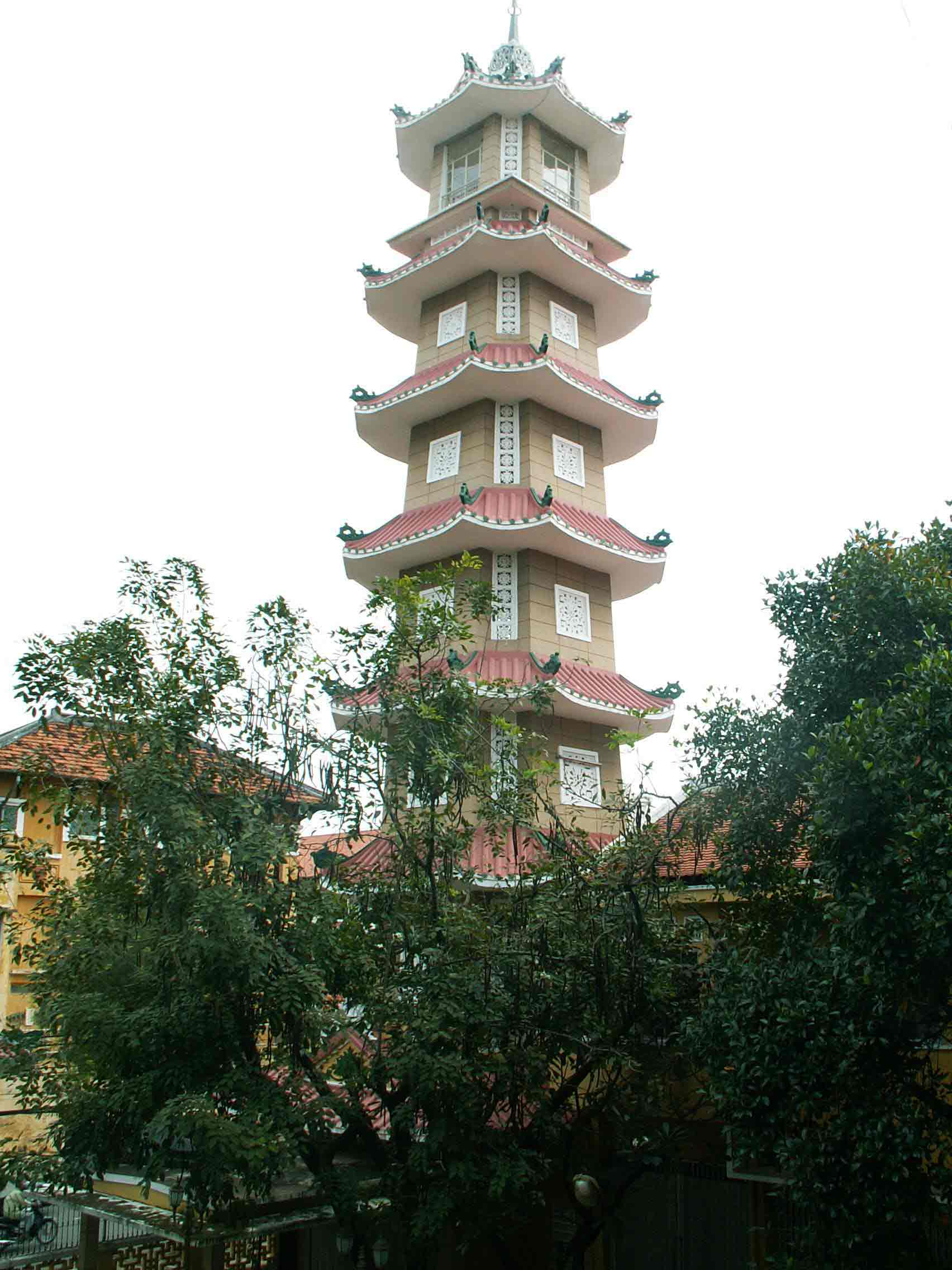
The gong in the bell tower of Xá Lợi was struck continuously to alert the population to the raids.

The Buddhists in Saigon were aware a raid on the pagodas was imminent. Buddhist relatives of Special Forces and combat police personnel had tipped off the monks, and Buddhists who lived near pagodas had observed them move into the region in the lead-up. American journalists were tipped off and traveled through Saigon to visit the pagodas ahead of the raids. The pagodas had been locked by the monks in preparation for the attacks and the doors were barricaded with furniture, and reinforced by nailing wooden planks across them. The monks told members of the U.S. press corps in Saigon the raids were coming, allowing them to be more prepared for the event than the U.S. embassy. In the afternoon before the raids, trucks filled with soldiers headed past the offices of media outlets—where the journalists saw them—destined for the Ấn Quang Pagoda. More troops were seen congregating at police headquarters, ready to board trucks moving towards Xá Lợi. The American-made trucks had been provided as part of the U.S. military aid program for South Vietnam. Late at night, the convoys arrived and surrounded Xá Lợi from several sides, causing a traffic jam in the city center. Several thousand personnel were estimated to have been present. Journalists were informed as soon as the attacks began, even as Nhu's men cut communications lines, and they rushed to Xá Lợi.

Squads of Special Forces and combat police flattened the gates and smashed their way into the pagoda at around 00:20 on 21 August as Xá Lợi's brass gong was struck to signal the attack. Nhu's men were armed with pistols, submachine guns, carbines, shotguns, grenades and tear gas. The red-beret Special Forces were joined by truckloads of steel-helmet combat police in army camouflage uniforms. Two of Nhu's senior aides were seen outside Xá Lợi directing the operation, while Nhu and his wife Madame Nhu watched the action from a nearby tank. Monks and nuns who had barricaded themselves behind wooden shields were attacked with rifle butts and bayonets. The sound of the pagoda's gong was largely masked by that of automatic weapons fire, exploding grenades, battering rams, shattering glass and human screams. The military personnel shouted as they attacked, as did the occupants in fear.

Tung's men charged forward in a V-shaped riot formation. In the end, it took around two hours to complete the raids because many of the occupants had entrenched themselves inside the various rooms in anticipation of the attacks and doors had to be unhinged to reach them. According to journalist Neil Sheehan, who was at the scene, "The raid on Xá Lợi, like those on the pagodas elsewhere in South Vietnam, was flawlessly executed. It reminded me of a scene from a movie of the French Resistance—the scene when the Gestapo arrive at the Resistance hideout in Paris". William Prochnau said "Using the elite guard against the Buddhists was analogous to using Green Berets to put down Negro protests at home. It was outrageous".

One monk was thrown from a balcony down to the courtyard 6 metres (20 ft) below. Nhu's men vandalized the main altar and confiscated the intact charred heart of Thích Quảng Đức, which had failed to burn during his re-cremation. However, some of the Buddhists were able to flee the pagoda with a receptacle containing his ashes. Two monks jumped the back wall of Xá Lợi to enter the grounds of the adjoining United States Agency for International Development (USAID) mission, where they were given asylum, despite the presence of troops behind the pagoda walls who opened fire with automatic weapons on any monks who tried to flee by jumping the fence. Thích Tịnh Khiết, the 80-year-old Buddhist patriarch, was seized and taken to a military hospital on the outskirts of Saigon. As commander of III Corps, General Đính soon announced military control over Saigon, canceling all commercial flights into the city and instituting press censorship. Later, Thích Quảng Độ, one of the leading arrested monks, explained the Buddhist leadership did not flee to avoid arrest because they feared it would appear to be an admission of their guilt.

=== Huế ===
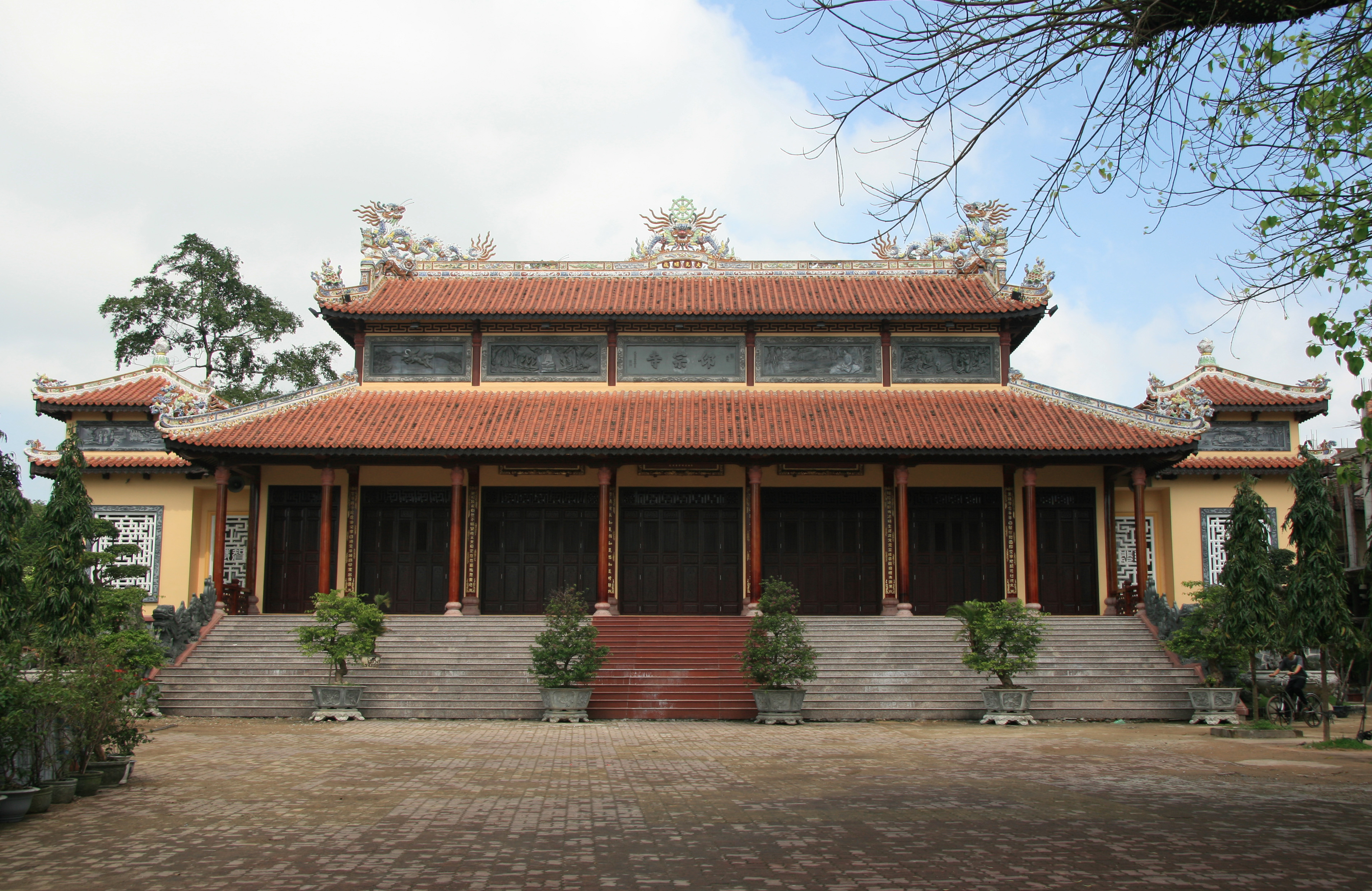
Từ Đàm Pagoda

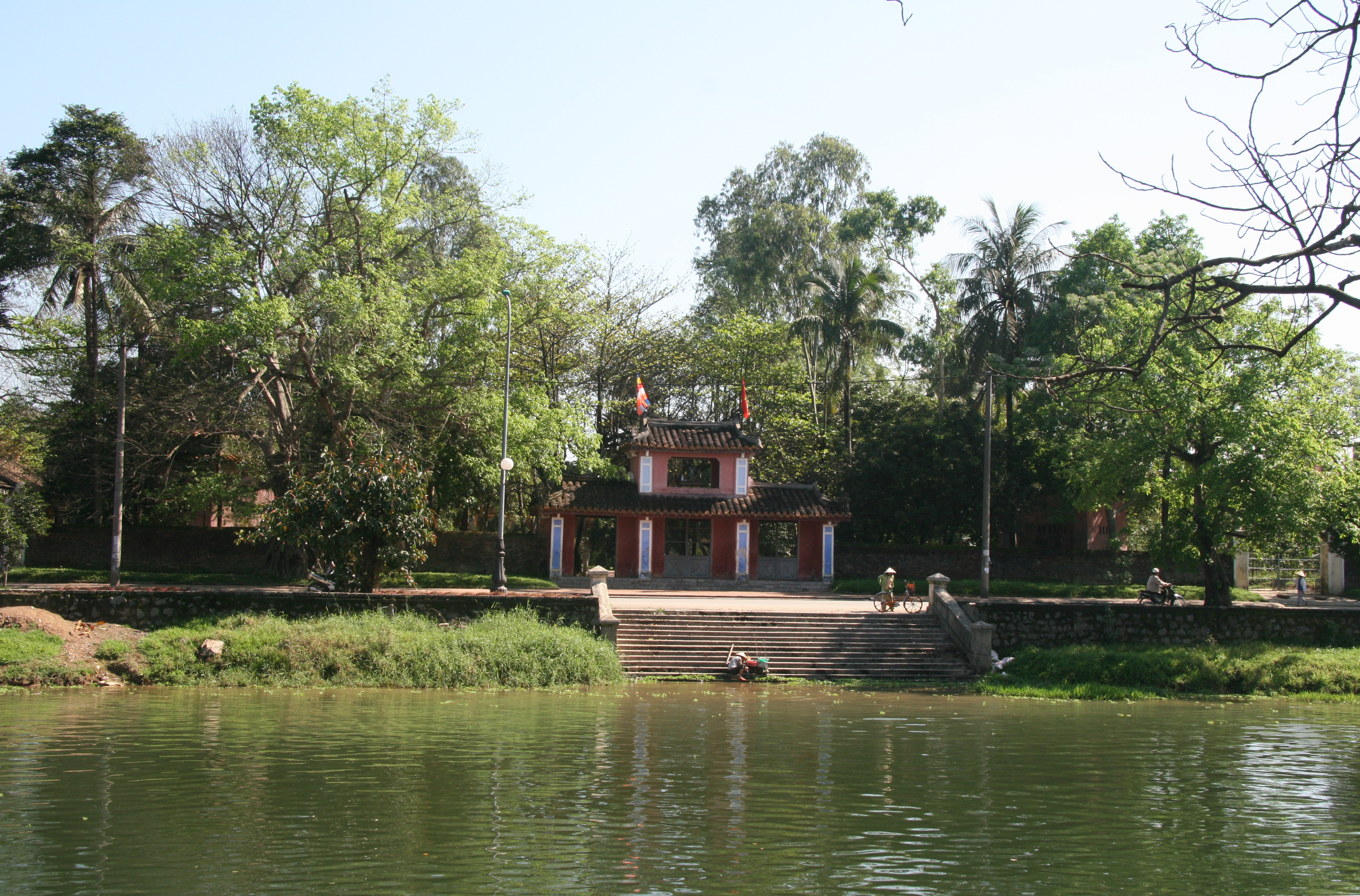
Diệu Đế Pagoda

The violence was worse in Huế, where the approach of government forces was met by the beating of Buddhist drums and cymbals to alert the populace. The townsfolk left their homes in the middle of the night in an attempt to defend the city's pagodas. At Từ Đàm, the temple of Buddhist protest leader Thích Trí Quang, monks attempted to burn the coffin of a monk who had self-immolated recently. Government soldiers, firing M1 rifles, overran the pagoda and confiscated the coffin. They demolished a statue of Gautama Buddha and looted and vandalized the pagoda. They then set off an explosion, leveling much of the pagoda. Many Buddhists were shot, beheaded, and clubbed to death. The most determined resistance to the Diệm regime occurred outside the Diệu Đế Pagoda. As troops attempted to stretch a barbed wire barricade across a bridge leading to the pagoda, the crowd tore it down with their bare hands. The protesters fought the heavily armed military personnel with rocks, sticks and their bare fists, throwing back the tear gas grenades fired at them. After a five-hour battle, the military finally won control of the bridge by driving armored cars through the angry crowd at sunrise. The defense of the bridge and Diệu Đế left an estimated 30 dead and 200 wounded.

Ten truckloads of bridge defenders were taken to jail and an estimated 500 people were arrested in the city. Seventeen of the 47 professors at Huế University, who had resigned earlier in the week in protest against the dismissal of the rector Cao Văn Luân, a Catholic priest and opponent of Archbishop Thục (the elder brother of Diệm and Nhu), were also arrested. The raids were repeated in cities and towns across the country. The total number of dead and disappeared was never confirmed, but estimates range up to several hundred. At least 1,400 were arrested.

== U.S. reaction and sanctuary for monks ==
The United States became immediately embroiled in the attacks following the escape of two monks over the back wall of the Xá Lợi pagoda into the adjacent USAID compound. Saigon's police chief, disguised as a member of Nhu's Republican Youth, cordoned off the building. He ordered all Vietnamese inside to leave the area and threatened to storm the building when the Americans denied him entry. Foreign Minister Vũ Văn Mẫu rushed to the scene to stop any physical confrontations but demanded the Americans turn over the monks. William Trueheart, the deputy of the recently relieved U.S. Ambassador Nolting, arrived at the building. As the leading American diplomat in Vietnam in the transition period between ambassadors, Trueheart refused to take action until he received instructions from Washington, but warned Mẫu against violating the diplomatic immunity of the USAID offices. Trueheart knew handing over the monks would imply American approval of the regime's action. The confrontation soon died down, and the U.S. State Department ordered Trueheart not to release the two monks and to regard the USAID building as being equivalent to the embassy. More monks went on to find sanctuary in the U.S. embassy, which became known as the "Buddhist Hilton".

Lodge was in Honolulu for last minute briefings with Nolting when news came through of the pagoda raids. He was given directions to proceed directly to Saigon, and arrived after sunset on 22 August. In the meantime, the US State Department denounced the raids as a "direct violation by the Vietnamese government of assurances that it was pursuing a policy of reconciliation with the Buddhists". On 23 August, Lodge's first full day in Saigon, he visited the two monks who had taken refuge in the USAID building, and ordered vegetarian food be made available for them. The meeting was a means of showing the American government opposed attacks against the Buddhists.

== Diệm reaction ==
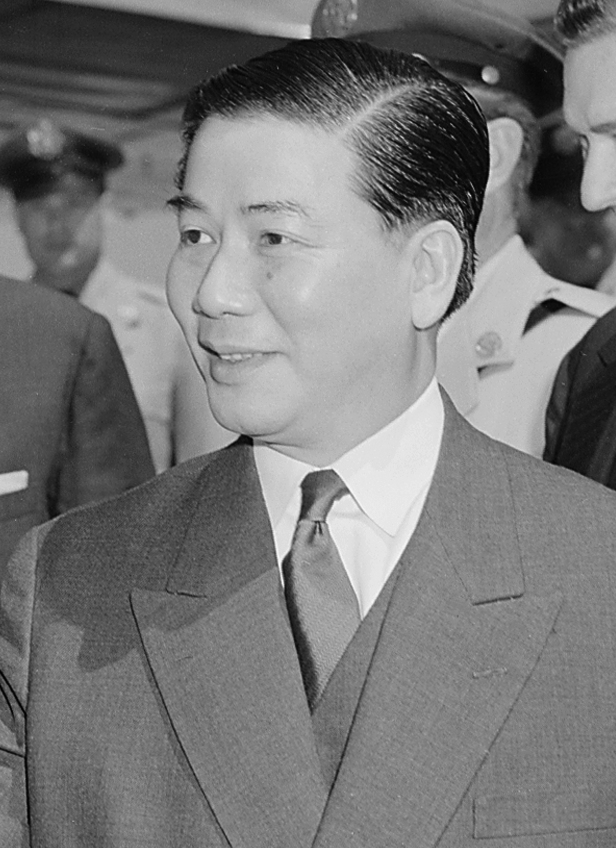
Ngô Đình Diệm (1901–1963) in 1957

At 06:00 on 21 August 1963, President Diệm broadcast a statement on Radio Saigon where he said: "under Article 44 of the constitution, I declare a state of siege throughout the national territory. I confer upon the Army of the Republic of Vietnam the responsibility to restore security and public order so that the state may be protected, Communism defeated, freedom secured, and democracy achieved". Under martial law, the army was given blanket search-and-arrest powers and empowered to ban all public gatherings, enforce a curfew, restrict press freedom and stop the circulation of all "printed material and other documents harmful to public order and security". The military were given orders to shoot anybody who violated the curfew on sight, and the secret police used the increased powers to raid and vandalize the premises of anyone thought to be unfriendly to the regime. Government sources claimed soldiers had found machine guns, ammunition, plastic explosives, homemade mines, daggers, and Việt Cộng documents in Xá Lợi, Ấn Quang, and various Theravada pagodas. It was later discovered they had been planted there by Nhu's men. On 29 August, General Đính held a press conference where he accused the Americans of trying to launch a coup in South Vietnam and took credit for the raids, despite Tung having been the chief military officer in charge.

== Confusion over culpability and army denials ==
The driving force behind the government assault on the Buddhists appeared to have come from senior military commanders acting without consulting the civilian government. Immediately after the attacks, posters were erected across Saigon under the aegis of ARVN, but the language was recognized as that of Nhu. The Secretary of State Nguyễn Đình Thuận and Interior Minister Bùi Văn Lương were surprised by the attacks. The initial perception was the military establishment had suddenly cracked down on the Buddhists because they were deemed to be a threat to the war effort. The government propagated a theory which held the military felt compelled to take action after pro-Buddhist student unrest on 17–18 August. In Huế, student protestors had turned on an ARVN officer after he fired in their direction. The attacks were preceded by a large rally at Xá Lợi during which some monks had called for the overthrow of the Diệm regime and denounced the anti-Buddhist statements of the de facto first lady Madame Nhu. However, observers dismissed government claims of the raids being spontaneous.

Diệm had long distrusted his generals and frequently played them against each other in a divide and conquer strategy to weaken any chance of a coup attempt. The army also contained substantial numbers of soldiers of Buddhist backgrounds, thus increasing doubts they would have attacked the pagodas and monks in such a violent manner. The synchronized military operations throughout the country, the speed at which banners were erected declaring the ARVN resolve to defeat communism, and doctored propaganda photos purporting to show Việt Cộng infiltration of the Buddhists suggested the actions were long premeditated. In an attempt to maintain secrecy, special printing presses had produced propaganda materials only hours before the raids.

The initial government line was the regular army had taken the actions. ARVN radio broadcasts bore the influence of Nhu's abrasive tone in directing the Republican Youth to cooperate with the government. Nhu accused the Buddhists of turning their pagodas into headquarters for plotting anti-government insurrections. He claimed the Buddhist Intersect Committee operated under the control of "political speculators who exploited religion and terrorism". Lodge believed Diệm remained in control but Nhu's influence had risen to unprecedented levels. He thought Nhu's divide and conquer tactics had split the military into three factions, respectively led by Generals Đôn and Đính, and Colonel Tung. Đôn was believed not to have the allegiance of Đính and Tung, who took their orders directly from Gia Long Palace. The two loyalists had support from various pro-Diệm elements. Lodge predicted fighting could break out within the ARVN if the army deposed Diệm.

Initially, the American embassy believed the Ngô family's claims of the regular army being responsible for the raids. Voice of America, which was widely listened to in South Vietnam as the only non-Diệmist news source, initially aired Nhu's version of events, much to the dismay of the generals. The American media thought otherwise and began to debunk this theory, noting the Ngô family constantly sought to undermine the army and Madame Nhu's joy over the events suggested the family had neither ceded power nor were their hands forced by the military. Furthermore, they identified Nhu's aides at the site, his idiosyncratic style in the announcements supposedly made by the ARVN, and the fact that the army had little motive to attack the Buddhists. The New York Times printed two versions of the raids on its front page, one by David Halberstam implicating Nhu for the attacks, and another with the official government version. Sheehan of United Press International also claimed Nhu was responsible for the attacks. At the time, Sheehan and Halberstam were on a Ngô family hit list along with political dissidents because of their exposés of the regime's human rights abuses, and following the raids, they slept at the home of John Mecklin, a U.S. official. They also received information the Ngos were going to plant bombs in their offices and blame the deaths on the communists.

The Central Intelligence Agency (CIA) went on to report ARVN officers had resolutely denied any involvement in the pagoda raids. They held Tung's Special Forces had disguised themselves in ARVN uniforms before attacking the pagodas. Further unsubstantiated rumors had spread within the army of the Americans, who trained the Special Forces, had helped plan the attack. The ARVN leaders were unsure of how to proceed and Don called a staff meeting on the morning of 23 August to discuss impending demonstrations against the raids by university students and the anger of junior ARVN officers about the pagoda attacks. General Dương Văn Minh noted the ongoing presence of armed military personnel had alienated society by creating an "aura of suppression".

Later in the day, Đôn privately met with CIA officer Lucien Conein and reiterated the Americans were mistaken in believing the ARVN was responsible. Đôn insisted Diem remained in control although Nhu had to approve all of the generals' meetings with Diệm. Đôn insisted Nhu had orchestrated the raids, fearing the generals had too much power. He asserted Nhu had used the cover of martial law to discredit the generals by dressing the Special Forces in ARVN uniforms. Đôn insisted he was unaware of the plans and was at Joint General Staff headquarters with Khiêm when he received a radio message informing him of the assaults. Police Commissioner Trần Văn Tu, supported by Tung's men, was in charge of the operation at the ground level, and by the time Don arrived, the mission had been completed. Khiêm had his own meeting with Rufus Phillips at the U.S. Embassy. He bitterly confided Nhu had tricked the army into imposing martial law and becoming his "puppet". Khiêm asserted Đính, Đôn and the other generals were not aware of the raids in advance and revealed the arms and explosives Nhu claimed were found in the pagodas had been planted. As a result, the Vietnamese people expressed anger at the army and their U.S. backers, strengthening Nhu's position.

== Martial law and riots ==
Following the raids, tensions were high on city streets. Police were ordered to shoot those who defied the 21:00 to 05:00 curfew, and troops in full camouflage battle dress guarded every major intersection and bridge with automatic weapons bearing fixed bayonets. The empty pagodas were ringed by troops and armored cars. All outgoing news was censored, forcing reporters to smuggle their copies out with travelers flying to foreign countries. The telephone lines in the homes and offices of all U.S. military and embassy staff were disconnected. The head of the USAID mission Joe Brant was stopped and searched while commuting to work, and other American officials had their meetings with Vietnamese officials and applications for permits to travel after the curfew hours delayed. The 14,000 U.S. military advisers in the country were given orders to stay in their homes, and all leaves were canceled.

The pagoda raids provoked widespread disquiet among the Saigonese. At midnight on 22 August, Generals Đôn, Đính and Khiêm informed Nhu student demonstrations were planned for three consecutive days. They recommended schools be closed, but when Nhu took them to see Diệm, the president refused to close the educational institutions. Diệm decided the students, not usually known for political activism, should be allowed to voice their opinions. Students at Saigon University boycotted classes and rioted, which was met with arrests, imprisonment, and the closure of the campus. These events were repeated at Huế University, which was likewise shut down.

When high school students demonstrated, Diệm had them arrested as well. Two of the detained students were paraded at a press conference where they falsely admitted to being communists who had brainwashed their entire school, having been tortured to force their confession. At Trung Vuong, an elite girls' high school, the students hung up banners attacking Diệm and the Nhus, while students from the corresponding boys' schools became violent, smashing school windows and erecting banners that insulted Madame Nhu in explicit language. More than 1000 students from Saigon's leading high school, most of them children of public servants and military officers, were sent to re-education camps. This resulted in many army officers and senior civil servants having to lobby to have their children or younger siblings released from jail, causing a further drop in morale among government and military officials. Brawls broke out between police officers arresting students and the students' parents, many of whom were military officers and/or public servants.

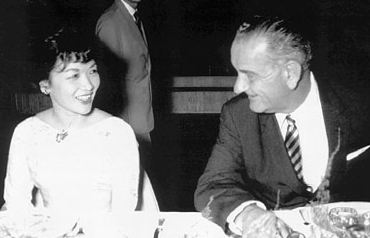
The parents of First Lady Madame Nhu (pictured left, with Lyndon Johnson) resigned their diplomatic posts and disowned her after the pagoda raids

Foreign Minister Vũ Văn Mẫu resigned, shaving his head like a Buddhist monk in protest. Mẫu had decided to leave the country for a religious pilgrimage to India, but the Ngô family had him arrested before he could depart. General Đính softened the punishment at the behest of a fellow officer and put the former diplomat under house arrest instead of placing him in jail. Trần Văn Chương, the ambassador to the United States and father of Madame Nhu, resigned in protest, along with all but one of the staff members at the embassy. Chương charged Diệm with having "copied the tactics of totalitarian regimes", and said as long as Diệm and the Nhus were in power, there was "not once chance in a hundred for victory" against the communists. Madame Chương, who was South Vietnam's observer at the United Nations, resigned and spoke of mass executions and a reign of terror under Diệm and Nhu. She predicted if Diệm and the Nhus did not leave Vietnam then they would be killed in some sort of uprising.

Voice of America announced Chương had resigned in protest against the Ngô family's policies, but this was denied by the Saigon government, which asserted the Chương had been sacked. Diệm bureaucrats claimed Chương's last telegram had been so critical of the regime it was determined to be "inadmissible in form and substance", and Diệm had dismissed his ambassador after years of privately complaining about him. In the meantime, the brothers made selective payments to some generals, hoping to cause resentment and division within the army. Vietnamese civil servants also became more reluctant to do their jobs, especially in conjunction with American advisers. They reasoned the Americans must have been involved in the attacks as they were funding Tung's men.

== Change in U.S. policy ==
Once the U.S. government realized the truth about who was behind the raids, they reacted with disapproval towards the Diệm regime. The Americans had pursued a policy of quietly and privately advising the Ngôs to reconcile with the Buddhists while publicly supporting the partnership, but following the attacks, this route was regarded as untenable. Furthermore, the attacks were carried out by American-trained Special Forces personnel funded by the CIA, and presented Lodge with a fait accompli. One Western ambassador thought the raids signaled "the end of the gallant American effort here". The U.S. State Department issued a statement declaring the raids were a "direct violation" of the promise to pursue "a policy of reconciliation".

On 24 August, the Kennedy administration sent Cable 243 to Lodge at the embassy in Saigon, marking a change in American policy. The message advised Lodge to seek the removal of the Nhus from power, and to look for alternative leadership options if Diệm refused to heed American pressure for reform. As the probability of Diệm sidelining the Nhus was seen as virtually nil, the message effectively meant the fomenting of a coup. Voice of America broadcast a statement blaming Nhu for the raids and absolving the army of responsibility. Aware the Americans would neither oppose a coup nor respond with aid cuts or sanctions, the generals deposed the Ngô brothers, who were arrested and assassinated the next day, 2 November 1963.
