= Tangeman =

Tangeman may refer to:

- Tangemann, a surname
- Tangeman, Iran, a village in Iran
