= Diệu Đế Temple =

Buddhist temple in Vietnam

Coordinates: 16.4779°N 107.5875°E

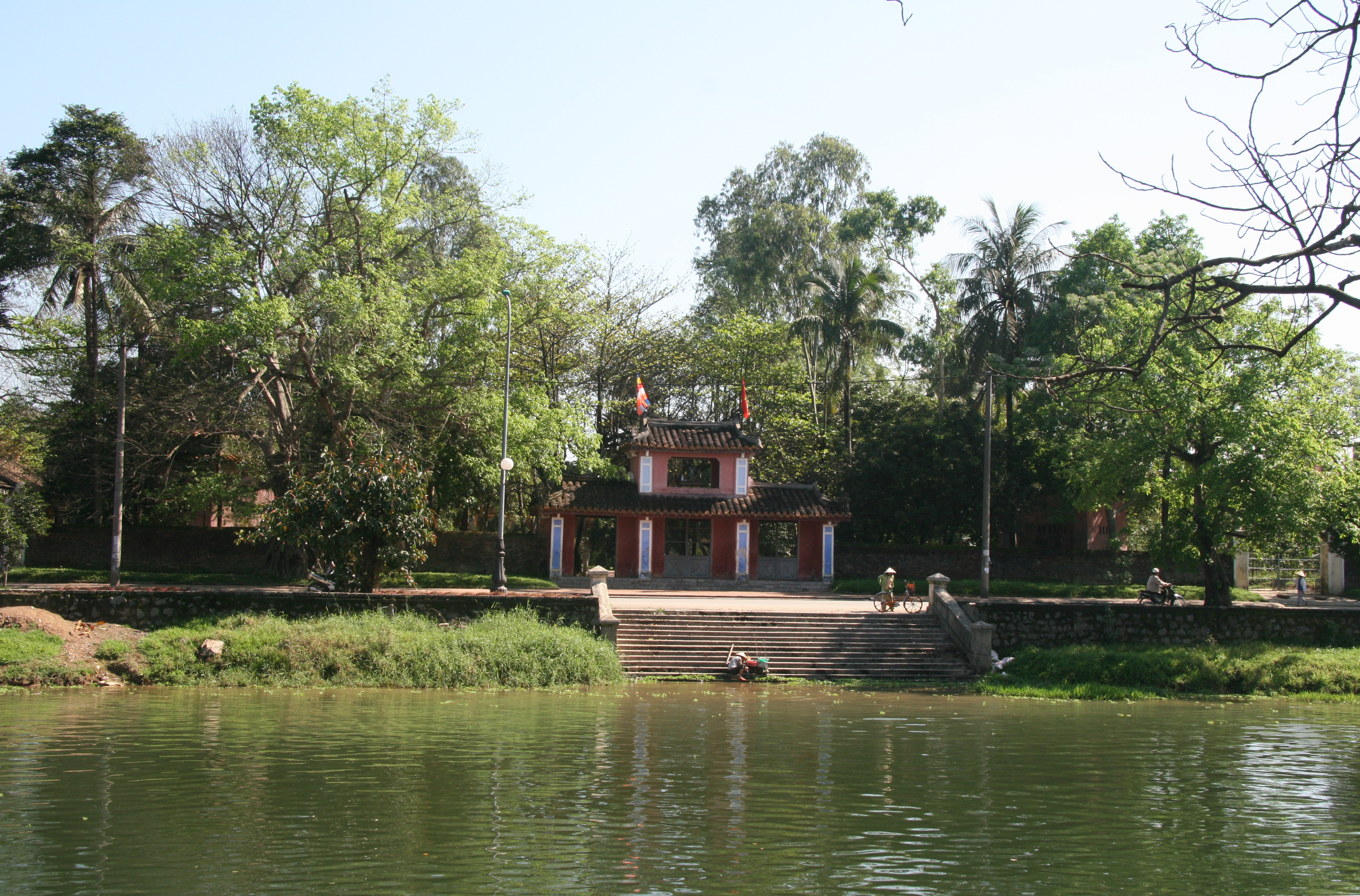
Tam quan gate at Diệu Đế Temple on the bank of Dong Ba Canal

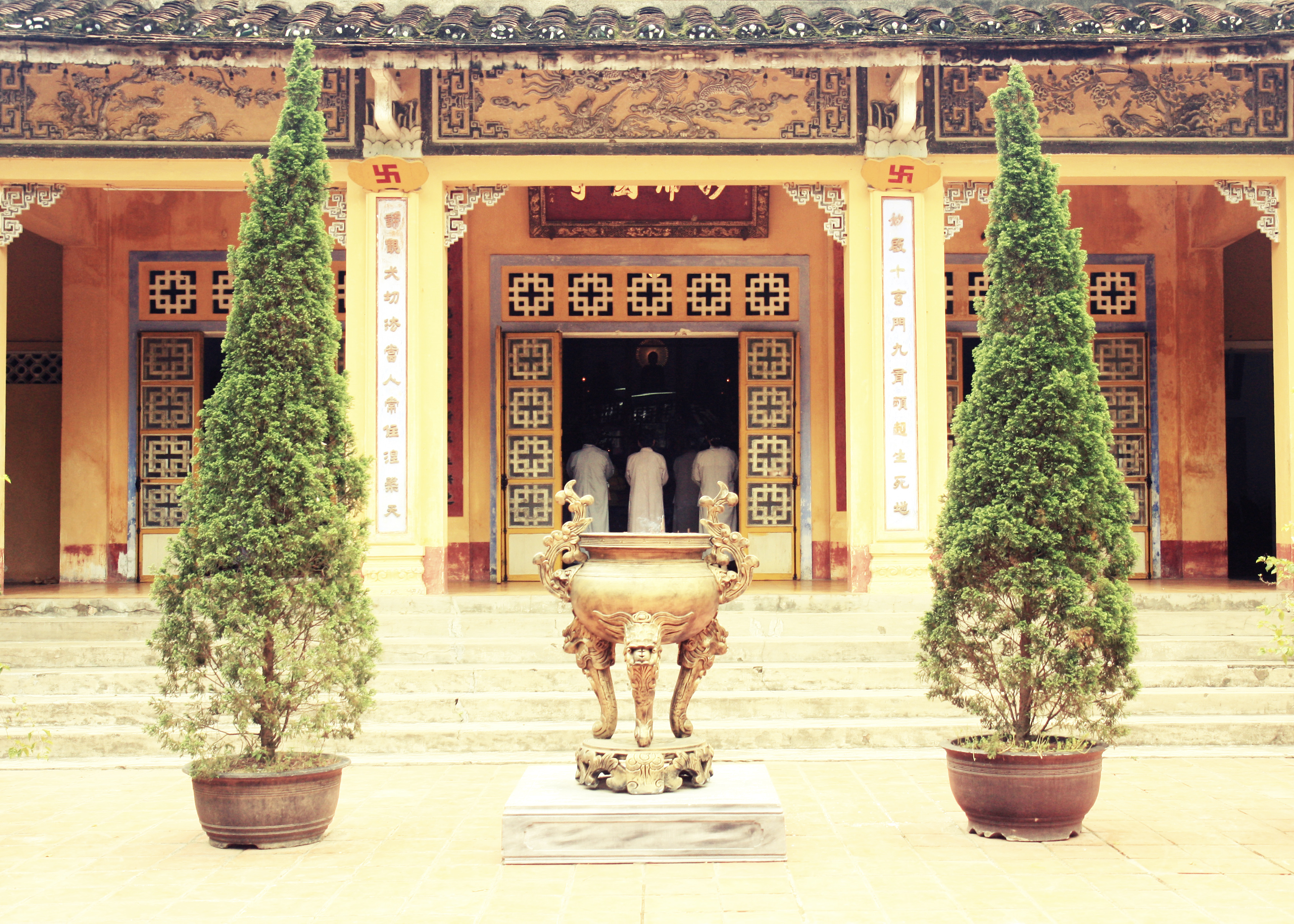
A hall of Diệu Đế Temple

Diệu Đế Temple (Vietnamese: Chùa Diệu Đế) is a Buddhist temple in the central city of Huế in Vietnam. It is named for the Four Noble Truths of Buddhism, which are called Tứ Diệu Đế in Vietnamese. During the 19th century Nguyễn dynasty, Emperor Thiệu Trị declared it to be one of the national pagodas of Vietnam. Outside of Vietnam, the temple is best known as a site of activism during the 1960s, as well as against the Vietnam War. On the night of 21 August 1963, it was the site of a bloody battle between the government forces of President Ngô Đình Diệm and rioting pro-Buddhist civilians who were attempting to stop the troops from raiding the pagoda to arrest dissident monks who were calling for religious equality during the Buddhist crisis.

== Architecture ==
The pagoda entrance is on the banks of the Dong Ba canal. The temple gates face southwest; directly on the other side of the canal is the Dong Ba gate of the eastern side of the Citadel of Huế, which was the imperial headquarters of the Nguyễn dynasty, erected by Emperor Gia Long at the start of the 19th century. Diệu Đế pagoda was one of the three pagodas in Huế to be declared as a "national pagoda" by Emperor Thiệu Trị and was under the direct patronage of the Nguyễn dynasty. The pagoda was built under the reign of Thiệu Trị and is famous for its four low towers, one to either side of the main gate, while the other two flank the sanctuary. Two towers contain bells, while the other two contain a bell and stele, respectively. The main ceremonial hall contains a statue of Gautama Buddha, flanked by Bodhisattvas Bồ Tát Phổ Hiền and Bồ Tát Văn Thù Sư Lợi.

== Buddhist crisis and temple raids ==
South Vietnam's Buddhist majority had long been discontented with the oppressive rule of President Diệm since his rise to power in 1955. Diệm showed favouritism towards Catholics and discrimination against Buddhists in the army, public service and distribution of government aid. In the countryside, Catholics were de facto exempt from performing corvée labour and in some rural areas, Catholic priests led private armies against Buddhist villages. Discontent with Diệm exploded into mass protest in Huế during the summer of 1963 when nine Buddhists died at the hand of Diệm's army and police on Vesak, the birthday of Gautama Buddha. In May 1963, a law against the flying of religious flags was selectively invoked; the Buddhist flag was banned from display on Vesak while the Vatican flag was displayed to celebrate the anniversary of the consecration of Archbishop Pierre Martin Ngô Đình Thục, Diệm's elder brother. The Buddhists defied the ban and a protest that began with a march starting from Từ Đàm to the government broadcasting station was ended when government forces opened fire. As a result, Buddhist protests were held across the country and steadily grew in size, asking for the signing of a Joint Communique to end religious inequality. Từ Đàm Pagoda was a major organising point for the Buddhist movement and was often the location of hunger strikes, barricades and protests.

As the tension increased and opposition to Diệm intensified, the turning point came shortly after midnight on 21 August, when Ngô Đình Nhu's Special Forces raided and vandalised Buddhist pagodas across the country, rounding up thousands of monks and leaving hundreds dead. The most determined resistance to the Diệm regime occurred outside the Diệu Đế Pagoda. As troops attempted to stretch a barbed wire barricade across the bridge leading to the pagoda, a large crowd of pro-Buddhist laypeople and anti-government protesters tore it down with their bare hands. The crowd then fought the heavily armed military personnel with rocks, sticks and their bare fists, throwing back the tear gas grenades that were aimed at them. After a five-hour battle, the military finally won control of the bridge at dawn by driving armored cars through the angry crowd. The defense of the bridge and Diệu Đế left an estimated 30 dead and 200 wounded. Ten truckloads of bridge defenders were taken to jail and an estimated 500 people were arrested in the city. The total number of dead and disappeared was never confirmed, but estimates range up to several hundred.

After the deposal and assassination of Diệm, the temple later became the center of anti-American and anti-war protests by Buddhists and students against the Vietnam War. During a period of chaos and protest in 1966, the temple was stormed by police and the army under General Tôn Thất Đính, who had been sent in by Prime Minister Nguyễn Cao Kỳ to quell the anti-government protests. Many monks were arrested, along with their supporters and student protesters.

== Sources ==
- Jacobs, Seth (2006). Cold War Mandarin: Ngo Dinh Diem and the Origins of America's War in Vietnam, 1950–1963. Rowman & Littlefield. ISBN 0-7425-4447-8.
- Jones, Howard (2003). Death of a Generation. Oxford University Press. ISBN 0-19-505286-2.
