= Mother tongue (disambiguation) =

Mother tongue usually refers to the language that a person learned as a child at home or a person's first language

Mother tongue may also refer to:

- Mother tongue, or language, a proto-language in historical linguistics
- Proto-Human language, the hypothetical most recent common ancestor of all the world's languages
- The Mother Tongue, a history of the English language by Bill Bryson
- Mother Tongue (journal), a periodical published by the Association for the Study of Languages in Prehistory
- Mothertongue (2025 film), a Chinese drama film
- Mother Tongue Publishing, a Canadian publisher

== Music ==
- Mothertongue (album), 2008 album by Nico Muhly
- Mother Tongue, an American rock band co-founded by guitarist Jesse Tobias
- "Mother Tongue" (Bring Me the Horizon song), a song by Bring Me the Horizon from Amo
- "Mother Tongue", a song by Dead Can Dance from The Serpent's Egg

== See also ==
- Mother-in-law's tongue, Dracaena trifasciata, a species of flowering plant
- Father Tongue hypothesis
- Native Tongue (disambiguation)
