= Xá Lợi Pagoda =

Buddhist temple in Vietnam

- Chùa Xá Lợi
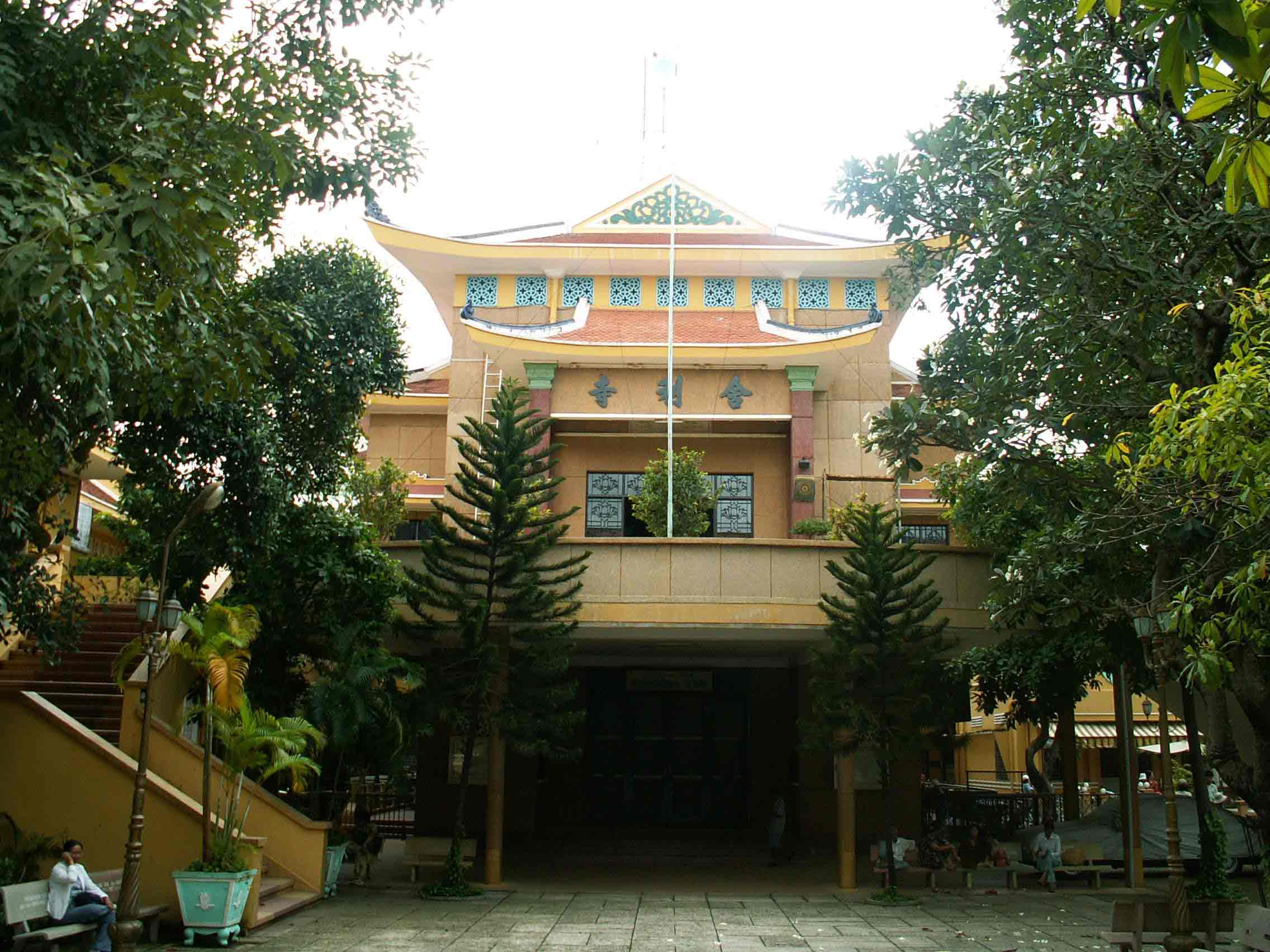

- Location in Vietnam

Religion
- Affiliation: Buddhist
- District: District 3
- Province: Ho Chi Minh City
- Deity: Buddha

Location
- Location: Ho Chi Minh City
- Country: Vietnam
- Coordinates: 10°46′41″N 106°41′12″E

Architecture
- Completed: 1956

The Xá Lợi Pagoda (Vietnamese: Chùa Xá Lợi [saː˦˥ ləːj˨˩˨] SAW-LIE; chữ Hán: 舍利寺) is the largest pagoda in Ho Chi Minh City, Vietnam. It was built in 1956 and was the headquarters of Buddhism in South Vietnam. The pagoda is located in District 3, Ho Chi Minh City and lies on a plot of 5000 square metres. The name Xá Lợi is the Vietnamese translation for śarīra, a term used for relics of Buddhists.

The pagoda was best known for the raids, in which the Army of the Republic of Vietnam Special Forces loyal to Ngô Đình Nhu, the brother of the Roman Catholic President Ngô Đình Diệm, raided and vandalised Buddhist monasteries and pagodas on 21 August 1963.

== History ==
=== Construction ===
Construction began on 5 August 1956, according to the plans drawn up by the architects Trần Văn Đường and Đỗ Bá Vinh, while the directing engineers were Dư Ngọc Ánh and Hồ Tố Thuận. The pagoda was opened on 2 May 1958, by the Most Venerable Thich Khanh Anh. The pagoda was built to enshrine a sample of the relics of Gautama Buddha, giving its name.

=== Protests and raids in 1963 ===
A series of raids in response to Vietnamese Buddhists' protests for civil rights in the face of religious persecution from the government of the Roman Catholic President Ngô Đình Diệm. Squads of Special Forces, led by Lê Quang Tung and combat police flattened the gates and smashed their way into the pagoda at around 00:20 on 21 August 1963, as Xá Lợi's brass gong was clanged as a warning signal of the attack. Nhu's men were armed with pistols, submachine guns, carbines, shotguns, grenades and tear gas. The Special Forces were joined by truckloads of combat police in army camouflage uniforms. Monks and nuns who barricaded themselves behind wooden shields were attacked with rifle butts and bayonets. The gong of the pagoda was drowned out by the burst of automatic weapons fire, the sound of exploding grenades, shattering glass and human screaming. One monk was thrown from the balcony down to the courtyard six meters below. Nhu's men vandalized the main altar and managed to confiscate the intact charred heart of Thích Quảng Đức, the monk who had self-immolated in protest against the policies of the regime. Two monks jumped the back wall of the pagoda into the grounds of the adjoining US Aid Mission, where they were granted asylum.

Thich Tinh Khiet, the 80-year-old Buddhist patriarch of Vietnam, was seized and taken to a military hospital on the outskirts of Saigon. The commander of the III Corps of the ARVN, General Tôn Thất Đính, soon announced military control over Saigon, canceling all commercial flights into the city and instituting press censorship. Across the country, hundreds were estimated to have died or vanished, and more than one thousand monks were incarcerated.

=== Administrative function ===
The pagoda served as the headquarters of the Vietnamese Buddhist Association until 1981, and as its second office until May 1993.

== Site ==
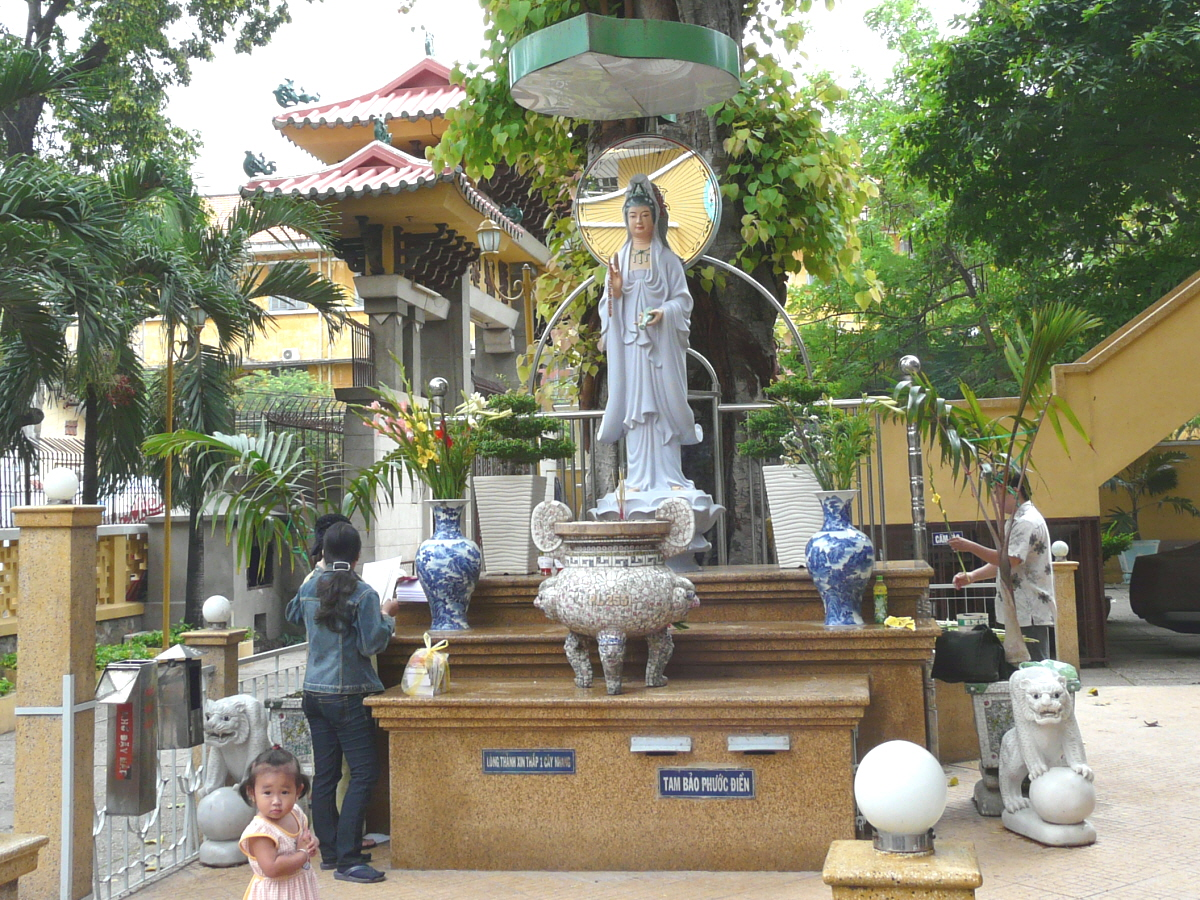
The statue of Quan Âm inside the fenced yard of the Xá Lợi pagoda

The site includes a number of buildings, including the main ceremonial hall and the bell tower. The pagoda is separated from the street by a gated fence. Inside the fence is a popular Chinese-style statue of Quan Âm holding a vial of elixir in one hand and making the gesture of removing obstacles with the other. The main hall of the pagoda is located on the upper level. Men ascend by the stairs on the left hand side, women by those on the right. The hall is rectangular in shape, and is supported by pillars. Facing the entrance is the shrine, which is dominated by a large statue of Gautama Buddha.

=== Shrine ===
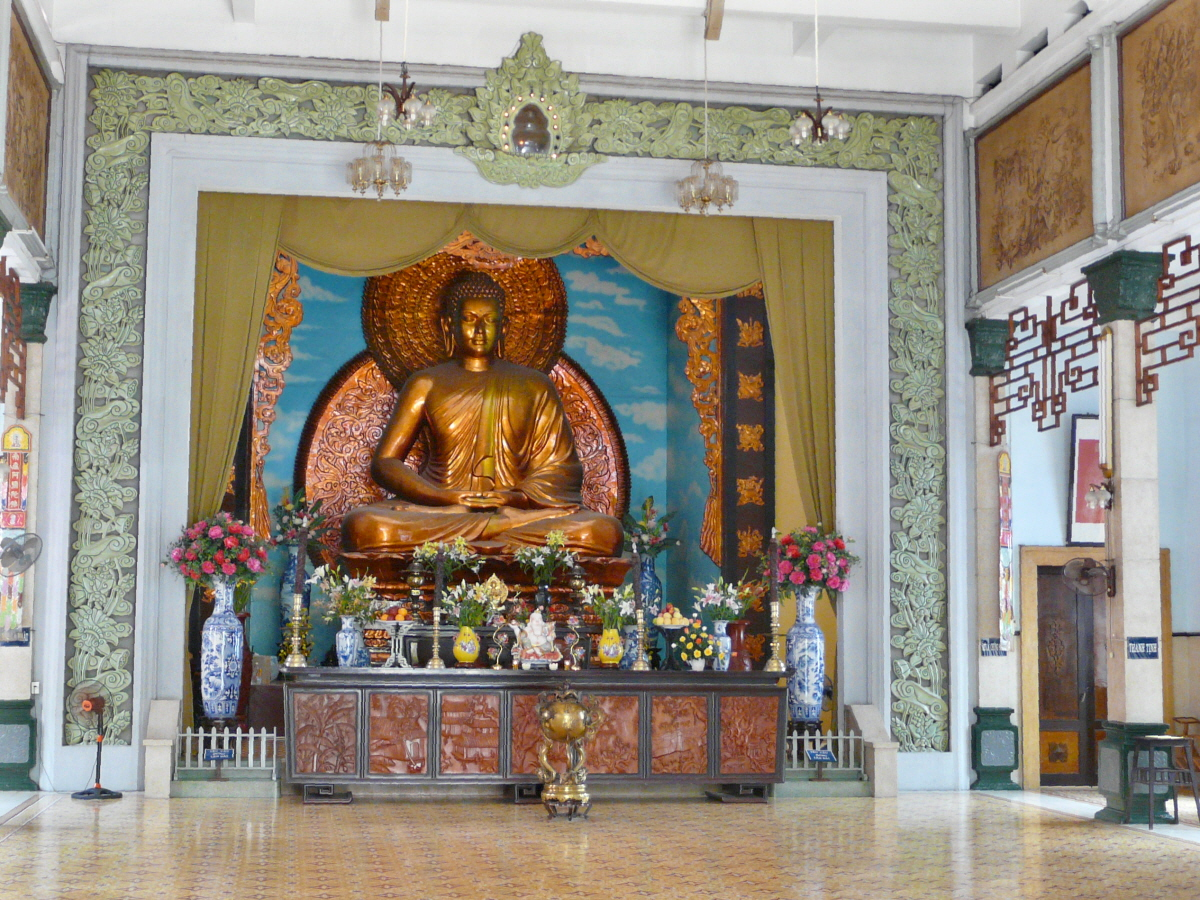
The gilded statue of Gautama Buddha dominates the shrine.

The statue of Gautama depicts the Buddha seated in meditation on a lotus blossom. He is wearing the garb of a monk. As usual, he is depicted with ears lengthened by the use of jewelry (indicating his royal origins), closely cropped curly hair (indicating renunciation of the worldly life), and a large protuberance on his head (indicating aptitude). Behind his head is a sun disc. This statue was crafted by sculptors from Biên Hòa, a city just north of Ho Chi Minh City. It has been in its current state since 1969, when a gold coating was applied to it. In front of the statue of Gautama Buddha is the shrine dedicated to the relics of the Buddha, with the relics being held in a small stupa. Towards the front of the shrine is a small porcelain image of the "Laughing Buddha" Maitreya, the Buddha of the future. Between the small statue of Maitreya and the large statue of Gautama is a golden image of multi-armed Cundi (Chuan De) bodhisattva sitting in meditation on a lotus blossom. The bodhisattva's many hands grasp familiar attributes such as the sword, the wheel, and the trident. Elegant Chinese-style vases on either side of the shrine hold flowers of various colors.

=== Scenes from the life of Gautama Buddha ===
The walls of the main hall play host to a sequence of large panels depicting fourteen scenes from the life of the Gautama Buddha, from his birth as Prince Siddhartha to his attainment of nirvana. The images were created by Dr. Nguyen Van Long of the Gia Dinh Art School. Arranged sequentially high on the two side walls, the images are reminiscent of the depictions of the life of Jesus or of the Stations of the Cross found in some Christian churches. The fourteen scenes are as follows:

- Queen Maya, the mother of the historical Buddha, dreams that an elephant with six tusks enters her through her right side.
- The young Siddhartha walks on open lotus flowers, pointing at the Heaven and the Earth.
- The elder Asita notes the auspicious marks on the body of the infant Siddhartha that indicate he will be a great secular or religious leader.

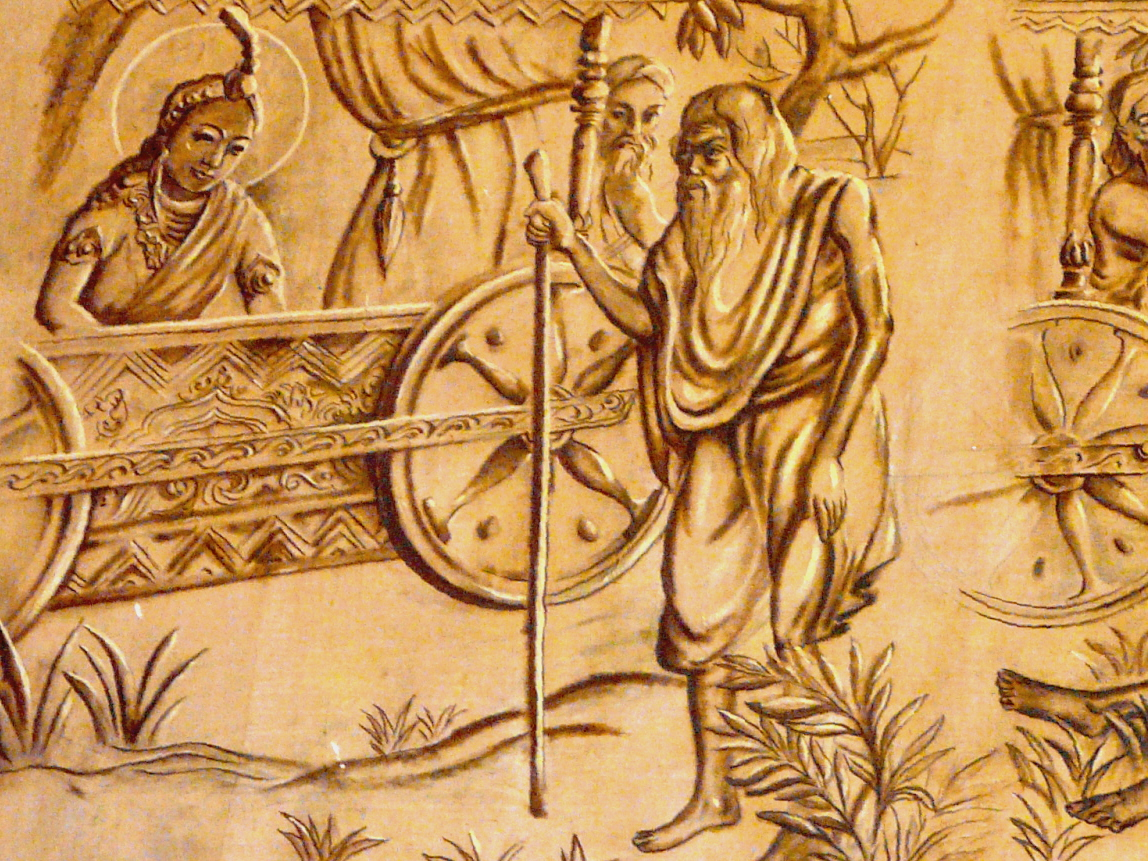
Prince Siddhartha sees an old man.

- Prince Siddhartha sees an old man and a sick man, leading him to ponder the devastation to the human body caused by old age and disease.
- The prince sees a corpse, and then a monk who is in perfect condition.
- Having decided to renounce the secular life and to lead a life of religion, the prince looks for the last time upon his family as they lie sleeping.
- Having left the royal city of Kapilavastu with his horse Kanthaka and horseman Channa, Siddhartha cuts off his long hair in order to symbolize his entry into the religious life.
- Three demon princesses representing ambition, anxiety, and voluptuousness try unsuccessfully to seduce the prince.
- Mara the king of demons and his minions attempt unsuccessfully to intimidate the prince by violence.
- Having attained Enlightenment, Gautama Buddha preaches the Four Noble Truths to his first four disciples in the garden.
- A young woman falsely accuses the Buddha of getting her pregnant, as the Buddha makes the gesture of calling upon the Earth as a witness; the Buddha instructs another young woman.
- Elephants and other animals render hommage to Buddha; Buddha converts the venomous serpents.
- The Buddha converts Angulimala, an armed assassin.
- Lying on his side, the Buddha enters into nirvana.

Above the entrance, facing the shrine itself, is an especially big image of Gautama Buddha seated in meditation underneath a fig tree.

=== Bell tower ===
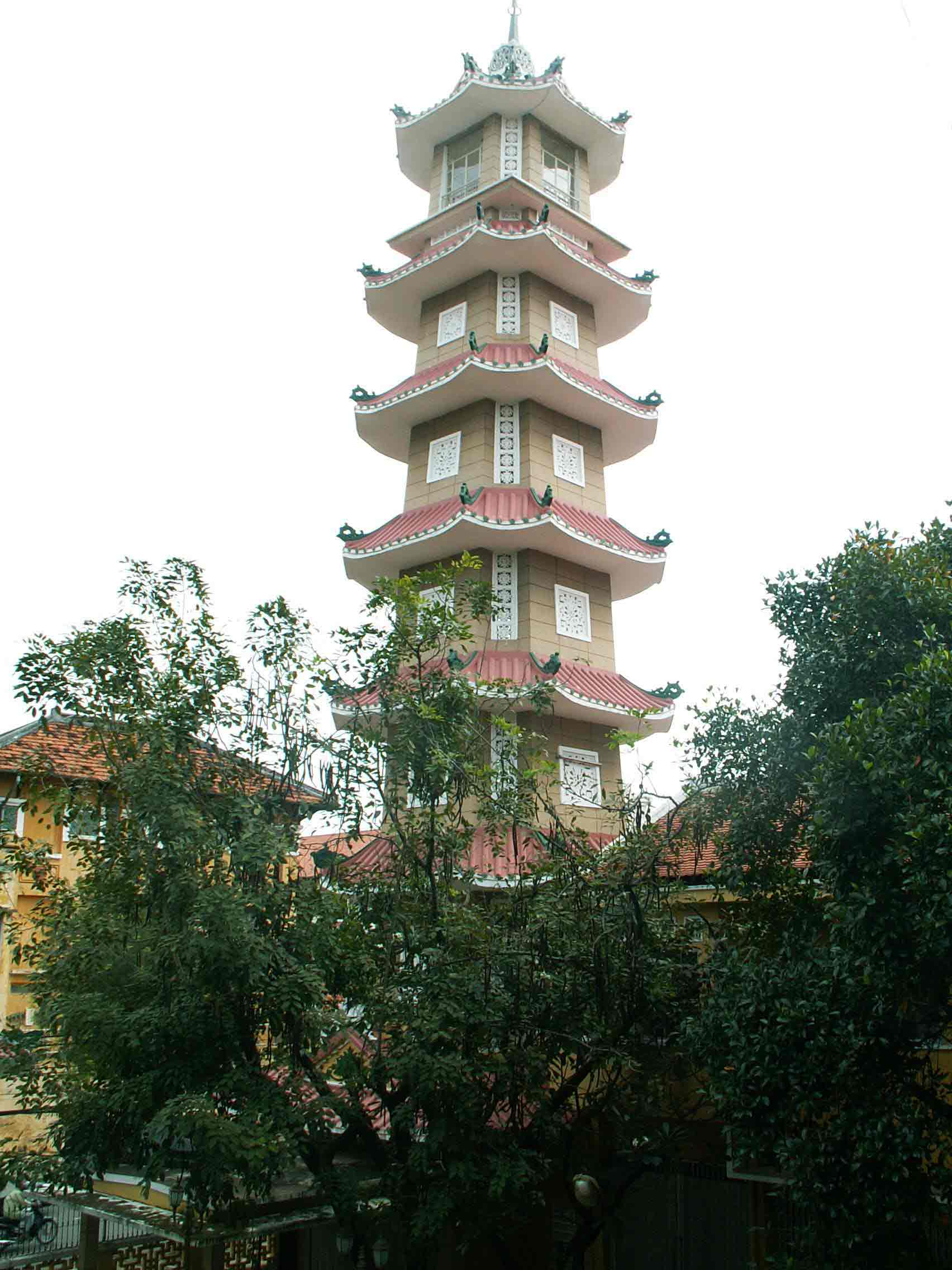
Xá Lợi Pagoda's bell tower is visible from the street

The bell tower of Xá Lợi Pagoda was opened in 1961. The tower stands 32 m, has seven stories, and is the highest bell tower in Vietnam. On the highest level, there is a bell weighing two tonnes, which was cast in the model of the bell of Thiên Mụ Pagoda in Huế.

== Sources ==
- Hammer, Ellen J. (1987). A Death in November. E. P. Dutton. ISBN 0-525-24210-4.
- Jacobs, Seth (2006). Cold War Mandarin: Ngo Dinh Diem and the Origins of America's War in Vietnam, 1950–1963. Rowman & Littlefield. ISBN 0-7425-4447-8.
- Jones, Howard (2003). Death of a Generation. Oxford University Press. ISBN 0-19-505286-2.
