= Tung =

Tung may refer to:

== People ==
- Madison Tung, a U.S. Air Force Officer, wrestler, and Rhodes Scholar
- Ho-Pin Tung, a Dutch race car driver of Chinese descent.
- Lola Tung, an actress known for her acting debut on drama series The Summer I Turned Pretty

== Places ==
- Tung Fort, a hill fort in Maharashtra, India
- Tung, a village in Bar Kham, Cambodia
- Tung (Mawal), a village in Maharashtra, India
- Tung, Sikkim, a village in India
- Tung, West Bengal, India, on the Darjeeling Himalayan Railway

== Other uses ==
- Vernicia fordii or Tung tree, a deciduous tree native to China
  - Tung oil, a furniture finish made from the seeds of the tung tree
- Tung (surname), a Cantonese Romanization of Chinese family names 董, commonly used in Hong Kong
- Tunng, an experimental folk band from the United Kingdom
- Lê Quang Tung (1923–1963), Vietnamese military leader under Ngô Đình Diệm
- Tung Tung Tung Sahur, an AI-generated internet meme related to Italian brainrot

== See also ==
- Tongue
  - Tongue (disambiguation)
