= Tange =

Tange may refer to:

People:

- Arthur Tange (1914–2001), Australian senior public servant
- Jun Watanabe Tange or Watanabe Jun (born 1954), Japanese architect, former professor at Chubu University
- Kenzo Tange (1913–2005), Japanese architect, winner of the 1987 Pritzker Prize for architecture
- Klaus Tange (born 1962), Danish actor in theatre, film, and television
- Sakura Tange (born 1973), Japanese idol, voice actress and singer
- Tange Sazen, fictional swordsman from Japanese literature and cinema

Geography:

- Tange Bolaghi or Tangeh Bolaghi, archaeologically significant valley in Iran with 130 ancient settlements
- Tange Promontory, ice-covered peninsula just west of Casey Bay on the coast of Enderby Land

Other:

- Tange International Co., manufacturer of bicycle frame tubing

== See also ==
- Dange (disambiguation)
- Tang (disambiguation)
- Tanga (disambiguation)
- Tangi (disambiguation)
- Tangle (disambiguation)
- Tango (disambiguation)
- Tonge (disambiguation)
