= Duke Gardens (New Jersey) =

Former gardens at Duke Farms near Hillsborough Township, New Jersey, United States

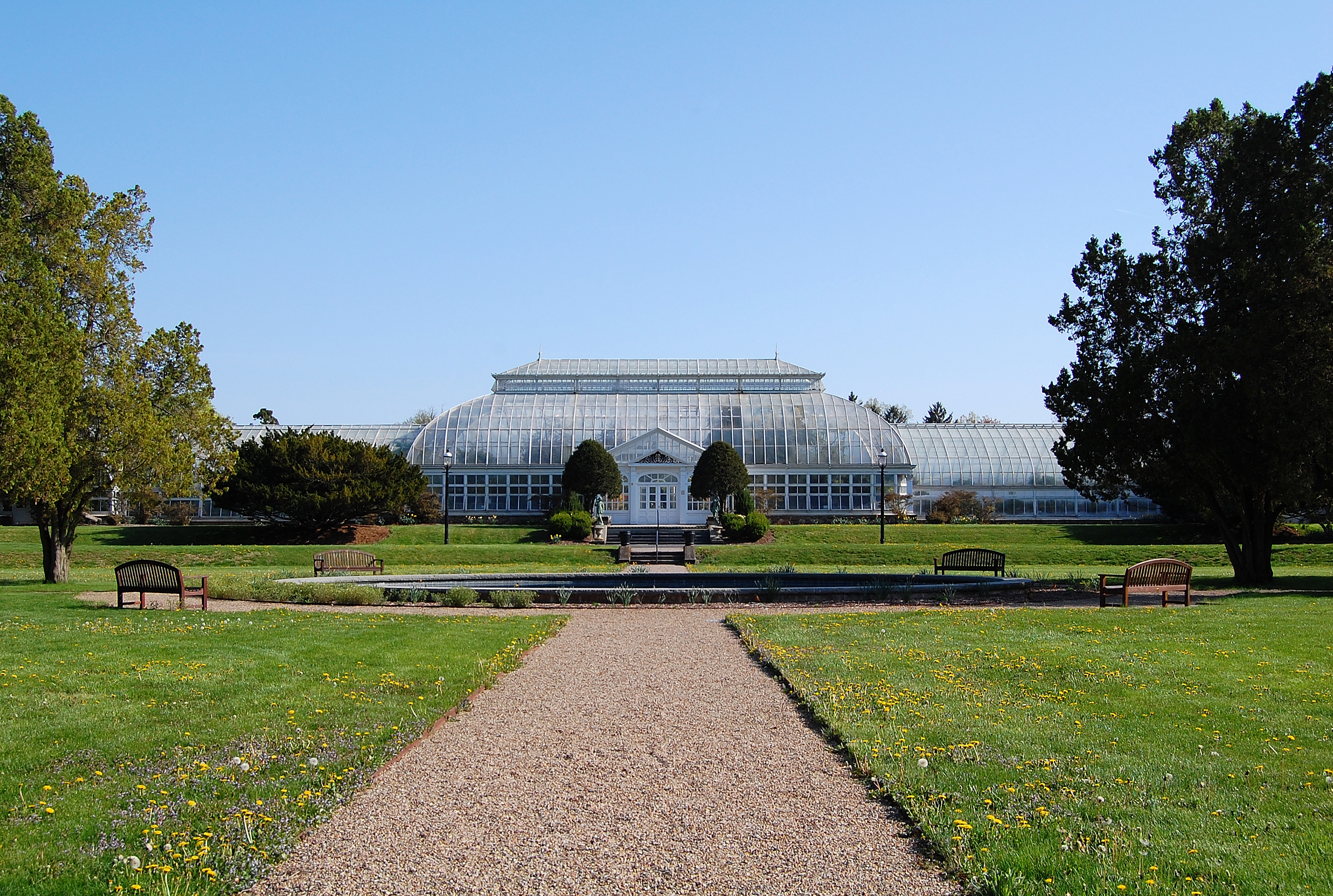
- Approach to Duke Gardens, showing Trumbauer conservatory housing Semi-tropical, Italian, and Colonial Gardens
- Interactive map of Duke Gardens
- Type: Conservatory
- Location: Duke Farms
- Nearest town: Hillsborough Township, New Jersey
- Coordinates: 40.55062°N 74.61871°W
- Area: 10 acres (4.0 ha)
- Opened: 1964
- Closed: 2008
- Founder: Doris Duke
- Manager: The Duke Gardens Foundation
- Status: Closed
- Other information: Some of the garden is now a part of Duke Farms

Duke Gardens in Somerset County, New Jersey, were among the most significant glass house collections in America. Created by Doris Duke, they were larger than the New York Botanical Garden's Enid A. Haupt Conservatory, and were open to the public from 1964. They were closed by the Doris Duke Charitable Foundation on or before May 25, 2008, and the plant material was donated to public gardens throughout the United States. After the restructuring, parts of the garden remained onsite as part of the Duke Farms, which allows access to over 1,000 acres to visitors and researchers.

== History ==
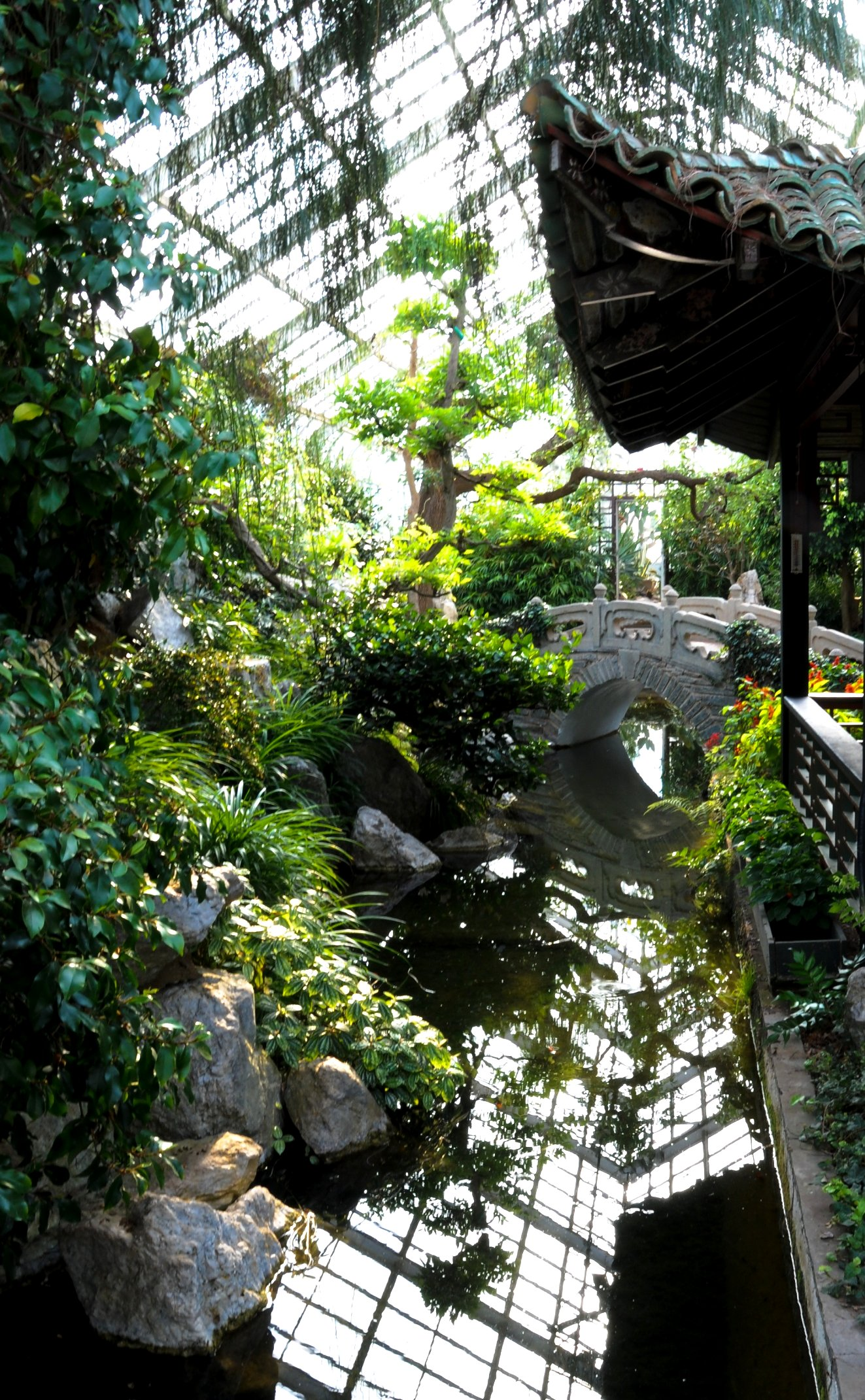
The Chinese Garden, showing serenity bridge over koi stream

Duke Gardens were part of the 2,700-acre (1,100 ha) Duke Farms estate built by James Buchanan Duke, founder of the American Tobacco Company and benefactor of Duke University. Duke Farms is located on U.S. Route 206, 1.75 miles (2.82 km) south of the Somerville Circle, in Hillsborough Township in Somerset County, New Jersey, United States. The Gardens were designed and installed by Doris Duke herself, therefore several alternative names are used: The Doris Duke Indoor Display Gardens at Duke Farms, Duke Farms Indoor Display Gardens, The Doris Duke International Display Gardens, The Duke Gardens Foundation. Officially, the Gardens were The Duke Gardens Foundation, Inc, a 501(c)(3) Private Operating Foundation established 1960.

Miss Duke developed these exotic display gardens in honor of her beloved father James Buchanan Duke, Inspired by DuPont's Longwood Gardens, each of the eleven Duke Display Gardens is a full-scale re-creation of a garden theme, country or period. Display construction began in 1958. Miss Duke both designed the displays and labored on their installation, sometimes working 16-hour days. In 1960 she donated 10 acres (4.0 ha) of her estate, including the greenhouses, to the Duke Gardens Foundation, Inc.

The Duke Farms website stated that "Doris Duke had long been personally involved in the construction, repair and remodeling of her properties, and she was directly involved in the physical design of the Indoor Display Gardens. Although she lacked specific botanical knowledge, she had a clear vision of the spaces and features she wanted to create. According to the New York Post, she designed all but one of the gardens, incorporating her interests in color, design and fragrance."

Doris Duke continued her involvement with her gardens throughout her life, bringing designers with her to modify them during the summer season when they were closed to tourists. In the 1970s she added extensive night-lighting, and introduced public tours of the gardens at night. A rediscovered image of the "stunning nightlighting of the French Gardens" was used as one centerpiece of social protest against the closure.

== Description ==
Duke Gardens formed four sides of a quadrangle, and took at least one hour to view. The entry fell on the side formed by a Conservatory designed by Horace Trumbauer and constructed 1909-17. The other three sides were formed by greenhouses in styles that are still manufactured. The greenhouse over the English Garden was installed in the 1990s.

Duke Gardens were visited in the following sequence:

- Central entry into an Italian courtyard - statues amid lush plantings in the Romantic style, including a replica of Antonio Canova's sculpture The Three Graces.
- Colonial Garden - representing gardens of the South Atlantic United States, with camellias, azaleas, magnolia, and crepe myrtle.
- Edwardian Garden (Fern and Orchid House) - ferns and orchids
- French Parterre - flowers planted in a geometric parterre.
- English Gardens - five miniature gardens, including a topiary; a rock garden and herbaceous borders; an Elizabethan knot garden of the 16th and 17th centuries; and an 18th-century succulent garden.
- American Desert - cacti and succulents, including barrel cactus, giant aloe, and crown of thorns, with desert apple, aloe vera, mother-in-law's tongue, etc.
- Chinese Garden - koi stream and rock formations, with bamboo, camphor trees, bleeding heart, hybrid tulips, and jasmine.
- Japanese Garden - tea house with bonsai trees, red maples, etc.
- Indo-Persian Garden - water course, fountains, and carved marble screens, with orange trees, Mediterranean cyprus, and a Persian rose garden.
- Tropical Garden - tropical trees and vines.
- Semi-Tropical Garden - papyrus, fiddlehead ferns, Bird of Paradise, etc.

== Closure and removal ==
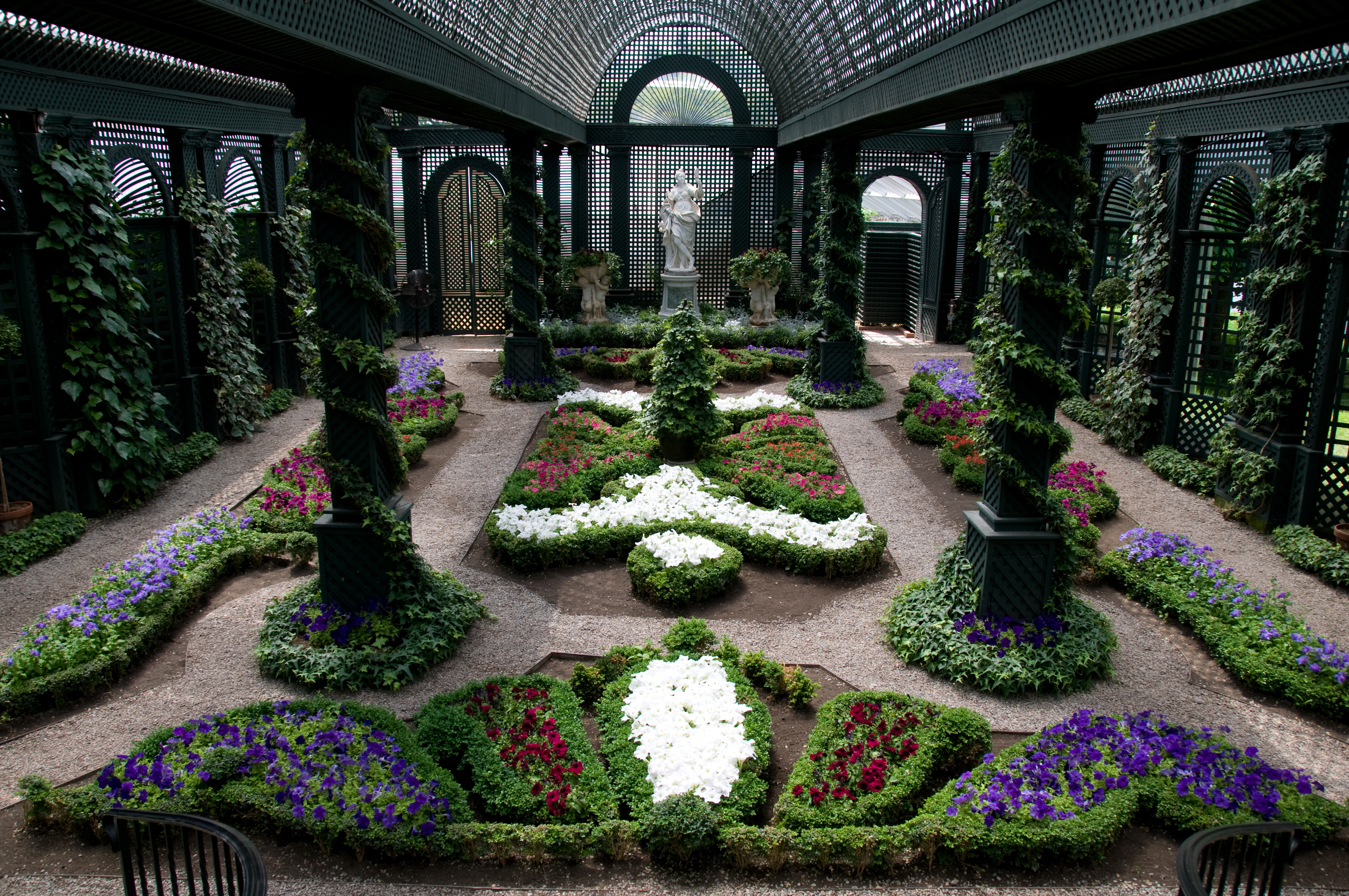
The French Garden on the day before closure. Contrast with the same garden in Miss Duke's lifetime to see effect of garden staff reductions.

In March 2008 Duke Farms announced "an expansive and bold new vision for the 2,740-acre (1,110 ha) property, in which it will refocus its programs and operations to become an environmental showcase and learning center. The first major change will be the conclusion in May 2008 of tours of the 11 indoor display gardens".

In April 2008, opposition to the closure and dismantling of the Display Gardens started to emerge, open letters appeared in the local press. A website was established, allowing protest emails to the Trustees. A usergroup to display images of the Gardens, "Save Duke Gardens" was formed on Flickr. The ongoing web campaign has received local and metropolitan coverage, and resulted in hundreds of letters to the eleven DDCF Trustees behind the decision: Joan E. Spero, (President), Nannerl O. Keohane (Chair), John J. Mack (Vice Chair), Harry Demopoulos, Anthony Fauci, James F. Gill, Anne Hawley, Peter A. Nadosy, William H. Schlesinger, John H.T. Wilson and John E. Zuccotti.

== Other gardens on Duke Farms site ==
The Duke Gardens Foundation, Inc, established in 1959 and now part of Duke Farms Foundation, must "maintain a horticultural and botanical establishment for the purpose of scientific experimentation and public education and enjoyment". With closure of Duke Gardens, the Duke Farms Foundation created new indoor and outdoor display gardens as part of Duke Farms. Indoor gardens are presented in the renovated Lord & Burnham conservatory (c.1900), now known as the Orchid Range. Duke Farms opened to the public on May 19, 2012.

== See also ==
- List of botanical gardens in the United States
