= Old Tongue =

Old Tongue or The Old Tongue may refer to:

- An ancient language
- An extinct language

== Arts and entertainment ==
- Old Tongue (poem), by Jackie Kay
- Old Tongues, a 1994 Dutch film
- The fictional languages depicted as so named in these media franchises:
  - A Song of Ice and Fire by George R. R. Martin
  - The Wheel of Time by Robert Jordan and Brandon Sanderson
  - Star Wars by George Lucas

== See also ==
- List of languages by first written accounts
- Tongue (disambiguation)
