= Tangemann =

Tangemann, Tangeman
Origin
- Language: German
- Meaning: a person from Tange
- Region of origin: Germany

Tangemann or Tangeman is a surname of German origin. It may refer to:

- Cornelius Hoagland Tangeman (1878–1928), American automobile manufacturer
- Nell Tangeman (1914–1965), American opera singer

== See also ==
- John Tangeman House, a registered historic building in Wyoming, Ohio
- Tange (disambiguation)
