= Tongue River =

Tongue River may refer to:

- Tongue River (North Dakota), U.S.
- Tongue River (Montana), a tributary of the Yellowstone River, in the U.S. states of Wyoming and Montana
  - Tongue River Dam
  - Tongue River Indian Reservation
  - Tongue River Reservoir State Park
  - Tongue River Railroad, a proposed rail line
- Tongue River (Texas), U.S.

== See also ==
- Tongue River Cave, in Dayton, Wyoming, U.S.
- Tongue River Member, a geologic member of the Fort Union Formation in North Dakota and Wyoming
- Tongue River Massacre (1820)
- Battle of the Tongue River, 1865
- Tongue Wash, in Nevada, U.S.
