= Tong =

Tong may refer to:

== Chinese ==
- Tang dynasty, a dynasty in Chinese history when transliterated from Cantonese
- Tong (organization), a type of social organization found in Chinese immigrant communities
- tong, pronunciation of several Chinese characters
- See:
  - The Chinese surnames Tang (唐 and 湯/汤) transliterated based on Cantonese
  - The Chinese surnames (佟, 童 and 仝) transliterated based on Mandarin
- Tso/Tong land of Hong Kong

== Surname ==
- Tong (surname), a Gan Chinese of Zhang, (张), (莊), Cantonese of Tang (滕), (鄧), Beijing Chinese of Tung (佟)

== People ==
- Tong Dizhou (1902–1979)
- Tong Fei (born 1961)
- Tong Guan (1054–1126)
- Tong Jian (born 1979)
- Amy Tong (born 1977), American judoka
- Anote Tong (born 1952)
- Bao Tong (1932–2022), Director of the Office of Political Reform of the CPC Central Committee and the Policy Secretary of Zhao Ziyang
- Grace Tong (born 1942)
- Jacqueline Tong (born 1951)
- Kaity Tong (born 1947)
- Kelvin Tong
- Kent Tong (born 1958)
- Lim Goh Tong (1918–2007), Malaysian Chinese businessman
- Ling Tong (189–237), military general of the state of Eastern Wu
- Ly Tong (1945–2019), Vietnamese American anti-communist activist
- Michael Tong (born 1969)
- Pete Tong (born 1960), dance music DJ and radio presenter
- Rona Tong (1916–2016), New Zealand athlete
- Ronny Tong (born 1950)
- Shen Tong (born 1968), Chinese dissident
- Simon Tong (born 1972), English musician and member of The Verve
- Stanley Tong (born 1960)
- Tong Yabgu, a 7th-century Turkish khagan
- Vincent Tong (actor) (born 1980)
- Tong Wen (born 1983)
- Wang Tong (disambiguation)
- William Tong (born c. 1970)
- Yang Tong (605–619)
- Yeo Cheow Tong (born 1947)

== Places ==
- Tong, Shropshire, a village in Shropshire, England, UK
  - Tong Castle, a large country house in Shropshire, demolished in 1954
- Tong, West Yorkshire, a village in England, UK
  - Tong (ward), an electoral division of the City of Bradford, West Yorkshire, England, UK
- Tong, Lewis, a village in the Outer Hebrides, Scotland, UK
- Tong, South Sudan, a town in Warrup State (also spelled Tonj)
- Tong District, Issyk Kul Province, Kyrgyzstan

== See also ==
- Tongs, a type of tool used to grip and lift objects
- Tongland (gang area), a name for the Calton area of Glasgow — named for a local gang, the Calton Tongs
- Tonge (disambiguation)
- Tongue (disambiguation)
