= Tang Julan =

Tang Julan تنگ جولان
- Village
- Country: Iran
- Province: Khuzestan
- County: Andika
- Bakhsh: Abezhdan
- Rural District: Kushk

Population (2006)
  - Total: 74
- Time zone: UTC+3:30 (IRST)
  - Summer (DST): UTC+4:30 (IRDT)

Tang Julan (Persian: تنگ جولان, also Romanized as Tang Jūlān) is a village in Kushk Rural District, Abezhdan District, Andika County, Khuzestan Province, Iran. At the 2006 census, its population was 74, in 11 families.
