= Tang-e Zirgol Bardar =

Tang-e Zirgol Bardar تنگزيرگل بردر
- Village
- Location within Iran
- Coordinates: 32°04′07″N 49°50′24″E
- Country: Iran
- Province: Khuzestan
- County: Izeh
- Bakhsh: Susan
- Rural District: Susan-e Gharbi

Population (2006)
  - Total: 114
- Time zone: UTC+3:30 (IRST)
  - Summer (DST): UTC+4:30 (IRDT)

Tang-e Zirgol Bardar (Persian: تنگزيرگل بردر, also Romanized as Tang-e Zīrgol Bardar; also known as Tang-e Zīrgol Darbar) is a village in Susan-e Gharbi Rural District, Susan District, Izeh County, Khuzestan Province, Iran. At the 2006 census, its population was 114, in 23 families.
