= Tonge =

Tonge may refer to:

== People ==
- Tonge (surname)

== Places in England ==
- Tonge, Bolton, an outlying area of Bolton in Greater Manchester
  - River Tonge, a river in Greater Manchester
- Tonge, Middleton, an area of Middleton in Greater Manchester
- Tonge, Kent, a village in the borough of Swale in Kent
- Tonge, Leicestershire

== See also ==
- John Tonge Centre, a mortuary in Queensland, Australia
- The following towns in the Netherlands:
  - Nieuwe-Tonge
  - Oude-Tonge
- Tong (disambiguation)
