= Zhou Tong =

Zhou Tong may refer to:

- Zhou Tong (archer) (died 1121), the second military arts tutor of Song Dynasty General Yue Fei
- Zhou Tong (Water Margin), a fictional character from the Water Margin novel
- Zhou Tong (footballer) (born 1990), Chinese footballer

== See also ==
- Zhou (surname)
