= Bình Hưng =

Bình Hưng Xã Bình Hưng Chánh Hưng, Bình Đăng, Phong Đước, An Phú, Phong Phú
- Commune
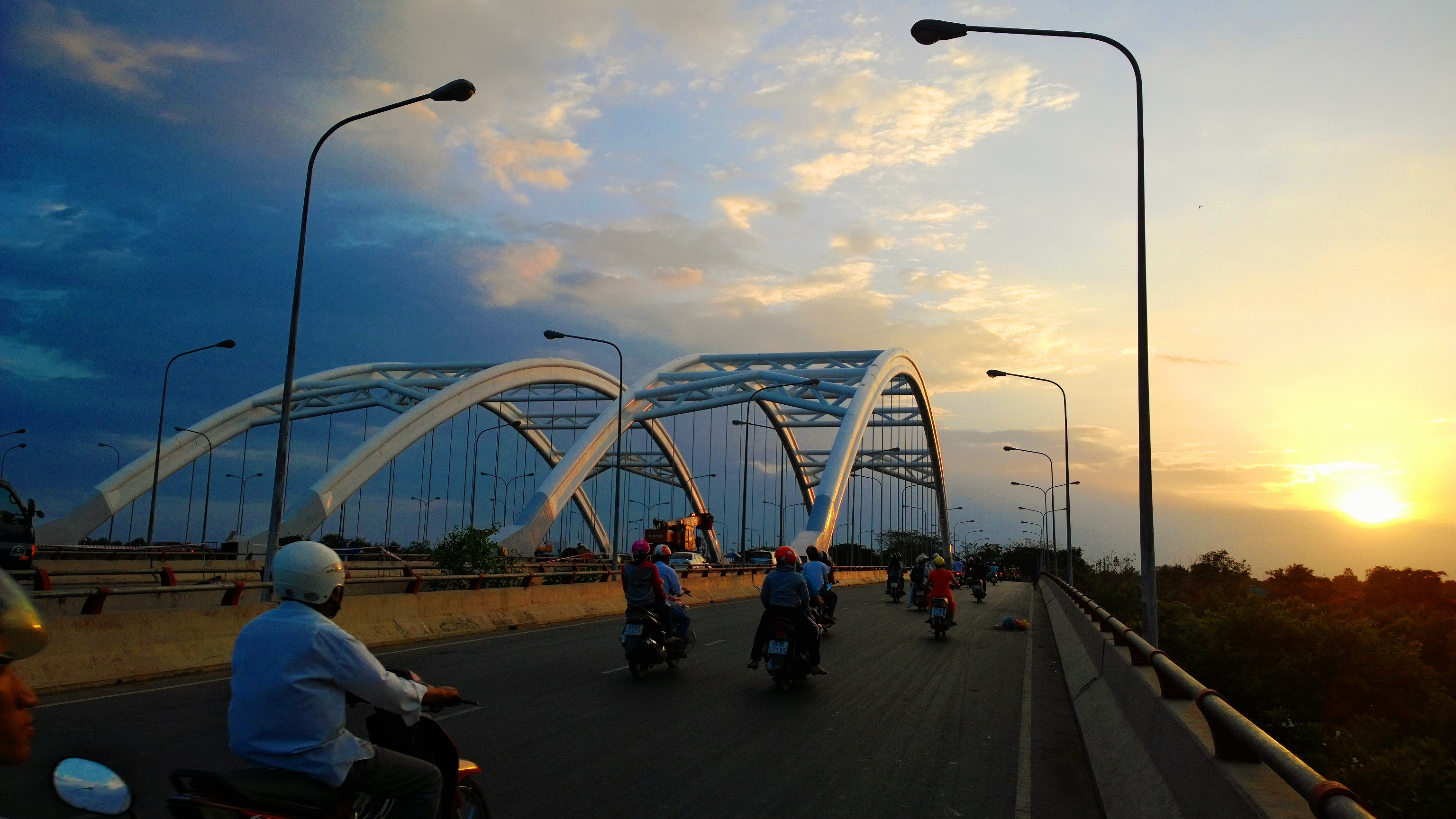
- Xóm Củi Bridge in Bình Hưng
- Interactive map of Bình Hưng
- Coordinates: 10°43′10″N 106°39′20″E
- Country: Vietnam
- Municipality: Ho Chi Minh City
- Established: June 16, 2025

Area
  - Total: 12.60 sq mi (32.63 km^{2})

Population (2024)
  - Total: 183,697
  - Density: 14,580/sq mi (5,630/km^{2})
- Time zone: UTC+07:00 (Indochina Time)
- Administrative code: 27619

Bình Hưng (Vietnamese: Xã Bình Hưng) is a commune of Ho Chi Minh City, Vietnam. It is one of the 168 new wards, communes and special zones of the city following the reorganization in 2025.

== History ==
On June 16, 2025, the National Assembly Standing Committee issued Resolution No. 1685/NQ-UBTVQH15 on the arrangement of commune-level administrative units of Ho Chi Minh City in 2025 (effective from June 16, 2025). Accordingly, the entire land area and population of Bình Hưng, Phong Phú communes of the former Bình Chánh district and a small portion of Ward 7 of the former District 8 will be integrated into a new commune named Bình Hưng (Clause 119, Article 1).
