= Wang Tong =

Wang Tong may refer to:

- Wang Tong (basketball) (born 1995), Chinese player
- Wang Tong (philosopher) (584–617), Chinese official, writer and Confucian philosopher of the Sui dynasty
- Wang Tong (footballer, born 1993)
- Wang Tong (footballer, born 1997)
