= Army of the Republic of Vietnam Special Forces =

Elite military units of the South Vietnamese army

ARVN Special Forces
- Logo Special Forces
- Active: February 1956 – 30 April 1975
- Country: South Vietnam
- Allegiance: Republic of Vietnam Armed Forces
- Branch: Army of the Republic of Vietnam
- Type: Special forces
- Size: 2,873 personnel (1965): 333 officers; 1270 NCOs; 1270 enlisted
- Garrison/HQ: Nha Trang
- Nickname: LLDB
- Engagements: Vietnam War

Commanders
- Notable commanders: Lê Quang Tung; Ngô Đình Nhu

The Army of the Republic of Vietnam Special Forces (Vietnamese: Lực Lượng Đặc Biệt Quân Lực Việt Nam Cộng Hòa — LLDB) were the elite military units of the Army of the Republic of Vietnam (ARVN). Following the establishment of the Republic of Vietnam (commonly known as South Vietnam) in October 1955, the Special Forces were formed at Nha Trang in February 1956. During the rule of Ngô Đình Diệm, the Special Forces were run by his brother, Ngô Đình Nhu, until both were assassinated in November 1963 in a coup. The Special Forces were disbanded in 1975 when South Vietnam ceased to exist after the Fall of Saigon.

== Early years ==
The Special Forces came into being at Nha Trang in February 1956 under the designation of the First Observation Battalion/Group (FOG). By 1960, most Special Forces units were involved in the FOG program. At Long Thành, they were trained in intelligence gathering, sabotage and psychological operations (PSYOP). The main duties of the Special Forces entailed the recruitment and training of one-to-four man teams in intelligence, sabotage, and psychological warfare missions in North Vietnam. The success of these missions was poor.

Although minor sabotage and unrest was fomented, Hanoi declared that all agents were to be killed or captured. Those who were captured were interrogated and executed. In 1961, the Special Forces and the Army of the Republic of Vietnam (ARVN) 1st Infantry Division, based in the northernmost area of South Vietnam, conducted a joint operation against Communist infiltrators in northern Quảng Trị Province. In the autumn of 1961, Special Forces units began Operation Eagle at Bình Hưng with a night parachute assault. In September 1962, United States Special Forces personnel assumed responsibility of the Central Intelligence Agency (CIA)'s border surveillance and Civilian Irregular Defense Group (CIDG) programs and began working with the ARVN Special Forces. The Special Forces continued to expand and began to increasingly operate with the CIDG.

== Diệm era ==
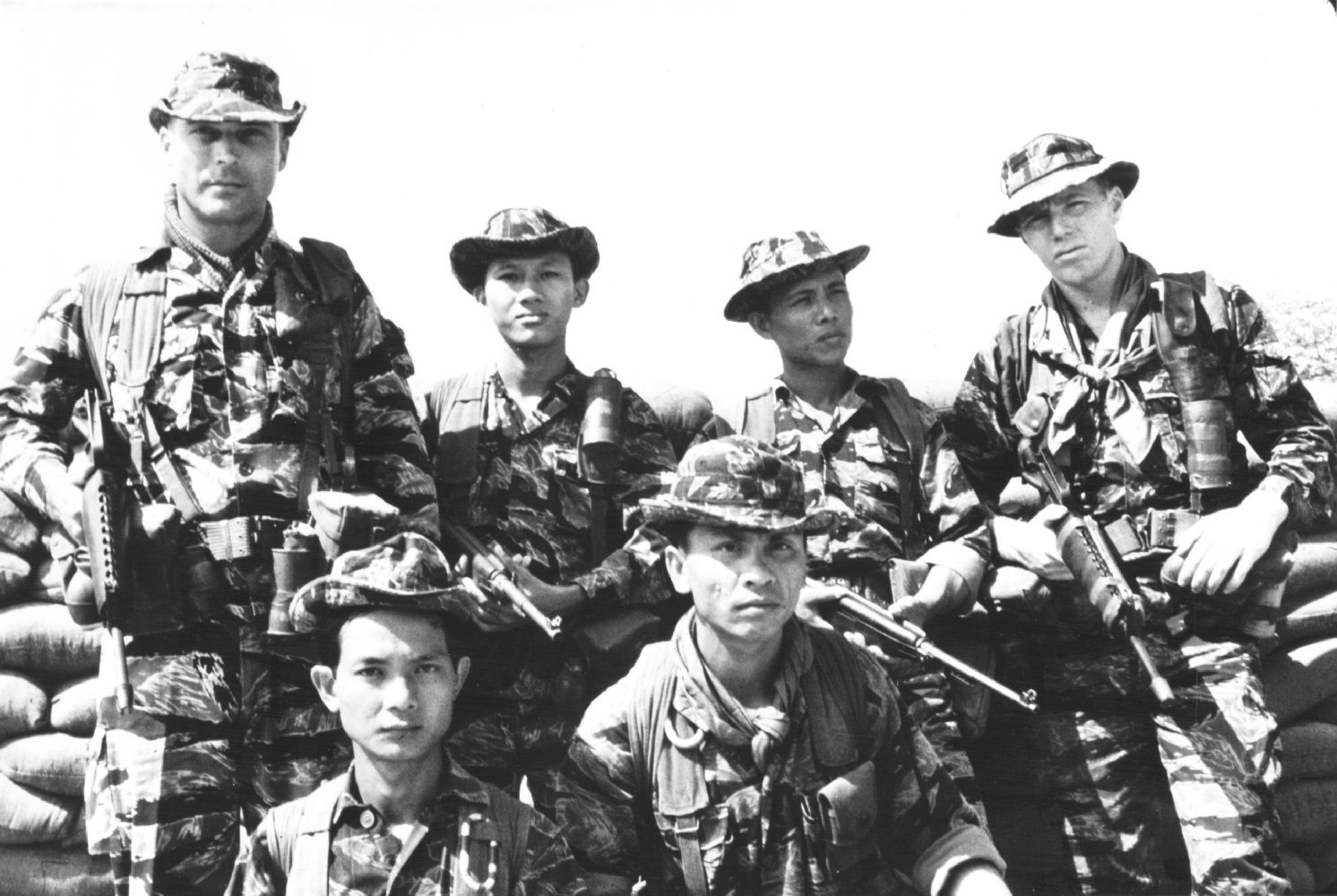
ARVN and US Special Forces

During the rule of President Ngô Đình Diệm, the Special Forces were used mainly for repressing dissidents. Despite the fact that South Vietnam was struggling against the communist insurgency of the Viet Cong in the rural areas, the Special Forces were mostly kept in the capital Saigon, where they were used to prevent coups or harass regime opponents. Under Diệm, the Special Forces were headed by Colonel Lê Quang Tung, who had been trained by the CIA in the United States and commanded some 1,840 men under the direction of Nhu. Tung's most notable military activity was leading a group run by the CIA, in which ARVN personnel of northern origin were sent into North Vietnam, posing as locals, in order to gather intelligence as well as sabotaging communist infrastructure and communications. They were trained in bases at Nha Trang, Đà Nẵng and sometimes offshore in Taiwan, Guam and Okinawa. Of the eighty groups of operatives, numbering six or seven per group, that were deployed in 1963 via parachute drops or night time sampan journeys, nearly all were captured or killed. Those who were captured were often used for propaganda by the North Vietnamese. Tung was heavily criticised for his management of the operations.

=== Buddhist crisis ===
In 1963, South Vietnam faced civil unrest in the face of Buddhist protests against discrimination by the Catholic-oriented Diệm regime. In the wake of the shootings of nine Buddhist protesters on the birthday of Gautama Buddha for defying a ban on the Buddhist flag, mass protests calling for religious equality erupted around the country. With opposition to Diệm growing, Nhu plotted an attack against Xá Lợi Pagoda, the largest Buddhist centre in Saigon, where the movement was organizing its activities. Tung's Special Forces under Nhu's orders were responsible for the raid on 21 August 1963, in which 1,400 monks were arrested and hundreds were estimated to have been killed, as well as extensive property damage. These attacks were replicated across the country in a synchronised manner. Following the attacks, U.S. officials threatened to withhold aid to the Special Forces unless they were used in fighting communists, rather than attacking dissidents.

Another infamous religious assault on the Buddhist community was carried out by Tung's men in 1963. In a small pond near Đà Nẵng, a hugely oversized carp was found swimming. Local Buddhists began to believe the fish was a reincarnation of one of Gautama Buddha's disciples. As pilgrimages to the pond grew larger and more frequent, so did disquiet among the district chief and his officials, who answered to Ngô Đình Cẩn, another younger brother of Diệm. The pond was mined, but the fish swam on unhindered. After raking the pond with machine gun fire, the fish still lived. To deal with the problem, Tung's forces were called in. The pond was grenaded, killing the carp. The incident generated more publicity as newspapers across the world ran stories about the miraculous fish. ARVN helicopters began landing at the site, with ARVN paratroopers filling their bottles with water which they believed had magical powers. Tung was reported to have been planning an operation at the request of Nhu to stage a government organised student demonstration outside the US Embassy, Saigon. In this plan, Tung and his operatives would assassinate U.S. ambassador Henry Cabot Lodge Jr., other key officials and Buddhist leader Thích Trí Quang, who was given asylum after being targeted in the pagoda raids. On 1 November 1963, a coup was launched by the ARVN against Diệm. Knowing Tung was a loyalist who would order his Special Forces to defend Diệm, the generals invited him to Joint General Staff (JGS) headquarters on the pretext of a routine meeting. He was arrested and later executed along with his deputy and younger brother, Lê Quang Triệu. Diệm and Nhu were also executed after being captured at the end of the successful coup and the ARVN's leadership consequently changed.

In 1964, the U.S. Army's 5th Special Forces Group was officially assigned to Vietnam. The LLDB worked closely with the U.S. command and although the Americans funded the CIDG camps, the LLDB assumed ultimate responsibility. These camps were commanded by the ARVN Special Forces, supplemented by U.S. Special Forces advisors. From 24 June to 1 July 1964 under Project DELTA, LLDB teams performed five parachute drops into Laos to gather intelligence. By 1965, LLDB personnel were working with the ARVN in recruiting and training as well as sending groups into communist areas in South Vietnam to gather information. US Special Forces referred to the LLDB as "LL" or "LIMA-LIMA" using the phonetic alphabet. Over the radio they were called "XRAY" so it would not reveal the unit as CIDG.

== 1970s ==
In March 1970, aware of the impending withdrawal of U.S. Special Forces from Vietnam as part of a general withdrawal, the U.S. Military Assistance Command, Vietnam (MACV) agreed to convert CIDG camps into ARVN Border Ranger camps. The most highly regarded of the CIDG units, the Mobile Strike Force followed the conversion and integration into the ARVN as well. The LLDB were eventually disbanded in December 1970. The former indigenous reconnaissance team personnel previously assigned to work with MACV-SOG (the US military reconnaissance office for MACV) were regrouped into the Intelligence Directorate of the Joint General Staff (JGS). This directorate was usually known by the nickname "the 7th Technical Directorate" and was divided into three sections:

- the Coastal Defense Office to deal with and manage all maritime-related reconnaissance activities.
- the Liaison Office to manage the reconnaissance and military intelligence in the northern part of South Vietnam and the adjoining tri-border area (Vietnam, Laos and Cambodia).
- the Topography Office to manage the field reconnaissance activities within South Vietnam.

The ARVN also fielded an airborne-qualified special strike unit, 81st Airborne Ranger group (Vietnamese: Liên đoàn 81 Biệt cách dù), under the direct command of the JGS. It can be counted as part of the Special Forces and was under the Special Forces command, later being placed under the JGS command. The unit was bloodied during the 1968 Tet Offensive and the 1972 Easter Offensive when it was launched into battle to relieve the garrison of An Lộc northwest of Saigon from a People's Army of Vietnam siege. Some former LLDB personnel were formed into a new clandestine unit, the Vietnamese Special Mission Service (SMS), while others went to serve in the Republic of Vietnam National Police Field Force (Vietnamese: Cãnh Sát Dã Chiên – CSDC). Approximately 5,000 personnel served in the Special Forces during the Vietnam War.

== Effectiveness ==
The LLDB's largest operation occurred with the CIDGs, an immense network of ethnic minorities and Montagnards funded and trained with CIA-U.S. Special Forces resources. Historically, the South Vietnamese considered such minorities inferior, especially the semi-primitive mountain tribes, and this diminished effective cooperation and a mutual sense of purpose between the LLDB and its Central Highland militia. Command and control was frequently strained, a factor that contributed to an unsuccessful rebellion in September 1964 by tribal groups loyal to the United Front for the Liberation of Oppressed Races (FULRO).

The degree to which the tribal minorities influenced the war cannot be underestimated. They provided intelligence, acted as scouts, and in many cases became effective guerrilla soldiers. Thus, the South Vietnamese, despite their racist attitudes, needed the assistance they received from the Montagnards, and U.S. Special Forces and Australian Special Air Service (SAS) advisers acted as intermediaries when clashes occurred between the LLDB and the Montagnards. Ultimately, however, the advisers could not exercise complete jurisdiction because the South Vietnamese were technically, though not realistically, in charge of these programs. During the period of Vietnamization (1969–1972), the number of U.S. advisers was reduced, then eliminated, which forced the LLDB to assume complete control over tens of thousands of ethnic troops, which the ethnic troops resented.
