= Native Tongue =

Native Tongue(s) may refer to:

== Books ==
- Native Tongues (book), a non-fiction book about languages by Charles Berlitz published in 1982
- Native Tongue (Carl Hiaasen novel), a novel by Carl Hiaasen published in 1991
- Native Tongue (Elgin novel), a feminist science fiction novel by American writer Suzette Haden Elgin published in 1984

== Language ==
- First language, the language a human being learns from birth
- Native tongue title, a term referring to compensation for linguicide

== Music ==
- Native Tongues, an American hip hop collective
- Native Tongue (Poison album), 1993
- Native Tongue (Switchfoot album), 2019
- Native Tongue, a 2018 album and single of the same name by Australian singer-songwriter Mo'Ju
- "Native Tongue", a song by Sara Groves from her 2015 album Floodplain
