= Lê Quang Tung =

South Vietnamese soldier (1919–1963)

- Born: 13 June 1919; Hương Trà District, Annam, French Indochina
- Died: 1 November 1963 (aged 44); Tân Sơn Nhứt Air Base, Saigon, South Vietnam
- Military career
- Allegiance: Cần Lao Party
- Service years: 1950s–1963
- Rank: Colonel
- Commands: Commander, Army of the Republic of Vietnam Special Forces
- Conflicts: Buddhist Crisis: Xá Lợi Pagoda raids; 1963 South Vietnamese coup d'état (executed)

Colonel Lê Quang Tung (13 June 1919 – 1 November 1963) was the commander of the Army of the Republic of Vietnam Special Forces under the command of Ngô Đình Nhu. Nhu was the brother of South Vietnam's president, Ngô Đình Diệm. A former servant of the Ngô family, Tung's military background was in security and counterespionage.

During the 1950s, Tung was a high-ranking official in Nhu's Cần Lao, a secret political apparatus which maintained the Ngô family's grip on power, extorting money from wealthy businessmen. In 1960, Tung was promoted directly to the rank of colonel and became the commander of the special forces. His period at the helm of South Vietnam's elite troops was noted mostly for his work in repressing dissidents, rather than fighting the Viet Cong insurgents. His best-known attack was the raid on Xá Lợi pagoda on 21 August 1963, in which hundreds died or disappeared.

Tung's main military programme was a scheme in which Army of the Republic of Vietnam personnel attempted to infiltrate North Vietnam in order to engage in intelligence gathering and sabotage. The program was ineffective; the vast majority of infiltrators were killed or captured. Tung was also reported to be planning an assassination attempt on Henry Cabot Lodge Jr., the United States ambassador to South Vietnam.

Following the pagoda raids, the United States terminated funding to Tung's men because they were used as a political tool rather than against the communists. Along with Diệm and Nhu, Tung was assassinated during the November 1963 coup. Nhu and Tung had been preparing a fake coup and counter-coup in order to give a false demonstration of the regime's strength. However, the pair were unaware that General Tôn Thất Đính, who was planning the phony operation, was involved in the real coup plot. Đính tricked Tung into sending his men into the countryside, leaving the regime in Saigon without the protection of the special forces. This led to the easy overthrow of the regime.

== Early career ==
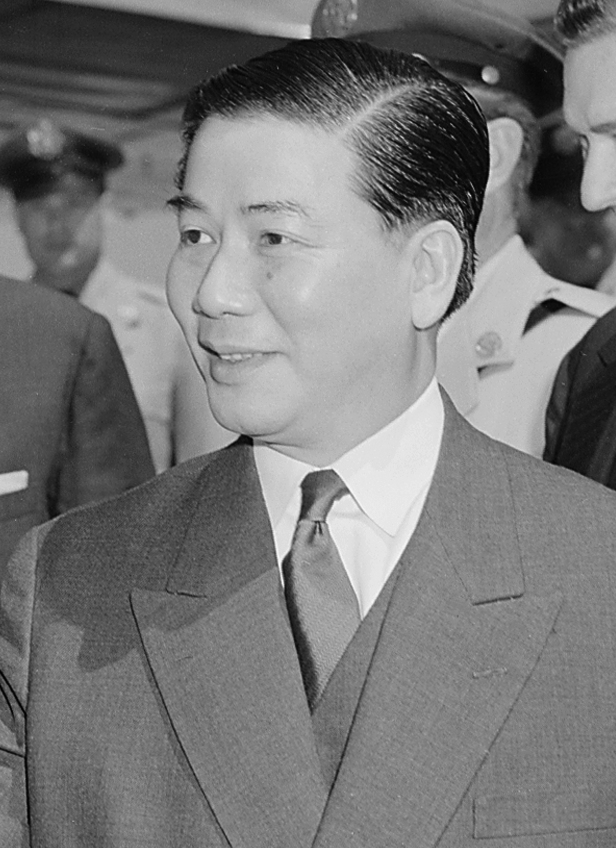
President Ngô Đình Diệm

Tung was born on 13 June 1919, in central Vietnam, which was then the protectorate of Annam in French Indochina. The former servant of the Ngô family was devoutly Roman Catholic, short and bespectacled. Tung had a military background almost entirely in security and counterespionage, which was an unusual basis for leading the special forces. Tung had first served the French as a security officer in Central Vietnam. He then worked for Diệm as a lieutenant in the military security service in Central Vietnam. As a high-ranking official in Nhu's Cần Lao, the secret Catholic political apparatus which maintained the Ngô family's grip on power, Tung raised party funds by extorting money from wealthy businessmen. Tung was primarily known among colleagues for his unwavering loyalty to Diệm. In 1960, he was promoted straight to the rank of colonel and placed in charge of the special forces. The Central Intelligence Agency (CIA) regarded Tung as the third most powerful man in South Vietnam behind Diệm and Nhu, thereby ranking him as South Vietnam's most powerful military officer.

== Head of special forces ==
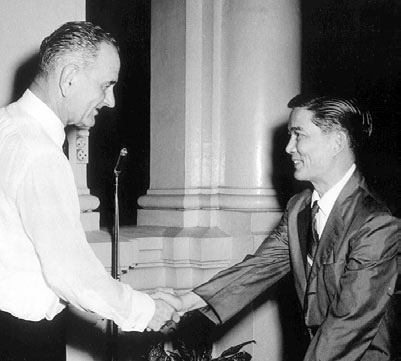
Ngô Đình Nhu (right), shaking hands with then US Vice President Lyndon B. Johnson in 1961

Tung had been trained by the CIA in the United States. A Diệm loyalist, he led a force of 1,840 men, which operated under the direction of Nhu rather than the army command. He did not conduct operations against the communist Việt Cộng insurgents, but used his forces mainly in Saigon to repress opponents of the Diệm regime. Tung's most notable attacks occurred during the Buddhist crisis of 1963. During this period, the Buddhist majority engaged in mass protests against the pro-Catholic policies of the Diệm regime.

On 21 August 1963, Tung's men, acting on Nhu's orders, raided the Xá Lợi Pagoda, Saigon's main Buddhist temple. The attacks were replicated across the nation, leaving a death toll estimated to be in the hundreds. The pagodas suffered extensive damage and a further 1,400 monks and nuns were arrested. The attacks occurred after Nhu had tricked a group of Army of the Republic of Vietnam (ARVN) generals into agreeing to declare martial law. He knew the generals were plotting and hoped to exploit martial law to overthrow his brother, but outmanoeuvred them by sending Tung's special forces into the pagodas disguised as regular ARVN soldiers. As a result, South Vietnam's Buddhist majority initially thought the regular army had attacked the monks, damaging its generals' credibility among the populace as potential leaders of the country. Following the attacks, U.S. officials threatened to withhold aid to the special forces unless they were used to fight communists rather than attacking political or religious dissidents.

Another notable religious attack was perpetrated by Tung's men in 1963. A hugely oversized carp was found swimming in a small pond near the central city of Đà Nẵng. Local Buddhists began to believe that the fish was a reincarnation of one of Gautama Buddha's disciples. As more people made pilgrimages to the pond, so disquiet grew among the district chief and his subordinates, who answered to Ngô Đình Cẩn, another younger brother of Diệm. The officials mined the pond, but the fish survived. They raked the pond with machine gun fire, but the carp again escaped death. To deal with the tenacious fish, they called in Tung's special forces. Tung's men grenaded the pond, finally killing the carp. The killing backfired, because it generated more publicity – many newspapers across the world ran stories about the miraculous fish. ARVN helicopters began landing at the site, with paratroopers filling their bottles with water that they believed to be magical.

Tung also headed a group run by the CIA, in which ARVN personnel of northern origin infiltrated North Vietnam, posing as locals. The objective was to gather intelligence and sabotage communist infrastructure and communications facilities. The recruits were trained in bases at Nha Trang, Đà Nẵng, and sometimes offshore in Taiwan, Guam and Okinawa. Around eighty groups of operatives, each numbering six or seven men, were deployed in 1963. They entered the north via parachute drops or sampan journeys at night, but nearly all were captured or killed. The captives were frequently used in communist propaganda broadcasts. Tung was criticised for his management of the operations.

At Nhu's request, Tung was reported to have been planning an operation under the cover of a government-organised student demonstration outside the US Embassy, Saigon. In this plan, Tung's men would assassinate ambassador Henry Cabot Lodge Jr. and other key officials among the confusion. Another target was the Buddhist leader Thích Trí Quang, who had been given asylum in the embassy after being targeted in the pagoda raids. According to the plan, Tung's men would then burn down the embassy.

== U.S. sanctions ==
Following the pagoda raids, the U.S. began exploring the possibility of replacing Diệm. Cable 243 informed the US embassy to look for alternative leadership if Diệm did not remove Nhu. In September, the Krulak–Mendenhall mission was despatched to South Vietnam to analyse the domestic situation and the war against the communists. One of the resulting suggestions was to terminate funding of the special forces as an expression of disapproval of Tung and Nhu's actions. Another was to run covert campaigns to discredit Tung. The Krulak–Mendenhall mission ended in a stalemate, so the Kennedy administration followed up with the McNamara–Taylor mission. The second expedition resulted in the suspension of funding for the special forces until they were placed under the command of the army's Joint General Staff (JGS) and sent into battle.

The McNamara–Taylor mission's report noted that one of the reasons for sending Tung's men into the field was because they "are a continuing support for Diệm". The Americans were aware that removing the special forces from Saigon would increase the chances that a coup would succeed, thereby encouraging the army to overthrow the president. Diệm and Nhu were undeterred by the suspension of aid, keeping Tung and his men in the capital. In private talks with US officials, Diệm insisted that the army was responsible for the pagoda attacks and that Tung's men were already under the control of the JGS.

== Coup and assassination ==
By September, Diệm and Nhu knew that a group of generals were planning a coup. Nhu ordered Tung and Tôn Thất Đính – a loyalist general who commanded the ARVN III Corps which encompassed the Saigon region – to plan a fake coup against the government. One objective was to trick anti-government dissidents into joining the false uprising so that they could be identified and eliminated. Another aim was to provide a public relations stunt that would give a false impression of the strength of the regime.

Codenamed Operation Bravo, the first stage of the scheme involved some of Tung's loyalist soldiers, disguised as insurgents, faking a coup. Tung would then announce the formation of a "revolutionary government" consisting of opposition activists, while Diệm and Nhu pretended to be on the run. During the orchestrated chaos of the first coup, the disguised loyalists would riot and in the ensuing mayhem, kill the leading coup plotters, such as Generals Dương Văn Minh, Trần Văn Đôn, Lê Văn Kim and junior officers that were helping them. Tung's men and some of Nhu's underworld connections were also to kill some figures who were assisting the conspirators, such as the titular but relatively powerless Vice President Nguyễn Ngọc Thơ, CIA officer Lucien Conein, who was on assignment in Vietnam as a military adviser, and Ambassador Lodge. These would then be blamed on "neutralist and pro-communist elements". This was to be followed by a fake "counter-coup", whereupon Tung's special forces, having left Saigon on the pretext of fighting communists, as well as Đính's forces would triumphantly re-enter Saigon to reaffirm the Diệm regime. Nhu would then exploit the scare to round up dissidents.

However, Nhu and Tung were unaware that Đính was part of the real coup plot. The III Corps commander told Tung that the counter-coup needed to employ an overwhelming amount of force. He said that tanks were required "because armour is dangerous". In an attempt to outwit Tung, Đính said that fresh troops were needed, opining:

If we move reserves into the city, the Americans will be angry. They'll complain that we're not fighting the war. So we must camouflage our plan by sending the special forces out to the country. That will deceive them.

The loyalists were unaware that Đính's real intention was to engulf Saigon with his rebel divisions and lock Tung's loyalists in the countryside where they could not defend the president. Tung and the palace agreed to send all four Saigon-based special forces companies out of the capital of Saigon on 29 October 1963.

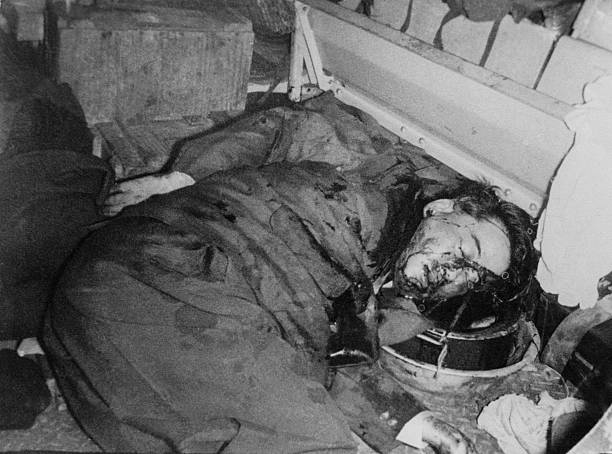
The body of Diệm in the back of an armoured personnel carrier. The president had been executed on the way to military headquarters.

On 1 November 1963, Tung was summoned by the coup organisers to the Joint General Staff headquarters near Tân Sơn Nhứt Air Base, on the pretext of a routine officers' lunch meeting. At 13:30, General Trần Văn Đôn announced that a coup was taking place. Most of the officers rose to applaud, but Tung did not. He was taken away by Nguyễn Văn Nhung, the bodyguard of General Minh. As he was led away, Tung shouted "Remember who gave you your stars!"

During the early stages of the coup, the rebels forced Tung to order his men to surrender. This meant that only the Presidential Guard was left to defend Gia Long Palace. At 16:45, Tung was forced at gunpoint to talk to Diệm on the phone, telling the president that he had told his men to surrender. Minh ordered Nhung to execute the Diệm loyalist. Tung had failed to convince the president to surrender and still commanded the loyalty of his men. The other generals had little sympathy, since the special forces commander had disguised his men in army uniforms and framed the generals for the pagoda raids. The generals were aware of the threat Tung posed; they had discussed his elimination during their planning, having contemplated waging an offensive against his special forces.

At nightfall he was taken with Major Lê Quang Triệu, his brother and deputy, hands tied, into a jeep and driven to edge of the air base. Forced to kneel over two freshly dug holes, the brothers were shot into their graves and buried. The coup was successful, and on the following morning, Diệm and Nhu were captured and executed.
