= Mother-in-law's tongue =

Mother-in-law's tongue may refer to the following plant species:

- Dracaena hyacinthoides
- Dracaena trifasciata
