= Tongue Wash =

Coordinates: 37°10′18″N 116°06′43″W

Location
- Country: United States
- State: Nevada
- County: Nye County

Tongue Wash is a wash in Nye County, Nevada, in the United States.

Tongue Wash was likely named because it is shaped like a tongue.
