= Phan Quang Đán =

South Vietnamese doctor and politician (1918–2004)

Doctor Phan Quang Đán
- Dr. Đán in 1955

Deputy Prime Minister of South Vietnam
- In office 18 February 1974 – 14 April 1975 Serving with Nguyễn Lưu Viên
- Prime Minister: Trần Thiện Khiêm (until 4/4 1975); Nguyễn Bá Cẩn (4/4-14/4 1975)
- Preceded by: Trần Thiện Khiêm
- Succeeded by: Dương Kích Nhưỡng; Trần Văn Đôn

Personal details
- Born: 6 November 1918 Nghệ An Province, Annam, French Indochina
- Died: 26 March 2004 (aged 85) Florida, United States
- Party: Đại Việt Nationalist Party; Independent
- Other political affiliations: National Social Democratic Front (big tent coalition)
- Children: Phan Quang Tuệ; Phan Quang Tuấn
- Profession: Doctor; Politician

Phan Quang Đán ([faːŋ˧ waːŋ˧ ʔɗaːŋ˦˥]; 6 November 1918 – 26 March 2004) was a Vietnamese political opposition figure who was one of only two non-government politicians who won a seat in the 1959 South Vietnamese election for the National Assembly. Subsequently, he was arrested by the forces of President Ngô Đình Diệm and not allowed to take his seat. The most prominent dissident during the rule of Diệm, he is remembered more for his incarceration than his activities after Diệm's fall, when he became a cabinet minister.

Trained as a doctor, Đán first entered politics in 1945 when the Japanese occupation of Vietnam ended and several local groups challenged French attempts to re-establish colonial power. Đán briefly joined several political parties and started his newspaper account, turning down offers of a cabinet position from the communist-dominated Viet Minh to assist former Emperor Bảo Đại as an advisor and briefly as Minister of Information of the State of Vietnam before resigning, citing French reluctance to confer full autonomy. He then completed a PhD at Harvard University while continuing his activism from afar, writing several political treatises.

Upon returning to South Vietnam, Đán was involved in negotiations with Diệm, but did not join the government, and then became the center of open opposition to Diệm, starting the Democratic Opposition Bloc and the Thời Luận newspaper, which stridently criticized the government. Despite ransackings by a mob of regime supporters, the newspaper's closure by a government court, and his blacklisting from university employment, Đán continued his opposition activities and was elected to the National Assembly in 1959, but was prevented from taking his seat. He then joined the paratroopers' coup of 1960 as a spokesperson after it started and was then jailed in a labor camp when Diệm loyalists crushed the revolt. Đán was released in 1963 upon Diệm's overthrow and assassination, and went on to become foreign minister and deputy prime minister before escaping Vietnam during the Fall of Saigon.

== Early years ==
Phan Quang Đán was born as Phan Huy Đán in the north central province of Nghệ An, Annam, French Indochina. His father was Dr. Phan Huy Thịnh from Hà Đông. Đán studied for a period in a seminary, and was an American-trained OSS (now CIA) agent during the Second World War. He studied medicine in Hanoi when he entered politics in 1945 following the collapse of the Japanese occupation. This ushered in a period of political ferment as Ho Chi Minh and his Viet Minh proclaimed the creation of the Democratic Republic of Vietnam and battled French Union forces who attempted to regain control of the country. He briefly joined the Vietnamese People's Party and the Great Vietnam Civil Servants Party before forming a newspaper based group named "Thiết Thực". According to his account, he twice turned down Vietminh offers of a cabinet position in 1946 to follow Emperor Bảo Đại to China and Hong Kong. There during 1947 and 1948, he was an advisor as Bảo Đại attempted to negotiate a return to Vietnam with the French. When a Provisional Central Government was established in 1948 with Bảo Đại's blessing, Đán joined it as Minister of Information. He resigned after several months, citing the French reluctance to grant the government any powers to facilitate Vietnamese autonomy, noting that they wanted to 'reestablish the old colonial regime'. During this period working for Bao Dai, Đán worked closely with Nghiêm Xuân Thiện. The pair were members of the Đại Việt Nationalist Party and later worked on the Thời Luận newspaper together. In 1949, Đán formed his group, the Republican Party (Cong Hoa Dang), and went abroad to study for his PhD at the Harvard School of Public Health while continuing his political activities. In 1951, he published his political treatise Volonté Vietnamienne, articulating his vision for an independent non-Communist Vietnam. This included multiparty democratic elections. His political activities spread to his academic work; his thesis Vietnam's Health: Present Conditions and Proposals of Reorganization references Vietnam's political future. According to Cao Văn Luận, a Catholic priest and academic in South Vietnam and was a former seminary colleague of Đán, Diem and Đán were in contact while the pair were in political exile in the US in the 1950s. Luan believed that Diem, who was appointed prime minister by Bao Dai in 1954, assumed that Đán was receptive to him as a politician. In August 1955, one month before returning to Vietnam, Đán published a Vietnamese translation of Volonté Vietnamienne.

The reason for Đán's exclusion from further Bảo Đại and then Ngo Dinh Diem cabinets is disputed. Đán said that it was due to Diem being appointed by Bảo Đại. Still, the government maintained that it was because he was holding out for a more important ministry, having allegedly rejected an offer to become the Minister for Social Welfare. For his part, Đán later claimed that he rebuffed Diem because he 'never intended to cooperate with Diệm', who he asserted could not administer a government that could democratically modernise Vietnam, but instead was set on feudal and nepotistic rule. Đán claimed that upon his return to Vietnam in September 1955, Diem's officials sought him out at the airport to arrange a meeting at the Norodom Palace. Đán claimed that he reprimanded Diem for running a nepotistic regime and relying on the counsel of his younger brother Ngo Dinh Nhu, and stated his intention to contribute to South Vietnamese politics by organising 'a constructive, legal opposition'. According to the historian Jason Picard, Diem viewed Đán's publications and remarks as disrespectful and a challenge to his political authority.

== Diem era career ==
In October, Diem proclaimed himself the President of the newly proclaimed Republic of Vietnam after defeating Bao Dai in a fraudulent referendum and from then on, Đán was the centre of much of the open opposition to Diem's regime. First he headed a coalition of opposition groups which fought the government's arrangements for the 1956 election of a Constituent Assembly. The coalition had three component groups with government approval: The National Restoration League, the Socialist Party and the Social Democratic Party. Three months after the elections for the Constituent Assembly, the coalition collapsed when the leaders of the first two parties were jailed and the third party threatened into dissolution. Đán was briefly arrested on the eve of the 1956 elections, and accused by government controlled media of involvement in communist and colonialist activities. He had penned a letter to Diem in which he accused the regime of using dictatorial methods. He was then sacked under secret government orders from his position at the University of Saigon Faculty of Medicine, and blacklisted from holding academic positions at universities and placed under continuous police surveillance.

Undeterred, he continued his political activities and in May 1957 formed another opposition coalition called the Democratic Opposition Bloc (Khối Dân Chủ Đối Lập). At its launch, he stated 'Two fundamental weaknesses facing the southern regime today are the total absence of an independent press and an opposition camp both recognized and tolerated by the ruling authority', and stated that they would for the promotion of democratic processes in South Vietnam.

The group had their own newspaper, the Thời Luận, which was revamped to coincide with the launch of the new party. These announcements were timed to coincide with Diem's state visit to the US, provoking an angry reaction in private from the president. Over the next year until its shutdown, Thời Luận became the most popular newspaper in the country, averaging around 100,000 copies per issue, which was quadruple the circulation of rival newspapers. It sold in the capital Saigon and was distributed through the black market across the country, trumpeting itself as the outlet of those who could not speak. It stated its purpose as:

To defend the rights of the citizenry: individual freedom; freedom of speech and press; freedom of assembly and association . . . The intent is to promote debate on significant issues shaping the future of the nation. The existence of opposition, of debate, can improve government. This is only prohibited under dictatorships, where governments treat citizens as objects to be exploited. In a free, democratic society, the people have the right to speak out.

The newspaper generated attention for its open and combative criticism of Diem's regime.

Its office was ransacked by a government organised mob in September 1957, and was closed down in March 1958 by a government court order. Đán withdrew from the Democratic Bloc in April 1958 and the group collapsed as Đán sought to set up the Free Democratic Party and permission to publish a newspaper. Neither applications were approved, and various members of Đán's party were arrested for their political activities. In 1959, two newspapers were shut down after they published Đán's articles.

Đán openly criticized the main platform of American economic development aid to South Vietnam, the Commercial Import Program. This allowed licensed importers to buy US dollars at rates far lower than the official exchange rate, and then buy American goods with it. Instead of importing capital goods to fuel industrialization, the money was mostly spent on consumer goods to create an urban upper-class loyal to the government. Đán said "The U.S. Commercial Import Program—which costs us nothing—brings in on a massive scale luxury goods of all kinds, which give us an artificial society—enhanced material conditions that don't amount to anything, and no sacrifice; it brings luxury to our ruling group and middle class, and luxury means corruption."

=== Election and disbarring ===
On 30 August 1959, Đán ran for the National Assembly in a constituency in Saigon and was elected by a 6–1 ratio over Diem's government candidate. This came despite 8000 Army of the Republic of Vietnam soldiers being bused from out of district to stuff ballot boxes to support the government candidate. He was regarded as a nationalist anti-communist who was one of the most able political figures in the country.

Despite strong protests from the US and UK embassies, Diem was adamant that Đán would not be able to take his seat. When the Assembly was inaugurated, Đán was confronted by police and put under arrest as he attempted to leave his medical clinic to attend the session. Đán was charged with electoral fraud, on the grounds that he supposedly offered free medical care to induce voters to support him. He pointed out that if this were the case, then he would have run for election in the district in which his practice was located, to maximize the number of patients who were in his voting district.

=== Imprisonment ===
In November 1960, ARVN paratroopers attempted a coup against Diem. As the attempt unfolded, Đán agreed to become a spokesperson for the coup leaders. He cited political mismanagement of the war against the Vietcong and the government's refusal to broaden its political base as the reason for the revolt. Đán spoke on Radio Vietnam and staged a media conference during which a rebel paratrooper pulled a portrait of the president from the wall, ripped it and stamped on it.

However, the plot leaders stalled their coup when Diem falsely promised reform. Diem then crushed the rebels and Đán was arrested, tortured and sentenced to eight years of hard labour in the penal colony on Poulo Condore where the French had once imprisoned Vietnamese nationalists. Were it not for western protests, Diem would have had Đán executed. As a result of the successful coup in 1963 in which Diem was deposed and assassinated, Đán was released from prison. Đán was garlanded and taken to military headquarters.

== Later career ==
In 1966 he was elected to the Constituent Assembly and unsuccessfully contested the 1967 Presidential election. He then became foreign affairs minister and later the deputy prime minister for social welfare and refugees. His most prominent role was to resettle thousands of displaced war victims and refugees. When South Vietnam fell in 1975, Đán left for the United States.

== Books ==
- The Republic of Vietnam’s Environment & People. Saigon, 1975.

== Honors ==
- Grand Cordon of the Order of Brilliant Star (Taiwan, 1971)

== See also ==
- Operation Frequent Wind
