= Bỉm Sơn =

- Ward
- Interactive map of Bỉm Sơn
- Coordinates: 20.0839462298799°N 105.86259095930455°E
- Country: Vietnam
- Region: North Central Coast
- Province: Thanh Hóa
- Established: 16 June 2025
- Administrative headquarters: 28 Trần Phú Street, Residential Group 2

Area
  - Total: 51.84 km^{2} (20.02 sq mi)

Population (2024)
  - Total: 45,997
  - Density: 887/km^{2} (2,300/sq mi)
- Postal code: 40714
- Website: bimson.thanhhoa.gov.vn

Bỉm Sơn is a ward in Thanh Hóa province, Vietnam. The ward inherited its name from the former Bỉm Sơn town.

The territory of present-day Bỉm Sơn Ward consists of the central and eastern wards of the former Bỉm Sơn town, together with Hà Vinh commune, which was geographically separated from the other communes and townships of Hà Trung district.

On 16 June 2025, Bỉm Sơn town and Hà Trung district were dissolved as part of the 2025 Vietnamese administrative reform, which abolished the district-level administrative system. Bỉm Sơn Ward was established under Resolution No. 1686/NQ-UBTVQH15 of the Standing Committee of the National Assembly of Vietnam, through the merger of the entire area and population of:

- Đông Sơn, Lam Sơn, and Ba Đình wards, formerly part of Bỉm Sơn town
- Hà Vinh commune, formerly part of Hà Trung district
