= Ngo Dinh Diem presidential visit to Australia =

1957 official visit by South Vietnamese president

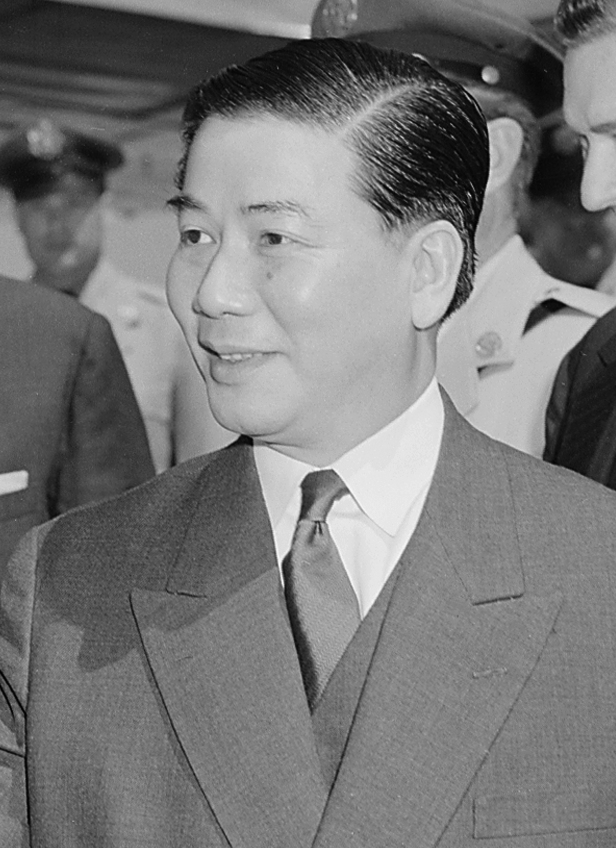
Ngô Đình Diệm visited Australia and the United States in 1957.

The Ngô Đình Diệm presidential visit to Australia from 2 to 9 September 1957 was an official visit by the first president of the Republic of Vietnam. It was part of a year of travelling for Diệm, who made official visits to the United States and other anti-communist countries. As with his American trip, Diệm was warmly and lavishly received during the height of the Cold War, garnering bipartisan praise from both the Liberal Party of Australia of Prime Minister Robert Menzies and the opposition Australian Labor Party (ALP).

Diệm addressed the Parliament of Australia and was made an honorary Knight Grand Cross of the Order of St Michael and St George, one of the highest imperial honours that can be bestowed on a non-British subject—at the time, Australians were also British subjects. Diệm did not engage in substantive political discussions with the Australian leaders and he spent most of his time at public functions. He was universally extolled by the media, which praised him for what they perceived to be a successful, charismatic, democratic and righteous rule in South Vietnam, overlooking his authoritarianism, election fraud and other corrupt practices. The Australian Catholic leadership and media were particularly glowing towards the South Vietnamese head of state. A member of Vietnam's Catholic minority and the brother of Vietnam's leading archbishop, Diệm had pursued policies in Vietnam favoring his co-religionists. He exempted the Catholic Church from land redistribution, gave them more aid and job promotions, and allowed Catholic paramilitaries to attack Buddhists, who formed the religious majority.

Diệm's visit was a highmark in relations between Australia and South Vietnam. Over time, Diệm became unpopular with his foreign allies, who began to criticise his autocratic style and religious bias. By the time of his assassination in 1963, he had little support. Australia later sent troops to support South Vietnam in the anti-communist fight, but the bipartisanship evaporated during the mid-1960s as the ALP began to sympathise with North Vietnam and opposition to the Vietnam War grew. The ALP later withdrew support for and refused to accept refugees from South Vietnam after winning office, but on the return of the centre right Liberal-National coalition to power in 1975, Vietnamese refugees were allowed to resettle in Australia in large numbers.

== Background ==
In 1933, the devoutly Catholic Diệm was appointed Interior Minister of Vietnam, serving under Emperor Bảo Đại. However, a few months thereafter he resigned and became a private citizen because the French colonialists would not give Vietnam any meaningful autonomy. During World War II, the Empire of Japan attacked Indochina and wrested control from France, but when they were defeated by the Allies in 1945, a power vacuum was created. The communist-dominated Việt Minh of Hồ Chí Minh fought for Vietnamese independence, while the French attempted to regain control of their colony by creating the French Union-allied State of Vietnam under Bảo Đại. A staunch anti-communist nationalist, Diệm opposed both and attempted to create his own movement, with little success. With both the French and the communists hostile to him, Diệm felt unsafe and went into self-imposed exile in 1950. He spent the next four years in the United States and Europe enlisting support, particularly among Vatican officials and fellow Catholic politicians in America. The success of the effort was helped by the fact that his elder brother Ngô Đình Thục was the leading Catholic cleric in Vietnam and had studied with high-ranking Vatican officials in Rome a few decades earlier.

In 1954, the French lost the Battle of Dien Bien Phu and the Geneva Conference was held to determine the future of French Indochina. The Việt Minh were given control of North Vietnam, while the State of Vietnam controlled the territory south of the 17th parallel. The Geneva agreements, which the State of Vietnam did not sign, called for reunification elections to be held in 1956. Bảo Đại appointed Diệm as his prime minister, hoping that he would be able to attract American aid as the French withdrew from Southeast Asia. Diệm then deposed Bảo Đại in a fraudulent referendum and declared himself president of the newly proclaimed Republic of Vietnam. Diệm received support from the U.S. and other anti-communist countries in the midst of the Cold War. He refused to hold the national elections and asserted that Hồ Chí Minh would rig the ballots in the north, although he had done so himself in deposing Bảo Đại.

== Meetings and ceremonies ==
Diệm arrived in the capital Canberra on 2 September 1957; his visit was the first by a foreign incumbent head of state to Australia. He had visited the US in May, and the visit to Australia was the second of three legs in a tour of anti-communist countries in the Asia–Pacific region; Diệm had visited Thailand in August and went on to South Korea after leaving Australia. The magnitude of the ceremonial welcome accorded to Diệm was unseen since the visit in 1954 by Queen Elizabeth II. According to Peter Edwards, a military historian at the Australian War Memorial specialising in the Vietnam War, "Everywhere he was feted as a man of courage, faith and vision", and he noted that Diệm was received with "more ceremony and pageantry" than the visit of Queen Elizabeth II in 1954.

Diệm travelled with five others, including the Minister for Public Works and Communications, the Health Minister, and the Permanent Secretary-General of the Department for National Defense. Ahead of his arrival, the South Vietnamese leader had specifically asked to visit Australian manufacturing sites in Sydney and Melbourne, particularly those in the food processing, textile, shipbuilding and housing industries.

Upon disembarking from his plane at Canberra Airport on the morning of Monday 2 September, Diệm was photographed for The Age and described as a "small but striking figure in a royal blue silk frock coat, long white trousers and black mandarin hat". He was greeted by the Governor-General of Australia Sir William Slim and the Prime Minister of Australia Robert Menzies, and was also introduced to the British High Commissioner Lord Carrington and United States Ambassador William Sebald. He was given a 21-gun salute and a guard of honour by the Royal Australian Air Force, whose fighter jets flew overhead, before making a speech about bilateral relations. Diệm said thanked Australia for its "unflagging support in our most critical hours" and praised relations as being of "a quality normally only found in countries united by long friendship". He said "From our common love for freedom and our determination to keep it, stem the solidarity and friendship between our two countries." The South Vietnamese leader was then hosted for a dinner reception at Yarralumla, the residence of the Governor-General.

The centrepiece of Diệm's visit was a speech to a joint sitting of the Parliament of Australia on Tuesday, September 3, with both the House of Representatives and the Senate in attendance. President Diệm said that "moral and spiritual rearmament" and the "moral unity" of the people were the key factors in fighting the spread of communism. After the speech, Menzies called for three cheers for Diệm at an official parliamentary luncheon. Doc Evatt, the leader of the opposition Australian Labor Party joined in, proclaiming that peace, stability and democracy had been achieved in South Vietnam. On the same day, Diệm also visited the Australian War Memorial and the Australian National University.

On Wednesday, 4 September, Diệm visited the Royal Military College Duntroon in Canberra, where he watched and addressed a parade of Australian cadets, who were training to become officers. Diệm told the students that they were "comrades of the Free World" and that they would help to defend like-minded countries. At midday, Diệm left the national capital to begin a two-day stint in Melbourne, the capital and largest city in the southern state of Victoria. He was flown to Melbourne Airport by a Royal Australian Air Force Convair and met by a guard of honour formed by members of the Royal Australian Navy. Diệm was met by Premier of Victoria Sir Henry Bolte and Lieutenant-Governor Sir Edmund Herring, and was the guest of honour at a reception hosted by Premier Bolte at Parliament House. On Thursday, 5 September, Diệm attended official receptions at Melbourne Town Hall and at the residence of the Governor of Victoria, re-emphasising his themes of anti-communism and the bilateral focus on democracy. He also visited three factories and had a private audience with the Catholic Archbishop of Melbourne Daniel Mannix, who was well known for his political power and advocacy in Australia. The next morning, before departing for Sydney, Diệm inspected a textile factory in the inner-northern suburb of Carlton and visited several large-scale public housing estates. At the time, Australia was undergoing a post-World War II population boom and was dealing with housing pressures, an issue that was also confronting South Vietnam following the large influx of northern refugees after the partition in 1954.

The guard of honour and a 21-gun salute that Diệm received at Parliament House was repeated in Sydney and Melbourne, where large crowds cheered Diệm's arrival at the airport and the passing of his motorcade. After arriving in Sydney on Friday, September 6, around midday aboard the RAAF Convair, the South Vietnamese leader was taken outside the capital cities for two days during the weekend, so that he could see the Snowy Mountains Scheme, a large hydroelectricity and irrigation project in highland New South Wales. He returned to Sydney on Sunday, September 8, and left Australia the following evening. In one of Diệm's final functions in Sydney, a minor emergency occurred at the Australia Hotel during a banquet hosted by the Premier of New South Wales, Joseph Cahill. A fire ignited in a pile of rubbish, causing alarm bells to sound for ten minutes, interrupting Premier Cahill when he was making his speech, but no evacuation was required.

At the end of the visit, Menzies bestowed on Diệm an honorary Knight Grand Cross of the Order of St Michael and St George, one of the highest imperial honours that had been bestowed on someone who was not a British subject. In his final comments, Diệm said "I have been enriched by this visit to Australia, for I have noted the vast material and spiritual resources of a people who are hard-working, upright, frank, and loyal in their social, political and international relations." He was met by Governor-General Slim, Prime Minister Menzies, the heads of the branches of the Australian Defence Force, the New South Wales Police Commissioner, and given a guard of honour by 100 soldiers before departing on a Qantas Super Constellation requisitioned for his use. Edwards said of the trip: "Australia had now associated Diệm's survival with its national interest, publicly and without restraint", something that eventually extended to military support against the Vietnamese communists.

Diệm spent little time on detailed defence and policy discussions with Australian officials during the trip, because of his extensive meetings with Catholic leaders. Although Diệm had signalled his intentions to discuss defence relations during the visit, these did not materialise. At the end of the visit, Diệm and Menzies released a bilateral statement, announcing that they would increase the magnitude of the Colombo Plan, a program under which Asian students could study abroad in Western nations. However, there was little detail in the announcements relating to anti-communism, with only general expressions of Australian support, including a pledge to increase the amount of non-military aid for the South Vietnamese Civil Guard and civilian aid equipment. Diệm had previously stated that if North Vietnam attacked the south, he would send the Army of the Republic of Vietnam to land in the Red River Delta in the north and retaliate. This was contrary to the air attack plans of the South East Asian Treaty Organization (SEATO), which had vowed to defend the south under the provisions of the Manila Treaty. Despite the public statements of support, the Australian government never shared the details of the SEATO plans with Diệm.

== Media reception and support ==
The Australian media wrote uniformly glowing reports that heaped praise on Diệm, and generally presented him as a courageous, selfless and wise leader. The Sydney Morning Herald described Diệm as "One of the most remarkable men in the new Asia ... authoritarian in approach but liberal in principle". The Age compared Diệm favourably to Chiang Kai-shek and Syngman Rhee, the Presidents of the Republic of China and South Korea respectively. The trio were the respective leaders of the anti-communist halves of the three countries in Asia that had been divided along communist and anti-communist lines. The Age opined that Diệm was not "morally equivocal" but "incorruptible and intensely patriotic" compared to his anti-communist counterparts, and "the type of Asian leader whose straight talk and courageous manner should be valued". The editorial also noted Diệm's strong religious opinions and linked to his strident anti-communism and opposition to neutralism. It further acclaimed him as "incorruptible and patriotic" and that he had restored order to a chaotic country. The Canberra Times noted that Diệm's visit coincided with that of Foreign Minister Richard Casey to Malaya for that country's independence celebrations. Australia had supported Malaya's successful fight against communism and the newspaper compared the two countries, predicting that they would succeed because "the leaders owe their authority to popular support". Like the politicians, the press overlooked the negative aspects and reality of Diệm's rule, such as his authoritarianism. Although Diệm was depicted as being extremely popular and democratic, he had made himself president when his brother rigged a 1955 referendum that allowed him to depose Bảo Đại; Diệm was subsequently credited with 133% of the votes in Saigon. Diệm's family regime routinely engaged in corruption, ballot stuffing and arbitrary arrests of all opposition. The newspapers also failed to mention that the South Vietnamese economy was largely being propped up by the Commercial Import Program run by the United States and that land reform had failed.

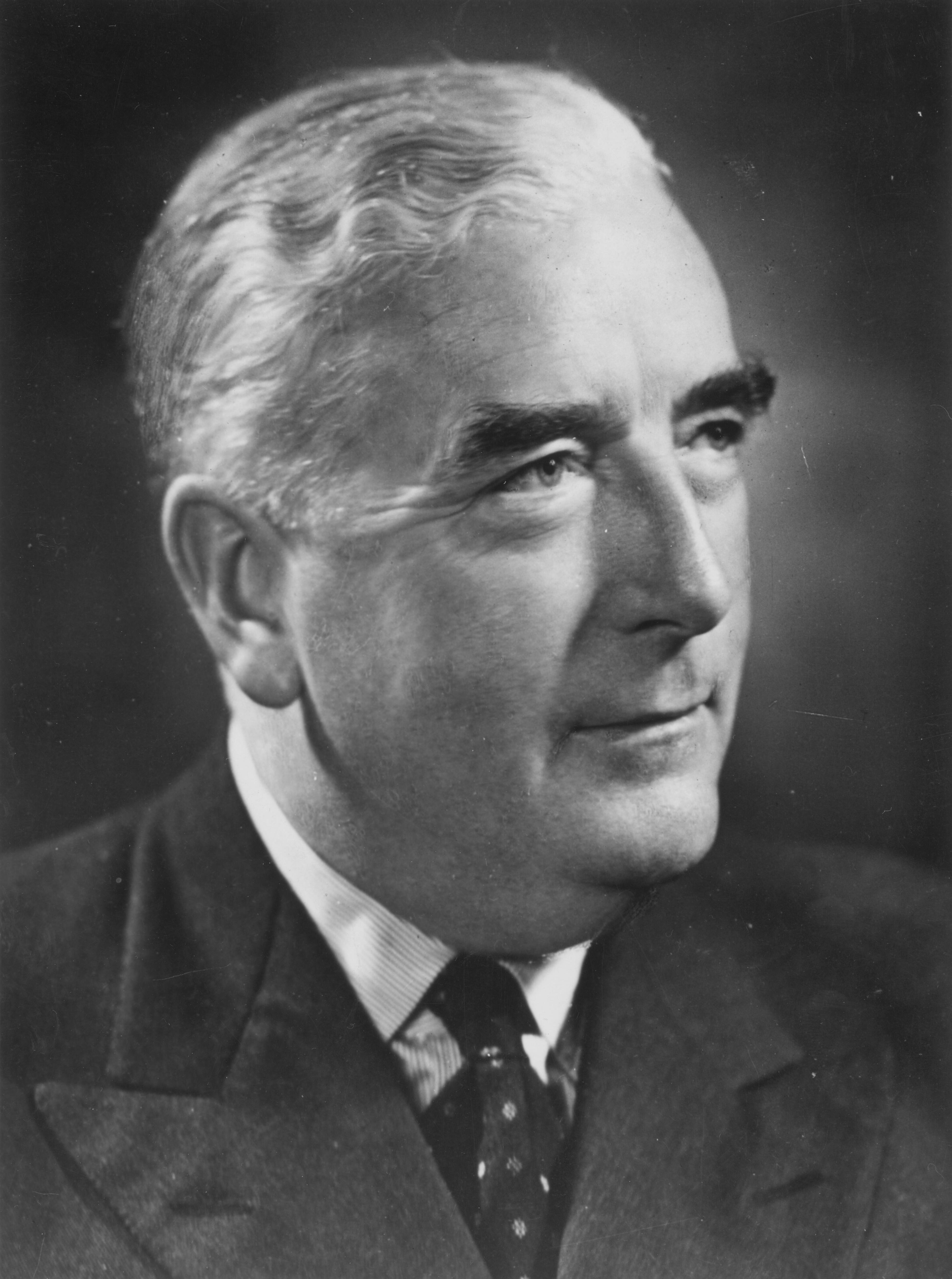
Robert Menzies, Australian Prime Minister for 18 and a half years, cheered and decorated Diệm.

The mainstream media depicted Diệm as a friendly and charismatic leader who related well to the populace. The Herald showed photographs of the president eating cheese, and inspecting the foliage at the Botanic Gardens. Diệm was depicted making friends with a young boy from a Collingwood public housing estate and having tea with South Vietnamese students studying abroad at the University of Melbourne, with the females wearing the traditional áo dài. In contrast, Diệm was generally regarded as aloof and distant from the population, rarely heading outside the presidential palace to mingle with his people, and holding military processions in honour of his ascension to power in front of empty grandstands.

The strongest support for Diệm came from the Australian Catholic media. Diệm was a Catholic in a majority Buddhist country, and he had close religious links with the Vatican, who had helped him rise to power. He had stayed in a seminary run by Cardinal Francis Spellman in the United States in the early 1950s before his elevation to power. Diệm's elder brother Archbishop Ngô Đình Thục was the leading Catholic figure in Vietnam and a classmate of Spellman when the pair studied in Rome. Spellman was widely regarded as the most powerful Catholic figure in the United States and he helped to organise support for Diệm among American politicians, particularly Catholics. In 1957, Diệm dedicated his country to the Virgin Mary and ruled on the basis of a Catholic doctrine known as personalism. His younger brother Ngô Đình Nhu ran the secret and autocratic Catholic Cần Lao Party (Personalist Labor Party), which provided a clandestine network of support and police-state mechanisms to protect Diệm's rule. It counted many leading public servants and military officers among its members. Diệm also maintained land policies that were preferential to the Roman Catholic Church, the largest property owner in the country. Their holdings were exempt from redistribution under land reform schemes, while the construction of Buddhist temples was restricted; military and civil service promotions were given preferentially to Catholics.

The Catholic Weekly described Diệm as "his nation's saviour from Red onslaught ... an ardent patriot of great courage and moral integrity and an able intellectual". The paper also praised Diệm's Catholic links, pointing out that Thục was a former classmate of the current Archbishop of Sydney Norman Thomas Gilroy when they studied at the Vatican.

Diệm's achievements and support for Catholics were particularly praised by Bob Santamaria, the unofficial leader and guiding influence of the Democratic Labor Party (DLP). The DLP had broken away from the Australian Labor Party (ALP), the nation's main centre-left social democratic party. The split occurred in the 1950s during the McCarthyism scares, as the Catholic factions broke away to form the DLP on the basis that the ALP was too lenient towards communists. One of the reasons that Menzies strongly backed Diệm was to gain further favour with the DLP and accentuate the divisions among his left wing opponents.

Diệm's visit prompted increased interest in Vietnam by Australian Catholics, particularly supporters of the DLP. Australian Catholics came to see South Vietnam as an anti-communist and Vatican stronghold in Asia and as a result, became strong supporters of the Vietnam War. Harold Lalor, a Jesuit priest and leading confidant of Santamaria, had studied with Thục in Rome. During the trip, Diệm met with Gilroy, the first Australian cardinal, as well as Santamaria and Archbishop of Melbourne Daniel Mannix, both of whom praised him strongly. Mannix was one of the most powerful men in Australia during the era, and had great political influence.

== Aftermath ==
The positive reception accorded to Diệm in 1957 contrasted with increasingly negative Australian attitudes towards Vietnam. Over time, the media in both Australia and the United States began to pay more attention to Diệm's autocratic style and religious bias, especially after the eruption of the Buddhist crisis in 1963, and the iconic self-immolation of Thích Quảng Đức. After six months of civil unrest, Diệm was deposed and assassinated in November 1963, and by that time, little goodwill remained. With new leadership in Saigon, and an escalation in the war against the communists, Australia sent in ground troops—including conscripts—to support South Vietnam, but over time, the bipartisanship of the 1950s evaporated. The centre-left ALP became more opposed to Australian involvement in the Vietnam War, and Arthur Calwell ― in one of his last acts as Leader of the ALP—stridently denounced South Vietnamese Prime Minister Nguyễn Cao Kỳ as a "fascist dictator" and a "butcher" ahead of his 1967 visit. At the time, Kỳ was the chief of the Republic of Vietnam Air Force and headed a military junta. Despite the controversy leading up to the visit, Kỳ's trip was a success. He dealt with the media effectively, despite hostile sentiment from some sections of the press and public. However, with the war becoming increasing destructive, and the death toll rising, opposition to the Vietnam War grew. In 1970, Labor leader Gough Whitlam posed with the Viet Cong flag, and his deputy Jim Cairns, the chairman of the Vietnam Moratorium Committee, led large anti-war protests. Labor won the 1972 federal election on an anti-war platform, and Whitlam withdrew Australian troops and recognised North Vietnam, which welcomed his electoral success. Whitlam later refused to accept South Vietnamese refugees following the fall of Saigon to the communists in April 1975. The Liberals—led by Malcolm Fraser—condemned Whitlam, and after defeating Labor in December 1975, allowed South Vietnamese refugees to settle in Australia in large numbers.

== See also ==
- Ngô Đình Diệm presidential visit to the United States
