= Hà Long =

- Commune
- Interactive map of Hà Long
- Coordinates: 20.089974901330613°N 105.79671782062617°E
- Country: Vietnam
- Region: North Central Coast
- Province: Thanh Hóa
- Established: 16 June 2025
- Administrative headquarters: Hoàng Yến Hamlet

Area
  - Total: 65.43 km^{2} (25.26 sq mi)

Population (2024)
  - Total: 23,247
  - Density: 355/km^{2} (920/sq mi)
- Postal code: 40623
- Website: halong.thanhhoa.gov.vn

Hà Long is a commune in Thanh Hóa province, Vietnam.

On 16 June 2025, Hà Trung district was dissolved as part of the 2025 Vietnamese administrative reform, which abolished the district-level administrative system. Hà Long Commune was established under Resolution No. 1686/NQ-UBTVQH15 of the Standing Committee of the National Assembly of Vietnam, through the merger of the entire area and population of Hà Long township and Hà Bắc and Hà Giang communes.

Hà Long was originally established as a commune of Hà Trung district on 6 July 1954. On 1 January 2025, it was reorganized as a township of Hà Trung district. Following the dissolution of Hà Trung district on 16 June 2025, Hà Long became a commune directly under Thanh Hóa province.
