= Commercial Import Program =

Economic aid pact between South Vietnam and the United States

The Commercial Import Program, sometimes known as the Commodity Import Program (CIP), was an economic aid arrangement between South Vietnam and its main supporter, the United States. It lasted from January 1955 until the Fall of Saigon in 1975 and the dissolution of South Vietnam following the invasion by North Vietnam after US forces had withdrawn from the country due to the 1973 cease-fire agreement.

The initiative was a trading plan that was designed to inject large amounts of American capital into the South Vietnamese economy to help fuel its industrialization, growth and self-sufficiency, without incurring the high levels of inflation that would normally occur in such a drastic injection of money.

The CIP was a scheme whereby US dollars were given to the South Vietnamese government treasury. Selected businesspeople were given import licenses that allowed them to purchase US dollars with South Vietnamese currency at a rate far below the market value.

The importers then used their American currency to buy US goods, while the Saigon government kept the South Vietnamese currency paid by the businessmen to fund the military and public service. The objective of the mechanism was to inject large amounts of money into the economy in an indirect way, through material goods, so that inflation would be avoided.

However, the initiative failed to generate much economic development, as license holders spent most of their funds on consumer goods.

The main effect of the aid package was a rapid expansion in the urban middle and upper class, while life remained mostly unchanged for South Vietnam's rural majority. This served to increase anti-government resentment among peasants, while solidifying urban support for the Saigon government. US officials were aware of the failure of the program to propel economic development, but did not try and divert the spending to investment as they regarded the solidification of urban support for the government to be very important.

They also used the dependence of the urban class on the CIP to achieve political changes in South Vietnam.

In 1963, when the US sought to pressure the government of Ngo Dinh Diem after the alliance began to falter, they cut off funding as a gesture to the urban civil servant and military officer class that they disapproved of Diem. Following the South Vietnamese leader's overthrow and assassination in a US-backed coup, the CIP resumed.

== History ==
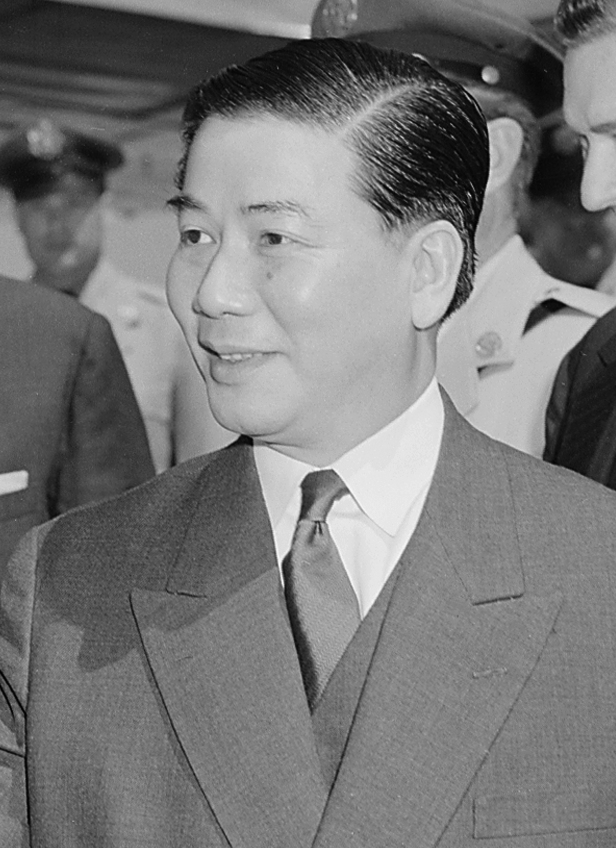
President Ngo Dinh Diem

During World War II, Imperial Japan attacked Indochina and wrested control from France, but when they were defeated by the Allies in 1945, a power vacuum resulted. The communist-dominated Vietminh of Ho Chi Minh fought for Vietnamese independence, while the French attempted to regain control of their colony by creating the French Union-allied State of Vietnam. Up until 1954, the First Indochina War raged. In 1954, the French lost the Battle of Dien Bien Phu and the Geneva Conference was held to determine the future of French Indochina. The Vietminh were given control of North Vietnam, while the State of Vietnam controlled the territory south of the 17th parallel. The Geneva agreements, which the State of Vietnam did not sign, called for reunification elections to be held in 1956. The State of Vietnam received support from the US and other anti-communist countries in the midst of the Cold War, which saw it as a partner in a fight against the spread of communism.

The Commercial Import Program was created in January 1955, immediately upon the transfer of France's remaining direct influence over the State of Vietnam to the chief of state, former Emperor Bảo Đại and his Prime Minister Ngo Dinh Diem. The Americans and Diem feared a communist electoral victory and national polls never took place. In October, Diem proclaimed himself the president of the newly formed Republic of Vietnam after he won a fraudulent referendum, and the aid continued as the US wanted to build a strong and stable anti-communist state in Southeast Asia. When the program was first introduced, it generated turbulence for merchant importers in Vietnam. As a large proportion of the imports up to that point had been from France, traders who were dependent on selling French products found themselves in difficulties as their wares would now be more expensive than those of import license holders who now had access to cheaper American alternatives. The suppliers of French goods threatened to organize a strike, but this never materialized. At the time, South Vietnam was also suffering from a lack of foreign currency reserves and the CIP was seen as an urgent mechanism of remedying this. The introduction of the CIP brought an unprecedented new level of economic liberalism and capitalism, and at first, the entrepreneurial class struggled to meet the challenges of a deregulated market, leading to a series of significant shortages and surpluses of various goods due to their inexperience in judging market forces and resultant imbalances in the economy. Initially 25,000 applications for import licenses were received, many from speculators. In the early years of the initiative, a proportion of the US funding for the CIP came through the proceeds of the sale of surplus American agricultural products to France.

Upon the inception of the program in 1955, around 20,000 CIP licenses were granted, but it was determined that the progress was too unwieldy to manage, so the number of licenses was decreased and people were obliged to assemble into conglomerates to access the scheme. At first, inflation was regarded as such a pressing concern that there were very few limitations on what could be imported, the most notable restrictions being alcohol and jewelry. It was reasoned that more restrictions on imports would cause a lack of supply of goods, causing price increases. However, restrictions were increased in the next three years to an average of 75.

In 1955, Washington pumped USD322.4 million into South Vietnam, and the historian George McTurnan Kahin calculated that 87% of this came through the CIP. From the end of 1955, when Diem took full control of the country after ousting Bảo Đại and declaring himself president, until 1961, the US provided Saigon with USD1.447 billion in aid, mostly through the CIP. In addition, USD95.6 million of loans were given. In 1958 and 1959, the CIP accounted for around 80% of economic assistance. By 1960, Diem had accumulated USD216.4 million in reserves. During the Diem era, around 43% of the CIP revenue went into military spending. The amount of CIP aid peaked at USD398 million in 1966 and began dropping thereafter, reaching USD233 million by 1973.

== Economic method ==
The program used import subsidies to pump US dollars into the South Vietnamese treasury. The regimes sold these dollars to business people who held licenses to import American goods. The businessmen bought the US dollars from the Saigon treasury with their South Vietnamese piasters at half the official exchange rate; they then used this cheaply acquired American currency to import US goods. This meant that American manufacturers would still get the same amount of US currency they would have received for selling their goods on the free market, while South Vietnamese importers could get twice as much goods for the same money. The piasters that the Saigon government collected from selling the US aid dollars were to be placed in a fund held by the National Bank of Vietnam, which was to be used to fund the expansion and training of the Army of the Republic of Vietnam, national police and civil service.

During the rule of Diem, the majority of the cost of military, police and public service was paid by the US through the CIP. As the extra money was not actually circulating in the South Vietnamese economy and competing for the same supply of goods and services, inflation was not stimulated. A similar fiscal device was employed in the Marshall Plan aid package for the rebuilding of Western Europe following the destruction caused during World War II. One American economist described the CIP as the "greatest invention since the wheel".

== Operation ==
Although the plan was theoretically sound, it was ineffective in stimulating economic growth. During Diem's time, there was little meaningful economic investment or development of infrastructure. The businessmen mostly used the import subsidies to purchase consumer goods such as boats, motorbikes, refrigerators, radios, music systems and other similar goods, which were luxuries at the time. The program was thus effective in expanding the size of the urban middle class, but it did not generate much economic investment. In 1957, it was estimated that at least 75% of the good imported were consumer goods or materials used to produce them. Only a minority of the purchases were of capital goods such as manufacturing equipment and supplies for factory production. As a result, not much of the subsidies created more economic production. In 1959, the amount of clothing imported (24 million USD) was only marginally lower than the amount of machinery imported (28 million USD). The government funds generated from selling importing licenses also became a problem, with corruption and explicit theft dogging its effectiveness as a means of bankrolling the military and civil service. In addition, some government officials would not sell the coveted licenses to the businessmen until a bribe was paid. Another criticism of the CIP was that the funds collected by the government were not used for any significant amount of government-sector economic investment but mainly to fund the army. Diem defended this by stating that national security was paramount.

In time, the ineffectiveness of the CIP began to concern the Eisenhower administration, who were worried about the lack of industrialization. The corruption that permeated the initiative remained a problem. The rural peasants of Vietnam, who comprised more than 80% of the population, were unaffected by the aid package except for the resentment that it instilled in them when they observed the relative affluence of their city counterparts compared to their own impoverished state. It was estimated that 1961 that unemployment was running at 25% and that private investment in the economy was less than 10%. However, the program was credited with transforming the textile industry, as 25,000 sewing machines were imported in the first year of its operation.

Phan Quang Dan, an anti-communist opposition politician who was Diem's most prominent opponent, and one of only two dissidents to win a seat at the 1959 legislative election but was imprisoned by Diem and barred from taking up his position, said that "The U.S. Commercial Import Program—which costs us nothing—brings in on a massive scale luxury goods of all kinds, which give us an artificial society—enhanced material conditions that don't amount to anything, and no sacrifice; it brings luxury to our ruling group and middle class, and luxury means corruption."

One of the political impacts of the massive infusion into the South Vietnamese economy was to expand the urban middle-class and ease the pressure on the government to collect taxes. This was because the government had set high import duties, which were effectively 50% of the cut-price exchange rate used under the CIP; these funds were also part of normal revenue, and were not subject to American oversight, unlike the proceeds of the counterpart fund. As a result of the proceeds of the import duty, income tax was very low, and without the progressive income tax rate in most countries, the upper-class were not affected by taxation as much as their peers in other nations, and thus supported Diem strongly. The effective income taxation rate was no more than 5%, and the South Vietnamese president privately told an adviser from the Michigan State University Group that he was happy that the CIP had allowed him to build a large support base among the newly created middle and upper class. American economic aid administrators were also aware of the effects of the CIP on urban political support for Diem and his successors. They were aware that the CIP had not been yielding substantial gains in economic development, and noted this in their reports, but said that the program should be continued regardless, as it was effective in enriching the urban middle class and ensuring their political support, thereby gaining loyalty from military officers, business leaders and public servants. A 1959 report concluded that if the CIP was absent or diluted to equilibrium economic levels, the resulting fall in living standards would create "serious political problems" due to erosion of the government's support among the urban minority.

As the CIP allowed licensees to import goods at half price, it was regarded as a virtual guarantee of business success, regardless of entrepreneurial skill. As a result, the licenses were highly prized. For those who were not confident in their sales ability, a healthy profit was usually made by selling their license to other willing businessmen, especially as demand far outstripped supply. A 1966 US Government report concluded that it was possible to guarantee a 100% domestic profit on piasters, and that a 50% profit could be safely achieved by using black market exchange rates and depositing one's money in an American bank. Officials also levied another 18 piasters per dollar on customs duties on goods imported into the country.

Despite its shorter term political benefits, the South Vietnamese government also had complaints about the way the Americans set up the CIP. Diem and Nhu claimed that the paperwork involved in the applications for imports made the process was too slow and hindered the development of an emerging economy where the market situation changed rapidly. In particular, any investment in capital goods by importers that cost more than USD500,000 needed a formal American review before approval. Nhu also publicly criticized the review policy on several occasions, citing several private infrastructure investments that were blocked by American administrators. Nhu and Diem felt that the regulations that the Americans put on the use of the piaster fund obtained from Vietnamese importers were stifling their ability to accelerate development, especially as the planning and approval reviews took a long time.

Despite the fact the CIP had the effect of building an urban middle class base for his regime through the proliferation of consumer goods, Diem was unhappy with the situation, fearing the long-term detrimental effects that the lack of investment in capital goods would have on his country. He was particularly opposed to the clause in the importation regulations that restricted the purchase of capital goods to businesses that were entirely private. This proved to be a large hindrance in several areas, as the South Vietnamese government had a policy of having majority ownership of any industry deemed to be of vital national importance, as well as banning foreigners from having a stake in such ventures. South Vietnam's Ambassador to the US, Tran Van Chuong protested to the Americans about this clause, without success. Chuong wrote that the American restriction on the importation of capital goods "perpetuates dependence on this aid", and that "American aid would be most valuable if it were partly devoted to promoting [the] country's industrial capacities".

Over time, the economists in the Eisenhower administration became frustrated with Diem's refusal to devaluate the piaster once the Republic of Vietnam had become a stable nation. Diem refused to make the CIP exchange rate equivalent to the free market exchange rate for the two currencies. Although the fixed exchange rate meant that Americans were heavily funding the South Vietnamese economy and that the importing firms could obtain more goods for their money, the rate also meant that South Vietnam goods would not be economically competitive on the export market. Diem was reluctant to cut the currency rate, which was fixed at 35 piasters to the US dollar, arguing that it would diminish the value of US aid to South Vietnam and undermine the urban middle class support for his regime as they would resent the loss of their cheap consumer and luxury goods. During a meeting in Washington during his state visit in 1957, Diem told Secretary of State John Foster Dulles and Ambassador Elbridge Durbrow that devaluation would set off panic, and that such a move was not possible in a country with low production such as Vietnam. In 1963, the US Ambassador Frederick Nolting and his economic advisers exhorted Diem to spend more of the CIP funds on rural development in an attempt to shore up peasant support in the face of increasing communist pressure, but were rebuffed.

On October 5, 1963, the CIP was briefly suspended by the United States in the wake of the McNamara Taylor mission, a fact-finding expedition to South Vietnam conducted by Secretary of Defense Robert McNamara and Chairman of the Joint Chiefs of Staff General Maxwell D. Taylor to investigate the progress of the fight against the communist Vietcong insurgency. The report concluded that Diem was not concentrating on fighting the insurrection but was instead preoccupied with quelling Buddhist protests for religious equality, such as raiding pagodas and firing on Buddhist dissidents. One of the reasons for the CIP suspension was to give military officers a signal that Washington was unhappy with Diem and therefore increase the prospects of a coup, as well as to try and foster urban resentment towards Diem among those that had previously benefited from the CIP. Another was that Diem might change his policy direction in accordance with US wishes, although they considered this to be unlikely. Funding was restored in early November 1963, about a month later, after the deposal and assassination of Diem in a military coup.

The CIP continued until the dissolution of South Vietnam in April 1975 when the communists overran South Vietnam following the withdrawal of US forces following the 1973 cease-fire agreement. Kahin said that "together with other elements of U.S. economic support...substantially expanded South Vietnam's middle class and helped purchase its political loyalty to both the Saigon regime and its American sponsor" and that it "provided the means for a way of life that was as artificial as the economy upon which it rested". Kahin said that the initiative had the opposite effect of its stated aims, in that it promoted increasing economic dependency.

== See also ==
- Economy of the Republic of Vietnam
- United States–Vietnam relations
