= State visit by Ngo Dinh Diem to the United States =

1957 visit by the South Vietnamese President

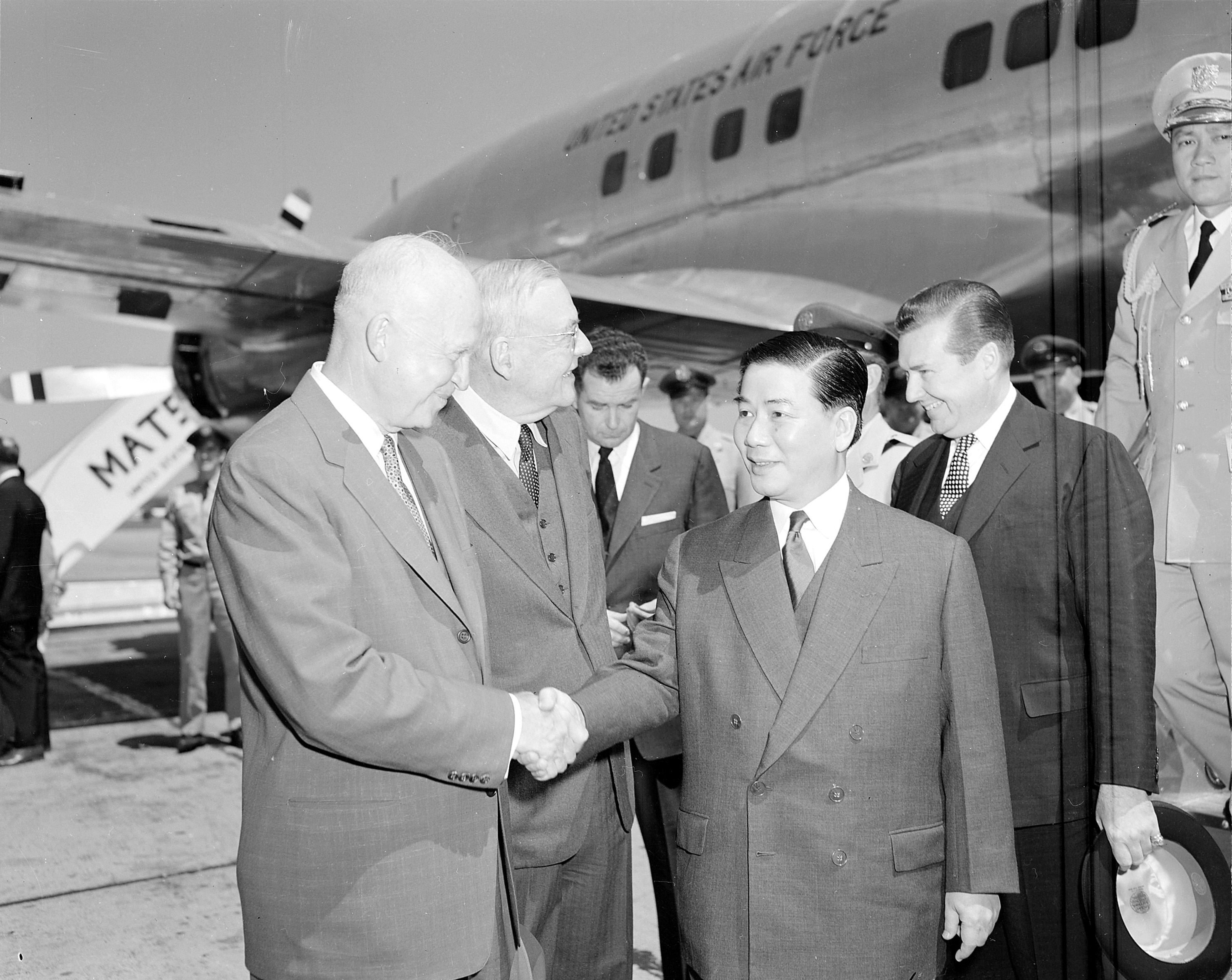
U.S. President Dwight D. Eisenhower and Secretary of State John Foster Dulles greet South Vietnamese President Ngô Đình Diệm at Washington National Airport.

Ngô Đình Diệm, the president of South Vietnam, made a state visit to the United States, the main ally of his government, in 1957. Diệm received a glowing welcome and was heaped with praise as a leader of a "free country" in the midst of the Cold War. The receptions during the visit were in large part organized by the American Friends of Vietnam (AFV), a lobby group dedicated to resolute US support of South Vietnam and which included many politicians from both major parties. The visit was mainly celebratory and ceremonial, rather than being a policy or planning mission. It was part of a year of travelling for Diệm, as he made a visit to Australia in September, as well as to fellow anti-communist countries South Korea and Thailand.

Prior to the visit, the US government and the AFV made thorough preparations to make Diệm's visit pleasant, and the AFV successfully lobbied the media to write favourable reports on the South Vietnamese leader. Diệm was trumpeted as a champion of democracy, and mentions of his autocratic style and election rigging were avoided. Diệm arrived by plane in Washington, D.C., on May 8, and was personally greeted at the airport by President Dwight D. Eisenhower—an honor Eisenhower accorded to only one other visiting head of state. Diệm's motorcade was greeted by 50,000 wellwishers and his address to the US Congress and his policies were heartily endorsed by both sides of politics. During his time in the US capital, Diệm also attended receptions, and had private meetings with both Eisenhower and the US Secretary of State, John Foster Dulles, to discuss American support for South Vietnam, although the meeting with Dulles was ineffectual as Diệm spoke continuously, rendering two-way discussions impossible.

Diệm then visited New York City, where he was given a ticker tape parade through Manhattan, which was attended by 250,000. He was presented with several honors by the city council and given a civic reception, before attending several functions with business leaders, marketing his country as a favorable location for foreign investment. The South Vietnamese president also made stops at the city's main Roman Catholic institution, St Patrick's Cathedral—a Catholic, Diệm had been helped to power by the lobbying of Cardinal Francis Spellman and American Catholic politicians. He also returned to Maryknoll Seminary in Ossining, New York, where he had stayed while in exile, and to the Catholic Seton Hall University to receive an honorary doctorate. Diệm later received an honorary degree from Michigan State University, where he had stayed in exile earlier in the decade and the day was dedicated in his honor. The South Vietnamese president then traveled westwards across to the Pacific coast before returning to Vietnam.

The visit was the high point of relations between Diệm and Washington, as in later years, the US government and members of the AFV became increasingly disillusioned with Diệm's failure to liberalize his government and enact changes to make South Vietnam more democratic. The once-supportive media began to report on South Vietnam without overlooking problems in Diệm's administration. In 1963, American support for Diệm collapsed during the Buddhist crisis as Washington concluded that Diệm was incapable of offering a solid alternative to the communists, and he was overthrown in a US-backed military coup and executed after being captured.

== Background ==
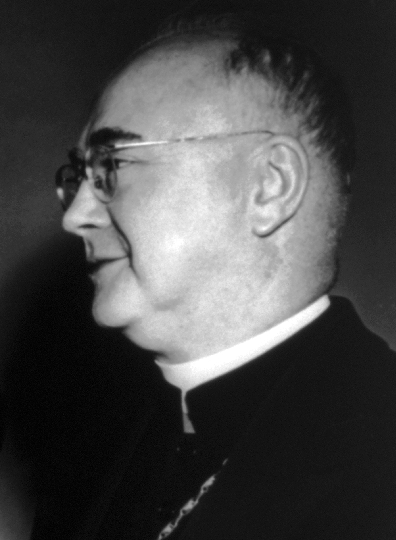
Cardinal Francis Spellman (pictured) organized political support for Diệm among Catholics and Americans.

In 1933, Diệm had been the Interior Minister of Vietnam, serving under Emperor Bảo Đại. However, he resigned after a few months because the French colonial authorities would not give Vietnam any meaningful autonomy, and became a private citizen for the next decade. During World War II, Imperial Japan attacked Indochina and wrested control from France, but when they were defeated by the Allies in 1945, a power vacuum emerged. The communist-dominated Viet Minh of Ho Chi Minh proclaimed the Democratic Republic of Vietnam and fought for independence, while the French attempted to regain control of their colony, and created the State of Vietnam under Bảo Đại, which was an associated free state within the French Union. A staunch anti-communist nationalist, Diệm opposed both and attempted to create his own movement, with little success. With both the French and the communists hostile to him, Diệm felt unsafe and went into self-imposed exile in 1950, leaving Vietnam for the first time in his life. He did so as the communists had sentenced him to death in absentia, while the French refused to give him protection, claiming that they had no resources. Diệm spent most of the next four years in the United States and Europe enlisting support, particularly among fellow Catholic politicians in America and Vatican officials. Diệm's success with the latter group was helped by the fact that his elder brother Ngô Đình Thục was the leading Catholic cleric in Vietnam and had studied with high-ranking priests in Rome.

Diệm had a chance meeting with Wesley Fishel, a political science professor from America during a stopover in Japan. A proponent of the "third force" ideology that opposed communism and colonialism, Fishel quickly befriended Diệm. The American academic organized contacts for Diệm in the US, and he was given an audience with the Acting US Secretary of State James Webb. Diệm made little impression in the first meeting, but continued to meet with lower ranking officials. Thuc introduced his younger brother to Cardinal Francis Spellman, the most politically powerful priest of his time and former classmate of Thuc. Later, Diệm was given a meeting with Pope Pius XII. In early 1951, Diệm was given an audience with US Secretary of State Dean Acheson. The success of his presentation to Acheson prompted Diệm to stay in the US to campaign, basing himself at Spellman's seminary in New Jersey. Diệm travelled across the nation, speaking at universities, and he was given a faculty position at Fishel's institution, the Michigan State University. Diệm then gained the support of US Supreme Court Justice William O. Douglas and Senators John McCormack, Mike Mansfield and John F. Kennedy. McCormack later became the Senate Majority Leader, while Mansfield—a Democrat from Montana—had been a professor of Asian history before entering politics; as a result his opinions about Vietnam were more influential and held in high regard by his fellow senators.

In 1954, the French lost the Battle of Dien Bien Phu and the Geneva Conference was held to determine the future of Indochina. The Viet Minh were given control of North Vietnam, while the State of Vietnam controlled the territory south of the 17th parallel. The Geneva agreements, which the State of Vietnam did not sign, called for reunification elections to be held in 1956. Bảo Đại appointed Diệm as his Prime Minister, hoping Diệm would be able to attract American aid as the French withdrew from Southeast Asia. Diệm returned to Vietnam in June 1954 and took up the post on July 7, 1954. After a series of disagreements, Diệm deposed Bảo Đại in a fraudulent referendum on October 23, 1955, and declared himself president of the newly-proclaimed Republic of Vietnam three days later. Diệm received support from the US and other anti-communist countries in the midst of the Cold War. He refused to hold national reunification elections scheduled in 1956, and asserted that Ho would rig the ballots in the north, although he had done so himself in deposing Bảo Đại. In the meantime, Diệm continued to consolidate his rule and stabilize his new nation.

== Preparation ==
Diệm's trip came after two years of American attempts to schedule a state visit. In 1955, Washington made two attempts to organise a trip while Diệm was still prime minister, but he was too busy quelling opposition groups and his grip on power was tenuous. Diệm addressed these issues by crushing the Bình Xuyên organised crime syndicate in the Battle of Saigon in May 1955, and then deposed Bảo Đại and proclaimed the Republic of Vietnam after his brother Ngô Đình Nhu rigged a referendum that made him head of state. Diệm was credited with 98.2% of the votes cast, with a 133% margin of victory in the capital of Saigon. The South Vietnamese leader's visit was organized after he indicated interest in February 1957 to US Ambassador to South Vietnam G. Frederick Reinhardt.

The Eisenhower administration prepared for Diệm's arrival in great detail. A memorandum from the Office of Protocol (OP) of the State Department gave its personnel detailed information on ceremonial intricacies, such as the correct pronunciation of Diệm's name. It went further in briefing staff on the toasting procedure. The OP printed and distributed a manual detailing Diệm's personal traits and idiosyncrasies. It said the South Vietnamese president was "an introverted, lonely figure ... He is, however, a man with an almost messianic sense of mission". In 1963, Diệm held a military parade in honour of his ascension to power in front of empty grandstands, barring the public. The OP warned that Diệm could be "both intransigent and almost brutal in pursuing and applying policies he has decided upon, and ... has a violent temper."

In contrast to public announcements describing Diệm as a freedom-loving democrat, the manual also explained his authoritarian attitude, as exhibited by his ability to formulate legislation by decree and the police state mechanisms run by Nhu's Cần Lao Party; in 1955, Nhu's agents had beaten those who voted for Bảo Đại instead of Diệm. The manual said that "Vietnam in its present situation and given its own heritage is not yet ready for a democratic government as it is known in the West. The interplay of all shades of opinion in the policy-making process is considered a luxury Vietnam cannot yet afford." It advised public servants to shun any mention of Diệm's autocracy and the fact that he regularly killed or jailed dissidents, noting that "He is most sensitive to such charges."

=== Media campaign ===
In the lead-up to the visit, the American Friends of Vietnam (AFV) engaged in a promotional campaign encouraging newspapers to cover Diệm's visit and imploring them to give the South Vietnamese leader favourable coverage. The AFV also drafted many of Diệm's speeches, making sure that analogies were made between South Vietnam and various events in American history, so that he would make a good impression on the American public and decision-makers. For this purpose they employed the services of the political consultancy firm Harold Oram.

The media prepared for Diệm's arrival by writing about and praising him in great detail. The Washington Post devoted four pages to its profile of Diệm and titled it "Diệm—Symbol of Free New Asia." The Washington Evening Star ran the headline "Welcome to a Champion" and described Diệm as "a valiant and effective fighter against communism." The New York Times praised the visiting president for "advancing the cause of freedom and democracy in Asia" and The Boston Globe dubbed him "Vietnam's Man of Iron." Various papers favourably commented on Diệm's overt opposition to communism, juxtaposing it to the position of non-aligned Asian leaders such as Jawaharlal Nehru of India and Sukarno of Indonesia. Nehru and Sukarno attempted to steer clear of both the US-led anti-communist world and the Soviet bloc, and sought to recruit other countries into their movement. The newspapers compared South Vietnam to a beacon of light in a dark sea of communism.

== Visit ==
Diệm arrived at noon on May 8 at the National Airport in Washington, D.C., aboard the plane of U.S. President Dwight D. Eisenhower, the Columbine III, a silver Constellation. Eisenhower, Secretary of State John Foster Dulles, and Chairman of the Joint Chiefs of Staff Nathan Twining personally received him at the airport; it was only the second time in Eisenhower's presidency that he had personally gone to the airport to greet a visiting head of state. Diệm was then given a 21-gun salute and driven by limousine to his residence. A crowd estimated at more than 50,000 lined the route taken by the South Vietnamese leader's motorcade. On the day of his arrival, The New York Times editorialized that "President Diệm ... is a substantial partner in a going enterprise on behalf of free men in his country and in ours. We honor him and make him doubly welcome on that account." Attempting to put a positive spin on Diệm's lack of emotion towards the crowd, Andrew Tully of The Washington Daily News informed his readers that the president's "air of modest solemnity was far more impressive than any grinning, arm-waving performance could have been." Diệm's failure to respond to the greetings of the masses was not new; when he returned to Vietnam from exile to become prime minister in 1954, he did not bother to wave to well-wishers at Tan Son Nhut Airport.

=== Washington D. C. ===
The next day, Diệm addressed a joint sitting of the United States Congress, with both the House of Representatives and the Senate in attendance. He thanked the US for its ongoing support, particularly when his government had been in a perilous state in 1954 and 1955, and went on to explain his political platform:

We affirm that the sole legitimate object of the state is to protect the fundamental rights of human beings to existence, to the free development of his [sic] intellectual, moral, and spiritual life. ... We affirm that democracy is neither material happiness nor the supremacy of numbers. Democracy is essentially a permanent effort to find the right political means in order to assure to all citizens the right of free development and the maximum initiative, responsibility, and spiritual life.

Diệm also thanked the Americans for "the efforts being made to safeguard liberal democracy" as part of Washington's foreign policy. He compared the million-strong exodus of refugees from communist North Vietnam into the South to that of the Pilgrims who had left the British Isles aboard the Mayflower and sailed to Massachusetts to escape religious persecution. AFV advisers had inserted the Pilgrims reference into the speech, as the flight of the North Vietnamese refugees had received a great deal of attention in the US due to the statements of Catholic activists. Diệm received a standing ovation and his speech was persistently interrupted by loud applause by legislators. Despite his assertion that the weight of numbers was not the measure of democracy, the American media widely praised his attitude to democracy.

Both major parties lavished Diệm with praise. Senator Mansfield said, "The chief credit for holding back the communist aggression not only in Vietnam, but, because of that, in Southeast Asia as well, lies in the determination, the courage, the incorruptibility, and the integrity of President Diệm, who has shown such great ability and has accomplished so much against tremendous odds." Mansfield's praise was given more weight than that of other senators because of his academic qualifications before entering politics. Senator Jacob Javits, a Republican from New York, dubbed Diệm "one of the real heroes of the free world."

President Eisenhower said, "President Ngô Đình Diệm stands for the highest qualities of heroism and statesmanship ... The president of Vietnam, by his inspiring leadership, is opening up vast new areas for the peaceful progress of mankind." In a nationally-televised speech, Secretary of State Dulles said, "I am very much impressed by Prime Minister Diệm. He is a true patriot and dedicated to independence," referring to his defeat of the Bình Xuyên in the 1955 Battle for Saigon. The Assistant Secretary of State for Far Eastern Affairs Walter Robertson said, "Asia has given us in President Diệm another great figure, and the entire Free World has become the richer for his example of determination and moral fortitude."

At the time the Commercial Import Program (CIP) appeared to be working successfully and North Vietnam had not decided to attack the South after Diệm had canceled the planned 1956 reunification elections. The glowing press coverage of the period contrasted to that of the 1960s and 1970s, in which the American media engaged in investigative journalism that undermined the official line presented by Washington in relation to Vietnam, particularly during Diệm's downfall in 1963. Journalists such as David Halberstam, Malcolm Browne, and Neil Sheehan all won Pulitzer Prizes for their work on the Buddhist crisis, in which mass protests erupted after years of discrimination against the Buddhist majority.

On his third day in Washington, Diệm was the keynote speaker and guest at a National Press Club lunch. He attacked Asian leaders who advocated neutralism, saying that "Since communism is not neutral, we cannot be neutral." This impressed the media, who prominently noted Diệm's unequivocal stance in their reports. The Pulitzer Prize-winning Marguerite Higgins of the New York Herald Tribune said that "it is a refreshing—almost startling—experience to hear this Asian hero assert forthrightly: 'communism isn't neutral, therefore we cannot be neutral.' ... He made himself unique among recent Asian visitors ... by the decisiveness with which he publicly chose up sides with the United States and against the communists." In her article, Higgins again criticized the stances of Nehru and Sukarno. Such was the impact of Diệm's soundbite that the AFV thereafter used it as a headline quote in their mailouts and campaigns.

Diệm went on to answer a question about his religious convictions by declaring his adherence to Catholicism and saying, "I have always found the principles of my religion a great inspiration, and, if I have achieved anything in my political career, I owe it all to those principles." His comments were widely trumpeted in Catholic newspapers, which cited them as the reason why he was able to stop a communist takeover of South Vietnam.

The visit was largely ceremonial and mainly focused on mutual praise rather than specific policy planning and negotiations. Diệm stayed in the capital for four days, meeting with Eisenhower and high-ranking members of the State Department on the last of these days. However, the meeting with Dulles turned into a farce after the Secretary of State and his subordinates decided to visit Diệm at Blair House. Diệm, notorious for monologues that often lasted for up to six hours, talked endlessly, and as a result the American diplomats were unable to raise whatever issues they had wanted to discuss.

During the meeting with Eisenhower, Diệm asked about the American commitment towards the defense of South Vietnam. At the time, communist guerrillas had begun a low-level campaign against Diệm in an attempt to reunify Vietnam under their rule, and in response he launched a widespread campaign to crush the communist remnants. Diệm felt that the cloud cover over Indochina would make it difficult for air bombings against communist guerrillas to be effective. He predicted that the communists would try to enter South Vietnam through Laos, which turned out to be the case when the Ho Chi Minh trail came into full usage. Diệm asked the US for a guarantee of continuing aid; at the time, two-thirds of South Vietnam's budget came from the CIP, which was mainly abused by the urban elite to buy consumer goods. Diệm knew that the Eisenhower administration and Congress wanted to make budget savings and implored them to refrain from cutting the CIP expenditure, fearing a deterioration in the Vietnamese economy. Eisenhower said that Vietnamese security was ensured by the South East Asian Treaty Organization, but Diệm remained anxious, believing that the other member states were too weak and lacking in resources to stand by their pledges to defend his country. Upon Diệm's departure from the capital, the White House released a statement praising "the remarkable achievements of the Republic of Viet-Nam under his leadership."

=== New York City ===
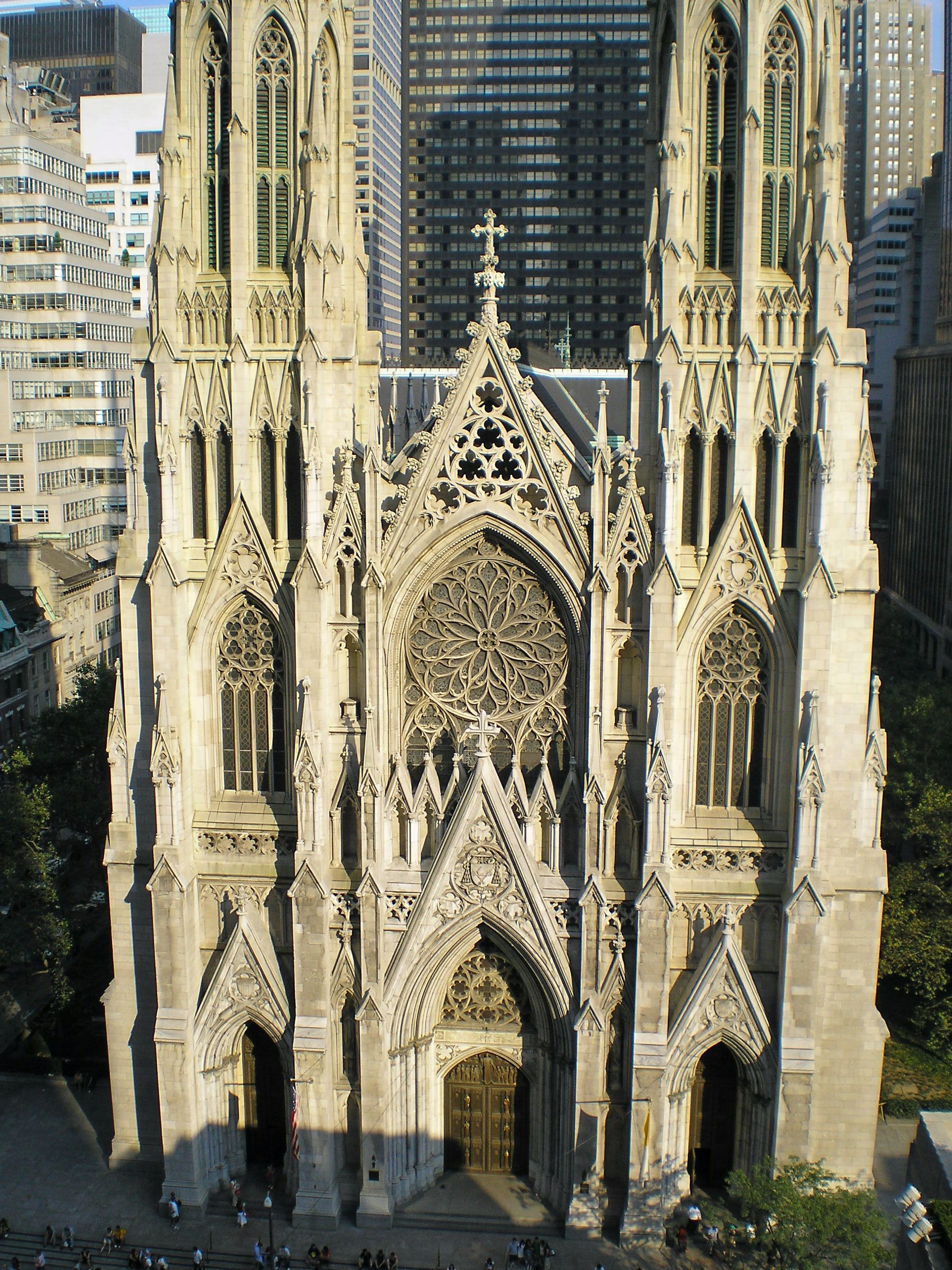
Diệm visited St. Patrick's Cathedral in New York City.

After leaving Washington, Diệm traveled to New York City, disembarking from the Columbine III at LaGuardia Airport. New York had a large Irish Catholic population, and Diệm received an even greater reception than in the capital. He was taken in a seven-car motorcade to St. Patrick's Cathedral, where Bishop Joseph Flannelly delayed the mass to await the South Vietnamese president. After leading Diệm to a point of honor in the cathedral's sanctuary, Bishop Flannelly said "We are delighted and we are proud to have ... His Excellency Ngô Đình Diệm. The whole world acclaimed him when this God-fearing anti-communist and courageous statesman saved Vietnam! ... [Y]our fellow Catholics join our hearts and souls with you at this altar of God."

Diệm then visited the Maryknoll Seminary. In the early 1950s, when his political fortunes were at a low ebb, he had gone into self-imposed exile and stayed there for a period, engaging in religious practice and building up his political contacts among Catholics, most notably Cardinal Spellman. Diệm was given a strongly supportive reception by the seminarians. He then went to South Orange, New Jersey, where he was conferred with an honorary law degree from the Catholic Seton Hall University, on the grounds that he, "more than anyone else, stopped the communists in their hour of partial conquest of Vietnam." Diệm had stayed at Seton Hall during his period in exile and claimed partial credit for the creation of an Oriental Studies Department at the university. He said that the new department would "help to salvage what must be salvaged of the values of Asia in the tornado that befell this large portion of the world."

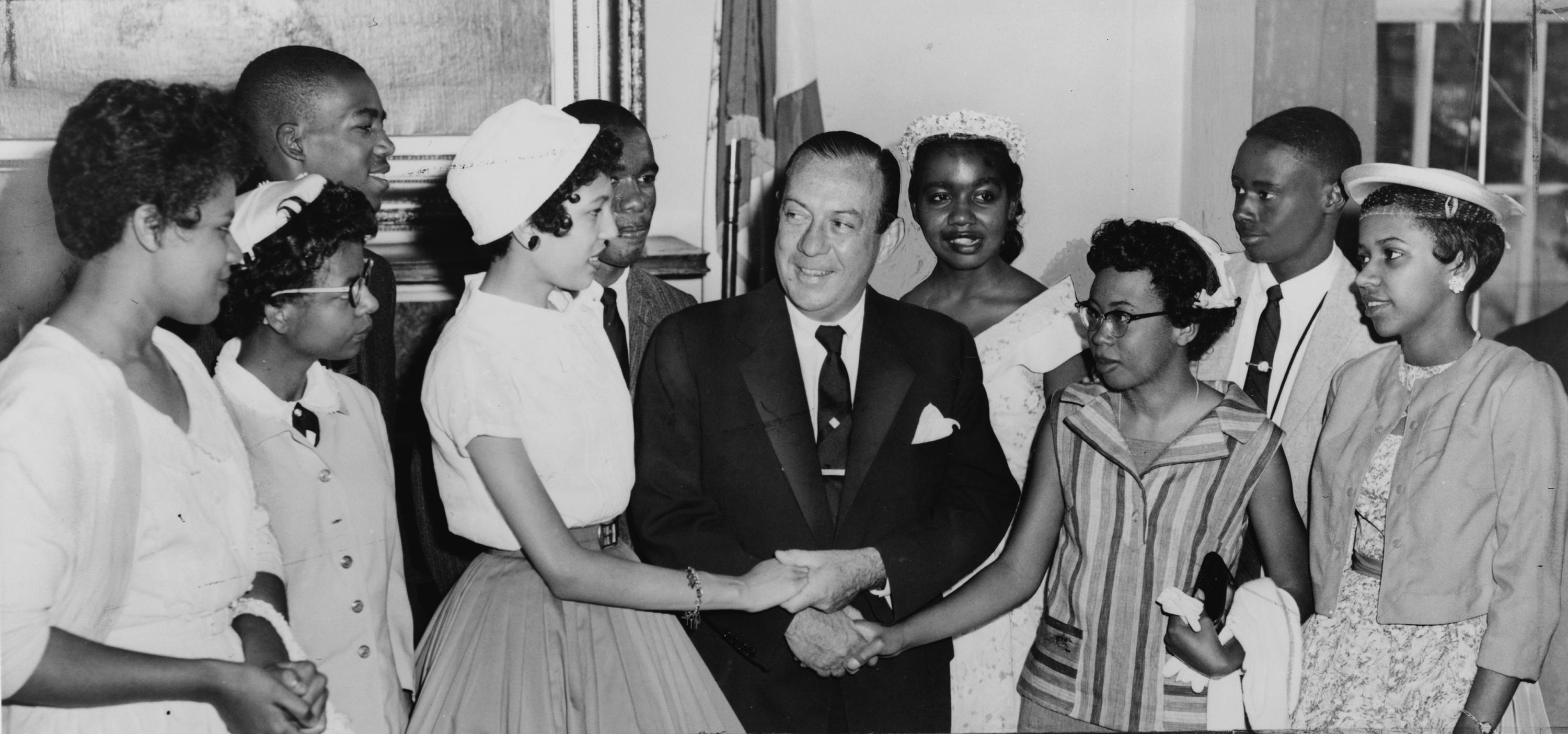
Diệm was given a civic reception and tickertape parade, and awarded a Medal of Honor by New York Mayor Robert Wagner (center).

The next day, Diệm was given a ticker tape parade from Lower Broadway to City Hall and a reception by Mayor Robert Wagner. Around 250,000 people cheered him during the parade. Wagner called Diệm "a man to whom freedom is the very breath of life," referred to the Republic of Vietnam as a "political miracle," and said that "the principal credit ... should go to President Ngô Đình Diệm, a man history may yet adjudge as one of the great figures of the twentieth century." Diệm was bestowed with the city's Medal of Honor and a scroll for "Distinguished and Exceptional Service." In turn, Diệm praised New York City at a lunch hosted by Wagner in his honor, stating it had successfully integrating large numbers of immigrants of different backgrounds, and describing the city as a symbol of "human brotherhood." Again on the advice of AFV consultants, he compared this to recent events in Vietnam.

Diệm then met the Council on Foreign Relations, where he promoted Vietnamese business interests and touted his country as an ideal place for foreign investment. He described the Vietnamese people as industrious workers who focused on developing farmland rather than building monuments and palaces. Diệm was given a dinner in his honor at the Ambassador Hotel organized by the AFV and the International Rescue Committee (IRC). The AFV had been formed by Joseph Buttinger, an IRC member who had worked in Saigon in assisting with Operation Passage to Freedom, the mass evacuation of North Vietnamese refugees to the south after the partition of Vietnam in 1954.

Diệm was given an award commemorating Richard Byrd, a polar explorer who previously served as the honorary chairman of the IRC's board of directors. The master of ceremonies was Henry Luce, the boss of Time magazine, which had been a fervent backer of Diệm. Spellman delivered the speech and the dignitaries included Senators Mansfield and Kennedy, John D. Rockefeller Jr., Eleanor Roosevelt, and William Randolph Hearst Jr. Diệm thanked America generally and Luce and his media operations in particular for its support of Vietnam. The dinner was also attended by IRC chairman Leo Cherne, who read a telegram from Eisenhower, extolling Diệm for exhibiting "the highest qualities of heroism and statesmanship." The day after, Diệm attended mass with Spellman and was the guest of honor at a business lunch hosted by the Far East-America Council of Commerce and Industry at the Waldorf Astoria. Diệm promoted South Vietnam as a business opportunity for American entrepreneurs, saying that the populace was pro-American, unlike other countries, and that they welcomed foreign investment.

=== Closing stages ===
Diệm then left New York City and traveled to Michigan State University, where he had stayed during a self-imposed exile in the early 1950s. Fishel worked at the university and helped Diệm secure a position there. On May 15, the South Vietnamese leader gave a speech to 4,000 people and received an honorary degree; Governor G. Mennen Williams decreed that day to be "Ngô Đình Diệm Day". Diệm then visited Tennessee before stopping at Los Angeles for a banquet hosted by the Los Angeles World Affairs Council.

Diệm left the mainland on May 19, and his final stop was in Hawaii, where he was a guest of Admiral Felix Stump, the commander of United States Pacific Fleet. The reason for the visit was to discuss Diệm's concerns over America's reaction if South Vietnam came under communist attack. Stump reiterated Washington's opinions that nuclear weapons would be used to defend any anti-communist country that was attacked by communists, in accordance with public statements made by Eisenhower and Dulles. He said the Americans would do so by dropping nuclear weapons on communist China.

== Aftermath ==
The visit to the US was the high point in Diệm's relations with his primary sponsor. The Americans began to place increasing pressure on Diệm to carry out democratic reforms and liberalize the political system, particularly during the ambassadorship of Elbridge Durbrow. Diệm, however, resisted the calls to broaden the base of his government and continued to rig elections. Meanwhile, in the US, his support among the AFV also declined, in part due to his ongoing authoritarianism and also because of his persistent complaints to them about negative media depictions of his regime; many Vietnamese leaders of various persuasions did not understand that Western governments did not control their own media. Pressure also increased on Diệm at home, as the communists intensified their insurgency against him. In November 1960, discontent in his own army prompted a failed coup attempt by paratroopers. Although Diệm eventually organized for loyalists to put down the coup, he was angered by Durbrow's calls for him to try to negotiate a settlement, regarding the lack of support for his zero tolerance policy as a betrayal.

In 1963, mass civil disobedience broke out due to discontent from the Buddhist majority over Diệm's discrimination against them, sparked by the fatal shootings of nine people who were demonstrating against the ban on the Buddhist flag. The US began to lose confidence in Diệm's ability to run the country effectively and prevent the growth of the communist insurgency, and concluded that he was an obstacle to religious and thus national stability. During this time, the American press corps wrote unvarnished stories about the South Vietnamese government's policies and actions, in contrast to the supportive pieces of the 1950s, and Diệm's attempts to physically intimidate correspondents backfired. After Diệm tried to settle the Buddhist crisis by launching synchronized raids on Buddhist temples across the country to round up those monks who were leading protests against him, the Americans began to look for alternative leadership, sending Cable 243 to their embassy in Saigon to authorise the search for someone to replace Diệm. In November 1963, Diệm was overthrown in a US-backed coup and he and Nhu were captured and executed.

== See also ==
- United States–Vietnam relations
