= Hà Đông =

Hà Đông may refer to several places in Vietnam, including:

- Hà Đông ward, a ward of Hanoi
- Hà Đông district, a former urban district of Hanoi
- Hà Đông province, former province
- Hà Đông, Gia Lai, a commune of Đắk Đoa District
- Hà Đông, Lâm Đồng, a commune of Đạ Tẻh District
- Hà Đông, Thanh Hóa, a commune of Hà Trung District
