= Hà Trung =

- Commune
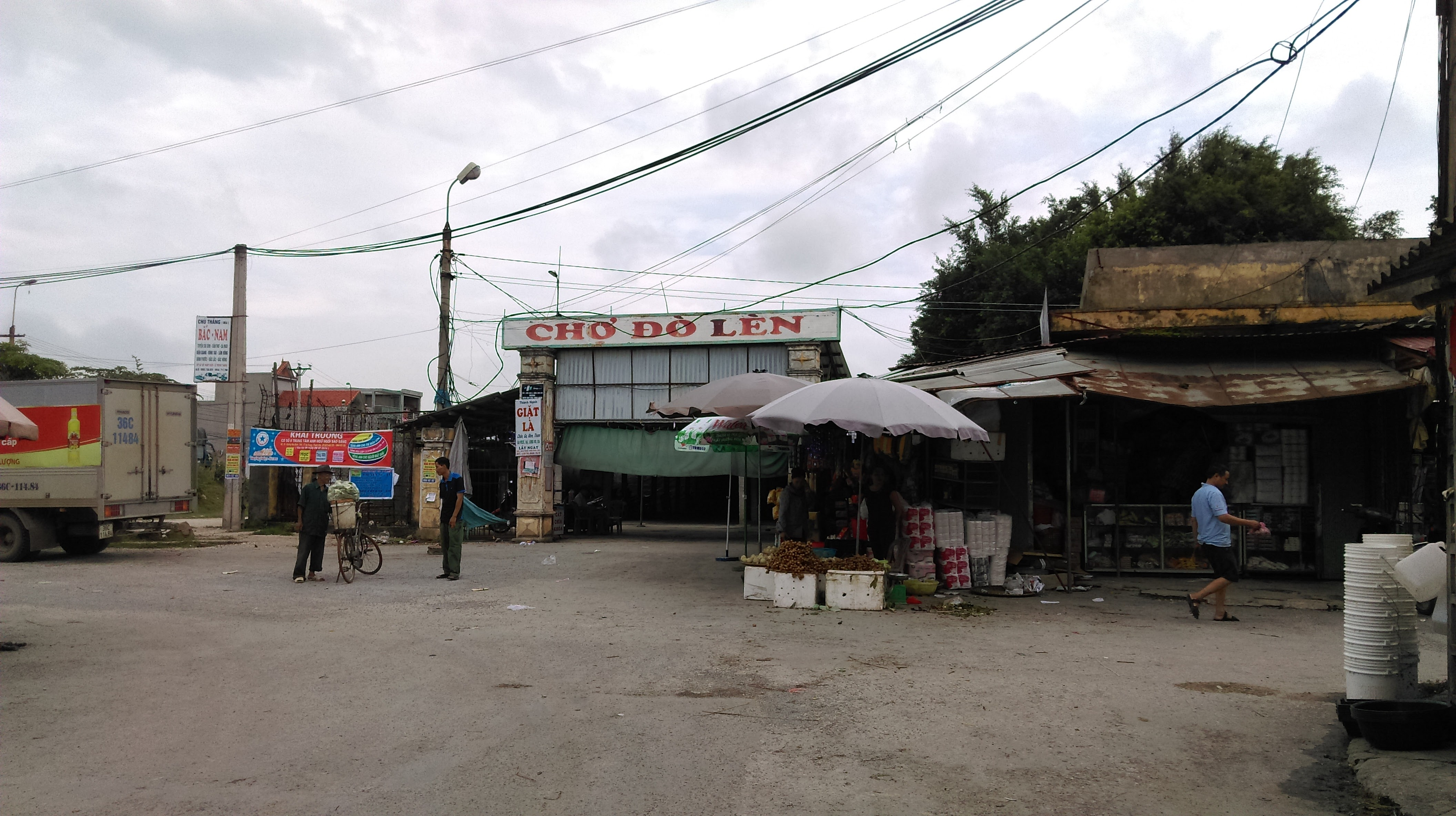
- Đò Lèn Market in Hà Trung
- Interactive map of Hà Trung
- Coordinates: 20.018746955199937°N 105.85144329999973°E
- Country: Vietnam
- Region: North Central Coast
- Province: Thanh Hóa
- Established: 16 June 2025
- Administrative headquarters: Former Hamlet 6

Area
  - Total: 34.14 km^{2} (13.18 sq mi)

Population (2024)
  - Total: 30,151
  - Density: 882/km^{2} (2,280/sq mi)
- Postal code: 40606
- Website: hatrung.thanhhoa.gov.vn

Hà Trung is a commune in Thanh Hóa province, Vietnam. The commune inherited its name from the former Hà Trung district.

On 16 June 2025, Hà Trung district was dissolved as part of the 2025 Vietnamese administrative reform, which abolished the district-level administrative system. Hà Trung Commune was established under Resolution No. 1686/NQ-UBTVQH15 of the Standing Committee of the National Assembly of Vietnam, through the merger of the area and population of:

- the entirety of Hà Đông, Hà Ngọc, and Yến Sơn communes;
- most of Hà Trung township, with the remaining area merged into Hoạt Giang commune;
- the areas of Xuân Sơn, Nhân Lý, and Xuân Áng hamlets of Hà Bình commune, with the remaining area merged into Hoạt Giang Commune.
