= Bỉm Sơn (town) =

- District-level town (Class-3)
- Bỉm Sơn Town; Thị xã Bỉm Sơn
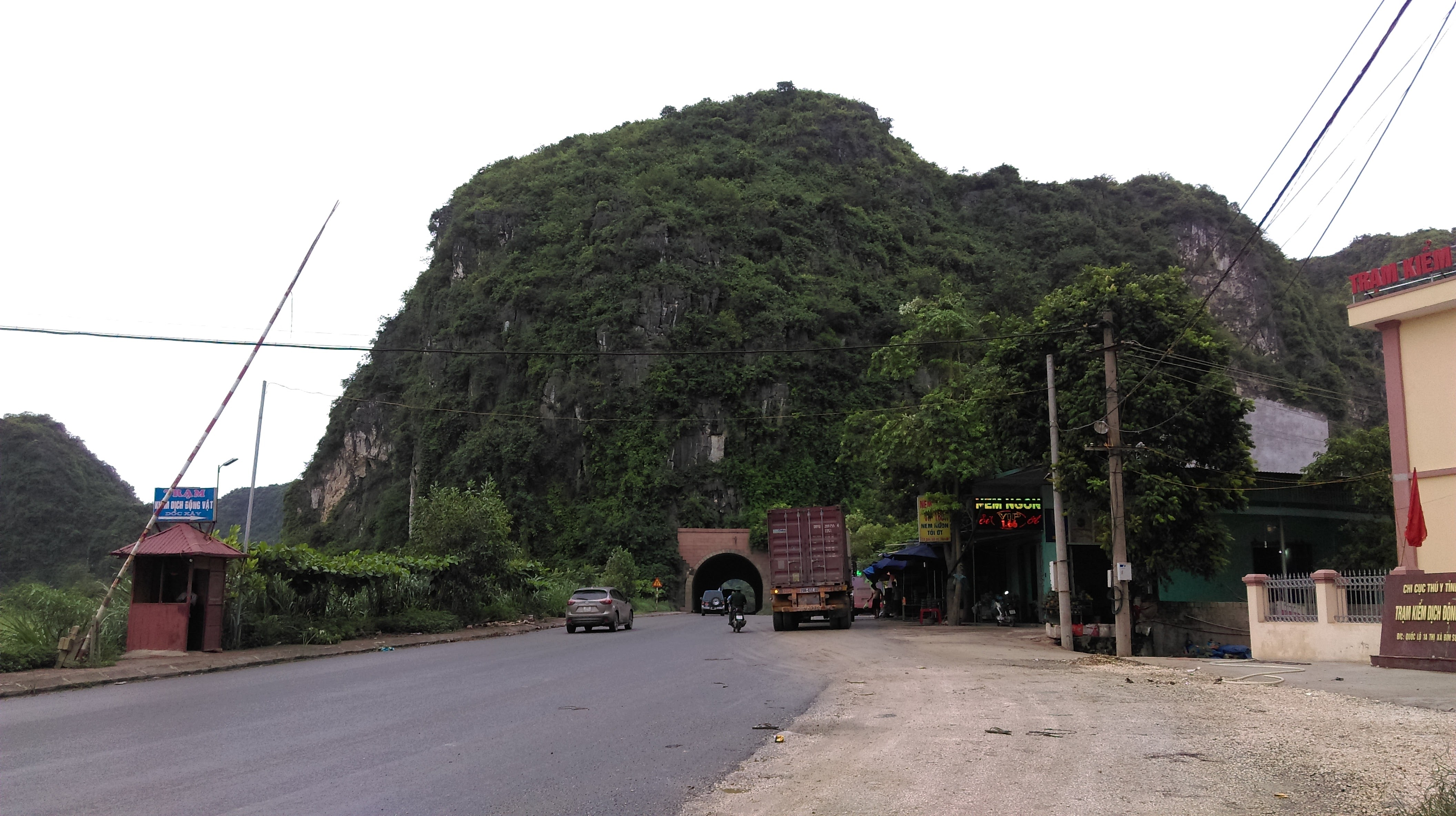
- Doc Construction Tunnel on National Highway 1

- Location of Bỉm Sơn in Vietnam
- Coordinates: 20°4′41″N 105°51′37″E
- Country: Vietnam
- Province: Thanh Hóa
- Established: 18 December 1981

Area
  - Total: 67.01 km^{2} (25.87 sq mi)

Population (2019)
  - Total: 100,820
  - Density: 820.3/km^{2} (2,125/sq mi)
- Climate: Cwa

Bỉm Sơn is a former district-level town (thị xã) of Thanh Hóa province in the North Central Coast region of Vietnam. As of 2003 the district had a population of 54,084. The district covers an area of 67 km^{2} (26 sq mi). The district capital lies at Bỉm Sơn.
