= Hà Trung district =

Coordinates: 20.033°N 105.833°E

Hà Trung district Huyện Hà Trung
- District
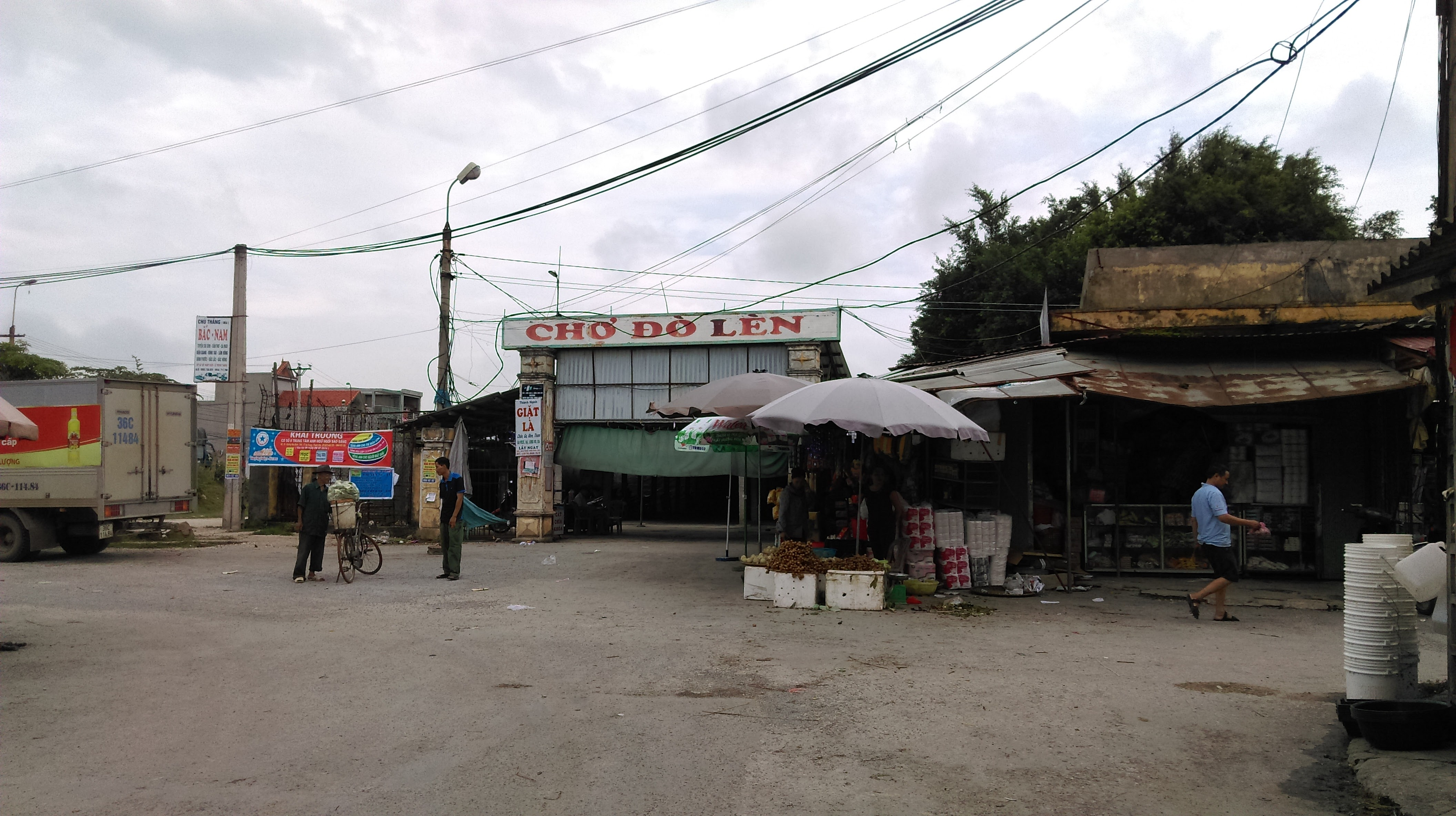
- Chợ Đò Lèn market
- Interactive map of Hà Trung district
- Country: Vietnam
- Region: North Central Coast
- Province: Thanh Hóa
- Capital: Hà Trung

Government
  - President: Nguyễn Ngọc Thức
  - Federal Council Chairman: Nguyễn Văn Tuấn
  - Party Secretary: Lê Văn Dậu

Area
  - District: 94.19 sq mi (243.94 km^{2})

Population (2022)
  - District: 131,568
  - Density: 1,396.9/sq mi (539.35/km^{2})
  - Urban: 11,133
  - Metro: 120,435
- Time zone: UTC+07:00 (ICT)
- Postal code: 40xxx–42xxx
- Area codes: 237
- Vehicle registration: 36
- Website: hatrung.thanhhoa.gov.vn

Hà Trung is a former district (huyện) of Thanh Hóa province in the North Central Coast region of Vietnam.

As of 2022 the district had a population of 131,568. The district covers an area of 243.94 km^{2}. The district capital lies at Hà Trung.
