= Arrest and assassination of Ngo Dinh Diem =

1963 murder in Saigon, South Vietnam

Assassination of Ngô Đình Diệm
- Part of the 1963 South Vietnamese coup d'état and Buddhist crisis
- Death certificate of Ngô Đình Diệm
- Location: Saigon, South Vietnam
- Date: 2 November 1963; 63 years ago
- Target: Ngô Đình Diệm
- Deaths: Ngô Đình Diệm; Ngô Đình Nhu
- Perpetrator: Nguyễn Văn Nhung

On 2 November 1963, Ngô Đình Diệm, the president of South Vietnam, was arrested and assassinated in a CIA-backed coup d'état led by General Dương Văn Minh. After years of autocratic and nepotistic family rule in the country, discontent with the Diệm regime had been simmering below the surface and culminated with mass Buddhist protests against religious discrimination after the Huế Phật Đản shootings of protesters who defied a ban on the flying of the Buddhist flag.

The Army of the Republic of Vietnam (ARVN) launched a bloody overnight siege on Gia Long Palace in Saigon. When rebel forces entered the palace, Diệm and his adviser and younger brother Ngô Đình Nhu were not present, having escaped to a loyalist shelter in Cholon. The brothers kept in communication with the rebels through a direct link from the shelter to the palace, and misled them into believing that they were still in the palace. The Ngô brothers soon agreed to surrender and were promised safe exile. After being arrested, they were instead assassinated in the back of a M113 armoured personnel carrier by ARVN officers on the journey back to military headquarters near Tân Sơn Nhứt Air Base.

While no formal inquiry was conducted, the responsibility for the deaths of the Ngô brothers is commonly placed on Minh's bodyguard, Captain Nguyễn Văn Nhung, and on Major Dương Hiếu Nghĩa, both of whom guarded the brothers during the trip. Minh's army colleagues and US officials in Saigon agreed that Minh ordered the assassinations. They postulated various motives, including that the brothers had embarrassed Minh by fleeing the Gia Long Palace, and that the brothers were killed to prevent a later political comeback.

The generals initially attempted to cover up the assassination by suggesting that the brothers had committed suicide, but this was contradicted when photos of the Ngôs' corpses surfaced in the media.

== Background ==
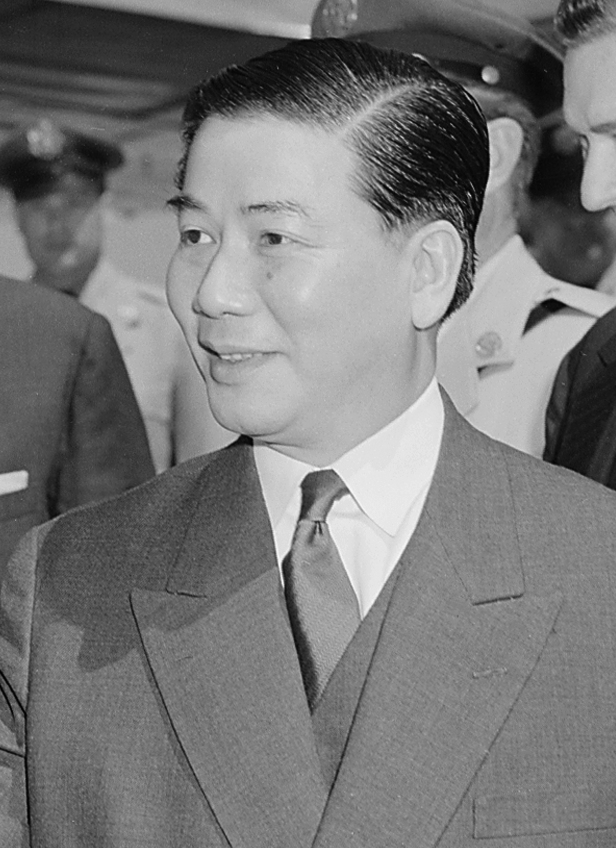
Ngô Đình Diệm

Upon returning from exile in June 1954, Diệm was appointed Prime Minister of the State of Vietnam by former emperor Bảo Đại, who was Head of State. Vietnam was soon partitioned at the Geneva Conference after the defeat of the French Union forces at the Battle of Dien Bien Phu, with the State of Vietnam ruling the country south of the 17th parallel north. The partition was intended to be temporary, with national elections scheduled for 1956 to create a government of a reunified nation.

Diệm was well known for his firm anti-communist and anti-colonialist stance. He and Bảo Đại were later locked in a power struggle. Diệm scheduled a referendum for October 1955 on whether South Vietnam should become a republic. He won the rigged referendum and proclaimed himself the President of the newly created Republic of Vietnam.

Diệm refused to hold the reunification elections, on the basis that the State of Vietnam was not a signatory to the Geneva Accords. He then proceeded to strengthen his autocratic and nepotistic rule over the country. A constitution was written by a rubber stamp legislature which gave Diệm the power to create laws by decree and arbitrarily give himself emergency powers. Dissidents, both communist and nationalist, were jailed and executed in the thousands and elections were routinely rigged. Opposition candidates were threatened with being charged for conspiring with the Viet Cong, which carried the death penalty, and in many areas, large numbers of ARVN troops were sent to stuff ballot boxes.

Diệm kept the control of the nation firmly within the hands of his brothers and their in-laws and promotions in the ARVN were given on the basis of religion and loyalty rather than merit. Two unsuccessful attempts had been made to depose Diệm. In 1960 the uprising of the paratroopers was suppressed. Diem was trapped in his palace, but he managed to buy time with promises of negotiations and concessions until two ARVN divisions arrived in the capital and put down the rebellion. In 1962 two Republic of Vietnam Air Force pilots bombed the presidential palace, but Diem was not injured. South Vietnam's Buddhist majority had long been discontented with Diệm's strong favoritism towards Catholics. Public servants and army officers had long been promoted on the basis of religious preference, and government contracts, US economic assistance, business favors and tax concessions were preferentially given to Catholics. The Catholic Church was the largest landowner in the country, and its holdings were exempt from land reform. In the countryside, Catholics were de facto exempt from performing corvée labour. Discontent with Diệm and Nhu exploded into mass protest during the summer of 1963 when nine Buddhists died at the hand of Diệm's army and police on Vesak, the birthday of Gautama Buddha.

In May 1963, a law against the flying of religious flags was selectively invoked; the Buddhist flag was banned from display on Vesak while the Vatican flag was displayed to celebrate the anniversary of the consecration of Archbishop Pierre Martin Ngô Đình Thục, Diệm's elder brother. The Buddhists defied the ban and a protest was ended when government forces opened fire. With Diệm remaining intransigent in the face of escalating Buddhist demands for religious equality, sections of society began calling for his removal from power. The key turning point came shortly after midnight on 21 August, when Nhu's Special Forces raided and vandalised Buddhist pagodas across the country, arresting thousands of monks and causing a death toll estimated to be in the hundreds. Numerous coup plans had been explored by the army before, but the plotters intensified their activities with increased confidence after the administration of US President John F. Kennedy authorised the US embassy to explore the possibility of a leadership change.

== Surrender and debate ==
At 13:30 on 1 November, Generals Dương Văn Minh and Trần Văn Đôn, respectively the Presidential Military Adviser and Army Chief of Staff, led a coup against Diệm. The rebels had carefully devised plans to neutralise loyalist officers to prevent them from saving Diệm. Unknown to Diệm, General Đính, the supposed loyalist who commanded the ARVN III Corps that surrounded the Saigon area, had allied himself with the plotters of the coup. The second of Diệm's most trusted loyalist generals was Huỳnh Văn Cao, who commanded the IV Corps in the Mekong Delta. Diệm and Nhu were aware of the coup plan, and Nhu responded by planning a counter-coup, which he called Operation Bravo. This plan involved Đính and Colonel Tung, the loyalist commander of the Special Forces, staging a phony rebellion before their forces crushed the "uprising" to reaffirm the power of the Ngô family. Unaware that Đính was plotting against him, Nhu allowed Đính to organise troops as he saw fit, and Đính transferred the command of the 7th Division based at Mỹ Tho from Cao's IV Corps to his own III Corps. This allowed Colonel Nguyễn Hữu Có, Đính's deputy, to take command of the 7th Division. The transfer allowed the rebels to completely encircle the capital and denied Cao the opportunity of storming Saigon and protecting Diệm, as he had done during the previous coup attempt in 1960. Minh and Đôn had invited senior Saigon based officers to a meeting at the headquarters of the Joint General Staff (JGS), on the pretext of routine business. Instead, they announced that a coup was underway, with only a few, including Tung, refusing to join. Tung was later forced at gunpoint to order his loyalist Special Forces to surrender. The coup went smoothly as the rebels quickly captured all key installations in Saigon and sealed incoming roads to prevent loyalist forces from entering. This left only the Presidential Guard to defend Gia Long Palace. The rebels attacked government and loyalist army buildings but delayed the attack on the palace, hoping that Diệm would resign and accept the offer of safe passage and exile. Diệm refused, vowing to reassert his control. After sunset, the 5th Division of Colonel Nguyễn Văn Thiệu, who later became the nation's president, led an assault on Gia Long Palace and it fell by daybreak.

In the early morning of 2 November, Diệm agreed to surrender. The ARVN officers had intended to exile Diệm and Nhu, having promised the Ngô brothers safe passage out of the country. At 06:00, just before dawn, the officers held a meeting at JGS headquarters to discuss the fate of the Ngô brothers. According to Lucien Conein, the US Army and CIA officer who was the American liaison with the coup, most of the officers, including Minh, wanted Diệm to have an "honorable retirement" from office, followed by exile. Not all of the senior officers attended the meeting, with some having already left to make arrangements for the arrival of Diệm and Nhu at JGS headquarters. General Lê, a former police chief under Diệm in the mid-1950s, strongly lobbied for Diệm's execution. There was no formal vote taken at the meeting, and Lê attracted only minority support. One general was reported to have said, "To kill weeds, you must pull them up at the roots". Conein reported that the generals had never indicated that assassination was in their minds, since an orderly transition of power was a high priority in achieving their ultimate aim of gaining international recognition.

Minh and Đôn asked Conein to secure an American aircraft to take the brothers out of the country. Two days earlier, US Ambassador to South Vietnam Henry Cabot Lodge Jr. had alerted Washington that such a request was likely and recommended Saigon as the departure point. This request put the Kennedy administration in a difficult position, as the provision of an airplane would publicly tie it to the coup. When Conein telephoned David Smith, the acting chief of the Saigon CIA station, there was a ten-minute delay. The US government would not allow the aircraft to land in any country, unless that state was willing to grant asylum to Diệm. The United States did not want Diệm and Nhu to form a government in exile and wanted them far away from Vietnam. Assistant Secretary of State Roger Hilsman had written in August that "under no circumstances should the Ngô brothers be permitted to remain in Southeast Asia in close proximity to Vietnam because of the plots they will mount to try to regain power. If the generals decide to exile Diệm, he should also be sent outside Southeast Asia." He further went on to anticipate what he termed a "Götterdämmerung in the palace".

We should encourage the coup group to fight the battle to the end and destroy the palace if necessary to gain victory. Unconditional surrender should be the terms for the Ngô family since it will otherwise seek to outmaneuver both the coups forces and the US. If the family is taken alive, the Ngô brothers should be banished to France or any other country willing to receive them. Diệm should be treated as the generals wish.

After surrendering, Diệm called Lodge by telephone for the last time. Lodge did not report the conversation to Washington, so it was widely assumed that the pair last spoke on the previous afternoon when the coup was just starting. However, after Lodge died in 1985, his aide, Colonel Mike Dunn said that Lodge and Diệm spoke for the last time around 07:00 on 2 November moments after Diệm surrendered. When Diệm called, Lodge "put [him] on hold" and then walked away. Upon his return, the ambassador offered Diệm and Nhu asylum, but would not arrange for transportation to the Philippines until the next day. This contradicted his earlier offer of asylum the previous day when he implored Diệm to not resist the coup. Dunn offered to personally go to the brothers' hideout to escort him so that the generals could not kill him, but Lodge refused, saying, "We just can't get that involved." Dunn said, "I was really astonished that we didn't do more for them." Having refused to help the brothers to leave the country safely, Lodge later said after they had been shot, "What would we have done with them if they had lived? Every Colonel Blimp in the world would have made use of them."

Dunn also claimed that Lodge put Diệm on hold in order to inform Conein where the Ngô brothers were so the generals could capture them. When confronted about Dunn's claim by an historian, Conein denied the account. It was also revealed that Conein had phoned the embassy early on the same morning to inquire about the generals' request for a plane to transport Diệm and Nhu out of Saigon. One of Lodge's staff told Conein that the plane would have to go directly to the faraway asylum-offering country, so that the brothers could not disembark at a nearby stopover country and stay there to foment a counter-coup. Conein was told that the nearest plane that was capable of such a long range flight was in Guam, and it would take 24 hours to make the necessary arrangements. Minh was astounded and told Conein that the generals could not hold Diệm for that period. Conein did not suspect a deliberate delay by the American embassy. In contrast, a US Senate investigative commission in the early 1970s raised a provocative thought: "One wonders what became of the US military aircraft that had been dispatched to stand by for Lodge's departure, scheduled for the previous day." The historian Mark Moyar suspected that Lodge could have flown Diệm to Clark Air Force Base in the Philippines, which was under American jurisdiction, before taking him to the final destination. Moyar speculated that "when Lodge had offered the jet the day before, he had done it to induce Diệm to give up at a time when the outcome of the insurrection was very much in doubt. Now that the coup clearly had succeeded, Lodge no longer needed to offer such an incentive."

== Intended arrest at Gia Long Palace ==
In the meantime, Minh left the JGS headquarters and traveled to Gia Long Palace in a sedan with his aide and bodyguard, Captain Nguyễn Văn Nhung. Minh arrived at the palace at 08:00 in full military ceremonial uniform to supervise the arrest of Diệm and Nhu. Minh had also dispatched an M113 armored personnel carrier and four jeeps to Gia Long Palace to transport an arrested Diệm and Nhu back to JGS headquarters for official surrender. While Minh was on the way to supervise the takeover of the palace, Generals Đôn, Trần Thiện Khiêm and Lê Văn Kim prepared the army headquarters for Diệm's arrival and a ceremonial handover of power to the junta. Diệm's pictures were taken down and his statue was covered up. A large table covered with green felt was brought in with the intention of seating Diệm for the handover to Minh and Vice President Nguyễn Ngọc Thơ, who was to become the civilian Prime Minister. In a nationally televised event witnessed by international media, Diệm would "ask" the generals that he and his brother be granted exile and asylum in a foreign country, which would be granted. The brothers were then to be held in a secure place at JGS headquarters while awaiting deportation.

== Diệm's escape ==
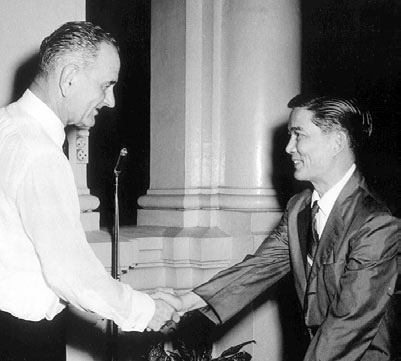
Diệm's brother Ngô Đình Nhu (right), shaking hands with then US Vice President Lyndon B. Johnson in 1961

Minh instead arrived to find that the brothers were not in the palace. In anticipation of a coup, they had ordered the construction of three separate tunnels leading from Gia Long to remote areas outside the palace. Around 20:00 on the night of the coup, with only the Presidential Guard to defend them against mutinous infantry and armor units, Diệm and Nhu hurriedly packed American banknotes into a briefcase. They escaped through one of the tunnels with two loyalists: Air Force Lieutenant Ðỗ Thơ, Diệm's aide-de-camp, who happened to be a nephew of Colonel Đỗ Mậu, the director of military security and a participant in the coup plot, and Xuân Vy, head of Nhu's Republican Youth. After the coup, Military Assistance Command, Vietnam General Paul Harkins inspected the tunnel and noted that it "was so far down that I didn't want to go down to walk up the thing". The brothers emerged in a wooded area in a park near the Cercle Sportif (10.776°N 106.693°E), the city's upper class sporting club, where they were picked up by a waiting Land Rover. Ellen Hammer disputes the tunnel escape, asserting that the Ngô brothers simply walked out of the building, which was then not yet under siege. She writes that they walked past the tennis courts and left the palace grounds through a small gate at Le Thanh Ton Street and entered the car. [Further to the matter, Lucien Conein before a Senate select committee in Washington on Friday 20 June 1975 gave testimony that there existed an administrative tunnel for functional bureaucratic purposes between Diem's Palace and nearby Saigon City Hall and which tunnel was used on the evening in question for the purpose of leaving the area and finding the ready waiting car in front of the City Hall building.] The loyalists traveled through narrow back streets in order to evade rebel checkpoints and changed vehicles to a black Citroën sedan. After leaving the palace, Nhu was reported to have suggested to Diệm that the brothers split up, arguing that this would enhance their chances of survival. Nhu proposed that one of them travel to the Mekong Delta to join Cao's IV Corps, while the other would travel to the II Corps of General Nguyễn Khánh in the Central Highlands. Nhu felt the rebel generals would not dare to kill one of them while the other was free, in case the surviving brother were to regain power. According to one account, Diệm was reported to have turned down Nhu, reasoning that "You cannot leave alone. They hate you too much; they will kill you. Stay with me and I will protect you." Another story holds that Diệm said "We have always been together during these last years. How could we separate during these last years? How could we separate in this critical hour?" Nhu agreed to remain with his brother.

The loyalists reached the home of Ma Tuyen in the Chinese business district of Cholon. Ma Tuyen was a Chinese merchant and friend who was reported to be Nhu's main contact with the Chinese syndicates which controlled the opium trade. The brothers sought asylum from the embassy of the Republic of China, but were turned down and stayed in Ma Tuyen's house as they appealed to ARVN loyalists and attempted to negotiate with the coup leaders. Nhu's secret agents had fitted the home with a direct phone line to the palace, so the insurgent generals believed that the brothers were still besieged inside Gia Long. Neither the rebels nor the loyalist Presidential Guard had any idea that at 21:00 they were about to fight for an empty building. Minh was reported to be mortified when he realised that Diệm and Nhu had escaped during the night.

== Arrest in Cholon ==
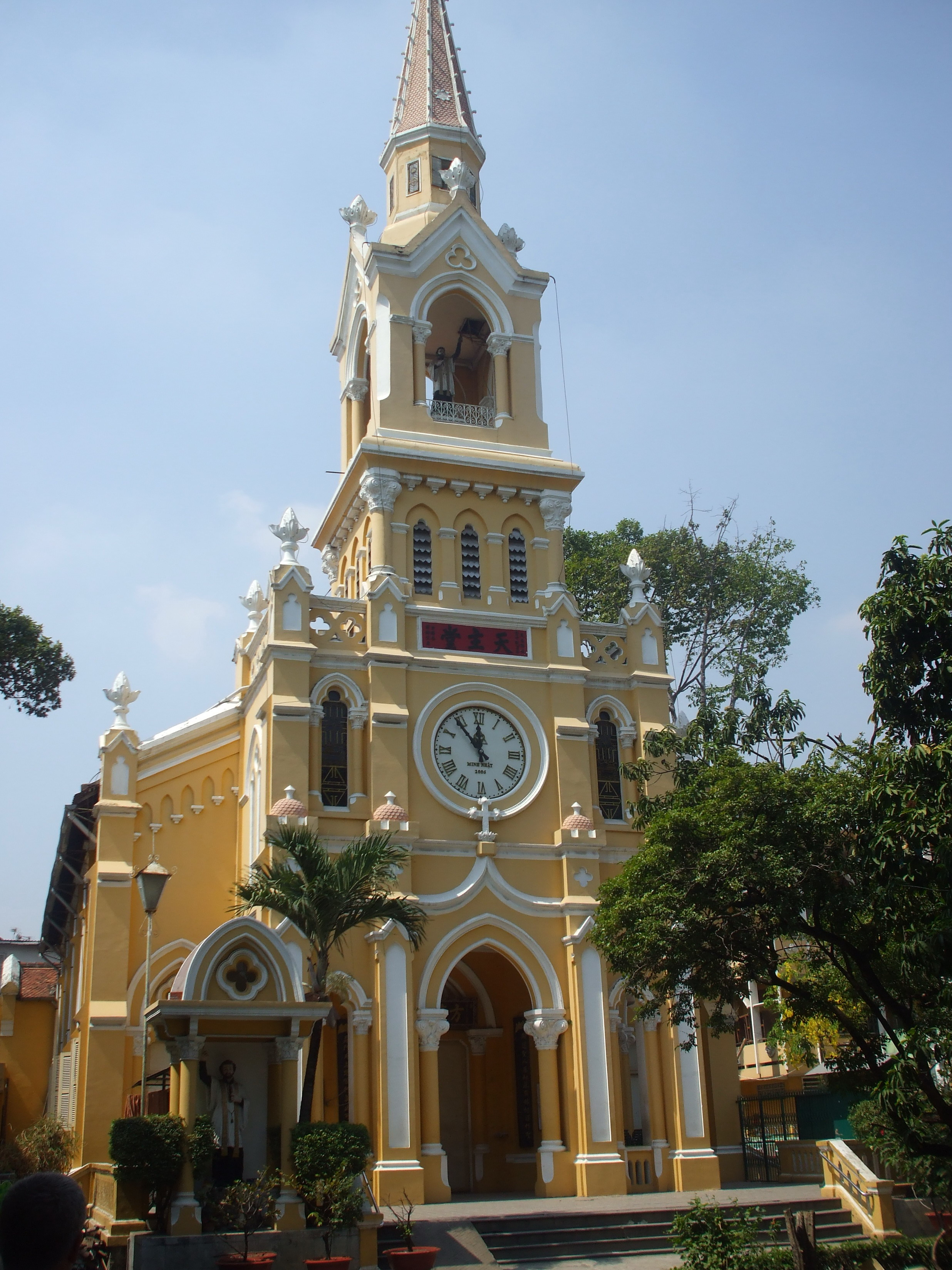
St. Francis Xavier's Church, where the Ngo brothers were arrested

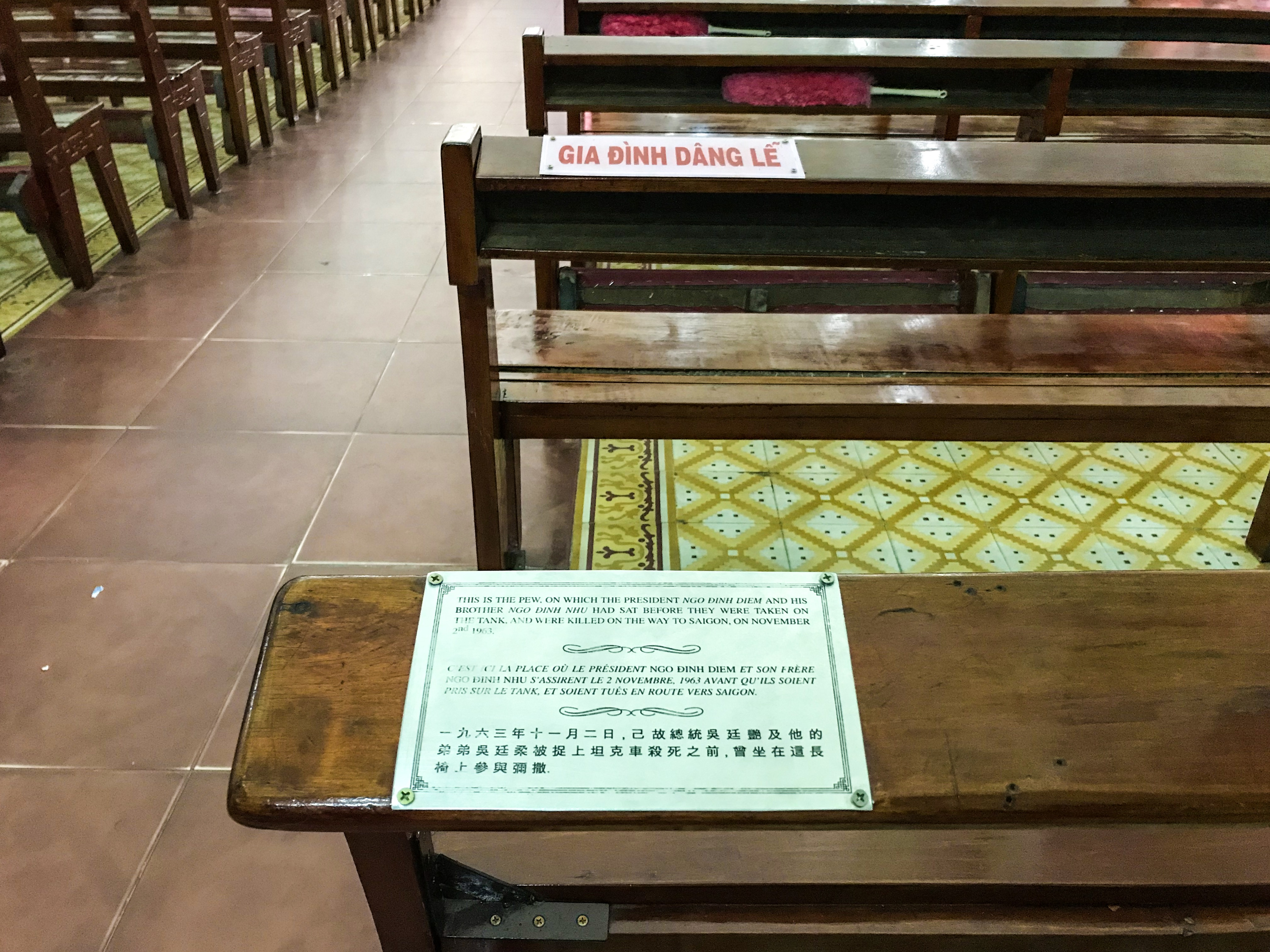
A pew in the church is marked with a small plaque identifying the spot where President Ngo Dinh Diem was seized after taking refuge here with his brother Ngo Dinh Nhu on 2 November 1963, after fleeing the Presidential Palace.

After Minh had ordered the rebels to search the areas known to have been frequented by the Ngô family, Colonel Phạm Ngọc Thảo was informed by a captured Presidential Guard officer that the brothers had escaped through the tunnels to a refuge in Cholon. Thảo was told by Khiêm, his superior, to locate Diệm and prevent him from being killed. When Thảo arrived at Ma Tuyen's house, he phoned his superiors. Diệm and Nhu overheard him and Thơ drove them to the nearby St. Francis Xavier's Church (10.752°N 106.654°E), which they had frequented over the years. Lieutenant Thơ died a few months later in a plane crash, but his diary was not found until 1970. Thơ recorded Diệm's words as they left the house of Ma Tuyen as being "I don't know whether I will live or die and I don't care, but tell Nguyễn Khánh that I have great affection for him and he should avenge me". Soon after the early morning Mass was celebrated for All Souls' Day (the Catholic day of the dead) and after the congregation had left the building, the Ngô brothers walked through the shady courtyard and into the church wearing dark grey suits. It was speculated that they were recognised by an informant as they walked through the yard. Inside the church, the brothers prayed and received Communion.

A few minutes later, just after 10:00, an armoured personnel carrier and two jeeps entered the narrow alcove housing the church building. Lieutenant Thơ, who had earlier urged Diệm to surrender, saying that he was sure that his uncle Đỗ Mậu, along with Đính and Khiêm, would guarantee their safety, wrote in his diary later "I consider myself responsible for having led them to their death".

== Convoy to JGS headquarters ==
The convoy was led by General Mai Hữu Xuân and consisted of Colonels Nguyễn Văn Quan and Dương Ngọc Lắm. Quan was the deputy of Minh and Lắm was the Commander of the Civil Guard. Lắm had joined the coup once a rebel victory seemed assured. Two further officers made up the convoy: Major Dương Hiếu Nghĩa and Captain Nhung, Minh's bodyguard.

Diệm requested that the convoy stop at the palace so that he could gather personal items before being exiled. Xuân turned him down, clinically stating that his orders were to take Diệm and Nhu directly to JGS headquarters. Nhu expressed disgust that they were to be transported in an APC, asking, "You use such a vehicle to drive the president?" Lắm assured them that the armour was for their own protection. Xuân said that it was selected to protect them from "extremists". Xuân ordered the brothers' hands be tied behind their backs before shoving them into the carrier. One officer asked to shoot Nhu, but Xuân turned him down.

== Attack ==
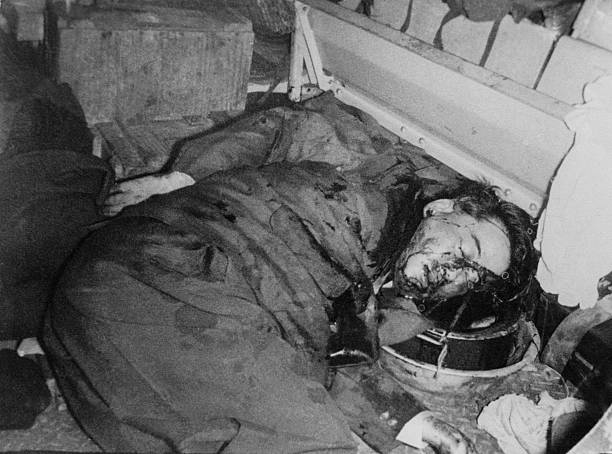
Diệm's corpse in the back of the M113

After the arrest, Nhung and Nghĩa sat with the brothers in the APC, and the convoy departed for Tân Sơn Nhất. Before the convoy had departed for the church, Minh was reported to have gestured to Nhung with two fingers. This was taken to be an order to kill both brothers. The convoy stopped at a railroad crossing on the return trip, where by all accounts the brothers were assassinated. An investigation by Đôn determined that Nghĩa had shot the brothers at point-blank range with a semi-automatic firearm and that Nhung sprayed them with bullets before repeatedly stabbing the bodies with a knife.

Nghĩa gave his account of what occurred during the journey back to the military headquarters: "As we rode back to the Joint General Staff headquarters, Diệm sat silently, but Nhu and the captain [Nhung] began to insult each other. I don't know who started it. The name-calling grew passionate. The captain had hated Nhu before. Now he was charged with emotion." Nghĩa said that when the convoy reached a train crossing, "[Nhung] lunged at Nhu with a bayonet and stabbed him again and again, maybe fifteen or twenty times. Still in a rage, he turned to Diệm, took out his revolver and shot him in the head. Then he looked back at Nhu, who was lying on the floor, twitching. He put a bullet into his head too. Neither Diệm nor Nhu ever defended themselves. Their hands were tied."

== Attempted cover-up ==
When the corpses arrived at JGS headquarters, the generals were shocked. Although they despised and had no sympathy for Nhu, they still respected Diệm. One general broke down and wept while Minh's assistant, Colonel Nguyễn Văn Quan, collapsed on a table. General Đính later declared, "I couldn't sleep that night". Đôn maintained that the generals were "truly grievous" over the deaths, maintaining that they were sincere in their intentions to give Diệm a safe exile. Đôn charged Nhu with convincing Diệm to reject the offer. Lodge later concluded, "Once again, brother Nhu proves to be the evil genius in Diệm's life."

=== ARVN reaction ===
Đôn ordered another general to tell reporters that the Ngô brothers had died in an accident. He went to confront Minh in his office.

- Đôn: Why are they dead?
- Minh: And what does it matter that they are dead?

At this time, Xuân walked into Minh's office through the open door, unaware of Đôn's presence. Xuân snapped to attention and stated, "Mission accomplished." Shortly after midnight on 2 November 1963 in Washington, D.C. the CIA sent word to the White House that Diệm and Nhu were dead, allegedly by suicide. Vietnam Radio had announced their deaths by poison, and that they had committed suicide while prisoners in an APC transporting them to Tân Sơn Nhứt. Unclear and contradictory stories abounded. General Harkins reported that the suicides had occurred either by gunshot or by a grenade wrestled from the belt of an ARVN officer who was standing guard. Minh tried to explain the discrepancy, saying "Due to an inadvertence, there was a gun inside the vehicle. It was with this gun that they committed suicide."

=== US reaction ===
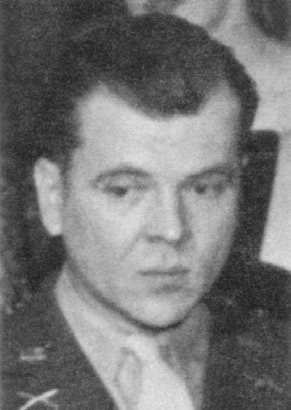
Lucien Conein, the CIA's contact with the ARVN generals

Kennedy learned of the deaths on the following morning when National Security Council staffer Michael Forrestal rushed into the cabinet room with a telegram reporting the Ngô brothers' alleged suicides. According to General Maxwell Taylor, "Kennedy leaped to his feet and rushed from the room with a look of shock and dismay on his face which I had never seen before." Kennedy had planned that Diệm would be safely exiled and Arthur M. Schlesinger Jr. recalled that Kennedy was "somber and shaken". Kennedy later penned a memo, lamenting that the assassination was "particularly abhorrent" and blaming himself for approving Cable 243, which had authorised Lodge to explore coup options in the wake of Nhu's attacks on the Buddhist pagodas. Forrestal said that "It shook him personally ... bothered him as a moral and religious matter. It shook his confidence, I think, in the kind of advice he was getting about South Vietnam." When Kennedy was consoled by a friend who told him he need not feel sorry for the Ngô brothers on the grounds of despotism, Kennedy replied "No. They were in a difficult position. They did the best they could for their country."

Kennedy's reaction did not draw sympathy from his entire administration. Some believed that he should not have supported the coup and that as coups were uncontrollable, assassination was always a possibility. Kennedy was skeptical about the story and suspected that a double assassination had taken place. He reasoned the devoutly Catholic Ngô brothers would not have taken their own lives, but Roger Hilsman rationalised the possibility of suicide by asserting that Diệm and Nhu would have interpreted the coup as Armageddon. US officials soon became aware of the true reasons for the deaths of Diệm and Nhu. Lucien Conein had left the rebel headquarters as the generals were preparing to bring in the Ngô brothers for the press conference which announced the handover of power. Upon returning to his residence, Conein received a phone call from Saigon's CIA station that ordered him to report to the embassy. The embassy informed Conein that Kennedy had instructed him to find Diệm. Conein returned to Tân Sơn Nhứt at around 10:30. The following conversation was reported:

- Conein: Where were Diem and Nhu?
- Minh: They committed suicide. They were in the Catholic Church at Cholon, and they committed suicide.
- C: Look, you're a Buddhist, I'm a Catholic. If they committed suicide at that church and the priest holds mass tonight, that story won't hold water. Where are they?
- M: Their bodies are behind General Staff Headquarters. Do you want to see them?
- C: No.
- M: Why not?
- C: Well, if by chance one of a million of the people believe you that they committed suicide in church and I see that they have not committed suicide and I know differently, then if it ever leaks out, I am in trouble.

Conein knew that if he saw the execution wounds, he would not be able to deny that Diem and Nhu had been assassinated. Conein refused to see the proof, realising that having such knowledge would compromise his cover and his safety. He returned to the embassy and submitted his report to Washington. The CIA in Saigon later secured a set of photos of the brothers that left no doubt that they had been executed. The photos were taken at about 10:00 on 2 November and showed the dead brothers covered in blood on the floor of an APC. They were dressed in the robes of Roman Catholic priests with their hands tied behind their backs. Their faces were bloodied and bruised and they had been repeatedly stabbed. The images appeared to be genuine, discrediting the generals' claims that the brothers had committed suicide. The pictures were distributed around the world, having been sold to media outlets in Saigon. The caption below a picture published in Time read "'Suicide' with no hands."

== Media reaction ==
After the deaths, the military junta asserted that the Ngô brothers had committed suicide. On 6 November, Information Minister Trần Tự Oai declared at a news conference that Diệm and Nhu had died through "accidental suicide" after a firearm discharged when Nhu had tried to seize it from the arresting officer. This drew immediate skepticism from David Halberstam of The New York Times, who won a Pulitzer Prize for his Vietnam reporting. Halberstam wrote to the US Department of State that "extremely reliable private military sources" had confirmed that the brothers were ordered to be executed upon their return to military headquarters. Neil Sheehan of UPI reported a similar account based on what he described as "highly reliable sources". Father Leger of Saint Francis Xavier Catholic Church asserted that the Ngô brothers were kneeling inside the building when soldiers burst in, took them outside and into the APC. Lodge had been informed by "an unimpeachable source" that both brothers were shot in the nape of the neck and that Diệm's body bore the signs of a beating.

== Impact and aftermath ==
Once the news of the cause of death of the Ngô brothers began to become public, the United States became concerned at their association with the new junta and their actions during the coup. US Secretary of State Dean Rusk directed Lodge to question Minh about the killings. Lodge cabled back, initially backing the false story disseminated by the generals, saying that their story was plausible because of the supposedly loaded pistol being left on the floor of the vehicle. Rusk was worried about the public relations implications the bloody photographs of the brothers would generate. Lodge showed no alarm in public, congratulating Đôn on the "masterful performance" of the coup and promising diplomatic recognition. Đôn's assertion that the assassinations were unplanned proved sufficient for Lodge, who told the State Department that "I am sure assassination was not at their direction." Minh and Đôn reiterated their position in a meeting with Conein and Lodge on the following day. Several members of the Kennedy administration were appalled by the killings. The Assistant Secretary of State for Far Eastern Affairs W. Averell Harriman declared that "it was a great shock to everybody that they were killed." He postulated that it was an accident and speculated that Nhu may have caused it by insulting the officers who were supervising him. Embassy official Rufus Phillips, who was the US adviser to Nhu's Strategic Hamlet Program, said that "I wanted to sit down and cry", citing the killings as a key factor in the future leadership troubles which beset South Vietnam.

According to historian Howard Jones, the fact "that the killings failed to make the brothers into martyrs constituted a vivid testimonial to the depth of popular hatred they had aroused." The assassinations caused a split within the coup leadership, turning the initial harmony among the generals into discord, and further abroad repulsed American and world opinion, exploding the myth that this new regime would constitute a distinct improvement over their predecessors, and ultimately convinced Washington that even though the leaders' names had changed in Saigon, the situation remained the same. The criticism of the killings further caused the officers to distrust and battle one another for positions in the new government. Đôn expressed his abhorrence at the assassinations by caustically remarking that he had organised the armoured car in an effort to protect Diệm and Nhu. Khanh claimed that the only condition he had put on joining the conspiracy was that Diem would not be killed. According to Jones, "when decisions regarding postcoup affairs took priority, resentment over the killings meshed with the visceral competition over government posts to disassemble the new regime before it fully took form."

== Culpability debate ==
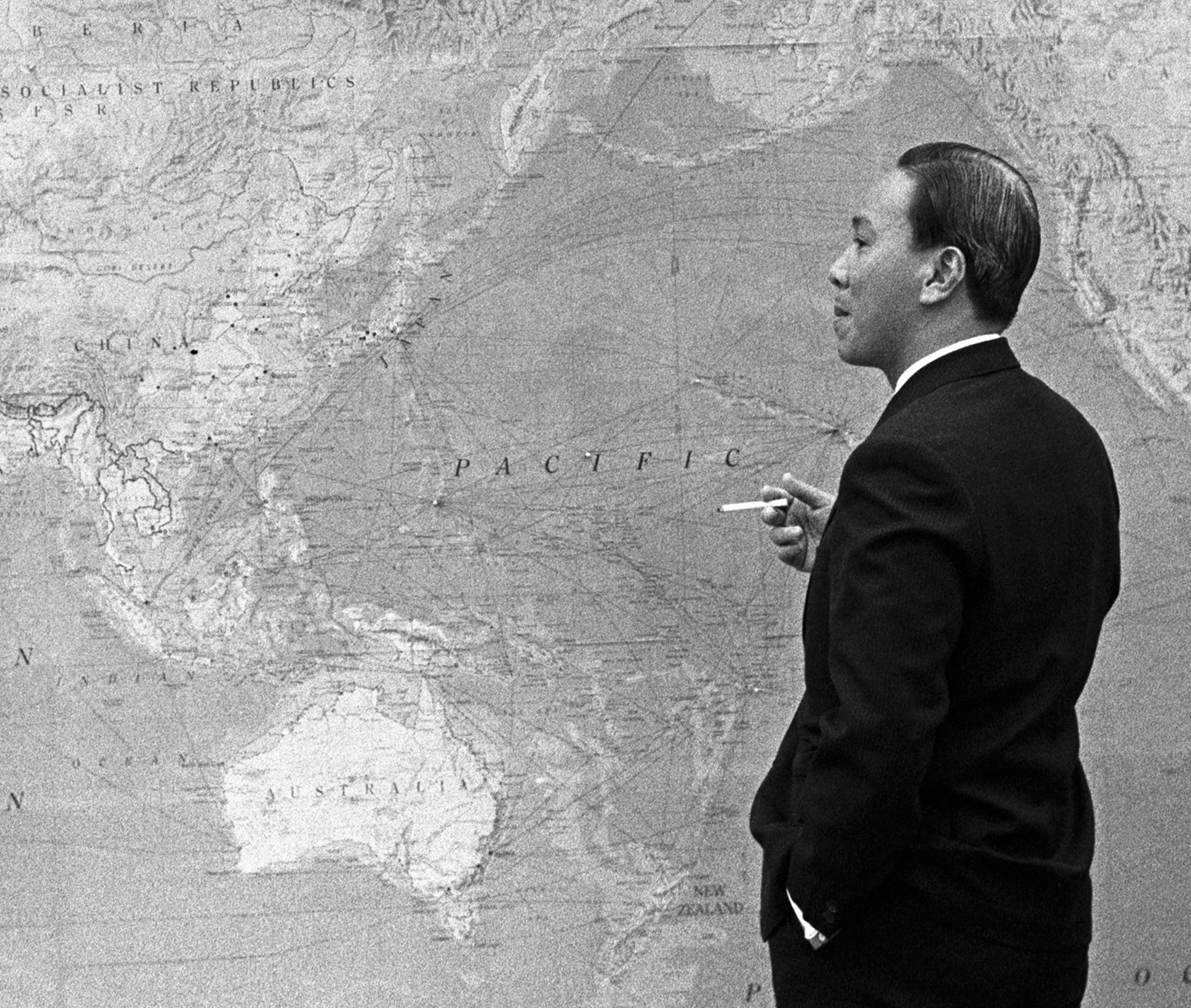
Thiệu (pictured) and Minh blamed one another for the assassinations.

The responsibility for the assassinations was generally placed on Minh. Conein asserted that "I have it on very good authority of very many people, that Big Minh gave the order", as did William Colby, the director of the CIA's Far Eastern division. Đôn was equally emphatic, saying "I can state without equivocation that this was done by General Dương Văn Minh and by him alone." Lodge thought that Xuân was also partly culpable asserting that "Diệm and Nhu had been assassinated, if not by Xuân personally, at least at his direction."

Minh placed the blame for the assassinations on Thiệu, after the latter became president. In 1971, Minh claimed that Thiệu was responsible for the deaths by hesitating and delaying the attack by his Fifth Division on Gia Long Palace. Đôn was reported to have pressured Thieu during the night, asking him on the phone "Why are you so slow in doing it? Do you need more troops? If you do, ask Đính to send more troops – and do it quickly because after taking the palace you will be made a general." Thiệu stridently denied responsibility and issued a statement which Minh did not publicly rebut: "Dương Văn Minh has to assume entire responsibility for the death of Ngô Đình Diệm."

During the presidency of Richard Nixon, a US government investigation was initiated into American involvement in the assassinations. Nixon was a political foe of Kennedy, having narrowly lost to him in the 1960 presidential election. Nixon ordered an investigation under E. Howard Hunt into the murders, convinced that Kennedy must have secretly ordered the killings, but the inquiry was unable to find any such secret order.

== Motivation ==
Conein asserted that Minh's humiliation by Diệm and Nhu was a major motivation for ordering their executions. Conein reasoned that Diệm and Nhu were doomed once they escaped from Gia Long Palace, instead of surrendering there and accepting the offer of safe exile. Having successfully stormed the palace, Minh had presumed that the brothers would be inside, and arrived at the presidential residence in full ceremonial military uniform "with a sedan and everything else." Conein described Minh as a "very proud man" who had lost face at turning up at the palace for his moment of glory, only to find an empty building. More than a decade after the coup, Conein claimed Diệm and Nhu would not have been killed if they had been in the palace, because there were too many people present.

One Vietnamese Diệm loyalist asked friends in the CIA why an assassination had taken place, reasoning that if Diem was deemed to be inefficient, his deposal would suffice. The CIA employees responded that "They had to kill him. Otherwise his supporters would gradually rally and organise and there would be civil war." Some months after the event, Minh was reported to have privately told an American that "We had no alternative. They had to be killed. Diệm could not be allowed to live because he was too much respected among simple, gullible people in the countryside, especially the Catholics and the refugees. We had to kill Nhu because he was so widely feared – and he had created organizations that were arms of his personal power."

Trần Văn Hương, a civilian opposition politician who was jailed in 1960 for signing the Caravelle Manifesto that criticised Diệm, and later briefly served as Prime Minister, gave a scathing analysis of the generals' action. He stated that "The top generals who decided to murder Diệm and his brother were scared to death. The generals knew very well that having no talent, no moral virtues, no political support whatsoever, they could not prevent a spectacular comeback of the president and Mr. Nhu if they were alive."

== Burials of Diệm and Nhu ==
At around 16:00 on 2 November, the bodies of Diệm and Nhu were identified by the wife of former Cabinet minister Trần Trùng Dung. The corpses were taken to St. Paul's Catholic Hospital, where a French doctor made a formal statement of death without conducting an autopsy. The original death certificate did not describe Diệm as Head of State but as "Chief of Province", a post he had held four decades earlier under the French colonial administration. Nhu was described as "Chief of Library Service", a post which he held in the 1940s. This was interpreted as a Vietnamese way of expressing contempt for the two despised leaders. Their place of burial was never disclosed by the junta and rumours regarding it persist to the current day. The speculated burial places include a military prison, a local cemetery, the grounds of the JGS headquarters and there are reports of cremation as well. Nobody was ever prosecuted for the killings.

== Memorial services ==
The government did not approve a public memorial service for the deaths of Diệm and Nhu until 1968. In 1971, several thousand mourners gathered at Diệm's purported gravesite. Catholic prayers were given in Latin. Banners proclaimed Diệm as a saviour of the south, with some mourners having walked into Saigon from villages outside the capital carrying portraits of Diệm. Madame Thiệu, the First Lady, was seen weeping at a requiem Mass at Saigon's basilica. Several cabinet members were also at the grave and a eulogy was given by a general of the ARVN. According to the eulogy, Diệm died because he had resisted the domination of foreigners and their plans to bring great numbers of troops to Vietnam and widen a war which would have destroyed the country. Thiệu sponsored the services, and it was widely seen as a means of associating himself with Diệm's personal characteristics. Diệm frequently refused to follow American advice and was known for his personal integrity, in contrast to Thiệu, who was infamous for corruption and regarded as being too close to the Americans. However, Thiệu's attempts to associate himself with Diệm's relative independence from United States influence was not successful. According to General Maxwell Taylor, Chairman of the US Joint Chiefs of Staff, "there was the memory of Diệm to haunt those of us who were aware of the circumstances of his downfall. By our complicity, we Americans were responsible for the plight in which the South Vietnamese found themselves".

== See also ==
- List of heads of state and government who were assassinated or executed
