= Huế chemical attacks =

1963 tear gas attack in Vietnam

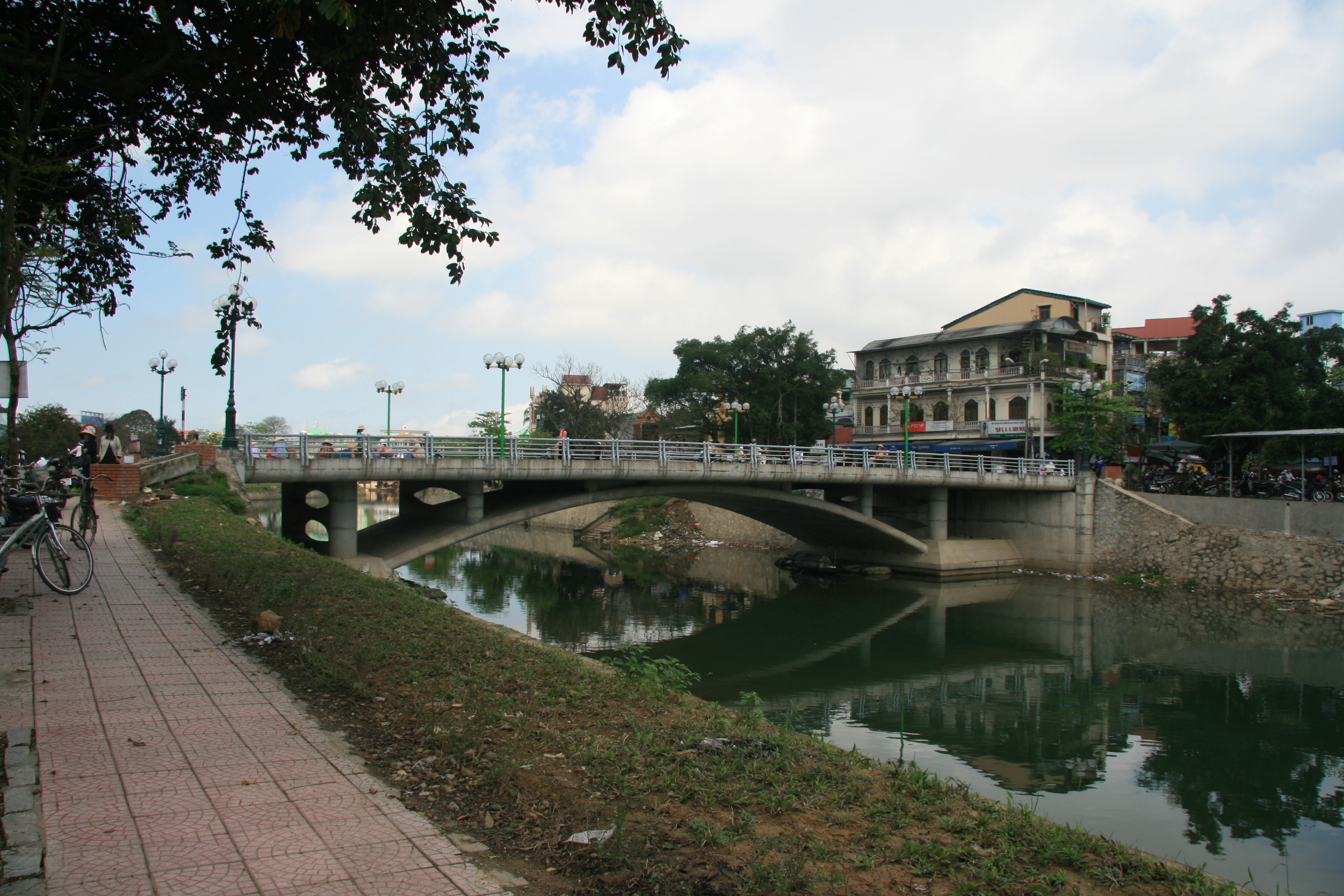
- Bến Ngự Bridge, the location of the attacks
- Location: Bến Ngự Bridge, Perfume River, Huế, South Vietnam
- Date: 3 June 1963
- Target: Buddhist protesters
- Attack type: Liquid components of dismantled World War I tear gas grenades
- Injuries: 67

The Huế chemical attacks occurred on 3 June 1963, when soldiers of the Army of the Republic of Vietnam (ARVN) poured liquid chemicals from tear gas grenades onto the heads of praying Buddhists in Huế, South Vietnam. The Buddhists were protesting against religious discrimination by the regime of the Roman Catholic President Ngô Đình Diệm. The attacks caused 67 people to be hospitalised for blistering of the skin and respiratory ailments.

The protests were part of the Buddhist crisis, during which the Buddhist majority in South Vietnam campaigned for religious equality after nine people were killed by government forces while defying a ban that prevented them from flying the Buddhist flag on Vesak. The incident prompted the United States to privately threaten to withdraw support for Diệm's government and when the Americans finally reduced aid a few months later, the army took it as a green light for a coup. An inquiry determined that the chemical used in the attack was a liquid component from old French tear gas grenades that had never functioned properly. The findings exonerated the ARVN soldiers from charges that they had used poison or mustard gas. The outcry over the attack had already forced Diệm to appoint a panel of three cabinet ministers to meet with Buddhist leaders for negotiations regarding religious equality. The talks led to the signing of the Joint Communique, but the policy changes it provided were not implemented and widespread protests continued, leading to the assassination of Diệm in a military coup.

== Background ==
South Vietnam was often portrayed as having a Buddhist majority, comprising 70–80% of the population. These figures, reported by foreign journalists, were overestimated, as Westerners commonly mistook folk religion for Buddhism. The actual number of Buddhists was much smaller, at most about 27%. Ngo Dinh Diem was regarded by "orthodox" historians as having pursued pro-Catholic policies that antagonized many Buddhists. The government was regarded as being biased towards Catholics in public service and military promotions, as well as the allocation of land and business favors.

The distribution of firearms to village self-defense militias intended to repel Việt Cộng guerrillas allegedly saw weapons only given to Catholics. The Catholic Church was the largest landowner in the country, and the "private" status that was imposed on Buddhism by the French, which required official permission to conduct public Buddhist activities, was not repealed by Diệm. Allegedly, U.S. aid was disproportionately distributed to Catholic majority villages. Under Diệm, the Catholic Church enjoyed special exemptions in property acquisition, and in 1959, he dedicated the country to the Virgin Mary. The white and gold papal flag was allegedly flown at major public events in South Vietnam. However, portrayals by Western media at the time were severely distorted, as Vietnamese Buddhism in fact flourished under Diệm's First Republic.

The Buddhist flag

On 7 May 1963, government officials invoked a rarely enforced 1958 law known as Decree Number 10 to prohibit the display of religious flags, forbidding Buddhists from flying their flag on Vesak, the birthday of Gautama Buddha. The application of the law caused indignation among Buddhists in the lead-up to the most important religious festival of the year, as Catholics had been allowed to display papal flags a week earlier at a celebration for Diệm's elder brother, Archbishop Ngô Đình Thục. On 8 May, in Huế, a crowd of Buddhists protested against the ban on the Buddhist flag. The police and army broke up the protest by opening fire and throwing grenades at the demonstrators, leaving nine dead.

Diệm's denial of governmental responsibility for the incident, and instead blaming members of the Viet Cong insurgency, led to growing discontent among the Buddhist majority. The incident spurred a protest movement by Buddhists against the religious discrimination of Diệm's Roman Catholic-dominated regime. The dispute came to be known as the Buddhist crisis, and it provoked widespread and large-scale civil disobedience throughout South Vietnam, persisting throughout May. The objective of the protests was to have Decree Number 10 repealed, and to force the implementation of religious equality. At the time, the United States, the main backer of South Vietnam in the Cold War, had 16,000 military advisers in the country to assist the Army of the Republic of Vietnam in the war against the Vietcong insurgency, which sought to reunify Vietnam under communist rule. Washington wanted the dispute with the Buddhists to be resolved quickly so that it would not dampen public morale and detract from the fight against the Vietcong.

== Incident ==
On 3 June, Buddhists held another series of protests across the country. In the morning, attention focused on the capital Saigon, where approximately 500 Buddhist laypeople, mostly youths, protested in front of the Government Delegate's office while 300 troops stood by. The crowd and a government official equipped with a loudspeaker exchanged taunts and accusations. When the official claimed that Vietcong were among the crowd and attempting to cause trouble, the troops aimed their firearms at the protestors.

When the crowd responded by taunting the soldiers as "stupid killers", the troops fixed bayonets to their guns and put on gas masks before charging at the protestors and throwing tear gas grenades at them. Some of the demonstrators ran away, while others remained stationary and began praying. Deaths and injuries were averted when a Buddhist leader urged the protestors to either retreat to a pagoda and receive medical treatment for the tear gas or to go home. When the entrance to the pagoda was blocked with barbed wire, some protestors simply sat on the ground and continued praying. After a standoff lasting almost three hours, troops wearing gas masks forcibly dispersed the crowd. The situation was worse in Huế, where Diệm had banned demonstrations and ordered his forces to arrest those who engaged in civil disobedience. At 13:00, some 1,500 protestors attempted to march towards the Từ Đàm Pagoda in Huế for a rally, having gathered at the Bến Ngự Bridge near the Perfume River. A confrontation ensued when the protestors attempted to cross the bridge. Six waves of ARVN tear gas and attack dogs failed to disperse the crowd.

Government officials stood on trucks, using loudspeakers to call out above the noise, urging the Buddhists—primarily high school and university students who had arrived on bicycles—to disperse. The announcements were met by jeers when the government spokesperson blamed the unrest on the Vietcong. At 18:30, the military personnel at the scene dispersed the crowd by emptying vials of brownish-red liquid on the heads of praying protestors, resulting in 67 Buddhists being hospitalized for chemical injuries. Of these, 40 suffered second-degree burns. The symptoms consisted of severe blistering of the skin and respiratory ailments. The crowd responded angrily to the apparent use of poison gas, and the incident became a public relations disaster for Diệm. Demonstrations also happened in Quang Tri and Nha Trang, also on the central coast area.

== Reaction and investigation ==
By midnight, tensions were high as a curfew and martial law were enacted. Rumors circulated that three people had died, and Newsweek reported that police had lobbed blister gas into the crowd. Reports citing reliable sources claimed that Diệm was planning a military showdown against the Buddhists. The day after the attacks, Diệm installed a new mayor in Da Nang, the largest city in central Vietnam, in a move that was seen as a response to the ongoing protests. Meanwhile, those involved in the protests who had not been taken to hospital retreated into the pagoda and continued to fast. Government authorities responded by placing barbed wire around the compound and cutting off water and electricity. The police prevented anybody from leaving or entering the temple.

US consul John Helble suspected that the ARVN troops had used tear gas, and in a report to the US Embassy, Saigon, he noted that "possibly another type of gas which caused skin blisters" was used. Helble reported that the substance, although unidentified, had raised concerns by the US State Department that poison gas was used because the symptoms were not consistent with standard tear gas.

If this were the case, Helble concluded that the United States should tell Diệm that his regime must condemn the actions of the troops and punish the culprits. If Diệm refused, the United States should threaten to publicly condemn and distance itself from Saigon. With the US also decrying the use of troops against civilian protests, the South Vietnamese government complained that unlike their Saigon counterparts, the Huế police were not trained in riot control. Diệm's authorities requested that the Americans airlift 350 military personnel from Vũng Tàu in the far south to quell the protests in Huế, but the Americans refused. William Trueheart, who was in charge of the US Embassy, Saigon while Ambassador Frederick Nolting was on holiday, confronted Secretary of State Nguyễn Đình Thuần about the allegations of blister gas usage the next day. Thuần appeared to be astounded and asked Trueheart what blister gas was. Trueheart explained that the symptoms of the victims were consistent with those of mustard gas and passed on the US threat to denounce the regime for the chemical attacks. The day after the attacks, there had been press reports that the US Air Force had been used to transport troops of the Airborne Division to Huế, but this was denied two days later by a State Department spokesperson who said that no US aircraft or personnel had been involved in the transport of any Vietnamese servicemen or policemen.

Thuan started an inquiry into the usage of chemical weapons on the protestors. The investigation exonerated the Diệm regime of the most serious allegations of using poison or mustard gas. Before the president was deposed in November, the inquiry's report declared that only tear gas was used, and that the liquid components of the grenades were poured onto the protestors after they had failed to vaporize as they were designed to. A further commission chaired by General Trần Văn Đôn prior to February 1964 concluded that the tear gas was left behind by French colonial forces in the 1950s. The tear gas used came in glass containers in the form of a liquid that was transformed into gaseous vapor upon activation by acid. The injuries were attributed to the acid failing to activate the liquid into gaseous form. United States Army chemists in Maryland confirmed that the tear gas had come from canisters dating back to French World War I stocks. During World War I, France had used tear gas containing a mixture of chloroacetone and ethyl bromoacetate against German troops at Ypres on the Western Front, which was known to strongly irritate mucous membranes.

Chloroacetone turns brown-orange when exposed to light, while ethyl bromoacetate is a yellow liquid at tropical outdoor temperatures. Both have similar colors to the liquid used on the demonstrators. Some varieties of French tear gas contained phosgene oxime or hydrogen cyanide. These two chemicals can be fatal, but none of the protestors in this incident died.

== Repercussions ==
Diệm responded to the controversy of the chemicals by agreeing to formal talks with the Buddhist leaders. He appointed a three-member Interministerial Committee, which comprised Vice President Nguyễn Ngọc Thơ as chairman, Thuan and Interior Minister Bui Van Luong. The first meeting with Buddhist leaders took place two days after the attacks and one of the issues discussed was the temple siege in Hue, and the cessation of protests if religious equality was implemented. Diệm appeared to soften his line, at least in public, in an address on 7 June when he said that some of the tensions were due to his officials lacking "sufficient comprehension and sensitivity" although there was no direct admission of fault regarding any of the violence in Hue since the start of the Buddhist crisis in May. Despite continuing protests, including public self-immolations by monks such as Thich Quang Duc, a Joint Communique resulting from the discussions was signed in mid-June, which promised to end the Buddhist crisis.

The Joint Communique was not implemented and the situation continued to deteriorate, particularly after the Ngô family ordered South Vietnam's Special Forces to attack Buddhist pagodas across the country on 21 August. The U.S. condemned the raids, and began to cut aid to the Special Forces, which was effectively a private Ngô family army, in addition to other government programs that were closely identified with the ruling clan. Regarding such gestures as a green light, and safe in the knowledge that the US would not intervene in Diệm's defense, the army staged a successful coup in November, resulting in the assassination of the president. The removal of Diệm resulted in a period of political instability, as a series of military juntas deposed one another. This led to a deterioration in the military situation as the communist Vietcong made substantial gains against the ARVN, prompting the US to deploy hundreds of thousands of combat troops in 1965, escalating the Vietnam War.
