= Double Seven Day scuffle =

1963 altercation in Saigon, South Vietnam

The aftermath of the altercation. David Halberstam (center, wearing sunglasses) repels plainclothes policemen after their attack on Peter Arnett (far left)

The Double Seven Day Scuffle was a physical altercation on 7 July 1963, in Saigon, South Vietnam. The secret police of Ngô Đình Nhu—the brother of President Ngô Đình Diệm—attacked a group of US journalists who were covering protests held by Buddhists on the ninth anniversary of Diệm's rise to power. Peter Arnett of the Associated Press (AP) was punched on the nose, and the quarrel quickly ended after David Halberstam of The New York Times, being much taller than Nhu's men, counterattacked and caused the secret police to retreat. Arnett and his colleague, the Pulitzer Prize-winning journalist and photographer Malcolm Browne, were later accosted by policemen at their office and taken away for questioning on suspicion of attacking policemen.

After their release, the journalists went to the US embassy in Saigon to complain about their treatment at the hands of Diệm's officials and asked for US government protection. Their appeals were dismissed, as was a direct appeal to the White House. Through the efforts of US Ambassador Frederick Nolting, the assault charges laid against the journalists were subsequently dropped. Vietnamese Buddhists reacted to the incident by contending that Diệm's men were planning to assassinate monks, while Madame Nhu repeated earlier claims that the US government had been trying to overthrow her brother-in-law. Browne took photographs of Arnett's bloodied face, which were published in newspapers worldwide. This drew further negative attention to the behavior of the Diệm régime amidst the backdrop of the Buddhist crisis.

== Background ==
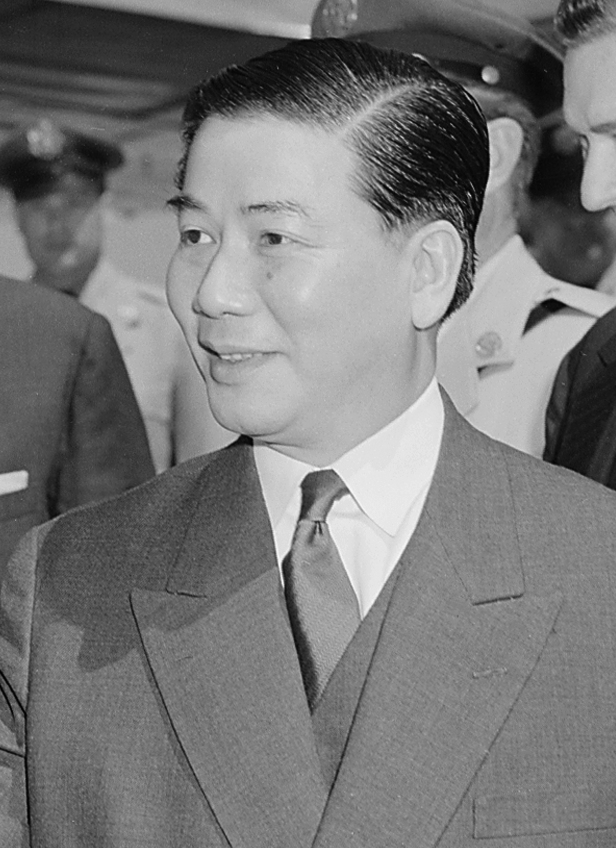
Ngô Đình Diệm

The incident occurred during a period of popular unrest by the Buddhist majority against the Catholic rule of Diệm. Buddhist discontent had grown since the Huế Phật Đản shootings on 8 May 1963. The government decided to selectively invoke a law, prohibiting the display of religious flags, by banning the use of the Buddhist flag on Vesak, the birthday of Gautama Buddha. One week earlier, the Vatican flag had been flown at a celebration for Archbishop Ngô Đình Thục, Diệm's brother. The Buddhists defied the ban, flying their flags on Vesak and holding a demonstration, which was ended with government gunfire and eight or nine deaths. The killings sparked nationwide protests by South Vietnam's Buddhist majority against the policies of Diệm's regime. The Buddhists demanded that Diệm give them religious equality, but with their demands unfulfilled, the protests increased in magnitude. The most notable of these was the self-immolation of Thích Quảng Đức on 11 June, which was iconically photographed by the media and became a negative symbol of the Diệm régime.

Known as Double Seven Day, 7 July was the ninth anniversary of Diệm's 1954 ascension to Prime Minister of the State of Vietnam. In October 1955, following a fraudulent referendum, Diệm established the Republic of Vietnam, generally known as South Vietnam, and declared himself president. The night of 6 July 1963, had started in a festive mood as Diệm awarded decorations to military officers at a ceremony. Among those in the audience were generals Trần Văn Đôn and Dương Văn Minh, the Chief of Staff of the Army of the Republic of Vietnam and the presidential military advisor. They had returned from observing SEATO military exercises in Thailand, where they had been informed about the regional disquiet over Diem's policies towards the Buddhists.

== Incident ==
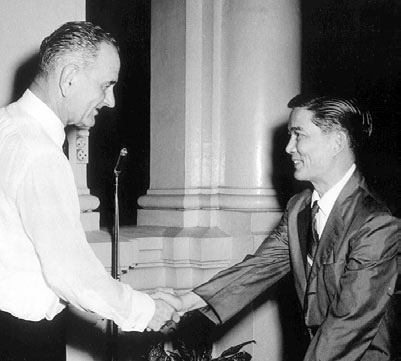
Ngô Đình Nhu controlled South Vietnam's secret police. Here pictured with US vice president Lyndon B. Johnson in 1961

American pressmen had been alerted to an upcoming Buddhist demonstration to coincide with Double Seven Day at Chanatareansey Pagoda in the north of Saigon. The nine-man group, which included Arnett, Browne, AP photographer Horst Faas, David Halberstam, Neil Sheehan of United Press International, CBS's Peter Kalischer and photographer Joseph Masraf waited outside the building with their equipment. After an hour-long religious ceremony, the Buddhist monks, numbering around 300, filed out of the pagoda into a narrow alley along a side street, where they were blocked and ordered to stop by plain-clothed policemen. The Buddhists did not resist, but Arnett and Browne began taking photos of the confrontation. The police, who were loyal to Ngô Đình Nhu, thereupon punched Arnett in the nose, knocked him to the ground, kicked him with their pointed-toe shoes, and broke his camera. Halberstam, who won a Pulitzer Prize for his coverage of the Buddhist crisis, was a tall man, standing around 20 centimetres (8 in) taller than the average Vietnamese policeman. He waded into the fracas swinging his arms, reportedly saying "Get back, get back, you sons of bitches, or I'll beat the shit out of you!" Nhu's men ran away without waiting for a Vietnamese translation, but not before Browne had clambered up a power pole and taken photos of Arnett's bloodied face. The police smashed Browne's camera, but his photographic film survived the impact. The other journalists were jostled and rocks were thrown at them. Photos of Arnett's bloodied face were circulated in US newspapers and caused further ill-feeling towards Diệm's regime, with the images of the burning Thích Quảng Đức on the front pages still fresh in the minds of the public. Halberstam's report estimated that the altercation lasted for around ten minutes and also admitted that the pressmen had tried to apprehend the policeman who had smashed Browne's camera but were shielded by the rock-wielding policeman's colleagues. He also claimed that the secret policemen had also tried to seize equipment from Masraf and Faas.

Diem's address on Double Seven Day worsened the mood of Vietnamese society. He stated that the "problems raised by the General Association of Buddhists have just been settled." He reinforced perceptions that he was out of touch by attributing any lingering problems to the "underground intervention of international red agents and Communist fellow travelers who in collusion with fascist ideologues disguised as democrats were surreptitiously seeking to revive and rekindle disunity at home while arousing public opinions against us abroad". The remark about fascists was seen as a reference to the conspiratorial ĐVQDĐ who had long been enemies of Diem, but his address attacked all those who had criticised him in the past. He no longer trusted anyone outside his family and considered himself to be a martyr.

== Reaction ==
The indignant reporters stridently accused the Diem regime of causing the altercation, whereas the police claimed that the journalists threw the first punch. Embassy official John Mecklin noted that even Diem's media officials were privately skeptical about the veracity of the testimony of Nhu's men. In a heated meeting at the embassy, the press corps demanded that William Trueheart, the acting US Ambassador to South Vietnam in the absence of the vacationing Frederick Nolting, deliver a formal protest to Diem on behalf of the American government. Trueheart angered them by refusing to do so and blaming both sides for the confrontation. He said that he did not believe a formal protest was possible given that it could not be proven that the violence was pre-meditated but claimed to believe the journalists' version of events. He also noted that Vietnamese officials had claimed that incident was simply a matter of "a few people lost their heads". In his report to Washington, Trueheart asserted that the uniformed policemen had tacitly helped their plainclothed counterparts, but he also had "no doubt that [the] reporters, at least once [the] fracas had started, acted in [a] belligerent manner towards [the] police". Trueheart contended that since the journalists had a long history of bad blood with the Diem regime, their word could not be taken over that of the Vietnamese police.

Later on the same day, the US State Department released a statement in Washington DC, announcing that the Saigon Embassy had informally complained to and asked Diem's regime for an explanation regarding the incident, and said that officials were studying various accounts of the incident and that it was American policy to look out for the interests of their citizens regardless of their background or occupation.

Since the embassy was unwilling to provide government protection against police aggression, the journalists appealed directly to the White House. Browne, Halberstam, Sheehan and Kalischer wrote a letter to US President John F. Kennedy, asserting that the regime had begun a full-scale campaign of "open physical intimidation to prevent the covering of news which we feel Americans have a right to know", which was noted by the press secretary Pierre Salinger.

The protests did not garner any Presidential sympathy for the journalists, but instead resulted in trouble from their media employers. UPI's Tokyo office criticised Sheehan for trying to "make Unipress policy" on his own when "Unipress must be neutral, neither pro-Diem, pro-Communist or pro-anybody else". Emanuel Freedman, the foreign editor of The New York Times reprimanded Halberstam, writing "We still feel that our correspondents should not be firing off cables to the President of the United States without authorisation".

The incident provoked reactions from both the Buddhists and the Diem regime. A monk called on the US embassy to send a military unit from the American advisors already present in Vietnam to Xá Lợi Pagoda, the main Buddhist temple in Saigon and the organisational hub of the Buddhist movement. The monk claimed that the attack on Arnett indicated that Xá Lợi's monks were targets of assassination by Nhu's men, something that Trueheart rejected, turning down the protection request. Xá Lợi and other Buddhist centers across the country were raided a month later by Special Forces under the direct control of the Diem family. On the part of the South Vietnamese government, the de facto first lady Madame Nhu used her English-language mouthpiece newspaper, the Times of Vietnam, to accuse the United States of supporting the failed coup attempt against Diem in 1960.

== Arrest and interrogation ==
Later on during the day of the altercation, the police collected Browne and Arnett from the AP bureau in Saigon and took the pair to what they described as a "safe house". The police interrogators said that they would be arrested but were unspecific about the charges. One charge was that of assaulting two police officers, but the interrogators hinted that more serious offences such as organising illegal demonstrations were being considered. The officers conversed among themselves in French, a language which the reporters did not speak, but Arnett thought that they mentioned the word espionage. After four hours of questioning, the pair were charged with assault. Browne and Arnett in turn filed charges against the police over the altercation, and demanded compensation for the damage to their photographic equipment. Arnett and Browne were temporarily released in the evening, after which the whole Saigon press corps stormed the US embassy.

Browne and Arnett were called in for five hours of questioning on the following day. Arnett was accompanied by a British embassy official who, reflecting Arnett's New Zealand citizenship, provided consular assistance on behalf of Wellington. In the end, Diem agreed to have the charges against Browne and Arnett dropped after hours of heated argument with US Ambassador Frederick Nolting, who had returned from his vacation.
