= Huế Phật Đản shootings =

1963 shootings in South Vietnam

Coordinates: 16°28′02″N 107°35′25″E

- Part of the Buddhist crisis
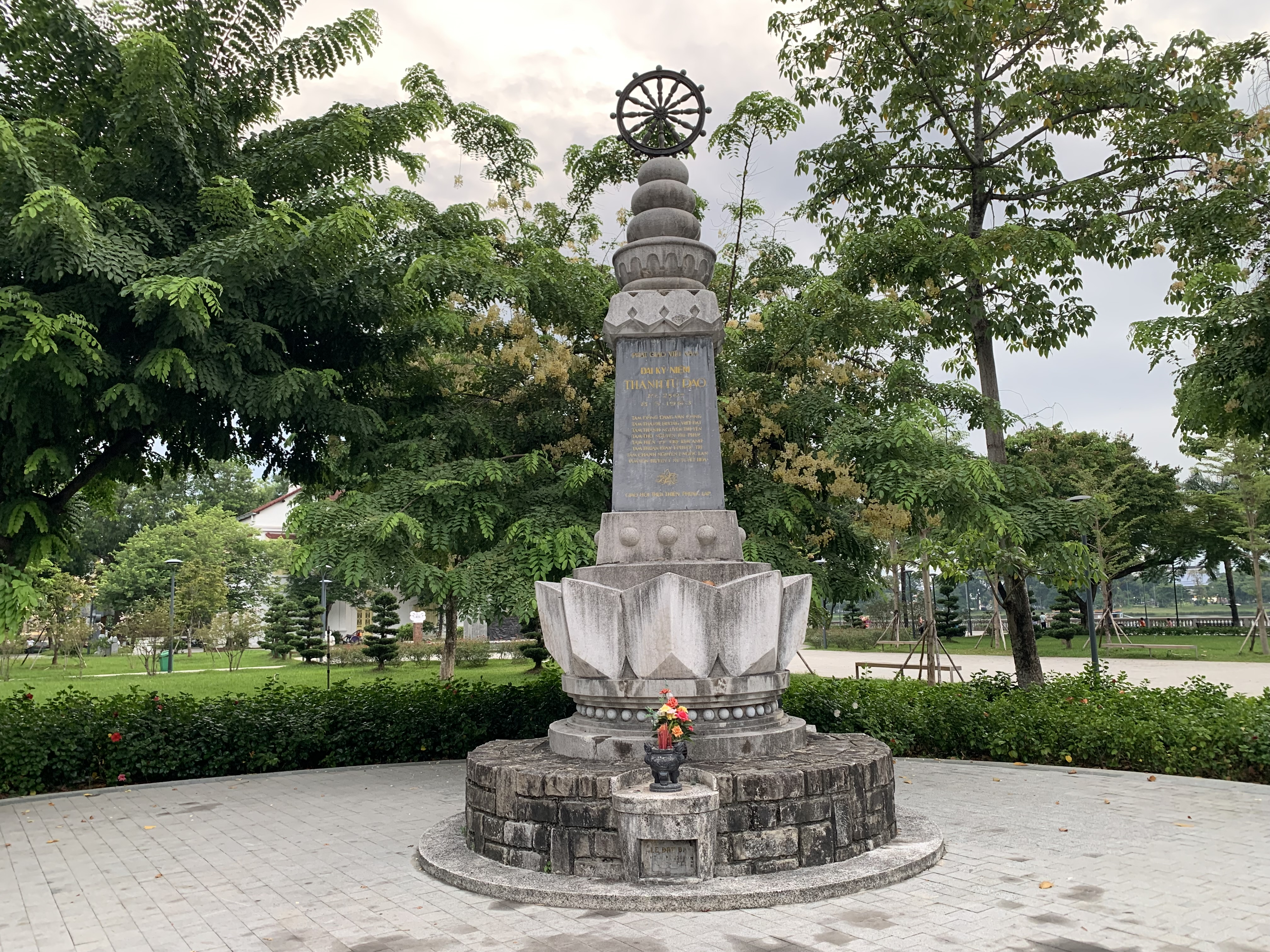
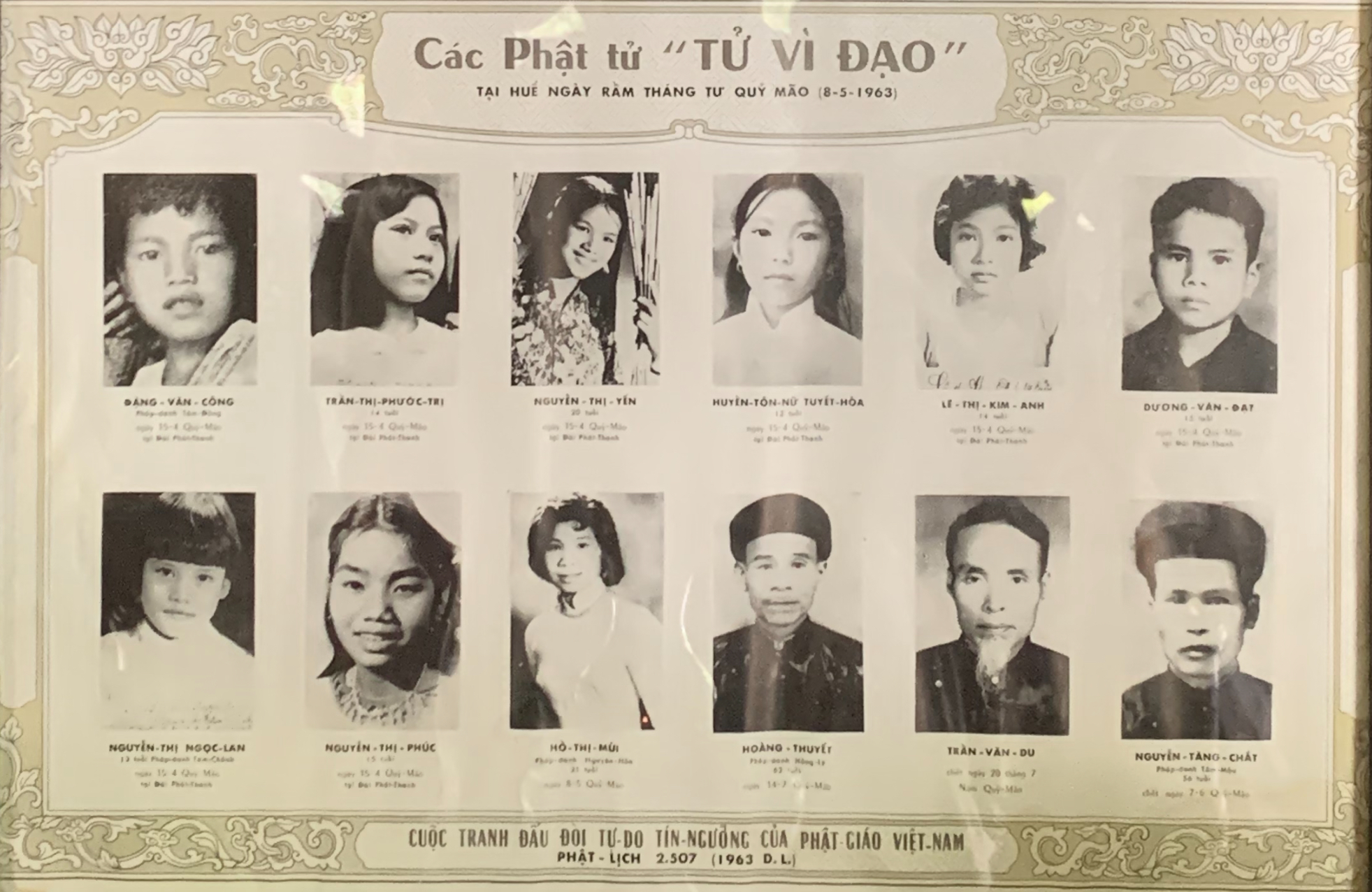
- A memorial to the victim of the incident near the Trường Tiền Bridge, Huế (top); Images of the victims to the shootings on an altar in Từ Hiếu Temple, Huế (bottom)
- Location: Huế, South Vietnam
- Date: 8 May 1963
- Target: Buddhists and protesters
- Attack type: Massacre, war crimes
- Deaths: 9
- Injuries: 4
- Perpetrators: Army of the Republic of Vietnam and security forces

On 8 May 1963, nine unarmed Buddhist civilians were shot by the Army of the Republic of Vietnam and security forces in Huế, South Vietnam. The army and police fired guns and launched grenades into a crowd of Buddhists who had been protesting against a government ban on flying the Buddhist flag on the day of Phật Đản, which commemorates the birth of Gautama Buddha.

Ngô Đình Diệm, the president of South Vietnam, denied governmental responsibility for the incident and blamed the Việt Cộng, which added to discontent among the Buddhist majority. The incident spurred a protest movement by Buddhists against the religious discrimination perpetrated by the largely Catholic Diệm regime, known as the "Buddhist crisis", which led to widespread civil disobedience among South Vietnamese.

After six months of tension and growing opposition to the regime, leaders of the army, supported by the CIA, conducted a coup on 1 November 1963, including the arrest and assassination of Ngo Dinh Diem the following day.

== Background ==
South Vietnam was often portrayed as having a Buddhist majority, comprising 70–80% of the population. These figures, reported by foreign journalists, were overestimated, as Westerners commonly mistook folk religion for Buddhism. The actual number of Buddhists was much smaller, at most about 27%. Ngo Dinh Diem was regarded by "orthodox" historians as having pursued pro-Catholic policies that antagonized many Buddhists. The government was regarded as being biased towards Catholics in public service and military promotions, as well as the allocation of land and business favors.

The distribution of firearms to village self-defense militias intended to repel Việt Cộng guerrillas allegedly saw weapons only given to Catholics. The "private" status that was imposed on Buddhism by the French, which required official permission to conduct public Buddhist activities, was not repealed by Diệm. Allegedly, U.S. aid was disproportionately distributed to Catholic majority villages. Under Diệm, the Catholic Church enjoyed special exemptions in property acquisition, and in 1959, he dedicated the country to the Virgin Mary. The white and gold Catholic flag was allegedly flown at major public events in South Vietnam. However, portrayals by Western media at the time were severely distorted, as Vietnamese Buddhism in fact flourished under Diệm's First Republic.

The Buddhist flag

A rarely enforced 1958 law known as "Decree Number 10" was invoked on 7 May 1963 to prohibit the display of religious flags. This disallowed the flying of Buddhist flags on Phật Đản, the birthday of Gautama Buddha. The invoking official was the deputy province chief in charge of security, Major Đặng Sỹ, a Catholic who was charged with maintaining public security and was commander of the Huế garrison. The application of the law caused indignation among Buddhists on the eve of the most important religious festival of the year, since a week earlier Catholics had been allowed to display papal flags to celebrate the 25th anniversary of the appointment of Diệm's brother, Thục, as Archbishop of Huế. The celebrations had been bankrolled by Diệm's regime through a national committee which asked the population to donate money to Thục's jubilee. Buddhists complained that they had been forced to give a month's wages to pay for the celebration. However, Diệm invoked the flag decree because he was annoyed with the commemoration for Thục. In spite of this, the authorities in Huế tore down thousands of Buddhist flags that had already been unfurled on homes and pagodas in preparation for Phật Đản. The origin of the order to enforce the law on the Buddhists of Huế has been attributed to Thục. Despite protestations from the Saigon representative to the central provinces, the order was enacted upon consultation with Saigon. The designation of Buddhism as an "association" prevented it from acquiring land for the construction of pagodas.

== Protest and shootings ==
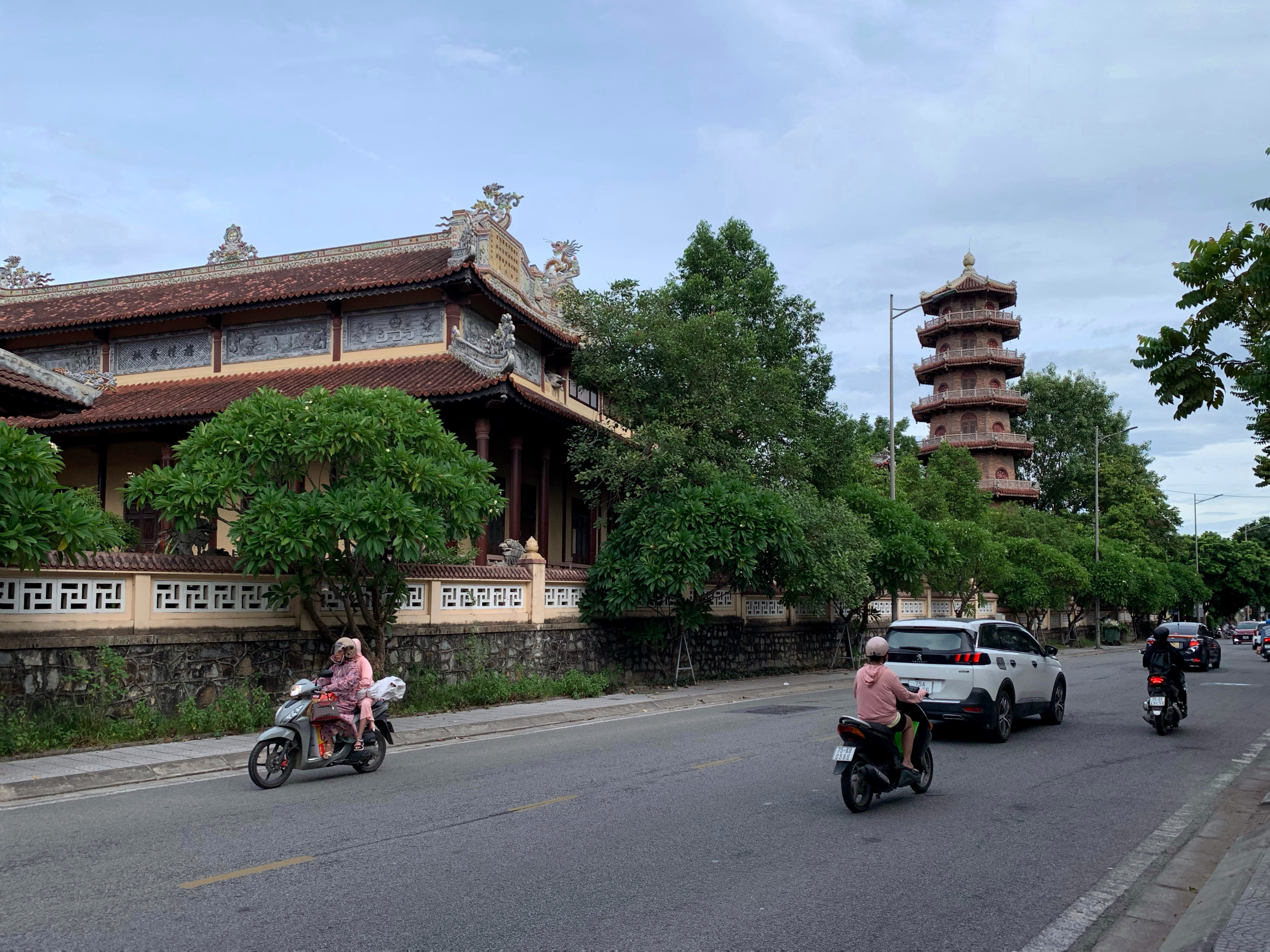
Từ Đàm Pagoda, the site of initial congregation

On Phật Đản, thousands of Buddhists defied the ban on flag-flying. More than 500 people marched across the Perfume River, carrying signs and placards, congregating at the Từ Đàm Pagoda before a 3,000-strong demonstration, calling for religious equality, took place in the city centre as government security officials surrounded the area with armoured personnel carriers and civil guardsmen. The signs were in English, to convey the message to Western observers, and in Vietnamese. The leading Buddhist activist monk Thích Trí Quang addressed the crowd and exhorted them to rise up against Catholic discrimination against Buddhism. He called the Buddhists to congregate outside the government radio station in the evening for a rally. Tension increased throughout the day with demonstrators chanting and displaying anti-government slogans as the crowd grew. They expected to hear another speech from Thích Trí Quang, but the speech was withdrawn from broadcast by the government censor. The armed forces were called in to disperse the discontented crowd. After two explosions shook the ground, the crowd thought that the troops had resorted to using bombs. Major Sỹ reportedly fired into the air, and his men responded by launching grenades into the crowd as firehoses were unleashed on the demonstrators. His troops fired directly into the crowd. Nine were killed and four severely injured. Two of the dead, both children, had been crushed underneath armored personnel carriers. Some of the nine had been mutilated and decapitated.

== Government reaction ==
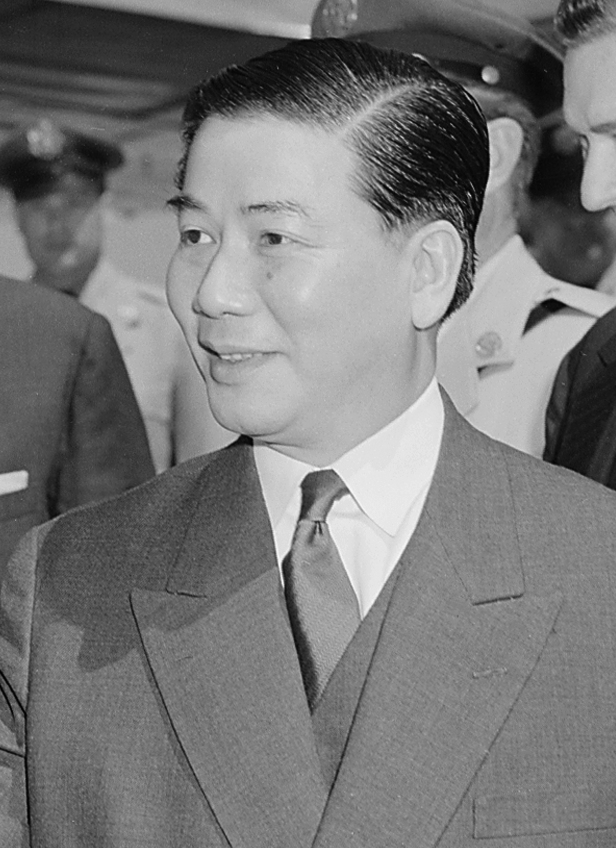
Ngô Đình Diệm

Diệm and his government alleged that a Việt Cộng guerrilla had caused the incident by setting off the initial explosion, sparking a stampede. He initially refused to take any disciplinary action against the local authorities, claiming that they had acted properly. The government claimed that only percussion grenades had been used, not lethal fragmentation grenades. The force of the explosion cast doubt on whether the Việt Cộng would have had access to sufficiently powerful explosives. Another theory at the time was that a CIA agent had caused the blasts with the aim of fomenting sectarian tension and destabilising the Diệm regime. Eyewitness testimony of government troops firing on the crowd disputed the official version of events. A local doctor concluded that there was no evidence of the fatal injuries being inflicted by plastic explosives; he was subsequently jailed. Diệm refused to be swayed from his account of the incident, and ordered the bodies of the victims to be buried without autopsy. Thích Trí Quang spent the night riding through the streets of Huế with a loudspeaker, accusing the government of firing on the demonstrators. U.S. Ambassador Frederick Nolting, known for his policy of appeasement of Diệm, attempted to spread the responsibility. He claimed all parties were responsible, the demonstrators for (as he alleged) trying to take over the radio station, the government for deploying the army, which later opened fire, and "agitators" for throwing the explosives. When the government later ignored his version and refused to assign responsibility, Nolting called its actions "objective, accurate and fair".

== Buddhist reaction and protests ==
At 11:00 am on 9 May, Major Sỹ announced to nearly 800 youthful pro-Buddhist demonstrators that "oppositionist agitators" had forced troops to take the severe measures to maintain order in the face of Việt Cộng agitation. The protesters showed their anger at such an improbable explanation by marching around the old citadel quarter of Huế, chanting anti-Catholic and anti-Diệm slogans. A government-organised counter-demonstration to condemn the "Việtcộng terrorist act" under the leadership of Diệm's brother, Ngô Đình Nhu, attracted almost nobody. Thích Trí Quang, who had traveled throughout the country protesting against religious inequality and the flag ban, began rallying Buddhists in central Vietnam. He called on them to attend a public mass funeral for the Huế victims scheduled for 10 May. Such an emotion-charged spectacle would likely have attracted thousands of spectators and placed pressure on Diệm's regime to grant reforms, so the government announced a curfew and put all armed personnel on duty around the clock to "prevent VC infiltration". A confrontation was averted when Thích Trí Quang persuaded the protesters to lay down their flags and slogans and observe the 9:00 pm curfew. The following day, tensions increased again as a crowd of around 6,000 Buddhists attended Tu Dam Pagoda for the funerals and a series of meetings. Major Sỹ was present with ARVN troops and armed police. Slogans and speeches calling for religious equality and anti-government sentiment were prevalent. Thích Trí Quang called on Buddhists to use unarmed struggle and follow Gandhian principles, saying "Carry no weapons; be prepared to die ... follow Gandhi's policies". After Sỹ echoed Buddhist calls for compensation and expressed sorrow for the victims, the meeting dissolved without violence.

== Buddhist demands for equality ==
On 10 May, Thích Trí Quang proclaimed a five-point "manifesto of the monks" that demanded freedom to fly the Buddhist flag, religious equality between Buddhists and Catholics, compensation for the victims' families, an end to arbitrary arrests, and punishment for the officials responsible.

On 13 May, a committee of Buddhist monks formalized their request to Diệm for the five demands. Although the signatories had couched the declaration as "requests", they had expectations that these would be met. On 15 May, a delegation of six monks and two laymen met Diệm to present the document. After the meeting, the monks held a press conference at the Xá Lợi Pagoda. It was to be the first of many in which they attempted to publicise their cause to the foreign press corps. Diệm agreed to meet with a Buddhist delegation, but increased tension further by demeaning them. Initially, Diệm refused to pay compensation, believing it was a sign of weakness. He claimed there was no discrimination in South Vietnam and that all religions had been treated equally with respect to the flag issue. In regard to the classification of Buddhism as an "association" under Decree 10, Diệm claimed it was an "administrative oversight" that would be fixed (although no action was taken on the matter during his final six months of office); Diệm labeled the Buddhists "damn fools" for demanding something that according to him, they already enjoyed. The government press release detailing the meeting also used the expression "damn fools".

As the demonstrations continued, Ambassador Nolting managed to extract theoretical concessions from Diệm on 18 May. Diệm agreed a modest compensation package of US$7000 for the families of the victims as a conciliatory gesture. Diệm also agreed to dismiss those responsible for the shootings. However, the publicly stated reason for this action was that the officials had failed to maintain order, rather than that they had been responsible for the deaths of the protesters. Despite these concessions, Diệm maintained that his government was not responsible for the deaths, resolutely continuing to blame the Việt Cộng. It was enough to satisfy Nolting, who immediately departed for his vacation. His absence allowed the remaining American diplomatic staff led by William Trueheart, Nolting's deputy, to end Nolting's policy of appeasing Diệm.

== Trial ==
After the fall of the Diệm regime in a coup on 1 November 1963, Đặng Sỹ faced a trial held under a government led by Nguyễn Khánh. Some of the accusations were that Sỹ's men had fired on the crowd and crushed the victims with armored cars, or that the grenades had been launched at his orders and caused the deaths. Sỹ later reportedly revealed that Archbishop Thục had personally given him the order to shoot the Buddhists but refused to testify against Thục, who was by that time living in exile in Rome. Sỹ was sentenced to life imprisonment and ordered to compensate the victims' families. His lawyer contended that the court had been unable to establish the nature and source of the lethal explosions. The defense minister, General Trần Thiện Khiêm, a Catholic who had helped Khánh in his January 1964 coup, later claimed Khánh had rigged the trial to gain Quang's support, and released Sỹ from prison; Sỹ later emigrated to the United States. In 1970, the Saigon-based Catholic newspaper Hòa Bình ran a story claiming that CIA agents had used a secret new explosive to foment trouble for Diệm's regime, whose relations with the United States were deteriorating.

== See also ==
- Double Seven Day scuffle
- Huế chemical attacks
- Thich Quang Duc
- Xa Loi Pagoda raids
