= Joint Communiqué =

Joint Communiqué, a public statement issued following meetings between diplomatic entities, and agreed to by all parties, may specifically refer to:

- Japan–China Joint Communiqué, a 1972 agreement
- Joint Communiqué (Vietnam), the 1963 South Vietnamese agreement during the Buddhist crisis
- July 4 South–North Joint Statement, a 1972 agreement between North and South Korea
- Three Communiqués, a collection of three joint statements made between China and the United States
  - Shanghai Communiqué, the first of the collection (1972)
  - Joint Communiqué on the Establishment of Diplomatic Relations, the second of the collection (1979)
