= Ellen Hammer =

American historian

Ellen Joy Hammer (September 17, 1921 – January 28, 2001) was an American historian who specialized in 20th-century Vietnamese history.

== Biography ==
Born in New York City, the daughter of David and Rea (Welt) Hammer, she received a bachelor's degree from Barnard College in 1941 and worked for a few years on the research staff of the Council on Foreign Relations in Manhattan. She earned a doctorate in public law and government from Columbia University, where she specialized in international relations. She became known in the early 1950s for her work on colonial rule in French Indochina. She was regarded as one of the first Americans to become scholars of Vietnamese history, often traveling to the Asian country for extended periods.

Her first book, The Struggle for Indochina, published in 1954, was regarded as a pioneering text for that period of history. Douglas Pike, a historian and director of research at the Vietnam Center at Texas Tech University, said that as a scholar Hammer was "one of the few Americans that got into Vietnam before the American buildup there" in the mid-1960s. It follows the history of French Indochina from 1940 to 1955, documenting the Japanese takeover of the French colony during the Second World War and the subsequent struggle between the communist Vietminh and the French Union between 1946 and 1954, which resulted in the independence and partition of Vietnam at the 17th parallel as a result of the Geneva Conference.

A Death in November: America in Vietnam, 1963 was published in 1987, and Thomas Omestad wrote in a New York Times Book Review, "The title of this carefully researched book refers to the death of Ngo Dinh Diem, president of South Vietnam from 1955 to 1963, and that of his brother and adviser, Ngo Dinh Nhu." The book incorporated a variety of classified American government cables detailing the American involvement in the downfall of Diem. It documents the events leading up to the 1963 South Vietnamese coup in November, which saw the Arrest and assassination of Ngô Đình Diệm, the first President of South Vietnam, and follows the downfall of the Diem regime amid mass protests following the Hue Vesak shootings, in which nine Buddhists were shot dead by government forces while protesting a ban on the Buddhist flag. The book documents the unfolding Buddhist crisis, covering events such as the self-immolation of Thich Quang Duc, the Xa Loi Pagoda raids and the United States' maneuvering amid the crisis.

Hammer was regarded by Pike as being "very loyal personally to Diem" and being "bitter" about his demise. After the fall of Diem, she moved to France and vowed to stay away from the subject. Despite this, she still wrote A Death in November. She died of lymphoma in 2001 in New York City.
