= Joint Communiqué (Vietnam) =

1963 South Vietnamese agreement with Buddhists

The Joint Communiqué was an agreement signed on 16 June 1963 between the South Vietnamese government of Ngô Đình Diệm and the Buddhist leadership during the Buddhist crisis.

== Background ==
South Vietnam's Buddhist majority had long been discontented with the rule of President Ngô Đình Diệm since his rise to power in 1955. Diem had shown strong favouritism towards his fellow Catholics and discrimination against Buddhists in the army, public service and distribution of government aid. In the countryside, Catholics were de facto exempt from performing corvée labour and in some rural areas, Catholic priests led private armies against Buddhist villages. Discontent with Diệm exploded into mass protest in Huế during the summer of 1963 when nine Buddhists died at the hand of Diem's army and police on Vesak, the birthday of Gautama Buddha. In May 1963, a law against the flying of religious flags was selectively invoked; the Buddhist flag was banned from display on Vesak while the Vatican flag was displayed to celebrate the anniversary of the consecration of Pierre Martin Ngô Đình Thục, Archbishop of Huế, Diệm's elder brother. The Buddhists defied the ban and a protest that began with a march starting from the Từ Đàm Pagoda to the government broadcasting station was ended when government forces opened fire, killing nine people.

Diệm and his government alleged that the Việt Cộng was responsible and refused to take any disciplinary action against the local authorities. Eyewitness testimony of government troops firing on the crowd disputed the official version of events. Diệm refused to be swayed from his account of the incident, and ordered the bodies of the victims to be buried without autopsy. U.S. Ambassador Frederick Nolting, known for his policy of appeasement of Diệm, attempted to spread the responsibility. He claimed all parties were responsible, the demonstrators for (as he alleged) trying to take over the radio station, the government for deploying the army, which later opened fire, and "agitators" for throwing the explosives. When the government later ignored his version and refused to assign responsibility, Nolting called its actions "objective, accurate and fair."

Buddhist leader Thích Trí Quang, who had traveled throughout the country protesting against religious inequality and the flag ban, began rallying Buddhists in central Vietnam. He called them to attend a public mass funeral for the Huế victims scheduled for 10 May. As a result, Buddhist protests were held across the country and steadily grew in size, asking for the signing of a Joint Communique to end religious inequality. The pagodas were major organizing points for the Buddhist movement, and often the location of hunger strikes, barricades and protests. Thích Trí Quang proclaimed a five-point "manifesto of the monks" that demanded freedom to fly the Buddhist flag, religious equality between Buddhists and Catholics, compensation for the victims' families, an end to arbitrary arrests, and punishment for the officials responsible. Diệm agreed to meet with a Buddhist delegation, but increased tension further by demeaning them. Initially, Diệm refused to pay compensation, believing it was a sign of weakness. He claimed there was no discrimination in South Vietnam and that all religions had been treated equally with respect to the flag issue. In regard to the classification of Buddhism as an "association" under Decree 10, Diệm claimed it was an "administrative oversight" that would be fixed (although no action was taken on the matter during his final six months of office); Diệm labeled the Buddhists "damn fools" for demanding something that according to him, they already enjoyed. The government press release detailing the meeting also used the expression "damn fools".

== Negotiations ==
As Diệm stalled and attempted to brush off Buddhist demands as the protests escalated, the self-immolation of the Buddhist monk Thích Quảng Đức generated worldwide headlines and increase international pressure on Diem. He reluctantly ordered his government committee to resume negotiations with the Buddhist leadership. These became more high profile with the arrival of Thích Trí Quang and patriarch Thích Tịnh Khiết from Huế to negotiate with Diệm's committee. With no immediate upsurge in demonstrations following the self-immolation, Diệm assumed that the Buddhists were out of ideas. Diệm took the Buddhists' initiation of negotiations to be an expression of weakness.

Acting U.S. Ambassador William Trueheart warned that without meaningful concessions, the US would publicly repudiate his regime. Diệm said that such a move would scupper the negotiations. After a delay of one day due to the need of the frail eighty-year-old Thích Tịnh Khiết to rest from the long journey south; Diệm's committee met with the Buddhists on 14 June. Buddhists pushed for revocation of the stipulation that only local officials could authorise flag displays. Pagodas had been regarded as communal property of the hamlets for centuries and the Buddhists insisted that they be put under religious administration. The Buddhists lobbied for Diệm to immediately amend Decree Number 10 by Presidential Decree as allowed in the constitution, rather than wait for the National Assembly to do so. The National Assembly had announced a committee would be established on 12 June to deal with the issue. Trueheart recommended that the Interministerial Committee accept the Buddhist's position in a "spirit of amity" and then clarify the details at a later point.

During the negotiations, Thích Tịnh Khiết issued a nationwide plea to urge Buddhists to avoid any actions that could endanger the talks while Diệm ordered government officials to remove all barriers around the temples. By the end of the evening, substantial progress on the issues of the flags and Decree Number 10 had been announced.

== Agreement ==
On 16 June, an agreement between the committee and the Buddhists was reached. An agreement had been reached pertaining to all five demands, although the terms were vague. Diệm claimed it contained nothing that he had not already accepted. The "Joint Communique" asserted that the national flag "should always be respected and be put at its appropriate place". The National Assembly would consult with religious groups in an effort to remove them "from the regulations of Ordinance No. 10" and to establish new guidelines appropriate to their religious activities. In the meantime the government committee promised a loose application of the regulation. It also promised leniency in the censorship of Buddhist literature and prayer books and the granting of permits to construct Buddhist pagodas, schools and charitable institutions.

Both sides agreed to form an investigative committee to "re-examine" the Buddhist grievances and Diệm agreed to grant a full amnesty to all Buddhists who had protested against the government. The agreement stated the "normal and purely religious activity" could go unhindered without the need for government permission in pagodas or the headquarters of the General Association of Buddhists. Diệm promised an inquiry into the Huế shootings and punishment for any found guilty, although it denied government involvement. In an attempt to save face, Diệm signed the agreement directly under a paragraph declaring that "the articles written in this joint communiqué have been approved in principle by me from the beginning", which he added with his own handwriting, thereby implying that he had nothing to concede. The Communique was also signed by the members of the committee: Tho, Thuan and Luong as well as the members of the Buddhist delegation.

A palace informant reported that the signing of the agreement had split the Ngo family. Madame Nhu, the sister-in-law of Diệm and de facto First Lady, reportedly attacked Diệm for cowardice. She reputedly called him a "jellyfish" for agreeing to negotiate with the Buddhists, noting that he had militarily crushed the private armies of the Cao Đài and Hòa Hảo sects and the Bình Xuyên organized crime gang in 1955, and a coup attempt in 1960.

The joint communiqué was presented to the press on 16 June and Thích Tịnh Khiết thanked Diệm and exhorted the Buddhist community to work with the government in what he optimistically predicted would be a new era of religious harmony. He expressed his "conviction that the joint communiqué will inaugurate a new era and that ... no erroneous action from whatever quarter will occur again." He declared that the protest movement was over, and called on Buddhists to return to their normal lives and pray for the success of the agreement. However, the younger monks were disappointed with the result of the negotiations feeling that Diem's regime had not been made accountable. Thich Duc Nghiep said that "When I tell some of the other priests what has been signed they will be very angry".

Trueheart was skeptical about its implementation, noting "If we find Diệm in a mood to freeze up, rather than move forward, then I think his days are numbered and we must begin to make moves." The troubles had become a public relations issue for Diem beyond his country, with speculation about a US-Diệm rift being discussed in American newspapers following the self-immolation. The New York Times ran a front page headline on 14 June, citing leaked government information that diplomats had privately attacked Diem's handling of the crisis. It also reported that General Paul Harkins, the head of the US advisory mission in South Vietnam to order his men not to assist ARVN units that were taking action against demonstrators. The US at the time considered telling Vice President Tho that they would support him replacing Diem as President. This occurred at the time as the surfacing of rumours that South Vietnamese air force Chief of Staff Lieutenant Colonel Đỗ Khắc Mai had begun gauging support among his colleagues for a coup.

== Failure ==
The communiqué was put in doubt by an incident outside Xá Lợi Pagoda the following day, shortly after 9:00 a.m. A crowd of around 2000 people were confronted by police who still persisted in ringing the pagoda in spite of the agreement. A riot eventually broke out and police attacked the crowd with tear gas, fire hoses, clubs and gunfire. One protester was killed and scores more injured. Moderates from both sides urged calm while some government officials blamed "extremist elements". An Associated Press story described the riot as "the most violent anti-Government outburst in South Vietnam in years".

The agreement would only be meaningful if it was put into action, regardless of Thich Tinh Khiet's announcement to his disciples that it heralded a new era. This required the monks to return to their normal lives and government and its officials to implement its promises. Many protesters arrested in the past remained in jail contrary to the communiqué's promises. After the deadly riot occurred only a day after the signing of the communique, the crisis steepened as more Buddhists began calling for a change of government and younger monks such as Thích Trí Quang began to come to the forefront, blaming Diệm for discontent that was hindering the effort against the Vietcong. Due to the failure of the agreement to produce the desired results, the older and more senior monks, who were more moderate, saw their prestige diminished, and the younger, more assertive monks began to take a more prominent role in Buddhist politics.

Buddhists were suspicious of the government and began to step up the production of critical pamphlets and began translating articles critical of Diệm in the western media to distribute to Vietnamese. As the promises continued to fail to be materialised, the demonstrations at Xá Lợi and elsewhere continued to grow.

Thich Tinh Khiet sent Diệm a letter after the funeral of Thích Quảng Đức, noting the government was not observing the communiqué and that the condition of Buddhists in South Vietnam had deteriorated. Tho denied the allegation, and Nhu told a reporter: "If anyone is oppressed in this affair, it is the government which has been constantly attacked and whose mouth has been shut with Scotch tape." He criticised the agreements through his Republican Youth organization, calling on the population to "resist the indirections [sic] of superstition and fanaticism" and warned against "communists who may abuse the Joint Communique". At the same time, Nhu issued a secret memorandum to the Republican Youth, calling on them to lobby the government to reject the agreement, and calling the Buddhists "rebels" and "communists". Nhu continued to disparage the Buddhists through his English-language mouthpiece, the Times of Vietnam, whose editorial bent was usually taken to be the Ngô family's own personal opinions.

A U.S. State Department report concluded that the religious disquiet was not fomented by communist elements but that communists were "waiting expectantly in the wings for a propitious moment to capitalize on developments". In the meantime the government had quietly informed local officials that the agreements were a "tactical retreat" to buy time before decisive putting down the Buddhist movement. Diệm's regime stalled on implementing the release of Buddhists who had been imprisoned for protesting against it. This led to a discussion within the US government to push for the removal of the Nhus, who were regarded as the extremist influence over Diệm, from power. Henry Cabot Lodge Jr. was also announced as the new US ambassador effective in late August, replacing Nolting, who had been considered too close to Diệm.

In July, Diệm's government continued to attack the Buddhists. It accused Thích Quảng Đức of having been drugged before being set alight. Tho speculated that the Vietcong had infiltrated the Buddhists and converted them into a political organisation with Interior Minister Luong alleged that cabinet ministers had received death threats.

The Buddhists were becoming increasingly skeptical about the government intentions. They had received information that suggested that the agreement was just a government tactic to buy time and wait for the popular anger to die down, before Diệm would arrest the leading Buddhist monks.
