= Nguyễn Đình Thuần =

Vietnamese politician (1923–2013)

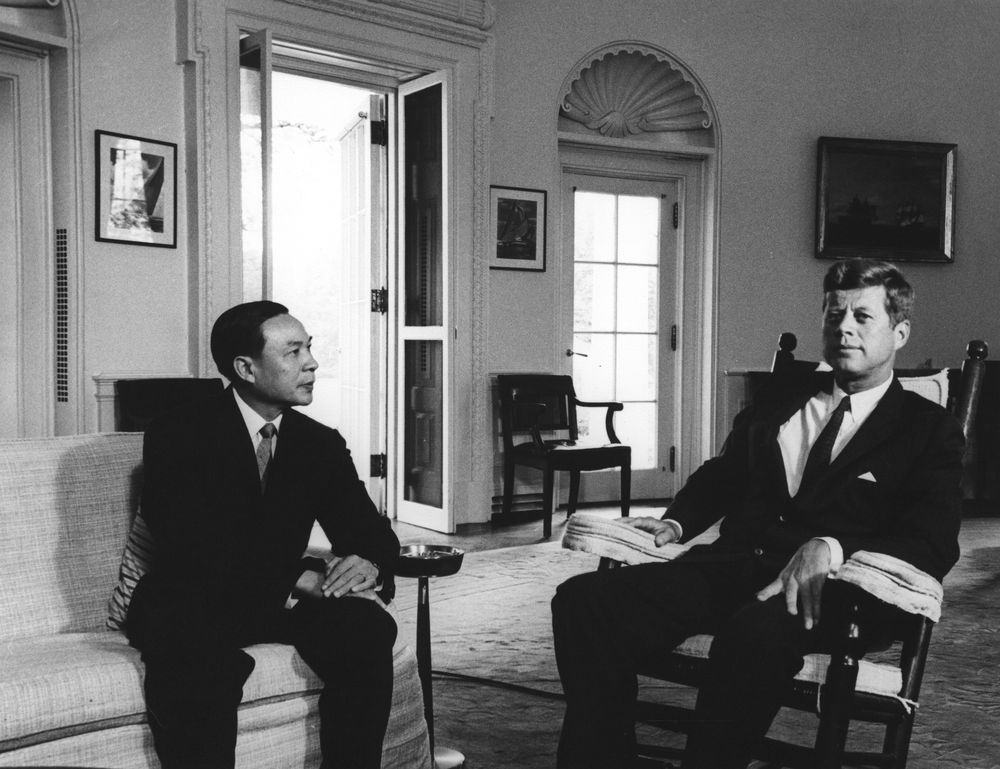
- Nguyễn Đình Thuần talking to John F. Kennedy

Personal details
- Born: June 5, 1923 Hưng Yên Province, French Indochina
- Died: June 3, 2013 (aged 89) Boulogne-Billancourt, France
- Resting place: Père Lachaise Cemetery

Nguyễn Đình Thuần (June 5, 1923 – June 3, 2013) was the Secretary of State under President Ngô Đình Diệm of South Vietnam. After Ngô Đình Diệm was overthrown and assassinated in the 1963 South Vietnamese coup, Nguyễn Đình Thuần moved to France to live with his brother.

Initially, Thuần worked as a journalist writing with Trần Trung Dung during their days in Hanoi. In 1955, President Ngô Đình Diệm appointed Trần Trung Dung to the position of Assistant Minister of National Defense, and he was also promoted to the position of General Manager of the Office under Mr. Dung. On 18 October 1960, Trần Trung Dung resigned as Assistant Minister of National Defense and Thuần was appointed to replace his predecessor.

Thuần died in 2013 in Boulogne-Billancourt.
