= Buddhist crisis =

1963 political and religious tension in South Vietnam

- Part of the Vietnam War, the Vietnamese Buddhist revival, and the decline of the Dharma
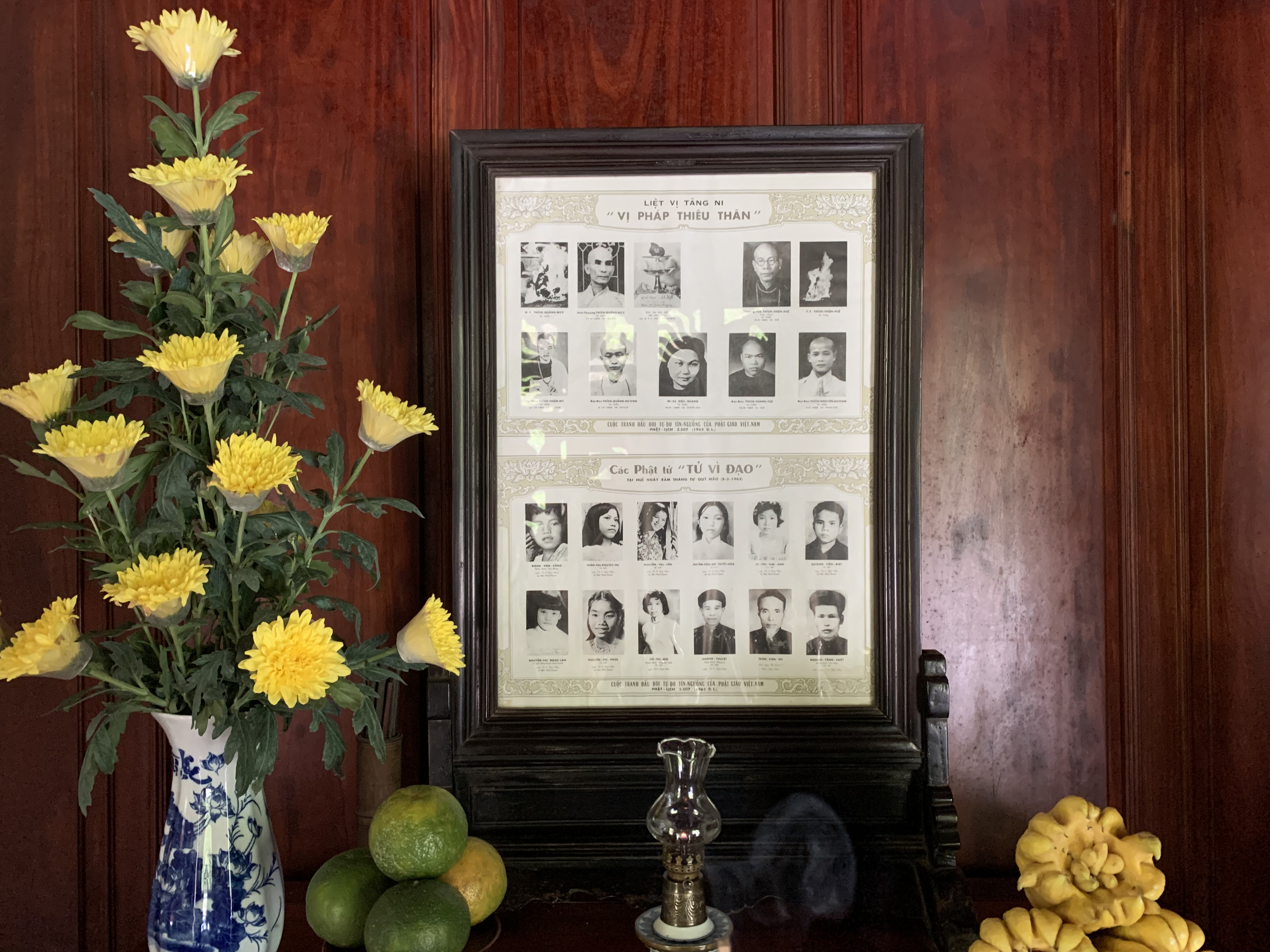
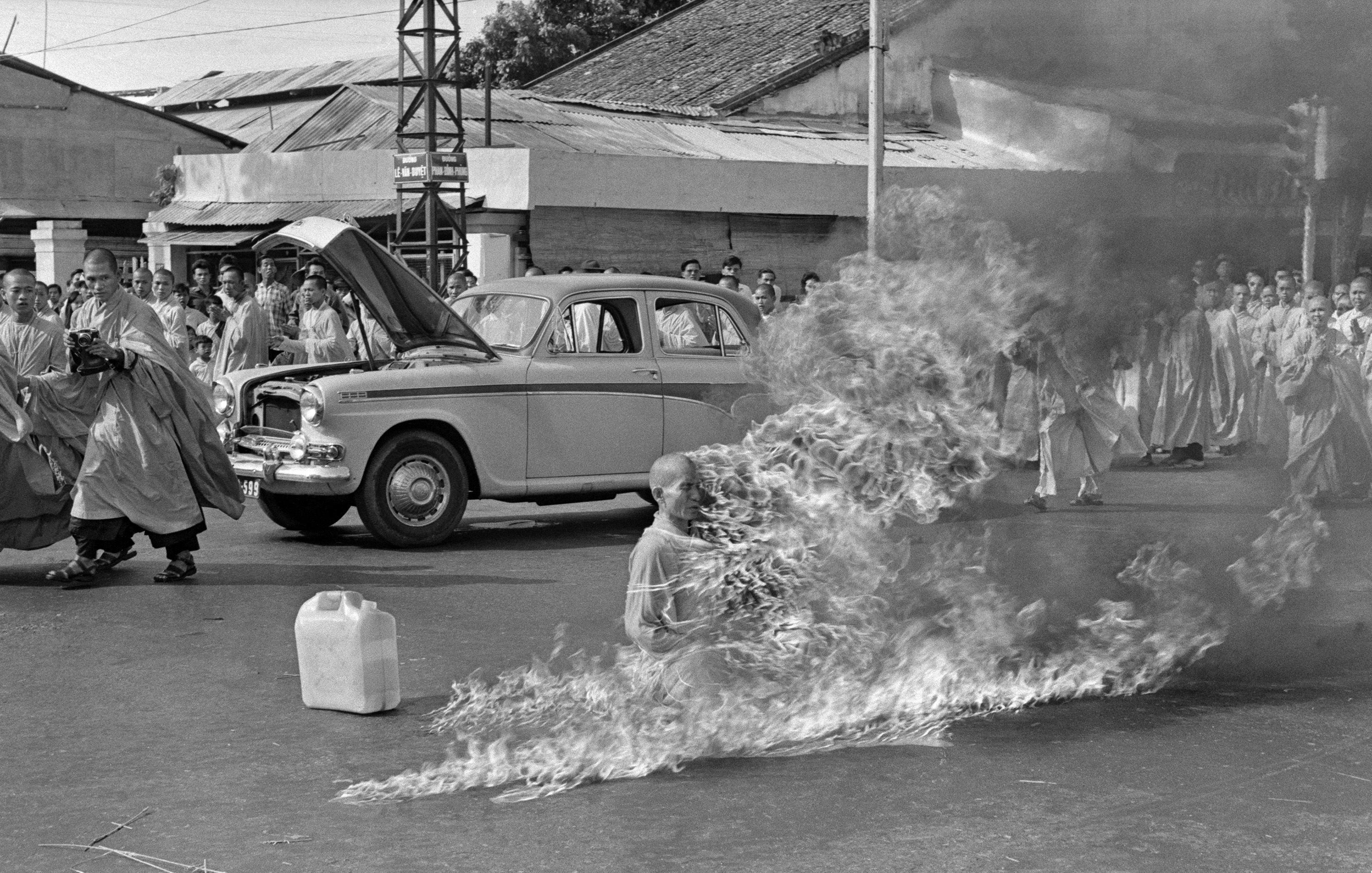
- Altar to the Buddhist victims of the 1963 turmoil at Từ Hiếu Pagoda, Huế (top); Thích Quảng Đức's self-immolation (bottom)
- Date: May 8 – November 2, 1963 (5 months, 3 weeks and 4 days)
- Location: South Vietnam
- Result: Repression of Buddhist activists; 1963 South Vietnamese coup d'état and death of Ngô Đình Diệm

Parties
South Vietnamese Buddhists	(South Vietnam) South Vietnamese government: Army Special Forces; Archdiocese of Huế

Lead figures
Thích Trí Quang; Thích Thiện Minh; Thích Quảng Đức †; Thích Tịnh Khiết; Thích Tâm Châu	(South Vietnam) Ngô Đình Diệm X (South Vietnam) Ngô Đình Nhu X (South Vietnam) Madame Nhu (South Vietnam) Ngô Đình Cẩn; Lê Quang Tung (executed); Ngô Đình Thục

Casualties and losses
Hundreds killed in the Xa Loi Pagoda raids, 8–9 killed in the Hue Phat Dan shootings, At least 1 self-immolation, 9 ARVN rebels and 20 civilians killed in coup that ended the crisis	5 ARVN members killed in coup

The Buddhist crisis (Vietnamese: Biến cố Phật giáo) was a period of political and religious tension in South Vietnam between May and November 1963, characterized by a series of repressive acts by the South Vietnamese government and a campaign of civil resistance, led mainly by Buddhist activists.

The crisis was precipitated by the shootings of nine unarmed civilians on May 8 in the central city of Huế who were protesting against a ban of the Buddhist flag. The crisis ended with a coup d'état by the Army of the Republic of Vietnam (ARVN) on November 1, 1963, and the arrest and assassination of President Ngô Đình Diệm the following day.

== Background ==
South Vietnam was often portrayed as having a Buddhist majority, comprising 70% or more of the population. These figures, reported by foreign journalists, were overestimated, as Westerners commonly mistook folk religion for Buddhism. The religious landscape was also far more intricate and fragmented, as Buddhists had long been divided by sect, geography, and political affiliation. The actual number of Buddhists was likely much smaller, with three to four million among a population of 15 million, or at most 27%.

During the First Indochina War, Buddhists faced a dilemma between Ho Chi Minh's repressive yet independent Democratic Republic of Vietnam (DRV) and the religiously freer but French-associated State of Vietnam (SVN). Many Buddhists subsequently rejected the radical policies and revolutionary violence of the communist-led DRV, and instead chose to live under the SVN; among these were believers who would later participate in the 1963 Buddhist movement. Buddhists largely regarded the Republic of Vietnam (South Vietnam) as a fully independent regime and welcomed the US advisory presence as beneficial to their country. Under Ngô Đình Diệm's government, the General Buddhist Association expanded, but relations between the government and Buddhists in middle Vietnam deteriorated in the early 1960s, particularly following the promotion of the zealous Ngô Đình Thục, Diệm's brother, to Archbishop of Huế. As a Catholic, President Diệm's perceived pro-Catholic policies, such as allegedly tending to favor Catholics over Buddhists by granting them lands, business favors, and job promotions, antagonized many Buddhists.

According to The New Republic, the distribution of firearms to village self-defense militias intended to repel Viet Cong insurgency was done so that weapons were given only to Catholics. The "private" status that was imposed on Buddhism by the French, which required official permission to conduct public activities, was not repealed by Diệm. Under Diệm, the Catholic Church received special exemptions in property acquisition, and in 1959, Diệm dedicated the country to the Virgin Mary. Catholic flags were regularly flown at major public events in South Vietnam.

== Events ==
=== May 1963 ===
A rarely enforced 1958 law—known as Decree Number 10—was invoked in May 1963 to prohibit the display of religious flags. This disallowed the flying of the Buddhist flag on Vesak, the birthday of Gautama Buddha. The application of the law caused indignation among Buddhists on the eve of the most important religious festival of the year, as a week earlier Catholics had been encouraged to display Vatican flags at a government-sponsored celebration for Diệm's brother, Archbishop Ngô Đình Thục, the most senior Catholic cleric in the country. On May 8, in Huế, a crowd of Buddhists protested against the ban on the Buddhist flag. The police and army broke up the demonstration by firing guns at and throwing grenades into the gathering, leaving nine dead.

In response to the shootings in Huế, Buddhist leader Thích Trí Quang proclaimed a five-point "manifesto of the monks" that demanded freedom to fly the Buddhist flag, religious equality between Buddhists and Catholics, compensation for the victims' families, an end to arbitrary arrests, and punishment of the officials responsible. The request was formalized on May 13, and talks began on May 15.

Diệm denied governmental responsibility for the incident. Instead, he blamed the VC for the event. Diệm's Secretary of State Nguyen Dinh Thuan accused the VC of exploiting Buddhist unrest and declared that Diệm could not make concessions without fueling further demands. The Vietnam Press, a pro-Diệm newspaper, published a government declaration confirming the existence of religious freedom and emphasizing the supremacy of the country's flag. Diệm's National Assembly affirmed this statement, but this did not placate the Buddhists. In one meeting, Diệm labeled the Buddhists "damn fools" for demanding something that according to him, they already enjoyed. The government press release detailing the meeting also used the expression "damn fools". On May 18, Diệm agreed a modest compensation package of US$7000 for the families of the victims of the shootings in Huế. Diệm also agreed to dismiss those responsible for the shootings, but on the grounds that the officials had failed to maintain order, rather than any responsibility for the deaths of the protesters. He resolutely continued to blame the VC.

On May 30, more than 500 monks demonstrated in front of the National Assembly in Saigon. The Buddhists had evaded a ban on public assembly by hiring four buses, packing them with monks, and closing the blinds. They drove around the city until the convoy stopped at the designated time and the monks disembarked. This was the first time an open protest had been held in Saigon against Diệm in his eight years of rule. They unfurled banners and sat down for four hours before disbanding and returning to the pagodas to begin a nationwide 48-hour hunger strike organized by the Buddhist patriarch Thich Tinh Khiet.

=== June 1963 ===
On June 1, Diệm's authorities dismissed the three major officials involved in the Huế incident: the provincial chief and his deputy, and the government delegate for the Central Region of Vietnam. The stated reason was that they had failed to maintain order. By this time, the situation appeared to be beyond reconciliation.

On June 3, amid nationwide protests in Saigon and other cities, Vietnamese police and ARVN troops poured chemicals on the heads of praying Buddhist protestors in Huế outside Từ Đàm Pagoda. Sixty-seven people were hospitalized and the United States privately threatened to withdraw aid.

Diệm responded to the controversy of the chemical attacks by agreeing to formal talks with the Buddhist leaders. He appointed a three-member Interministerial Committee, which included Vice President Nguyễn Ngọc Thơ as chairman, Thuan, and Interior Minister Bui Van Luong. The first meeting with Buddhist leaders took place two days after the attacks and one of the issues discussed was the standoff in Huế, and the cessation of protests if religious equality was implemented. Diệm appeared to soften his line, at least in public, in an address on June 7 when he said that some of the tensions were due to his officials lacking "sufficient comprehension and sensitivity" although there was no direct admission of fault regarding any of the violence in Huế since the start of the Buddhist crisis.

On June 11, Buddhist monk Thích Quảng Đức burned himself to death at a busy Saigon road intersection in protest against Diệm's policies.

In response to Buddhist self-immolation as a form of protest, Madame Nhu—the de facto First Lady of South Vietnam at the time (and the wife of Ngô Đình Nhu, who was the brother and chief advisor to Diệm)—said "Let them burn and we shall clap our hands", and "if the Buddhists wish to have another barbecue, I will be glad to supply the gasoline and a match."

Acting US Ambassador William Trueheart warned that without meaningful concessions, the US would publicly repudiate Diệm's regime. Diệm said that such a move would scupper the negotiations. On June 14, Diệm's committee met with the Buddhists, who lobbied for Diệm to immediately amend Decree Number 10 by presidential decree as allowed in the constitution, rather than wait for the National Assembly to do so. The National Assembly had announced a committee would be established on June 12 to deal with the issue. Trueheart recommended that the Interministerial Committee accept the Buddhist's position in a "spirit of amity" and then clarify the details at a later point. During the negotiations, Thích Tịnh Khiết issued a nationwide plea to urge Buddhists to avoid any actions that could endanger the talks while Diệm ordered government officials to remove all barriers around the temples.

On June 16, the committee and the Buddhists reached an agreement pertaining to all five demands, although the terms were vague. Diệm claimed it contained nothing that he had not already accepted. The "Joint Communiqué" asserted that the national flag "should always be respected and be put at its appropriate place". The National Assembly would consult with religious groups in an effort to remove them "from the regulations of Ordinance No. 10" and to establish new guidelines appropriate to their religious activities. In the meantime the government committee promised a loose application of the regulation. It also promised leniency in the censorship of Buddhist literature and prayer books and the granting of permits to construct Buddhist pagodas, schools and charitable institutions.

Both sides agreed to form an investigative committee to "re-examine" the Buddhist grievances and Diệm agreed to grant a full amnesty to all Buddhists who had protested against the government. The agreement stated the "normal and purely religious activity" could go unhindered without the need for government permission in pagodas or the headquarters of the General Association of Buddhists. Diệm promised an inquiry into the Huế shootings and punishment for any found guilty, although it denied government involvement. In an attempt to save face, Diệm signed the agreement directly under a paragraph declaring that "the articles written in this joint communiqué have been approved in principle by me from the beginning", which he added with his own handwriting, thereby implying that he had nothing to concede.

The Joint Communiqué was presented to the press on June 16 and Thích Tịnh Khiết thanked Diệm and exhorted the Buddhist community to work with the government. He expressed his "conviction that the joint communiqué will inaugurate a new era and that ... no erroneous action from whatever quarter will occur again." He declared that the protest movement was over, and called on Buddhists to return to their normal lives and pray for the success of the agreement. However, some younger monks were disappointed with the result of the negotiations feeling that Diệm's regime had not been made accountable.

Trueheart was skeptical about its implementation, privately reporting that if Diệm did not follow through, the US should look for alternative leadership options. The troubles had become a public relations issue for Diệm beyond his country, with speculation about a US-Diệm rift being discussed in American newspapers following the self-immolation. The New York Times ran a front page headline on June 14, citing leaked government information that diplomats had privately attacked Diệm. It also reported that General Paul Harkins, the head of the US advisory mission in South Vietnam, ordered his men not to assist ARVN units that were taking action against demonstrators. The US at the time considered telling Vice President Tho that they would support him replacing Diệm as President. This occurred at the same time as the surfacing of rumours that Republic of Vietnam Air Force Chief of Staff Lieutenant Colonel Đỗ Khắc Mai had begun gauging support among his colleagues for a coup.

The agreement was put in doubt by an incident outside Xá Lợi Pagoda the following day. A crowd of around 2,000 people were confronted by police who persisted in ringing the pagoda despite the agreement. A riot eventually broke out and police attacked the crowd with tear gas, fire hoses, clubs, and gunfire. One protester was killed and scores more injured. Moderates from both sides urged calm while some government officials blamed "extremist elements". An Associated Press story described the riot as "the most violent anti-Government outburst in South Vietnam in years". Furthermore, many protesters remained in jail contrary to the terms of the Joint Communique. The crisis deepened as more Buddhists began calling for a change of government and younger monks such as Thích Trí Quang came to the forefront, blaming Diệm for the ongoing impasse. Due to the failure of the agreement to produce the desired results, older and more senior monks, who were more moderate, saw their prestige diminished, and the younger, more assertive monks began to take on a more prominent role in Buddhist politics.

Thich Tinh Khiet sent Diệm a letter after the funeral of Thích Quảng Đức, noting the government was not observing the agreement and that the condition of Buddhists in South Vietnam had deteriorated. Tho denied the allegation, and Ngô Đình Nhu told a reporter: "If anyone is oppressed in this affair, it is the government which has been constantly attacked and whose mouth has been shut with Scotch tape." He criticised the agreements through his Republican Youth organization, calling on the population to "resist the indirections [sic] of superstition and fanaticism" and warned against "communists who may abuse the Joint Communique". At the same time, Nhu issued a secret memorandum to the Republican Youth, calling on them to lobby the government to reject the agreement, and calling the Buddhists "rebels" and "communists". Nhu continued to disparage the Buddhists through his English-language mouthpiece, the Times of Vietnam, whose editorial bent was usually taken to be the Ngô family's own personal opinions.

A US State Department report concluded that the religious disquiet was not fomented by communist elements. In the meantime the government had quietly informed local officials that the agreements were a "tactical retreat" to buy time before decisively putting down the Buddhist movement. Diệm's regime stalled on implementing the release of Buddhists who had been imprisoned for protesting against it. This led to a discussion within the US government to push for the removal of the Nhus, who were regarded as the extremist influence over Diệm, from power.

The Buddhists were becoming increasingly skeptical of government intentions. They had received information that suggested that the agreement was just a governmental tactic to buy time and wait for the popular anger to die down, before Diệm would arrest the leading Buddhist monks. They began to step up the production of critical pamphlets and began translating articles critical of Diệm in the Western media to distribute to the public. As promises continued to fail to materialise, the demonstrations at Xá Lợi and elsewhere continued to grow.

=== July 1963 ===
In July, Diệm's government continued to attack the Buddhists. It accused Thích Quảng Đức of having been drugged before being set alight. Tho speculated that the VC had infiltrated the Buddhists and converted them into a political organization. Interior Minister Luong alleged that cabinet ministers had received death threats. Henry Cabot Lodge Jr. was announced as the new US ambassador effective in late August, replacing Frederick Nolting, who was considered too close to Diệm.

On July 7, 1963, the secret police of Ngô Đình Nhu attacked a group of journalists from the United States who were covering Buddhist protests on the ninth anniversary of Diệm's rise to power. Peter Arnett of the Associated Press (AP) was punched in the nose, but the quarrel quickly ended after David Halberstam of The New York Times, being much taller than Nhu's men, counterattacked and caused the secret police to retreat. Arnett and his colleague, the Pulitzer Prize-winning journalist and photographer Malcolm Browne, were later accosted by police at their office and taken away for questioning on suspicion of attacking police officers. In the end, Diệm agreed to have the charges against Browne and Arnett dropped after intervention from the US Embassy.

On the same day, Diệm publicly claimed that the "problems raised by the General Association of Buddhists have just been settled." He reinforced perceptions that he was out of touch by attributing any lingering problems to the "underground intervention of international red agents and Communist fellow travelers who in collusion with fascist ideologues disguised as democrats were surreptitiously seeking to revive and rekindle disunity at home while arousing public opinions against us abroad."

=== August 1963 ===
On Sunday, August 18, the Buddhists staged a mass protest at Xá Lợi Pagoda, Saigon's largest, attracting around 15,000 people, undeterred by rain. The attendance was approximately three times higher than that at the previous Sunday's rally. The event lasted for several hours, as speeches by the monks interspersed religious ceremonies. A Vietnamese journalist said that it was the only emotional public gathering in South Vietnam since Diệm's rise to power almost a decade earlier. David Halberstam of The New York Times speculated that by not exploiting the large crowd by staging a protest march towards Gia Long Palace or other government buildings, the Buddhists were saving their biggest demonstration for the scheduled arrival of new US ambassador, Henry Cabot Lodge Jr., the following week. As a government attack on Xa Loi was anticipated, Halberstam concluded that the Buddhists were playing "a fast and dangerous game". He wrote that "the Buddhists themselves appeared to be at least as much aware of all the developments, and their protest seemed to have a mounting intensity".

On the evening of August 18, ten senior ARVN generals met to discuss the situation and decided that martial law needed to be imposed. On August 20, Nhu summoned seven of the generals to Gia Long Palace for consultation. They presented their request to impose martial law and discussed dispersion of the monks. Nhu sent the generals to see Diệm. The president listened to the group of seven, led by General Trần Văn Đôn. Đôn claimed that communists had infiltrated the monks at Xá Lợi Pagoda and warned that ARVN morale was deteriorating because of the civil unrest. He claimed that it was possible that the Buddhists could assemble a crowd to march on Gia Long Palace. Hearing this, Diệm agreed to declare martial law effective the next day, without consulting his cabinet. Troops were ordered into Saigon to occupy strategic points. Đôn was appointed as the acting Chief of the Armed Forces in the place of General Lê Văn Tỵ, who was abroad having medical treatment. Đôn noted that Diệm was apparently concerned with the welfare of the monks, telling the generals that he did not want any of them hurt. The martial law orders were authorized with the signature of Đôn, who had no idea that military action was to occur in the early hours of August 21 without his knowledge.

Shortly after midnight on August 21, on the instructions of Nhu, ARVN Special Forces troops under Colonel Lê Quang Tung executed a series of synchronized attacks on the Buddhist pagodas in South Vietnam. Over 1400 Buddhists were arrested. The number killed or "disappeared" is estimated to be in the hundreds. The most prominent of the pagodas raided was that of Xá Lợi, which had become the rallying point for Buddhists from the countryside. The troops vandalized the main altar and managed to confiscate the intact charred heart of Thích Quảng Đức, the monk who had self-immolated in protest against the policies of the regime. The Buddhists managed to escape with a receptacle holding the remainder of his ashes. Two monks jumped the back wall of the pagoda into the grounds of the adjoining US Aid Mission, where they were given asylum. Thich Tinh Khiet, the 80-year-old Buddhist patriarch, was seized and taken to a military hospital on the outskirts of Saigon. The commander of the ARVN III Corps, General Tôn Thất Đính announced military control over Saigon, canceling all commercial flights into the city and instituting press censorship.

Once the US government realized the truth about who was behind the raids, they reacted with disapproval towards the Diệm regime. The US had pursued a policy of quietly and privately advising the Ngos to reconcile with the Buddhists while publicly supporting the alliance, but following the attacks, this route was regarded as untenable. Furthermore, the attacks were carried out by US-trained Special Forces personnel funded by the CIA, and presented incoming Ambassador Henry Cabot Lodge Jr., with a fait accompli. The state department issued a statement declaring that the raids were a "direct violation" of the promise to pursue "a policy of reconciliation".

On August 24, the Kennedy administration sent Cable 243 to Lodge at the embassy in Saigon, marking a change in US policy. The message advised Lodge to seek the removal of Nhu from power, and to look for alternative leadership options if Diệm refused to heed American pressure for reform. As the probability of Diệm's sidelining Nhu and his wife was seen as virtually nil, the message effectively meant the fomenting of a coup. The Voice of America also broadcast a statement blaming Nhu for the raids and absolving the army of responsibility.

On August 30, Pope Paul VI voiced deep concern about the conflicts, describing them as "sad events that afflict the beloved people of Vietnam," while expressing solidarity with the people of Vietnam in the daily newspaper of Vatican City, L'Osservatore Romano.

=== September 1963 ===
After the events of August, Diệm's regime became a major preoccupation of the Kennedy administration and a fact-finding mission was launched. The stated purpose of the expedition was to investigate the progress of the war by South Vietnam and their US military advisers against the VC insurgency. The Krulak Mendenhall mission was led by Victor Krulak and Joseph Mendenhall. Krulak was a major general in the United States Marine Corps, while Mendenhall was a senior foreign service officer experienced in dealing with Vietnamese affairs. The trip lasted four days.

In their submissions to the United States National Security Council (NSC), Krulak presented an extremely optimistic report on the progress of the war, while Mendenhall presented a very bleak picture of military failure and public discontent. Krulak disregarded the effects of popular discontent in combating the Viet Cong. The general felt that the Vietnamese soldiers' efforts in the field would not be affected by the public's unease with Diệm's policies. Mendenhall focused on gauging the sentiment of urban-based Vietnamese and concluded that Diệm's policies increased the possibility of religious civil war. Mendenhall said that Diệm's policies were causing the South Vietnamese to believe that life under the VC would improve the quality of their lives.

The divergent reports led US President John F. Kennedy to famously ask his two advisers, "The two of you did visit the same country, didn't you?"

The inconclusive report was the subject of bitter and personal debate among Kennedy's senior advisers. Various courses of action towards Vietnam were discussed, such as fostering a regime change or taking a series of selective measures designed to cripple the influence of the Nhus, who were seen as the major causes of the political problems in South Vietnam.

The disparate reports of Krulak and Mendenhall resulted in a follow-up mission, the McNamara–Taylor mission.

=== November 1963 ===
On November 1, 1963, after six months of tension and growing opposition to the regime, ARVN generals executed a coup, which led to arrest and assassination of Ngô Đình Diệm the next day.

== Historiography ==
Scholarship on the Buddhist crisis presents multiple interpretations. Some view it as a genuine struggle for religious freedom against Diệm's anti-Buddhist policies. Others contend that leaders exaggerated claims of persecution to attain political dominance, as the militant Buddhists deliberately sought to subvert every government in power from 1963 to 1966.

The Diệm government always denied any accusations of repression against Buddhists and presented these self-immolations and riots as the result of infiltration by communist guerrillas disguised as monks. Some South Vietnamese authors supported this infiltration thesis, which then allowed American and North Vietnamese propaganda to widely exploit these troubles with the aim of destabilizing and defaming the South Vietnamese government. Thus, police searches allowed the South Vietnamese government to discover the presence of weapons of war in certain pagodas, leading to the closure of 12 of them. Another perspective sees the movement as rooted in Vietnamese religious traditions, with leaders resisting rapid modernization or opposing the escalating war.

Historian Edward Miller, however, situates the crisis within the Vietnamese Buddhist revival, which aimed to restore Buddhism's historical role in the nation while modernizing Vietnam. This movement clashed with Diệm's Personalist Revolution, an abstruse form of communitarianism that blended Mounier's personalism with contemporary Vietnamese discourse among others. The conflict thus reflected a collision between competing visions of modern Vietnamese nationalism and was part of a broader, multi-sided struggle over nation-building, involving both domestic groups and foreign actors like the United States. According to historian Jerema Słowiak, Diệm's favoritism towards certain Catholics was not a sign of corruption and nepotism, but that it was necessary for Diệm to favor people loyal towards him, given the precarious internal situation of Vietnam.

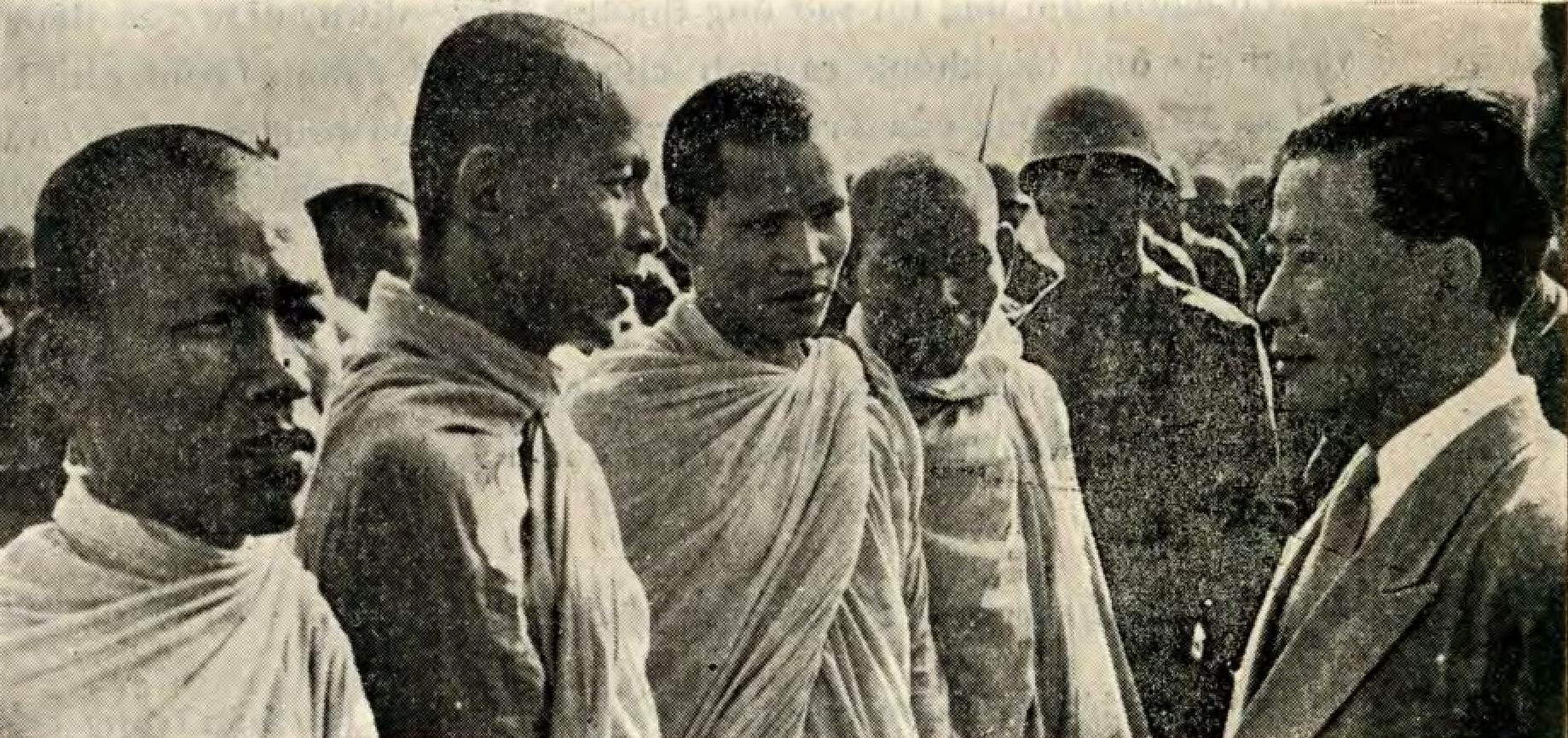
Diem talks with monks, 1955

Portrayals by Western media at the time were severely distorted yet consequential. A 1963 United Nations investigation indicated that Buddhists had not been systematically oppressed by the South Vietnamese government. Furthermore, according to historian Mark Moyar, President Ngô Đình Diệm pursued public policies that favored the Buddhist community in South Vietnam, by granting them licenses to conduct religious activities that had been banned by the former French colonial government, and by sponsoring the construction of Buddhist schools, holding ceremonies, and building new pagodas. Of South Vietnam's 4,766 pagodas, 1,275 were built during Diệm's rule, with many receiving government financial support. Of Diệm's eighteen cabinet members, five were Catholics, five were Confucianists, and eight were Buddhists, including Vice President Nguyễn Ngọc Thơ and Foreign Minister Vũ Văn Mẫu. Only three of the nineteen senior military officials were Catholics.

Diệm supported the General Buddhist Association of Vietnam in constructing its large new headquarters in downtown Saigon, known as Xá Lợi Pagoda. The government also funded the renovation of other pagodas, including Từ Đàm Temple in Huế. Both of these pagodas later became centers of anti-government protest activities during the 1963 crisis. Historian Phi-Vân Nguyen argues that the Republic of Vietnam's Personalist Revolution offered a framework for religious freedom and diversity as a counter to communism's atheism. This approach, while intending to strengthen anticommunist nationalism, inadvertently amplified religious consciousness, particularly among Buddhist activists. Enabled by the state's recognition of their religious rights, these activists leveraged their position to challenge the very authority that had granted them such freedoms.

Historian Nu-Anh Tran also situates the 1963 Buddhist activism within the Vietnamese Buddhist revival. Buddhists articulated a form of religious nationalism that linked the vitality of the Buddhist faith to the prosperity of the nation. During Diệm's rule, religious groups enjoyed far greater freedom than opposition political parties, and Buddhist organizations increased in size and influence. By the early 1960s, however, there were reports of abuses of power by some Catholics that Diệm failed to curb, although there is no evidence that he favored forced conversions. Nepotism and isolated incidents of persecution led many Buddhists to fear that Diệm secretly sought to convert the entire population and undermine their Buddhist nationalism. Activists portrayed Buddhists as courageous nationalists who had fought both Western colonialism and communism, while implicitly accusing Diệm of perpetuating colonial-era religious discrimination and thus preventing Vietnam from achieving full decolonization. The perceived existential threat drove the Buddhist movement to become extreme, with self-immolation coming to be viewed as a method of nonviolent resistance.

The abrupt end to the crisis with the ousting of Diệm transformed the politics of South Vietnam. By the end of the 20th century, approximately one hundred Vietnamese Buddhists had chosen to die by fire in protest against various South Vietnamese administrations, the war, and later the postwar communist regime. The 1963 crisis also left a troubling legacy, as it was followed by a Vietnam that was far removed from the peaceful, just, and unified nation Buddhists had envisioned.

== See also ==
- Buddhist uprising in 1966
- Buddhist protest in Huế 1993
