= Thích Trí Quang =

Vietnamese Buddhist monk

- Thích Trí Quang in 1966
- Born: 21 December 1923; Diêm Điền village, Quảng Bình, French Indochina
- Died: 8 November 2019 (aged 95); Huế, Thừa Thiên-Huế, Vietnam

Thích Trí Quang (chữ Hán: 釋智光) (21 December 1923 – 8 November 2019) was a Vietnamese Mahayana Buddhist monk best known for his role in leading South Vietnam's Buddhist population during the Buddhist crisis in 1963, and in later Buddhist protests against subsequent South Vietnamese military regimes until the Buddhist Uprising of 1966 was crushed.

Thích Trí Quang's 1963 campaign, in which he exhorted followers to emulate the example of Mahatma Gandhi, saw widespread demonstrations against the government of President Ngô Đình Diệm which, due to the influence of both Diệm's elder brother, the Roman Catholic Archbishop of Huế, Pierre Martin Ngô Đình Thục, mistreated and persecuted the Buddhist majority. The suppression of Buddhists' civil rights and violent crackdowns on demonstrations, along with the self-immolation of at least five Buddhist monks led to a US-backed military coup in November 1963 in which Diệm and Nhu were deposed and assassinated.

From 1964 onwards, Thích Trí Quang was prominent in Buddhist-dominated demonstrations against the military junta of Nguyen Khanh, accusing the general of authoritarianism and not doing enough to remove Diem supporters from positions of power, and then being prominent in protests against the junta of Air Marshal Nguyen Cao Ky, who had fired the pro-Buddhist General Nguyen Chanh Thi from his post in central Vietnam, a Buddhist stronghold. The civil unrest lasted for three months until Ky militarily crushed the Buddhist activists, ending their influence over South Vietnamese politics. Thich Tri Quang was put under house arrest and spent most of the remainder of his life writing and translating Buddhist texts.

== Early life ==
Thích Trí Quang was born as Phạm Quang on 21 December 1923 in the village of Diêm Điền to the west of the Nhật Lệ River, in Quảng Bình Province in central Vietnam. He entered the religious life at the age of 13 and was a disciple of Hòa Thượng (Most Venerable) Thích Trí Độ, the chairman of the Hội Phật Giáo Cứu Quốc (Buddhist Congregation for National Salvation). In 1937 he joined the Buddhist Studies Institute of the Huế Association of Buddhist Studies and successfully completed his education in 1945. In the following year he was ordained as a Buddhist monk. In his early days, Quang went to Ceylon to further his Buddhist studies. When he returned, he participated in anti-French activities, calling for the independence of Vietnam as part of the Hội Phật Giáo Cứu Quốc, and was arrested by the colonial authorities in 1946. He was released in 1947 and continued his anti-colonial activities for a period before returning to purely religious activities.

== Hue Phat Dan shootings ==
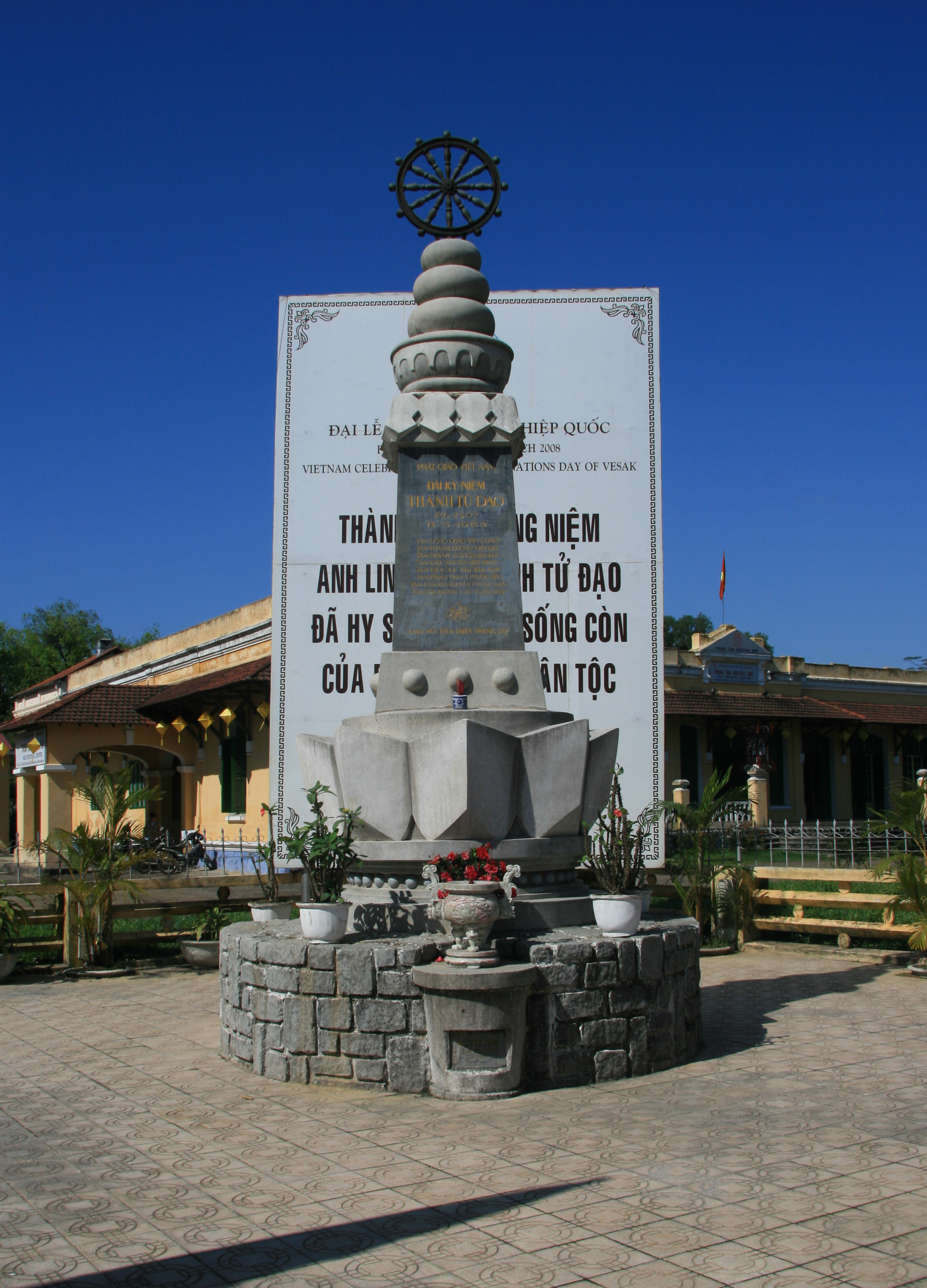
Memorial for the victims of the Huế Phật Đản shootings in 1963

In 1963, Vesak (the birthday of Gautama Buddha) fell on 8 May. The Buddhists of Huế had prepared celebrations for the occasion, including the display of the Buddhist flag. The government cited a rarely enforced regulation prohibiting the display of religious flags, banning it. This occurred despite the non-enforcement of the regulation on a Catholic event celebrating the fifth anniversary of Ngô Đình Thục as Archbishop of Huế less than a month earlier. The application of the law caused indignation among Buddhists on the eve of the most important religious festival of the year, since a week earlier Catholics had been allowed to display Vatican flags to celebrate the 25th anniversary of the appointment of Diệm's brother Thục as Archbishop of Huế. The celebrations had been bankrolled by Diệm's regime through a national committee which asked the population to donate money to Thục's jubilee. Buddhists complained that they had been forced to give a month's wages to pay for the celebration.

On Phật Đản, thousands of Buddhists defied the flag ban. Trí Quang addressed the crowd and exhorted them to rise up against Catholic discrimination against Buddhism. He called the Buddhists to congregate outside the government radio station in the evening for a rally. Tension increased throughout the day with demonstrators chanting and displaying anti-government slogans as the crowd grew. They expected to hear another speech from Thích Trí Quang, but the speech was withdrawn from broadcast by the government censor. The military were called in to disperse the discontented crowd and fired directly into the crowd, killing nine and severely injuring four. Thích Trí Quang spent the night riding through the streets of Huế with a loudspeaker, accusing the government of firing on the demonstrators. He then called on them to attend a public mass funeral for the Huế victims scheduled for 10 May. Such an emotion-charged spectacle would have attracted thousands of spectators and placed pressure on Diệm's regime to grant reforms, so the government announced a curfew and put all armed personnel on duty around the clock to "prevent VC infiltration". A confrontation was averted when Thích Trí Quang persuaded the protesters to lay down their flags and slogans and observe the 9 pm curfew.

=== Buddhist reaction and protests ===
On the following day, 10 May, tensions increased as a crowd of around 6,000 Buddhists attended Tu Dam Pagoda for the funerals and a series of meetings. Thich Tri Quang called on Buddhists to use unarmed struggle and follow Gandhian principles, saying "Carry no weapons; be prepared to die ... follow Gandhi's policies".

Thich Tri Quang proclaimed a five-point "manifesto of the monks" that demanded freedom to fly the Buddhist flag, religious equality between Buddhists and Catholics, compensation for the victims' families, an end to arbitrary arrests, and punishment for the officials responsible. Quang urged the demonstrators to not allow the Việt Cộng to exploit the unrest and exhorted a strategy of passive resistance.

As the crisis deepened, however, he traveled to the capital of Saigon for negotiations and further protests after the self immolation of Thích Quảng Đức on 11 June. Prior to 21 August raid on the Xá Lợi pagoda engineered by Nhu's secret police and special forces, he sought refuge at the U.S. Embassy in Saigon. He was accepted by U.S. Ambassador Henry Cabot Lodge Jr., who refused to hand him to Nhu's forces after they had ransacked pagodas, fired on civilians and beaten monks and nuns. In Huế, thirty people died as they attempted to protect their pagodas from Nhu's men. At the time, Thich Tri Quang was viewed very favourably by the US, which was frustrated with Diem's policies.

Following the coup on 1 November 1963, which removed Diệm and Nhu from power, it was reported that the military junta wanted Thích Trí Quang to be a part of the new cabinet, but the U.S. State Department recommended against this. Thích Trí Quang left the US Embassy on 4 November.

== Nguyen Khanh era ==
After the 1964 coup by General Nguyễn Khánh, which deposed the Dương Văn Minh junta, Khánh had Captain Nguyễn Văn Nhung, the bodyguard of Minh and executioner of Diệm and Nhu, executed. This generated rumours that pro-Diệm politicians would be restored to power and prompted Thích Trí Quang to cancel a planned pilgrimage to India to organise further demonstrations.

In early-1964, Thích Trí Quang continued to criticise Khánh and accused him of jailing Buddhists. Khánh was in a quandary, as he could be perceived as being too soft on Diệm supporters, or being vindictive towards Roman Catholics. To placate Trí Quang, Khánh agreed to remove all Roman Catholic chaplains from the military, but Thích Trí Quang remained critical of what he saw as a lack of vigour on the part of Khánh in removing Diệmists from positions of authority.

In July 1964, Khánh drafted a new constitution, known as the Vũng Tàu Charter, which would have augmented his personal power. However, this only served to weaken Khánh as large demonstrations and riots broke out in the cities, with Buddhists prominent, calling for an end to the state of emergency and the new constitution. Thích Trí Quang thought that, as Khánh would not use his power to remove Diệmists, it was merely an expression of megalomania. Fearing he could be toppled by the momentum of the protests, Khánh asked Trí Quang, Thich Tam Chau and Thich Thien Minh to hold talks with him at Vũng Tàu on 24 August. They refused and Khánh had to go to Saigon to try to get them to stop protesting against him, demonstrating his weakness. They asked him to repeal the new constitution, reinstate civilian rule, and remove Cần Lao members from power. They asked Khánh to announce these measures publicly, else they would organize a widespread movement of passive resistance. U.S. Ambassador Maxwell Taylor recommended that Khánh ignore the demands, as he regarded the Buddhist activists as a minority group, but Khánh thought to dampen religious tensions by agreeing to the Buddhist proposals. General Tran Thien Khiem claimed "Khánh felt there was no choice but to accept, since the influence of Trí Quang was so great that he could not only turn the majority of the people against the government but could influence the effectiveness of the armed forces".

In late-1964, Khánh and his generals tried to create a semblance of civilian rule by creating the High National Council, an appointed advisory body, which then selected Phan Khắc Sửu as chief of state, who in turn selected Trần Văn Hương as Prime Minister, a position with greater power, although the generals and Khánh retained the real power. Hương took a firm line against the Buddhists, accusing Tri Quang of being a Communist, who in turn charged Hương with being a Diệmist, and responded with mass protests against the new civilian administration, calling for its removal. Huong used the army to break up the demonstrations, resulting in violent confrontations. In January 1965, Hương intensified the anti-communist war effort by expanding military expenditure using aid money and equipment from the Americans, and increasing the size of the armed forces by widening the terms of conscription. This provoked widespread anti-Hương demonstrations and riots across the country, mainly from conscription-aged students and Buddhists who wanted negotiations. Reliant on Buddhist support, Khánh did little to try to contain the protests. Khánh then decided to have the armed forces take over the government. On 27 January, with the support of Nguyen Chanh Thi and Nguyen Cao Ky, Khánh removed Hương in a bloodless putsch.

== Buddhist Uprising ==
After Khanh was removed in a February 1965 coup, a civilian figurehead led the government, before the military, under Air Marshal Nguyễn Cao Kỳ and General Nguyễn Văn Thiệu took charge as prime minister and figurehead president, respectively in mid-1965. During this time, stability existed in Vietnam, and the generals who commanded South Vietnam's four corps oversaw separate geographical regions, and were given wide-ranging powers. In central Vietnam, the pro-Buddhist Nguyễn Chánh Thi oversaw I Corps and was aligned with Thích Trí Quang's viewpoints. Despite, the steady control of Kỳ and Thiệu, the religious tension remained. After one month, Thích Trí Quang began to call for the removal of Thiệu because he was a member of Diệm's Catholic Cần Lao Party, decrying his "fascistic tendencies", and claiming that Cần Lao members were undermining Kỳ. For Thích Trí Quang, Thiệu was a symbol of the Diệm era of Catholic domination, when advancement was based on religion. He had desired that General Thi, known for his pro-Buddhist position would lead the country, and denounced Thiệu for his alleged past crimes against Buddhists. Thích Trí Quang said that "Thi is nominally a Buddhist, but does not really care about religion".

Tension remained between Thi and Kỳ, who viewed him as a threat. In March 1966, Kỳ removed Thi from his position. Despite Thi's good relations with the Buddhists in his area, there were reports Kỳ had Thích Trí Quang's support for Thi's removal. If Kỳ thought that Thích Trí Quang would not organize demonstrations against Thi's dismissal, he turned out to be wrong, as the monk used the crisis to highlight Buddhist calls for civilian rule. There were claims that Thích Trí Quang had always intended to challenge Kỳ, regardless of whether or not Thi had been cast aside. Widespread demonstrations, strikes and riots erupted across central Vietnam, led by Buddhist activists, and some military units joined the unrest and refused to go along with Kỳ's policies.

At first, Kỳ tried to dampen discontent by meeting Buddhist leaders and promising elections and social reform; however, he also warned that street demonstrations would be suppressed. US Ambassador Henry Cabot Lodge Jr. met with Thích Trí Quang to warn him about taking aggressive actions. Although Thích Trí Quang accused Kỳ of "indulging in a cult of personality", most of the Buddhist banners focused their criticism against the Catholic figurehead chief of state Thiệu. Kỳ then promised a new constitution by November and possibly national elections by the end of the year, bringing it one year forward. However, Thích Trí Quang's supporters appeared unwilling to wait for Kỳ's schedule, calling for the Constituent Assembly that would draft the new constitution to be chosen from provincial and city councils, where Buddhists did well in elections, but Kỳ refused. Kỳ brought loyalist marines and paratroopers from Saigon to Da Nang to try and cow the dissidents, but this did not have the desired effect, so he returned to Saigon to meet Buddhist leaders for negotiations. The Buddhists demanded an amnesty for rioters and mutinous soldiers, and for Kỳ to withdraw the marines from Da Nang back to Saigon where they formed part of the strategic reserve. However, Thích Trí Quang maintained a firm position on the constitution and the protests continued.

In May, Thích Trí Quang went on a hunger strike, denouncing American support for the Kỳ-Thiệu junta, which he viewed as inappropriate interference in domestic affairs. After government forces moved into the streets of Huế, Thích Trí Quang responded to the situation by calling on Buddhists to place their altars onto the street to block the junta's troops and military vehicles. According to the historian Robert Topmiller, 'Vietnamese understood the depth of revulsion this act signified in view of the fact that “[by] placing the family altar before an approaching tank, one symbolically placed one’s ancestors, the embodiment of the family, before the tank. In other words, one risked everything.' Thousands complied, and the police and local ARVN forces did not stop them. For two days, the altars stopped all road traffic and prevented convoys from travelling north of the city for a military buildup. Thich Tri Quang later relented and allowed a few hours a day for such traffic. He then penned a letter accusing the US of "imperialism" and went on a hunger strike, until he was eventually ordered to stop in September by the Buddhist patriarch Thich Tinh Khiet. Kỳ ignored the Buddhist protests and sent 400 combat police as well as Airborne and Marines to secure the Hue, as well as Da Nang, Quang Tri and Qui Nhon. They entered unopposed, arrested dissident policemen and removed the altars to the side of the street.

On 22 June, Thích Trí Quang was arrested and taken to a local military hospital. He was later taken to Saigon and permanently put under house arrest, where only senior Buddhist leaders were able to see him. Thích Trí Quang's political influence was diminished, although he did still make some pronouncements from under arrest. In September 1966, he declared that the Unified Buddhist Congregation of Vietnam would boycott any elections organized under Ky and Thieu because candidates advocating for a peace agreement were banned. When the communists were about to overrun South Vietnam in April 1975, Thích Trí Quang lobbied for General Duong Van Minh to take power, which occurred. When the fall of Saigon came, Thích Trí Quang was again placed under house arrest but was released later. He maintained a low political profile at An Quang Pagoda, previously a focal point of Buddhist activist politics in the 1960s, where he spent his time writing Buddhist textbooks, translating and writing commentaries on sutras and vinayas. In 2013, he returned to visit Từ Đàm Pagoda in Hue and then decided to stay there and continue his scholarly activities.

== Death ==
Trí Quang died at 9.45 pm on 8 November 2019 in Từ Đàm Pagoda at age 95; no cause was given. In accordance with his will, his funeral rites commenced six hours after his death, with no altars or incense.

== Sources ==
- Buswell, Robert Jr; Lopez, Donald S. Jr., eds. (2013). Thich Tri Quang, in Princeton Dictionary of Buddhism. Princeton, NJ: Princeton University Press. ISBN 9780691157863.
- Hammer, Ellen J. (1987). A Death in November: America in Vietnam, 1963. New York City: E. P. Dutton. ISBN 0-525-24210-4.
- Jacobs, Seth (2006). Cold War Mandarin: Ngo Dinh Diem and the Origins of America's War in Vietnam, 1950–1963. Lanham, Maryland: Rowman & Littlefield. ISBN 0-7425-4447-8.
- Jones, Howard (2003). Death of a Generation: how the assassinations of Diem and JFK prolonged the Vietnam War. New York City: Oxford University Press. ISBN 0-19-505286-2.
- Kahin, George McT. (1986). Intervention : how America became involved in Vietnam. New York City: Knopf. ISBN 0-394-54367-X.
- Karnow, Stanley (1997). Vietnam: A history. New York: Penguin Books. ISBN 0-670-84218-4.
- McAllister, James (2008). "'Only Religions Count in Vietnam': Thich Tri Quang and the Vietnam War". Modern Asian Studies. 42 (4). New York: Cambridge University Press: 751–782. doi:10.1017/s0026749x07002855. S2CID 145595067.
- Moyar, Mark (2004). "Political Monks: The Militant Buddhist Movement during the Vietnam War". Modern Asian Studies. 38 (4). New York City: Cambridge University Press: 749–784. doi:10.1017/S0026749X04001295. S2CID 145723264.
- Moyar, Mark (2006). Triumph Forsaken: The Vietnam War, 1954–1965. New York City: Cambridge University Press. ISBN 0-521-86911-0.
- Topmiller, Robert J. (2006). The Lotus Unleashed: The Buddhist Peace Movement in South Vietnam, 1964–1966. Lexington, Kentucky: University Press of Kentucky. ISBN 0-8131-9166-1.
