= General Buddhist Association of Vietnam =

The General Buddhist Association of Vietnam was a Buddhist organization formed in the State of Vietnam in 1951, regarded as the first national Buddhist association of the country. It was prominent during the 1963 Buddhist crisis, a period of demonstrations and political instability which led to the deposal of President Ngo Dinh Diem. It was incorporated into the Unified Buddhist Church of Vietnam, established in 1964, but the organization soon de facto split into two factions: Quốc Tự and Ấn Quang. After the fall of Saigon, it effectively became outlawed under the communist government, who created their own Buddhist organisation under government control.
