= Từ Đàm Temple =

Buddhist temple in Vietnam

Coordinates: 16.4514°N 107.5817°E

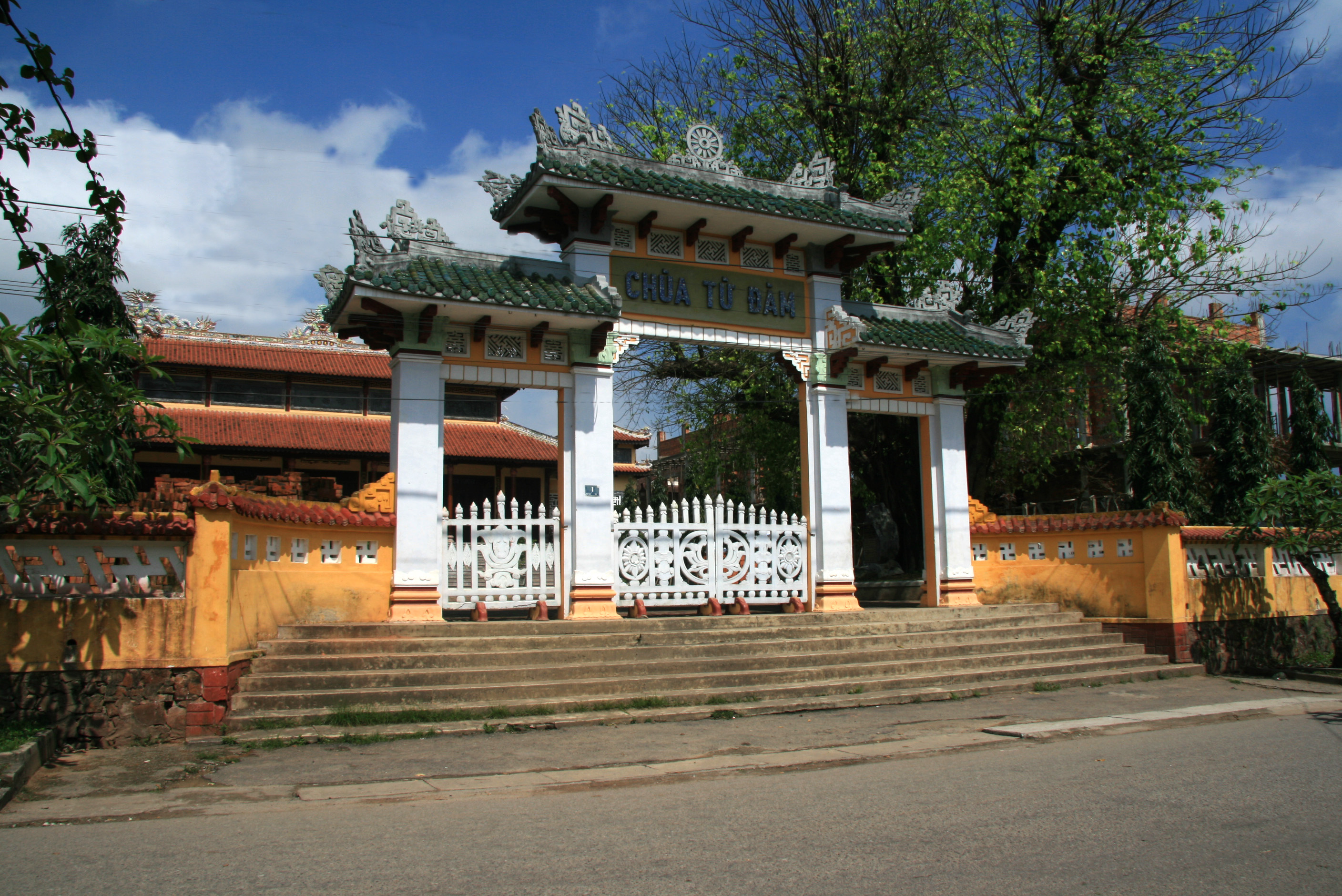
Tam quan gate at Từ Đàm Temple

Từ Đàm Temple (Chùa Từ Đàm) is a Buddhist temple located on a street of the same name in the Trường An District of Huế.

== History ==
The temple was built and opened under the direction of Thiền master Thích Minh Hoằng, who was the 34th in the lineage of the Lâm Tế Zen lineage. The temple was built in the late 17th century under the rule of Emperor Lê Hy Tông, on Long Sơn hill. However, the area was then under the rule of the Nguyễn lords, who nominally declared their allegiance to the Lê dynasty but in reality ran their own independent state, under Nguyễn Phúc Chu. At the time, the temple was also known as the Ấn Tôn Temple. In 1703, the ruling Nguyễn Lord, Nguyễn Phúc Chu gave the title "Sắc Tứ Ấn Tôn Tự". In 1841, Vietnam had been unified in its modern state by the Nguyễn dynasty and Emperor Thiệu Trị ordered that the temple be renamed so that it did not conflict with his name. The temple was one of the three national temples in Huế during the Nguyễn dynasty era.

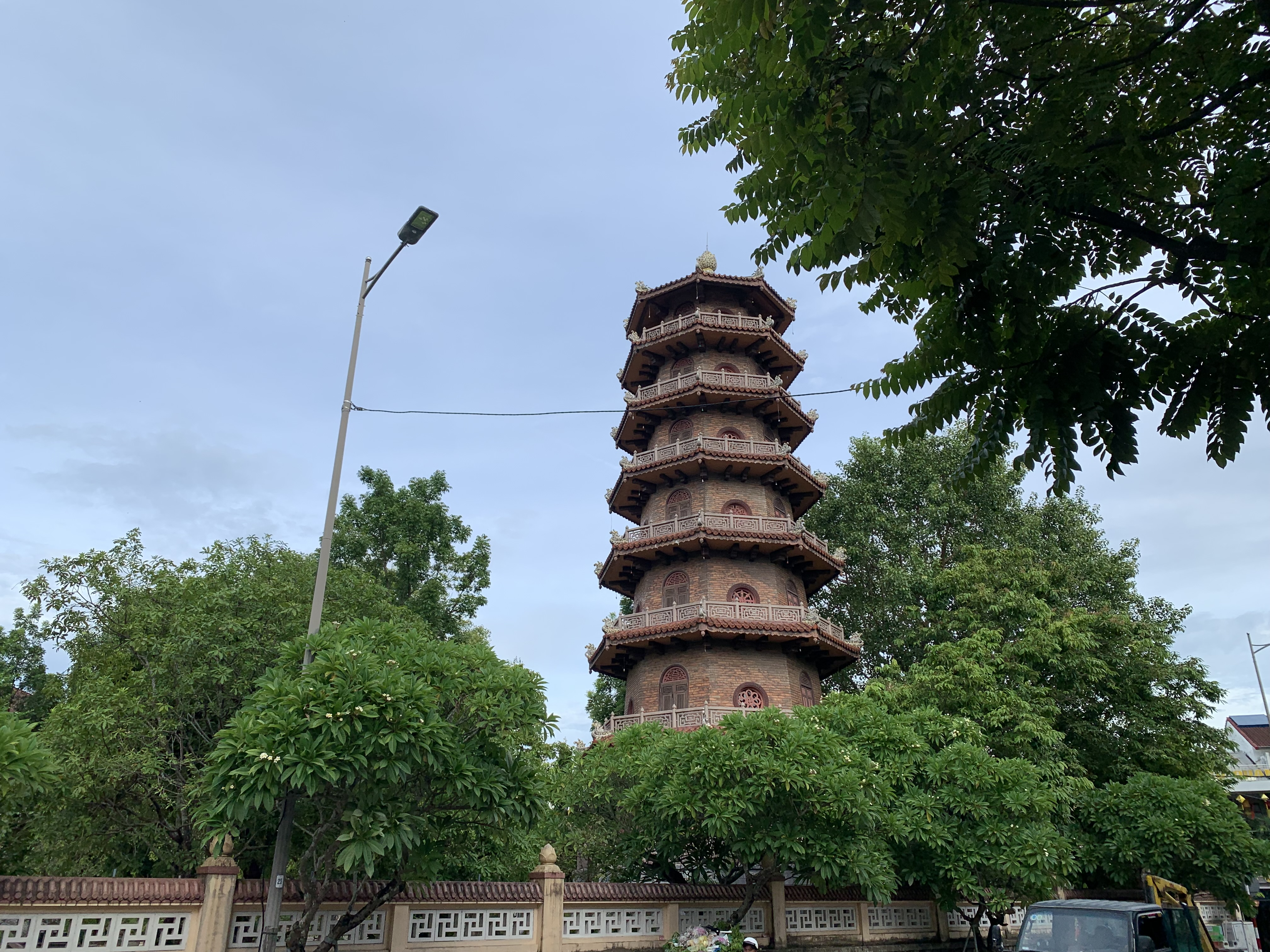
Pagoda of Từ Đàm Temple

Over the last 150 years, the temple has been one of the main spiritual facilities of Huế and the surrounding central region of Vietnam. Over the years, the temple has been renovated and expanded many times, under the direction of Thích Thiệt Vinh, Thích Minh Hoằng and Thích Đạo Trung. Under Thích Từ Vân, two major bells were cast and installed. In 1932, a nun, Thích Diệu Không, created a monastery for nuns. For a period the Association of Buddhist Studies of central Vietnam was based at the temple, during which time the main ceremonial hall was rebuilt. In 1939, Suzanne Karpelès, Secretary General of the Buddhist Studies Association of Phnom Penh in Cambodia, arranged for a bodhi tree offshoot to be taken from the original bodhi tree in Bodh Gaya under which Gautama Buddha achieved enlightenment, to be brought to the Từ Đàm pagoda. It was planted in the front yard of the temple, where it was grown up and become a permanent fixture.

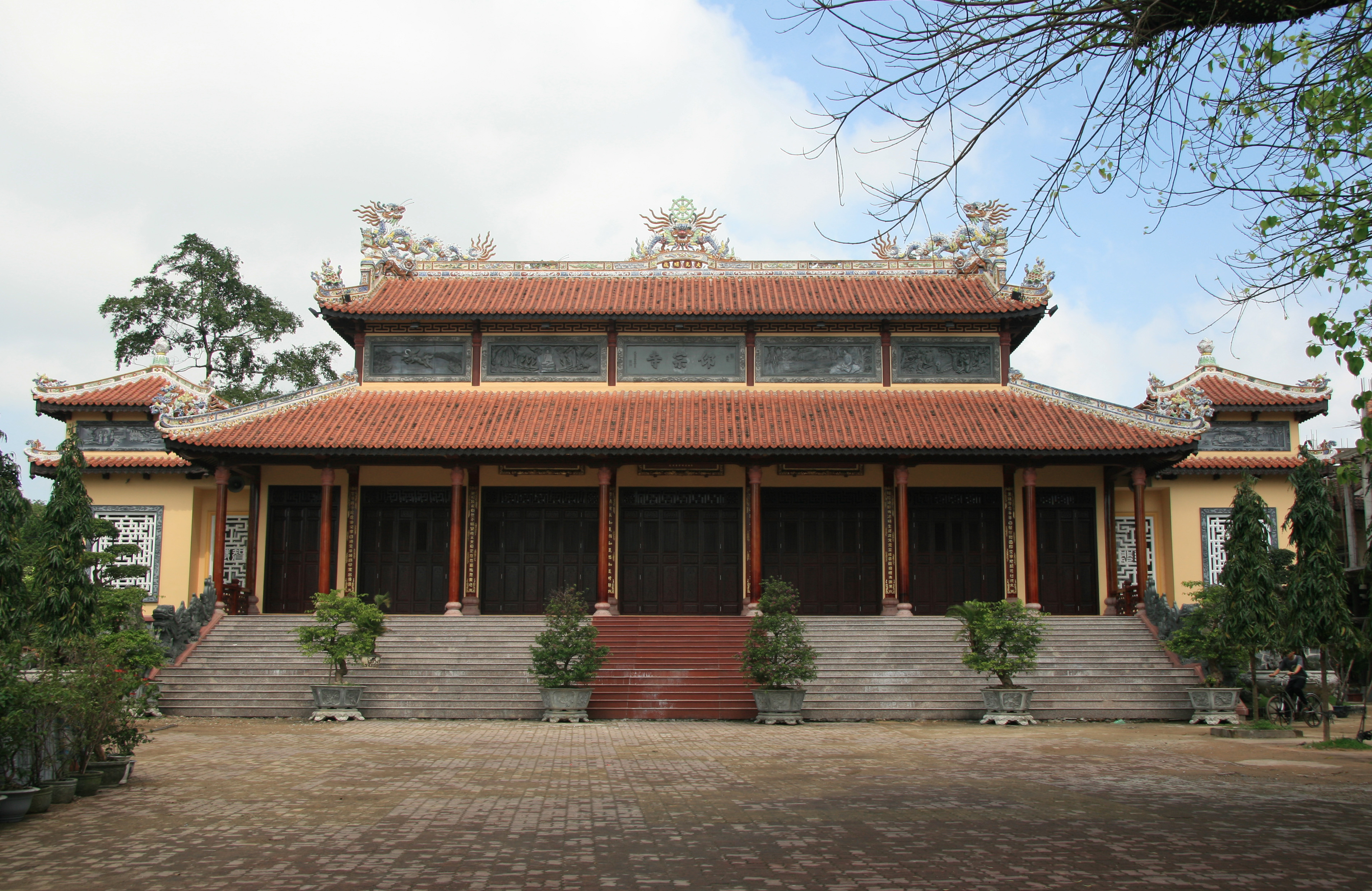
Main hall of Từ Đàm Temple

In 1951, the temple was the venue for a meeting of 51 notable Buddhist monks from across Vietnam, representing six different groups, to create a unified nationwide Buddhist organisation for all of Vietnam. At this meeting Thích Tịnh Khiết was chosen to be the head of Buddhism in Vietnam. It was during this meeting that the internationally designed Buddhist flag was first flown on the grounds of the temple. As Decree No. 10 by Bảo Đại prohibited the use of the name "church" by any other religion aside from the Catholic Church, the body called itself the General Association of Buddhists. In 1961, the administration of the temple along with the Association for Buddhist Studies organised for the construction of the a variety of buildings to increase the amount of activities that were able to be hosted by the temple.

== Buddhist crisis and temple raids ==
South Vietnam's Buddhist majority had long been discontented with the rule of President Ngô Đình Diệm since his rise to power in 1955. Diệm had shown strong favouritism towards Catholics and discrimination against Buddhists in the army, public service and distribution of government aid. In the countryside, Catholics were de facto exempt from performing corvée labour and in some rural areas, Catholic priests led private armies against Buddhist villages. Discontent with Diệm exploded into mass protest in Huế during the summer of 1963 when nine Buddhists died at the hand of Diệm's army and police on Vesak, the birthday of Gautama Buddha.

In May 1963, a law against the flying of religious flags was selectively invoked; the Buddhist flag was banned from display on Vesak while the Vatican flag was displayed to celebrate the anniversary of the consecration of Archbishop Pierre Martin Ngô Đình Thục, Diệm's elder brother.

Buddhists defied the ban and a protest that began with a march starting from Từ Đàm to the government broadcasting station was ended when government forces opened fire. As a result, Buddhist protests were held across the country and steadily grew in size, asking for the signing of a Joint Communique to end religious inequality. Từ Đàm Temple was a major organising point for the Buddhist movement and was often the location of hunger strikes, barricades and protests. This was because Thích Trí Quang, the abbot of Từ Đàm, was the main figure in the Buddhist movement, and at the time he was the head of the GAB in central Vietnam.

Self-immolations were used as a form of protest, an on 16 August, one such occurrence occurred at Từ Đàm when an elderly nun set herself alight. As the tension increased and opposition to Diệm increased, the key turning point came shortly after midnight on 21 August, when Ngô Đình Nhu's Special Forces raided and vandalised Buddhist temples across the country, rounding up thousands of monks and leaving hundreds dead.

Across the town of Huế, the approach of government forces were met by the beating of Buddhist drums and cymbals to alert the populace. The townsfolk left their homes in the middle of the night in an attempt to defend the city's temples. At Từ Đàm, monks attempted to burn the coffin of a monk who had self-immolated during previous protests. Government soldiers, firing M1 rifles, overran the pagoda and confiscated the coffin. They also demolished a statue of Gautama Buddha and looted and vandalized the pagoda. An explosion was set off by the troops, which leveled much of the pagoda. Many Buddhists were shot or clubbed to death.

== Later years ==
During 1968, the temple was heavily damaged during the Tet Offensive of the Vietnam War, some of which still remains unrepaired. In 1966, a bronze statue of the Gautama Buddha was cast to replace the one destroyed during the temple attacks of Diệm's regime. The temple is still inhabited by monks, and is the provincial headquarters of the Buddhist Association.

== Sources ==
- Jacobs, Seth (2006). Cold War Mandarin: Ngo Dinh Diem and the Origins of America's War in Vietnam, 1950-63. Rowman & Littlefield. ISBN 0-7425-4447-8.
- Jones, Howard (2003). Death of a Generation. Oxford University Press. ISBN 0-19-505286-2.
