= Reaction to the 1963 South Vietnamese coup d'état =

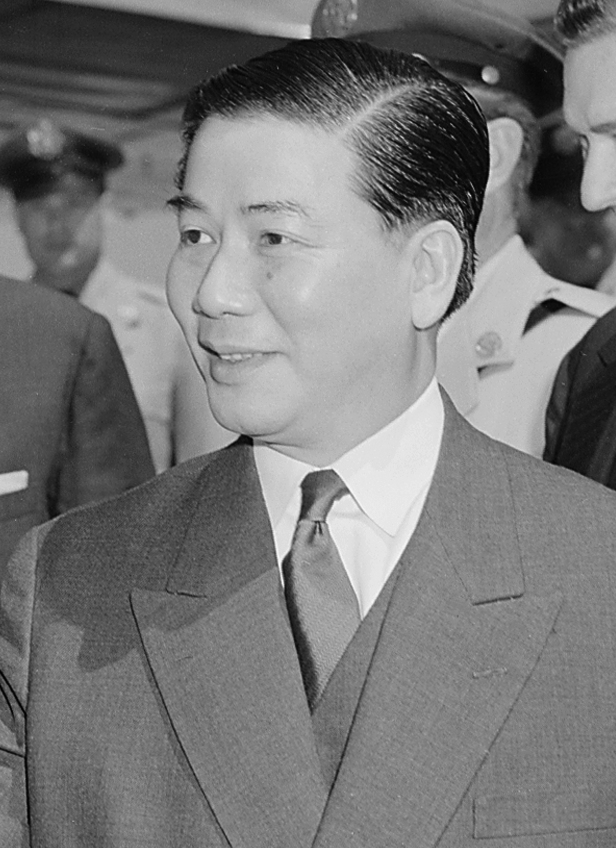
Ngô Đình Diệm

The reaction to the 1963 South Vietnamese coup that saw the arrest and assassination of Ngô Đình Diệm was mixed.

== Communist reaction ==
The coup was immediately denounced by the Soviet Union and the People's Republic of China, asserting that the coup had brought a United States "puppet" government. The remainders of the world expressed the general hope that the junta would end persecution against Buddhists and focus on defeating the communist insurgency.

Both North Vietnam and the Viet Cong were caught off guard by the events in Saigon. Radio Hanoi reported the events without a political comment, as they had not prepared a reaction to it. On one hand, the communist leaders were disheartened that they could no longer exploit Diệm's unpopularity. On the other hand, they were confident that Diệm's successors would be weak and fall apart easily, which would facilitate a communist revolution. The official newspaper, Nhan Dan, wrote "By throwing off Ngô Đình Diệm and his brother Ngô Đình Nhu, the US imperialists have themselves destroyed the political bases they had built up for years. The deaths of Diệm and Nhu were followed by the disintegration of big fragments of the ... [government] machine."

On the night of 1 November as Gia Long Palace was besieged, Vietcong radio in South Vietnam had urged the Vietnamese people, the National Liberation Front and ARVN loyalists to resist the coup. However, the generals' successful coup prevented any joint action. Within a week of the coup, the Viet Cong had regained its direction and launched more than one thousand attacks. A communist spokesperson expressed shock that the Americans had appeared to support the removal of Diệm, believing him to have been one of their strongest opponents. The leader of the Viet Cong, Nguyen Huu Tho, termed the coup as a "gift from Heaven for us." Some Viet Cong officials were so surprised the Americans would support Diệm's removal that they initially thought it was a trick. They felt that Diệm's removal was a blunder on the part of the Americans. Thơ said "Our enemy has been seriously weakened from all points of view, military, political and administrative. The special shock troops which were an essential support for the Diệm regime have been eliminated. The military command has been turned upside down and weakened by purges." He added:

For the same reasons, the coercive apparatus, set up over the years with great care by Diệm, is utterly shattered, specially at the base. The principle chiefs of security and the secret police, on which mainly depended the protection of the regime and the repression of the revolutionary movement, have been eliminated, purges.

Troops, officers, and officials of the army and administration are completely lost; they have no more confidence in their chiefs and have no idea to whom they should be loyal.

From the political point of view the weakening of our adversary is still clear. Reactionary political organizations like the Labor and Personalism Party, the National Revolutionary Movement, the Republican Youth, the Women's Solidarity Movement etc ... which constituted an appreciable support for the Regime have been dissolved, eliminated.

== Military reaction ==
Even before the start of the coup, the coup committee through General Lê Văn Kim had been in contact with civilian opposition figures and to some extent with members of Diệm's regime. Once the success of the coup was confirmed, negotiations by the generals' committee with the dissidents began in earnest. On the night of 1 November and the following day, all of Diệm's ministers were told to submit their resignations and did so. No reprisals were taken against them. Vice President Nguyễn Ngọc Thơ entered into intensive bargaining with Minh on 2 November on the composition of the interim government. Tho was aware of the desire of the generals to have him head a new government to provide continuity, and he used this knowledge to bargain with them about the makeup of the cabinet. He had no intention of being their puppet.

While these conferences were taking place, the Military Revolutionary Council as it called itself, distributed leaflets and press releases proclaiming the dissolution of the National Assembly and the abolition of the Diệm-Nhu government based on the constitution of 1956. The Council proclaimed its support for democratic principles such as free elections, unhindered political opposition, freedom of the press, freedom of religion, and an end to discrimination. They strongly emphasized that the purpose of the coup was to bolster the fight against the Vietcong which they pledged to pursue with renewed vigor and determination. They condemned the recent legislative elections as "dishonest and fraudulent" and imposed martial law, announced a curfew and ordered the release of all jailed monks and students. The MRC announced that they intended to rewrite the constitution and that they would establish "Democracy and liberty". In the interim, an appointed body known as the "Council of Notables" would replace the legislature in an advisory capacity. Senior American officers expressed optimism about the new junta: "They're putting some young tigers in command, and they could make an all-out effort to finish off the Vietcong". Robert Thompson told Henry Cabot Lodge, US Ambassador to South Vietnam, that "the coup should help very much to win the war".

== United States reaction ==
The US State Department reacted to the coup in terms of the recognition of the new government. Secretary of State Dean Rusk felt that a delay in recognition of the junta would help the generals to appear independent from the Americans. It was also thought that such a stance would allow the United States not to appear complicit. Rusk discouraged the generals from visiting Lodge in large groups to minimize the appearance that they were reporting to him as their superior.

A subsequent State Department message stressed the need to publicly emphasize the fact that the coup was an expression of national will by citing the near unanimous support of key military and civilian leaders. The message further stressed the importance of Vice President Nguyễn Ngọc Thơ in a quick return to constitutional rule and the need, therefore, for the junta to include him in an interim regime. Lodge replied affirmatively, indicating the United States should encourage other friendly countries to publicly recognize the new junta first with the assurance that the US would follow suit shortly thereafter. The United States would then resume the Commercial Import Program (CIP) that had been suspended in the meantime. Lodge advised the CIP be resumed quietly to avoid the appearance that it was a payoff for the coup.

On the afternoon of 3 November, two days after the coup, Đôn and Kim visited Lodge at the US Embassy in Saigon, explaining that Minh was busy in conversations with Thơ on the new government. The conversation was lengthy and covered many topics. It began with mutual expressions of satisfaction at the success of the coup, and continued with Lodge's assurance of forthcoming American recognition for their new government. The generals explained that they had decided on a two tier government structure with a military committee overseen by Minh presiding over a regular cabinet that would be predominantly civilian with Tho as Prime Minister. Lodge promised to attend to the immediate restoration of some aid programs and the speedy resumption of the others when the government was in place. They then discussed a series of immediate problems including the return of the Nhu children to Madame Nhu, the disposition of the rest of the Ngô family, press censorship, and the release of Thích Trí Quang from the Embassy.

== Announcement of the new junta ==
The new government was announced on the morning of 5 November. Minh was named president and Chief of the Military Committee; Tho was listed as Prime Minister, Minister of Economy, and Minister of Finance; Đôn was named Minister of Defense; and General Định was named to the Ministry of Security (Interior). Only one other general was included in the cabinet of fifteen, which was dominated by bureaucrats and civilians with no previous experience. Political figures, opposed to Diệm or not, were conspicuously absent from the cabinet. The announcement of the new cabinet was followed by the release of Provisional Constitutional Act No. 1, signed by Minh, formally suspending the 1956 constitution and detailing the structure and duty of the interim government. On 6 November, Saigon radio announced the composition of the Executive Committee of the Military Revolutionary Council. Minh was Chairman, Định and Đôn were deputy chairmen, and nine other senior generals, including Kim, Khiêm, Minh, Thiệu, and Phạm Xuân Chiểu were members. A notable omission was the II Corps commander, General Nguyễn Khánh, who had been transferred to the I Corps, the northernmost Corps and the furthest away from Saigon.

On 5 November, South Vietnam's new Foreign Minister sent a message to the Embassy officially informing Lodge of the change of government, and expressing the hope that relations between the two countries would continue and be strengthened. The State Department approved Lodge's proposed reply of recognition the following day, and under the pressure of other governments and the media, announced its intention to recognize the junta on 7 November in Washington. The recognition was delivered on 8 November, when Lodge called on the new Foreign Minister, Lắm, who, claiming to be insufficient for the job he had been given, asked for Lodge's advice. The main impression reported to Washington was that the new government would be heavily dependent on US advice and support, not only for the counter insurgency, but also in the day to day problems of running the country.

== Popular reaction ==
The removal from power of the Ngô family was greeted with widespread joy by the public of South Vietnam. Large and spontaneous street demonstrations occurred and the offices of the Times of Vietnam, the propaganda mouthpiece of Nhu and his wife, were burned. Young men wielding acetylene torches cut off the feet of the statues of the Trưng Sisters before the statues were hauled down with a cable around their necks. The Trưng Sisters were a 3rd-century AD pair who are venerated in Vietnam for their role in driving Chinese occupiers from the country, but Madame Nhu had modeled their features on her own as she fancied herself as a modern-day reincarnation. Elsewhere, crowds smashed windows and pulled down government flags from buildings and ransacked any building associated with Nhu. The tension released by the downfall of the regime sparked off celebrations rivaled only by Tết New Year celebrations.

American officials were treated and received with great enthusiasm and Lodge was mobbed by the Saigon public. A joke which circulated in Saigon in the aftermath of the coup was that Lodge would win any Vietnamese election by a landslide. Lodge recommended immediate recognition of the new regime by Washington, asserting that the popular approval of the Vietnamese for the coup warranted it. Lodge reported: "Every Vietnamese has a grin on his face today". The crowds swarmed onto the grounds of Gia Long Palace in the midst of what U.S. Deputy Chief of Mission William Trueheart called a "Mardi gras" atmosphere. The atmosphere was punctuated by the sound of celebratory ARVN gunfire as a sea of Buddhist flags flew throughout the city. As Lodge traveled from his residence to the US embassy, the crowds cheered his convoy. According to Mrs. Lodge, the atmosphere was "extraordinary". She further observed "I had not realized how feared and hated the government was…". As Lodge walked past the Xá Lợi Pagoda adjacent to the US Operations Mission building, he was warmly received. Xá Lợi had been at the heart of violent government raids by Nhu's Special Forces on 21 August 1963 which had left an estimated three-figure death toll across the country. Lodge and his wife were greeted by cries of "Vive Capa Lodge" and was ushered into the pagoda by the Buddhists. According to Mrs. Lodge, "they were so excited that they nearly squashed us". Lodge reported that the populace had "lionized" by the soldiers, giving them fruit, flowers and garlands of roses.

Madame Nhu, who was in the United States at the time, denounced the coup and accused the U.S. of orchestrating it. When asked about whether the US was involved, she replied "definitely", elaborating that "no coup can erupt without American incitement and backing" and declaring that she would not seek asylum "in a country whose government stabbed me in the back". She said "I believe all the devils of hell are against us" and that "whoever has the Americans as allies does not need enemies".

== Private US reaction ==
Frederick Nolting, who had been US ambassador to South Vietnam from 1961 until his removal in August due to his perceived closeness to Diệm, did not share the enthusiasm over Diem's fall. Nolting denounced the press reports of street celebrations, claiming that they were misleading and that the majority were still supportive of Diệm. Years after the coup, Nolting maintained "the majority were shocked and it was only the hotheads stirred up by I don't know what elements, but certainly some of them were Vietcong". In February 1964, Nolting resigned from the foreign service in protest of the American involvement in the coup and Diệm's death. He stated "that my decision had been influenced by my strong disapproval of certain actions which were taken last fall in relation to Vietnam, with predictable adverse consequences, I do not deny."

The United States publicly disclaimed responsibility or involvement in the coup. Harriman emphatically stated "There was nothing we did that I know of that encouraged the coup". General Maxwell Taylor, Chairman of the Joint Chiefs of Staff said "We couldn't have done anything about it had we known it was about to occur". Assistant Secretary of State Roger Hilsman stated "We never manipulated any coup, we never planned any coup" but he admitted that "we were perfectly aware that our public opposition to Diệm's Buddhist policy would encourage the plotters". Hilsmand did admit that Lodge's removal of the Saigon chief of the CIA, John H. Richardson was "terribly important" in signaling Washington's displeasure. Richardson had openly supported Nhu. Hilsman noted "This was probably the most significant thing that was done, but we didn't know that".

Privately, the White House was elated with the result of the coup. In a staff meeting the day after the coup, advisers praised the generals for what National Security Adviser Michael Forrestal called "a well executed coup, much better than anyone would have thought possible". Rusk wanted the generals to publicly announce that one of the major reasons for the coup was Nhu's "dickering with [the] communists to betray [the] anti-Communist cause". As a result, General Định told the press that Nhu had "entered negotiations" with North Vietnam for a peace settlement through the Polish representative on the International Control Commission that was charged with enforcing the Geneva Accords. The generals asserted that a neutralist Vietnam would culminate in the deaths of them and their family. Định asserted that he and his colleagues had no choice other than overthrowing the government.

The White House fostered the impression that the coup was purely Vietnamese in design. An unidentified administration source stated that "the plot was news to us". The Democratic Party Senate Majority Leader Mike Mansfield asserted that "the news of the coup came as a complete surprise to me and I am quite certain to the administration". He went on to say that "this appears to be a purely Vietnamese affair which the Vietnamese should settle among themselves". Rusk publicly stated: "We were not privy to these plans" and that "Americans were not involved in the planning nor were any Americans involved in the fighting. Rusk denied that the Americans had a "decisive influence" and insisted that it was a "South Vietnamese affair" but he realized that "our press problem is likely to be pinpointed on US involvement". The State Department press officer followed the government line, stating "I can categorically state that the US government was not involved in any way.

A year afterward, some administration officials admitted the nature of US involvement. John Mecklin claimed that the White House put "direct, relentless, table-hammering pressure on Diem such as the United States had seldom before attempted with a sovereign, friendly government". Trueheart went on to admit that the US was well aware of the generals' actions. He said that there were loyalty issues of publicly supporting a government while knowing that a coup was underway, but that it was "greatly offset by the feeling that we had been had by these people". Colby agreed with his colleagues that Richardson's removal was a major factor, regarding it as "a policy decision just to indicate the end of a close relationship with Nhu". Richardson was close to Diem and the CIA provided both technical assistance and financing to Nhu's Special Forces. Trueheart insisted that Richardson had to be recalled so that Lodge could show that he spoke for the White House. Trueheart commented "This was a clear signal, the only kind of really believable signal he could give".

== Media reaction ==
The media caught on to the signals that Washington had given to the junta. Time declared in its cover story that US economic aid reductions and public criticism of Diệm's policies towards the Buddhists had "set the scene for the coup" and made US denials "misleading". It asserted that the Kennedy administration's pressures were "an invitation to overthrow". One American official broke from the line and told the media: "Hell, there's been so much advance knowledge we can't possibly imagine why the Diệm government didn't know, too". A picture of Taylor, Minh and Walt Rostow on the tennis court in Saigon in October was printed with the caption "There could be no doubt that the US encouraged the coup". The New York Times asserted that Washington "had created the atmosphere that made the coup possible". It opined that Kennedy's CBS television interview with Walter Cronkite on 2 September in which the president called for "changes in policy and perhaps with personnel" amounted to a "virtual invitation to insurrection".

Over time, later investigations and analyses by US officials came to accept responsibility for the coup. The Pentagon Papers declared that the United States "must accept its full share of responsibility". It noted that from August and afterwards, Washington "variously authorized, sanctioned and encouraged the coup efforts of the Vietnamese generals and offered full support for a successor government". It referred to Washington's termination of aid in October as "a direct rebuff, giving a green light to the generals". The papers held that Washington maintained secret contact with the generals "throughout the planning and execution of the coup and sought to review their operational plans and proposed new government". In the 1970s, the Church Committees concluded that "American officials offered encouragement to the Vietnamese generals who plotted Diem's overthrow, and a CIA official in Vietnam gave the generals money after the coup had begun". The Pentagon Papers concluded that "[O]ur complicity in his overthrow heightened our responsibilities and our commitment in an essentially leaderless Vietnam."

== Communist policy response ==
On 7 November, five days after the coup, the National Liberation Front issued a response to the overthrow of Diem with a list of eight demands:

1. Destroy all strategic hamlets and other disguised camps
2. Release all political detainees
3. Promulgate without delay democratic freedom
4. Root out all vestiges of the fascist and militarist dictatorial regime
5. Stop all persecution and repression and raiding operations
6. Dissolve all nepotist organizations
7. Immediately stop forcible conscription
8. Cancel all kinds of unjustified taxes

Minh's regime could claim that it was in the process of meeting all of the Vietcong demands, except the halting of conscription, so the communists were effectively already preempted. On 17 November, the Central Committee of the NLF issued another series of demands:

1. Eliminate the vestiges of the Diệm regime
2. Establish democratic freedom
3. Eliminate American influence
4. Make social and economic reforms
5. Halt the fighting
6. Establish a coalition government

== Lodge reaction ==
Lodge cabled Washington after the coup, optimistically declaring, "The prospects now are for a shorter war, thanks to the fact that there is this new government, provided the generals stay together. Certainly officers and soldiers who can pull off an operation like this should be able to do very well on the battlefield if their hearts are as much in it".

Lodge described the coup as a "remarkably able performance in all respects" and was disappointed that officials in Washington were not as enthusiastic as he had hoped. He was gratified and proud in spite of a cable requesting an explanation for the deaths of the Ngô brothers "that have caused shock here". General Taylor noted that upon hearing of the death of Diệm, Kennedy rushed from the room where he was meeting with his advisers with "a look of shock and dismay ... which I had never seen before". Arthur Schlesinger recalled that Kennedy was "sombre and shaken". Kennedy penned in a memo that the assassination was "particularly abhorrent" and blamed himself for approving Cable 243 which authorized Lodge to explore coup options in the wake of Nhu's attacks on the Buddhist pagodas. Kennedy's reaction did not draw sympathy from his entire administration, some of whom believed he should not have supported the coup and that coups were uncontrollable, making assassinations a possibility. His national security adviser Michael Forrestal said that the deaths "troubled him deeply" "as a moral and religious matter".

Despite his initial reaction to the news of Diem's death, however, on November 6, Kennedy wrote Lodge a letter congratulating him for "a fine job."

== French reaction ==
One of the main arguments put forward by the junta in the aftermath of the coup was that it was necessary to prevent Diệm and Nhu from doing a deal with Hanoi to neutralize Vietnam. This was picked up by The New York Times which editorialized: "Fortunately the new Vietnamese rulers are pledged to stand with the free world. It is significant that one of their charges against Mr. Nhu is that he tried to make a deal with Communist North Vietnam along the lines hinted at by President de Gaulle".

On 4 November, the U.S. State Department directed the American ambassador in Paris to point out to de Gaulle "our feeling that change in regime ends any thought in Saigon of accommodation with North Vietnam on basis of neutralization which idea previous regime may have toyed with". The U.S. conveyed to the French that they felt that military success was much more probable with Diệm and Nhu gone, removing the need for peace talks with North Vietnam.

For de Gaulle, however, the fall of Diệm and his regime was a blow to French influence in Saigon and ended prospects for a peaceful settlement of the conflict. De Gaulle considered this to be a personal affront, since he did not believe that Hanoi and the Vietcong were pawns of international communism. De Gaulle had wanted to open diplomatic relations with communist China and did so in January 1964. The American ambassador told de Gaulle that the new regime in Saigon would have better prospects of a thaw in relations with Laos and Cambodia, and asked the French to use their influence in Phnom Penh to help. Norodom Sihanouk, the Cambodian prince, had disliked Diệm but also worried that the Americans were responsible.
