= South Vietnamese coup =

During the existence of the Republic of Vietnam, there were four coup d'états in South Vietnam and at least another four attempted coups.

South Vietnamese coup may refer to:

== Coups ==
- 1963 South Vietnamese coup
- January 1964 South Vietnamese coup
- December 1964 South Vietnamese coup
- 1965 South Vietnamese coup

== Coup attempts ==
- 1960 South Vietnamese coup attempt
- September 1964 South Vietnamese coup attempt
- Buddhist Uprising
- 1962 South Vietnamese Independence Palace bombing

== Other ==
- Arrest and assassination of Ngo Dinh Diem
- Reaction to the 1963 South Vietnamese coup
