= Nguyễn Thái =

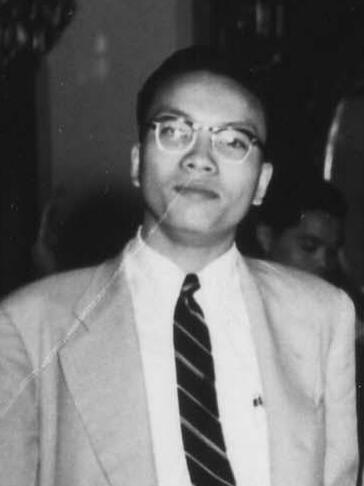
Nguyen Thai in Malacautang, 1954.

Nguyễn Thái a.k.a. Thai Nguyen (born January 30, 1930) is a former South Vietnamese government official who later attacked the regime of President Ngô Đình Diệm for its corruption. He was the first high-ranking government official to speak up against the Ngo family's corruption. Since the 1990s he has campaigned for reconciliation in Vietnam and elsewhere.

== Relation with Ngô Đình Diệm ==
In 1952, Thái — then, a graduate student at Cornell — first met Diệm as a political exile in Lakewood, New Jersey and helped him make contacts with American politicians and academics. Thái returned to Saigon in 1954 and became one of the closest aides to President Diệm. In late 1961, he resigned as Director General of the national news agency, Vietnam Press, to accept the Nieman Fellowship in Journalism at Harvard (1962–1963). In 1962, Thái published Is South Vietnam Viable?, exposing the corruption of the Ngo Family dictatorship and accurately predicting the imminent November 1963 coup which overthrew the Diem regime one year later.

== After Diệm ==
Thái returned to Saigon at the invitation of the new post-Diem government, but after a brief stint with the government of the Saigon generals, he became dissatisfied and left government service for the private sector. He founded IBA Ltd., a Honda-exclusive agency for Vietnam, which broke the monopoly of motorcycle importation to introduce the first million Honda motorcycles into Vietnam, giving Honda its predominant share of the motorcycle market in Vietnam.

Thái lost his left leg in a Viet Cong terrorist attack in Huế in May 1967. He returned to the United States for medical rehabilitation, and with his family settled down as a permanent resident in California. Until the 1975 collapse of South Vietnam, he urged — without success — his Saigon contacts to change course in order to avoid final disaster.

== After fall of South Vietnam ==
In 1990 Thái was the first former South Vietnam high government official to visit Communist Vietnam since the collapse of the Saigon regime. Since then he has made several subsequent visits advocating genuine reconciliation between former anti-Communists of South Vietnam and Communists of North Vietnam. He has also made several visits to Russia, Ukraine, Belarus and other countries formerly behind the Iron Curtain in the belief that today's world needs mutual understanding among all nations.

Nguyen Thai is listed in the Who's Who In Asia in the 1960s. He was a member of SRI International in the late 1960s.
