= Phạm Xuân Chiểu =

South Vietnamese general and diplomat (1920–2018)

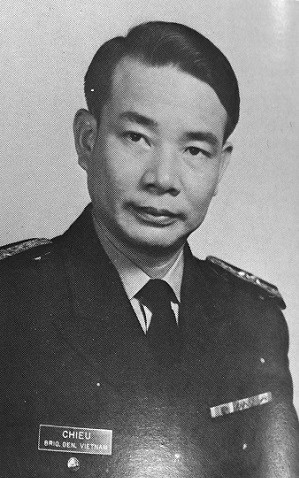
- Portrait of Chiểu at United States Army Command and General Staff College in 1961

South Vietnamese Ambassador to South Korea
- In office 19 May 1969 – 17 May 1975
- President: Nguyễn Văn Thiệu (19/05 1969–21/04 1975); Trần Văn Hương (21/04–28/04 1975); Dương Văn Minh (28/04–30/04 1975)
- Preceded by: Đỗ Cao Trí; Đặng Ngọc Diêu (as Chargé d'affaires)
- Succeeded by: Mission terminated

South Vietnamese Ambassador to the Republic of China
- In office 26 August 1964 – 19 April 1965
- President: Nguyễn Khánh (26-27/08 1964); Provisional Leadership Committee (Minh, Khánh and Khiêm) (27/08–08/09 1964); Dương Văn Minh (08/09–26/10 1964); Phan Khắc Sửu (26/10 1964–19/04 1965)
- Preceded by: Nguyễn Công Viên (as Chargé d'affaires)
- Succeeded by: Trần Thiện Khiêm

Personal details
- Born: November 20, 1920 Nộn Khê, Yên Mô, Ninh Bình, French Indochina
- Died: August 7, 2018 (aged 97) Rockville, Maryland, U.S.
- Spouse: Nguyễn Lệ Hà
- Children: 8
- Education: Lycée du Protectorat

Military service
- Allegiance: France; State of Vietnam; South Vietnam
- Branch/service: French Army; Vietnamese National Army; Army of the Republic of Vietnam
- Years of service: 1946–1965
- Rank: Lieutenant General (Trung Tướng)
- Battles/wars: First Indochina War; Vietnam War; 1963 South Vietnamese coup

Phạm Xuân Chiểu (November 20, 1920 – August 7, 2018) was a Lieutenant general of the Army of the Republic of Vietnam. He came from the Martial Arts School established by the Army of Vietnam Nationalist Party in the Northwestern region of North Vietnam, training Vietnamese people in parties to serve the resistance forces. Some later joined the French Union Army. During his time in the army, he was always assigned to take on positions related to consulting, so the consulting field can be considered as his specialty. He was also one of the few officers promoted to the rank of general during the First Republic period (Major General in early 1957). This proves that he himself was favored by President Ngô Đình Diệm. However in the 1963 coup, he was a member of the leading group of generals.

== Biography and military career ==
He was born on November 20, 1920, into a wealthy family of landowners in Nộn Khê village, Yên Mô district, Ninh Bình province. His great-grandfather was born as a judge (the villagers called him Mr. Phan Dang). He attended primary School in Ninh Binh, middle School in Nam Dinh and passed the entrance exam with Thanh Chung. In 1938, when he went to secondary school, his family sent him to Hanoi to study at the Lycée du Protectorat School (After 1945, it was renamed Chu Van An National High School, the folk name was called "Grapefruit School". ). In 1941, he passed the full Baccalaureate (Part II). After that, he entered the University and studied until the second year at Hanoi Medical University.

=== French Union Army ===
At the end of 1945, he joined the army with the number of 40/301,796. He attended the 4th course, the Martial Arts School was held by Tran Quoc Tuan Army in Chapa, Lao Kay, opened on January 1, 1946. In December of the same year, he graduated with the rank of Warrant Officer. After graduating from school, he was allowed to study at the Huangpu Martial Arts School, China. After graduating from school in April 1947, he was promoted to Second Lieutenant to serve in the Infantry Battalion of the French Union Army. In June 1948, he was promoted to lieutenant, seconded to be the Chief of Staff of the Auxiliary Unit of Phat Diem Sect Forces.

=== Vietnamese National Army ===
In 1950, after the State of Vietnam established the Vietnamese National Army, he was requisitioned to serve in the National Army and was promoted to Captain. In July 1952, he was sent to study in a Staff class at the Paris Staff School (École d'État Major de Paris, France) and returned home in early 1953. In August 1954, after the Geneva Agreement (July 20), he moved to the South and was promoted to Major and was appointed Battalion commander of the 18th Vietnamese Battalion stationed in the Central Highlands.

=== The Army of the Republic of Vietnam ===
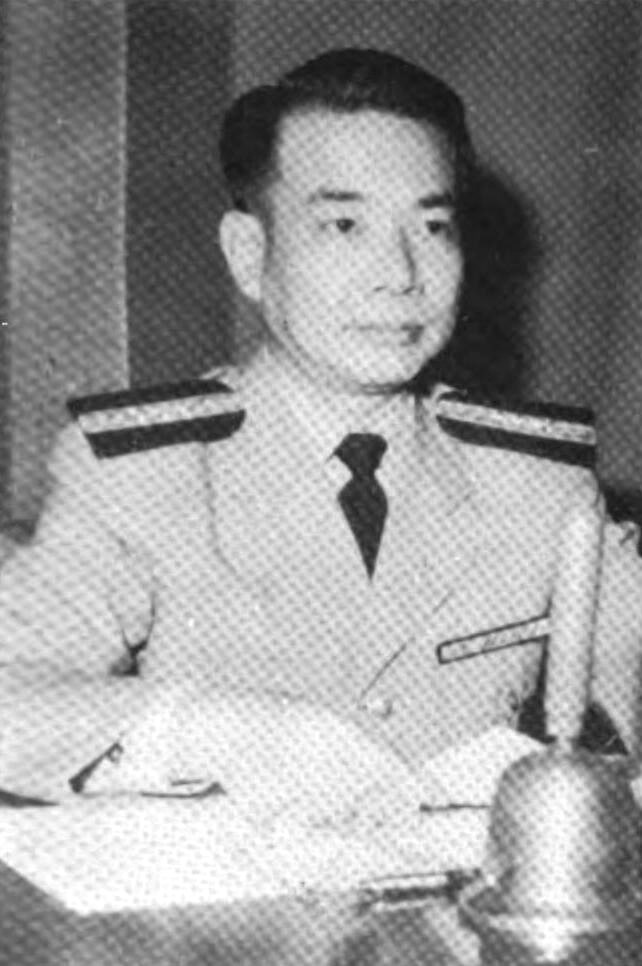
General Phạm Xuân Chiểu

In November 1955, after the National Army was renamed the Army of the Republic of Vietnam and transferred to a new army structure, he was promoted to Lieutenant Colonel and held the position of Chief of Staff of the First Military Region of South Vietnam by Colonel Trần Văn Minh as commander. On December 8, 1956, he was promoted to Colonel and was appointed to hold the position of General Director of the General Department of Police and Public Security, replacing Major General Nguyễn Ngọc Lễ who was sent to hold the position of Commander of the Training Center No. 1. On February 27, 1957, he was promoted to the rank of Major General in office.

On March 7, 1958, he received the order to hand over the post of General Director of Police-Public Security to Major General Nguyen Van La. On August 15 of the same year, he was appointed to hold the position of Joint Chiefs of Staff at the General Staff. By mid-September 1960, the position of Joint Chiefs of Staff was handed over to Major General Nguyễn Khánh. Soon after, he was appointed to hold the position of Commander of the Command School, replacing Lieutenant General Tran Van Minh. In August 1961, handing over the General Staff Command School to Lieutenant General Thai Quang Hoang, he was sent to study abroad for the Senior Staff Class (class 1961 - 1962) for 42 weeks at Fort Leavenworth Academy, Kansas, United States. In the middle of 1962, after graduating from school, he returned to the country to serve at the General Staff.

On November 1, 1963, he participated in the coup against President Ngô Đình Diệm's regime. On November 2, he was promoted to lieutenant general to hold the position of Security Commissioner of the Revolutionary Military Council, chaired by Lieutenant General Dương Văn Minh.

In early February 1964, after the January 30 Rectification to seize the leadership of General Nguyễn Khánh, he was appointed as the Third Vice Chairman of the Revolutionary Military Council, chaired by Lieutenant General Nguyễn Khánh. On February 17, 1965, he was elected by the Council of Generals as Chairman of the National Legislative Council. This council consists of 20 members. In October of the same year, he was discharged from the army because he had served in the army for over 20 years, and at the same time he was appointed Ambassador of the Republic of Vietnam to South Korea until October 1969, when his term ended, he returned home.

== Since 1975 ==
After the Fall of Saigon on April 30, 1975, he stayed in South Korea until the end of the year, then moved to the United States, settling in Rockville, Maryland.

He died on August 7, 2018, at his place of residence. He was 97 years old.

== Family ==
- Wife: Mrs. Nguyễn Lệ Hà

They have 8 children (3 boys, 5 girls):

Phạm Xuân Giang, Phạm Hùng Quốc, Phạm Xuân Chử, Phạm Thị Tường Nguyên, Phạm Thị Khánh Chi, Phạm Thị Tường Vân, Phạm Thị Tường Anh, Phạm Thị Tường Loan
