= Cable 243 =

1963 US coup authorization in South Vietnam

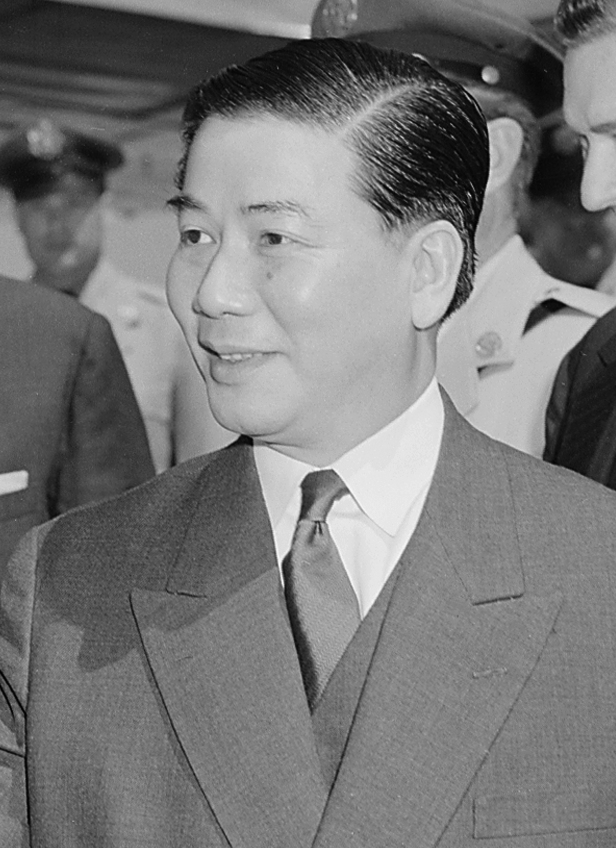
President of South Vietnam from 1955 to 1963 Ngô Đình Diệm

DEPTEL 243, also known as Telegram 243, the August 24 cable or most commonly Cable 243, was a high-profile message sent on 24 August 1963, by the United States Department of State in reply to Henry Cabot Lodge Jr., the newly appointed US ambassador to South Vietnam who had arrived in the country two days earlier. The cable came in the wake of the midnight raids on 21 August by the regime of Ngô Đình Diệm against Buddhist pagodas across the country, in which hundreds were believed to have been killed. The raids were orchestrated by Diệm's brother Ngô Đình Nhu and precipitated a change in US policy. Lodge, who had arrived in Saigon on 22 August (the day after the raids), sent a cable to the State Department reporting that some generals of the Army of the Republic of Vietnam (ARVN) and high civilian officials were telling CIA agents and diplomats at the embassy that the US should support Diệm's removal in the wake of the attacks, but Lodge cautioned that the most pivotal commanders around Saigon were still loyal to the Ngo brothers and the loyalties of other officers were unknown, which would make American support of a coup d'état a "shot in the dark." Lodge's cable reached Washington on Saturday morning, 24 August. Later that day, Cable 243 was sent back as a reply to Lodge's report, declaring that Washington would no longer tolerate Nhu remaining in a position of power and ordering Lodge to pressure Diệm to remove his brother. It said that if Diệm refused, the Americans would explore the possibility for alternative leadership in South Vietnam. In effect, the cable authorized Lodge to give the green light to ARVN officers to launch a coup against Diệm if he did not willingly remove Nhu from power. The cable marked a turning point in US-Diem relations and was described in the Pentagon Papers as "controversial". The historian John M. Newman described it as "the single most controversial cable of the Vietnam War".

The cable also highlighted an internal split in the Kennedy administration, with anti-Diệm officials in the State Department prevailing over generals and Department of Defense officials who remained optimistic that the Vietnam War was proceeding well under Diệm. That was underlined by the manner in which the cable was prepared before it was transmitted to Lodge.

== Background ==
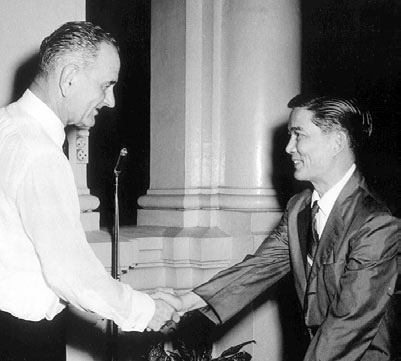
Nhu (right), shaking hands with US vice president Lyndon B. Johnson in 1961

The cable came in the wake of the midnight raids of 21 August by the Catholic regime of Ngô Đình Diệm against Buddhist pagodas across the country in which hundreds were believed to have been killed and more than a thousand monks and nuns were arrested. The pagodas were also extensively vandalized. Initially, the raids coincided with the declaration of martial law on the day before. A group of generals of the Army of the Republic of Vietnam had asked Diệm to give them extra powers to fight the Viet Cong but secretly wanted to maneuver for a coup. Diệm agreed, so that Nhu's Special Forces could take advantage and attack the Buddhist pagoda while disguised as regular ARVN forces. The raids were instigated by Nhu's Special Forces and Secret Police.

At first, there was confusion as to what had occurred. Nhu had ordered the phone lines into the US embassy and the US Information Service to be cut. A curfew was imposed on the streets, and it was initially believed that the regular army had orchestrated the attacks. The Voice of America initially broadcast Nhu's version of the events, which held that the army was responsible. This infuriated the ARVN generals, since many Vietnamese listened to the program as their only source of non-government, non-propaganda news. Through CIA officer Lucien Conein, General Trần Văn Đôn communicated to the Americans that Nhu had created the impression that the ARVN were responsible in order to increase dissent among the lower ranks and to weaken support for and discredit the generals in case they were planning a coup.

== Preparation ==
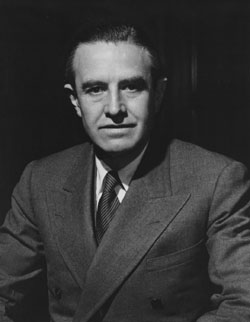
W. Averell Harriman (1891–1986), one of the foremost proponents of Diệm's removal and key figure behind the cable

The message was drafted by W. Averell Harriman, Roger Hilsman, and Michael Forrestal who were the only senior State Department officials on duty on 24 August 1963, a Saturday afternoon, with Defense Secretary Robert McNamara and CIA director John McCone on vacation.

President John F. Kennedy was on vacation at Hyannis Port, his family retreat, when Forrestal telephoned seeking to expedite the process with the commander-in-chief's verbal approval. Kennedy asked them to "wait until Monday" when all the key figures would be in Washington, but Forrestal said that Harriman and Hilsman wanted to get the cable "out right away". Kennedy thus told Forrestal to get another high-ranking official to "get it cleared".

Harriman and Hilsman then drove from their offices to a Maryland golf course where Under Secretary of State George Ball was playing with Alexis Johnson. Ball told the trio to meet him at his home after he and Johnson finished their round of golf. Having returned home, Ball read the message but, knowing that the telegram could raise the morale of the generals and prompt a coup, refused to authorize it until his three visitors had gained Secretary of State Dean Rusk's endorsement. Those present at Ball's home then phoned and read the important passages of the message to Rusk. They asked Rusk what he thought of the message if Kennedy was comfortable too. Rusk replied, "Well, go ahead. If the President understood the implications, [I] would give a green light".

Ball then discussed the matter with the President, who asked over the phone, "What do you think?" Ball said that Harriman and Hilsman were in strong support and that his "watered down" version "would certainly be taken as encouragement by the generals to a coup". Ball said that his group regarded Diệm as an embarrassment to Washington because of his "most unconscionable and cruel, uncivilized" actions. He further cited Nhu's violence against the Buddhists and Madame Nhu's verbal attacks as reasons for breaking with Diệm. According to Ball, Kennedy appeared to be broadly supportive of the cable but was apprehensive as to whether a new leader would do a better job. As McNamara was away, Kennedy told Ball that the message was acceptable if Rusk and Roswell Gilpatric endorsed it.

Rusk then approved the message. In the 1980s, Rusk said, "If Ball, Harriman, and President Kennedy were going to send it out, I wasn't going to raise any questions". Forrestal then phoned Gilpatric's farm in the evening and told him that both Kennedy and Rusk had already approved. Gilpatric later recalled, "If Rusk went along with it and the President went along with it, I wasn't going to oppose it". He washed his hands of the matter since it was between Kennedy and the State Department: "In McNamara's absence I felt I should not hold it up, so I went along with it just like you countersign a voucher". Marine General Victor Krulak also signed off without showing his superior, the Chairman of the Joint Chiefs of Staff General Maxwell Taylor. Richard Helms of the CIA also endorsed the message without notifying Director John McCone and later said that he believed that Forrestal was only advising of a resolution that had already been made. Forrestal then told Kennedy that he had gained the support of Kennedy's inner circle, so the president told him to send the message. Cable 243 was thus sent to Lodge at 21:36.

== Content ==
The opening paragraphs of the cable stated:

It is now clear that whether military proposed martial law or whether Nhu tricked them into it, Nhu took advantage of its imposition to smash pagodas with police and Tung's Special Forces loyal to him, thus placing onus on military in eyes of world and Vietnamese people. Also clear that Nhu has maneuvered himself into commanding position.

US Government cannot tolerate situation in which power lies in Nhu's hands. Diệm must be given chance to rid himself of Nhu and his coterie and replace them with best military and political personalities available.

If, in spite of all your efforts, Diệm remains obdurate and refuses, then we must face the possibility that Diệm himself cannot be preserved.

The cable went on to instruct Lodge to inform Diệm that the US could not accept the raids and to call for strong action to address the Buddhist crisis. Lodge was told to tell the South Vietnamese military officers that:

[The] US would find it impossible to continue support GVN militarily and economically unless [the] above steps are taken immediately which we recognize requires [the] removal of the Nhus from the scene. We wish [to] give Diệm reasonable opportunity to remove [the] Nhus, but if he remains obdurate, then we are prepared to accept the obvious implication that we can no longer support Diệm. You may also tell [the] appropriate military commanders [that] we will give them direct support in any interim period of breakdown [of the] central government mechanism.

The cable also informed Lodge of the need to exonerate the ARVN from responsibility of the pagoda raids. It asked Lodge to approve a broadcast by the Voice of America placing the responsibility on Nhu. Lodge was further requested to examine and search for alternative leadership to replace Diệm.

== Lodge's response ==
Lodge replied the next day and endorsed the strong position but proposed to refrain from approaching Diệm to suggest that Nhu be removed. Lodge advocated only stating the US position to the generals, which would effectively encourage the ARVN to stage a coup. Lodge's cable stated:

Believe that [the] chances of Diệm's meeting our demands are virtually nil. At the same time, by making them we give Nhu [a] chance to forestall or block action by [the] military. [The] Risk, we believe, is not worth taking, with Nhu in control [of] combat forces Saigon. Therefore, [we] propose we go straight to [the] Generals with our demands, without informing Diệm. [We] Would tell them [that] we [are] prepared have Diệm without [the] Nhus but it is in effect up to them whether to keep him. . . . Request immediate modification instructions.

"Agree to modification proposed," Ball and Hillsman assented.

== Infighting ==
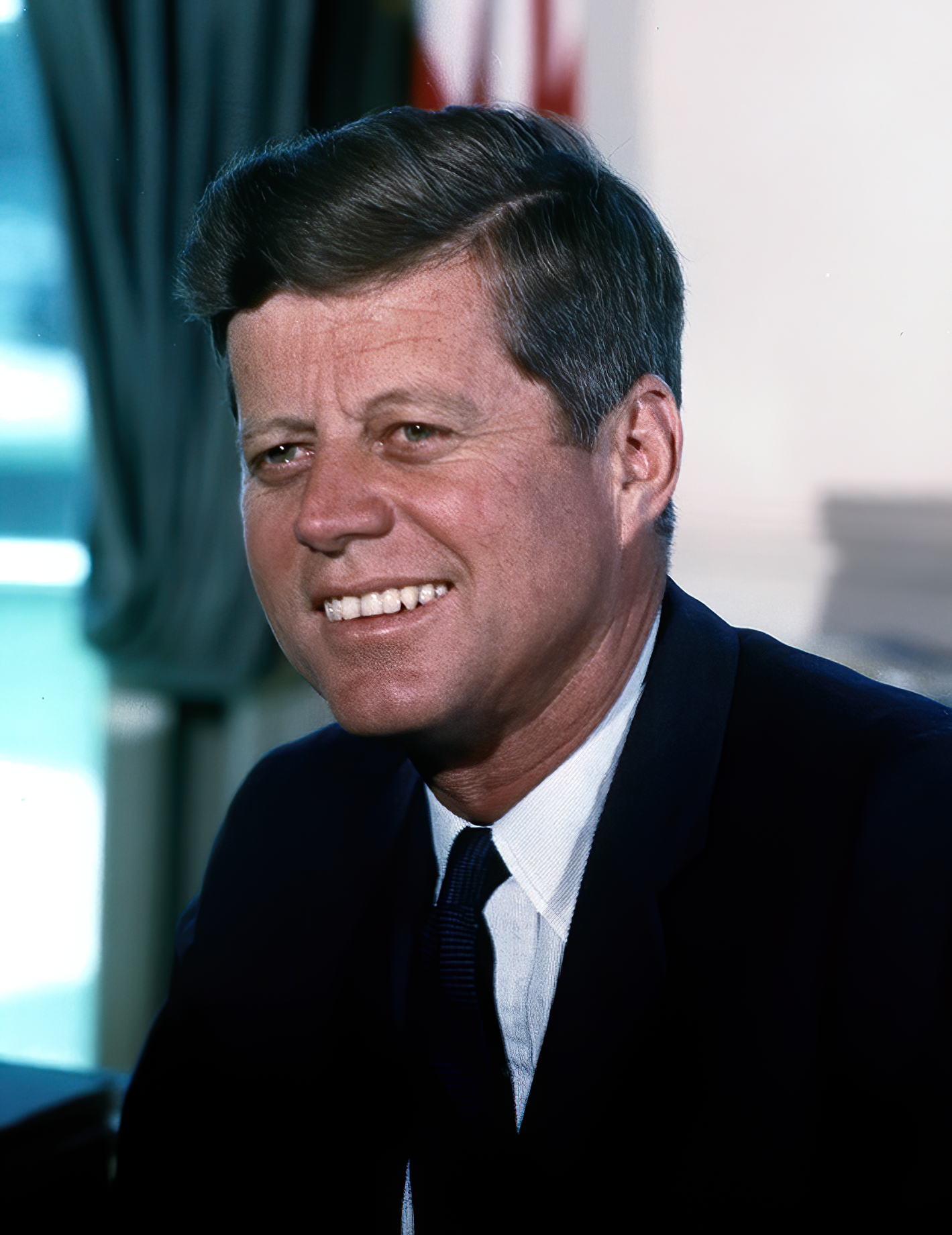
American president John F. Kennedy regretted his authorization of the coup

The decision to authorize the cable prompted significant infighting in the Kennedy administration, which began on a Monday morning meeting at the White House on August 26. Kennedy was met with angry comments by US Secretary of State Dean Rusk, McNamara, McCone, and Chairman of the Joint Chiefs of Staff General Maxwell Taylor, all of whom denied authorizing the cable. Kennedy was reported to have said, "My God! My government's coming apart".

Taylor felt insulted by the final line of the cable, which asserted that only the "minimum essential people" had seen its contents. During an acrimonious exchange at a midday meeting, he condemned the cable as an "egregious end run" by an anti-Diệm faction. Hilsman rebutted Taylor by asserting that Kennedy and representatives of departments and agencies had approved the message. Years afterward, Taylor declared:

The anti-Diệm group centered in State [department] had taken advantage of the absence of the principal officials to get out instructions which would never have been approved as written under normal circumstances.

Taylor claimed that the message was reflective of Forrestal and Hilsman's "well-known compulsion" to remove Diem and accused them of pulling "a fast one".

Kennedy could no longer stand the arguing among his officials and shouted, "This shit has got to stop!" Kennedy was angry at Forrestal and Harriman, Forrestal for what Kennedy deemed to be incompetence and Harriman for indiscretion. When Kennedy angrily criticised Forrestal for proceeding without gaining the explicit approval of McCone, Forrestal offered to resign. Kennedy acerbically replied, "You're not worth firing. You owe me something, so you stick around".

In the end, despite the bitter disagreement, the cable was not retracted. Ball refused to back down and maintained that "the evil influence of the Nhus" overrode all other factors. Ball later described Diệm as "an offense to America" and said that his government should not tolerate "such brutality and crass disregard of world sensitivities". However, he also admitted that he did not know much about the leading figures in South Vietnam.

McCone did not advocate a reversal of policy despite disagreeing with the process in which the telegram left Washington. Taylor also agreed to stand by the original decision despite his disagreement. He said, "You can't change American policy in twenty-four hours and expect anyone to ever believe you again". Kennedy walked around the meeting table and asked each of his advisers whether they wanted to change course. None of them were willing to tell him to retract his telegram.

Colby recalled, "It is difficult indeed to tell a President to his face that something he has approved is wrong and to do so without anything positive to offer in its place".

As a result, Kennedy chose not to revoke Cable 243, thereby enabling Lodge to proceed in encouraging a coup. The historian Howard Jones called that "a momentous decision".

According to Hilsman, Kennedy "didn't say anything" with regards to reservations about the coup. Kennedy had unanimous but uneasy and unhappy support from his advisers, but in reality, only the decision had been made by members of a vocal anti-Diệm minority that had sidestepped their colleagues and avoided getting a consensus to put in place a policy without a thorough deliberation.

The president was angry with himself and his advisers. He had been pressured into a hasty decision, and his advisers had been dishonest.

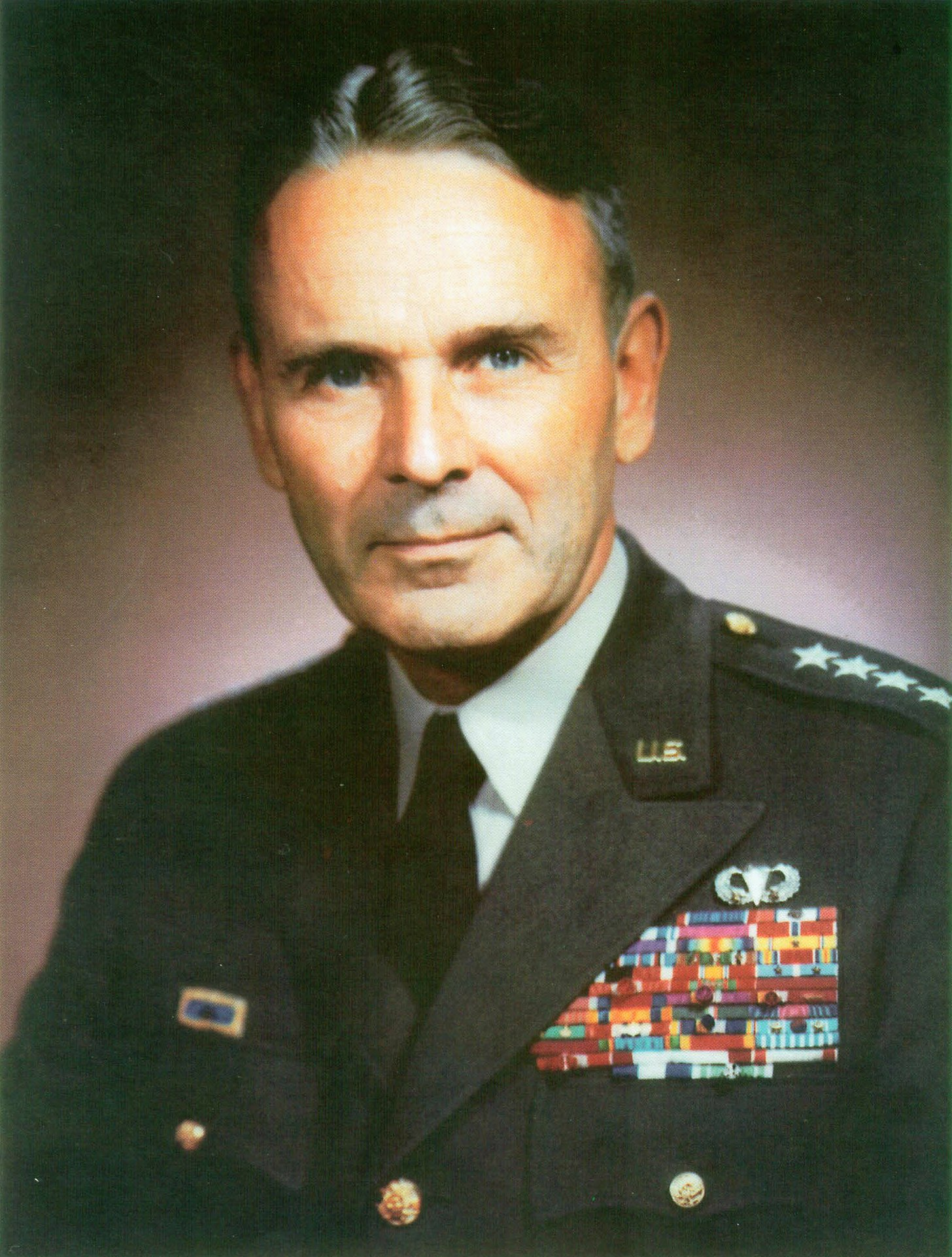
Maxwell Taylor, the Chairman of the US Joint Chiefs of Staff, strongly opposed the cable

Robert Kennedy had discussed the matter of revoking the cable with McNamara and Taylor but felt pressured into not backflipping on something that the administration had not "fully discussed, as every other major decision since the Bay of Pigs had been discussed". Taylor felt that the cable broke the solidarity of the Kennedy administration and created a cold atmosphere.

Kennedy later described the cable as a "major mistake" and felt that most of the blame fell at Harriman's feet. His brother said, "The result is we started down a road that we never really recovered from".

Encouraged by the authorization for Lodge to interfere directly in South Vietnam's governance process, Diệm's critics in the State Department tried to capitalize on the momentum that they had developed.

A midday meeting followed at the White House on the same Monday, August 26. Continuing on from Saturday's activism, Hilsman recommended pressuring Diệm to replace his brother Nhu with a combination of military figures and civilians. Encouraged by the administration's choice to proceed with the telegram, Hilsman said that if Diem retained his brother, Washington should move to remove Diem and start a military-led regime led by General Trần Thiện Khiêm, the Army Chief of Staff and General Nguyễn Khánh, who commanded the II Corps, one of the four in South Vietnam, based in the Central Highlands town of Pleiku.

Kennedy asked what was the thinking should the coup be unsuccessful. Hilsman spoke in gloomy terms, as Nhu was anti-American and subsequent relationships with him extremely difficult. McNamara agreed with Hilsman, but pictured an inevitable road to disaster. Both thought that only Tung's men and some marine battalions remained loyal to Nhu.

The advisors thought that the officer corps would mostly be anti-Diem after the pagoda raids and said that they would no longer fight if the Ngôs stayed in power. They thus concluded that if the coup failed, the communists would win and so the Americans had the choice of leaving Vietnam pre-emptively or be forced out if the coup failed or of overthrowing Diệm. Hilsman said that contingency plans for an American evacuation had been made.

Harriman then called for American moves for a coup, and Kennedy agreed. The president also criticized the media coverage of The New York Times' Saigon correspondent David Halberstam, who had both debunked Nhu's false claims that the army had launched the raids and been severely critical of the Ngô family.

Kennedy called for "assurances we were not giving him serious consideration in our decision. When we move to eliminate this government, it should not be the result of [The] New York Times pressure".

Taylor remained opposed to any moves towards the disposal of Diem. Years afterward, he said that Diem was "a terrible pain in the neck" but was a devoted servant of his country. Taylor called on Kennedy to support Diệm until a better leader had been lined up and pointed out that since the officers were divided, they could not be relied on to plot and stage a coup.

Hilsman then cited two phone calls on August 24 from Admiral Harry D. Felt, the commander of US forces in the Pacific. Felt called for backing to the generals to remove Nhu and said that the mid-level officers would not fight if Nhu was not removed. Taylor became angry that Felt had advised the State Department to move against Diệm without first consulting the Joint Chiefs of Staff. Taylor then told Kennedy that Americans would not tolerate officers selecting their president and so they should not usurp the cabinet in doing the same in South Vietnam.

When pressed by McNamara as to which generals to support, Hilsman listed only Dương Văn Minh, Trần Thiện Khiêm, and Nguyễn Khánh and said that the trio had some colleagues that it had refused to name. Kennedy expressed agreement with Lodge that the Ngô brothers would never part ways, as did officials in Vietnam, but Rusk disagreed. He was still hesitant to endorse a coup but said that a decisive action would be necessary either way. Hilsman continued to say that the Vietnamese public blamed the Nhus for the situation and would welcome a coup, which he thought would need support. Rusk said that if Nhu stayed, "we must actually decide whether to move our resources out or to move our troops in". Hilsman ended the meeting by saying, "It is imperative that we act".

According to Jones, the policy was "inherently contradictory: It offered Diệm an opportunity to salvage his regime by making reforms at the same time that it undercut his regime by assuring assistance to the generals if they staged a coup".

== Sources ==
- "State-Saigon Cable 243; source: JFKL: JFKP: National Security File: Meetings & Memoranda series, box 316, folder: Meetings on Vietnam 8/24/63–8/31/63" (PDF). 24 August 1963.
- Jacobs, Seth (2006). Cold War Mandarin: Ngo Dinh Diem and the Origins of America's War in Vietnam, 1950–1963. Lanham, Maryland: Rowman & Littlefield. ISBN 0-7425-4447-8.
- Jones, Howard (2003). Death of a Generation: how the assassinations of Diem and JFK prolonged the Vietnam War. New York City, New York: Oxford University Press. ISBN 0-19-505286-2.
