= Michael Forrestal =

United States government official (1927–1989)

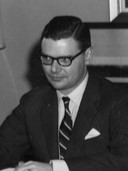
- Born: Michael Vincent Forrestal; November 26, 1927; New York City, U.S.
- Died: January 11, 1989 (aged 61); New York City, U.S.
- Resting place: Arlington National Cemetery
- Occupations: Government aide, legal adviser
- Parent(s): James and Josephine Forrestal

Michael Vincent Forrestal (November 26, 1927 – January 11, 1989) was one of the leading aides to McGeorge Bundy, the National Security Advisor of President John F. Kennedy. He was seen as a pivotal figure in the changing of U.S. foreign policy, including recommending support for the coup d'état that deposed the first president of South Vietnam, Ngô Đình Diệm.

Following the arrest and assassination of Diệm, which was backed by the Central Intelligence Agency, General Dương Văn Minh assumed the presidency in November, 1963. The negative repercussions from the coup and the John F. Kennedy assassination, which occurred later in the month, led to Forrestal's retirement from government service in 1965. Speculation at the time suggested that he left the White House because of his decreasing influence in the administration of Kennedy's successor, Lyndon B. Johnson.

Other than his political life, Forrestal was a senior partner in Shearman & Sterling and a legal advisor to the state-owned Algerian oil company, Sonatrach during the 1970s. Forrestal also had a role in the German-based Allied Control Council and the U.S.–USSR Trade and Economic Council.

== Biography ==
Forrestal was born in New York City on November 26, 1927, to James Forrestal and Josephine Forrestal. His father served as Secretary of the Navy before becoming the first Secretary of Defense in 1947.

In 1946 Michael Forrestal graduated from Phillips Exeter Academy. He received a commission in the United States Navy, and was appointed an assistant naval attaché in Moscow under W. Averell Harriman, the Ambassador to the Soviet Union. He later served as secretary of the Quadripartite Naval Directorate, part of the post-World War II Allied Control Council that administered Berlin. From 1948 to 1950 he was deputy director of the East-West Trade Division of the U.S. European Cooperation Administration.

Forrestal attended Princeton University as a member of the class of 1949, then completed his LL.B. degree at Harvard Law School in 1953. He practiced with the New York City firm of Shearman & Sterling, and became a partner in 1960. By 1978 he had become the firm's senior partner.

== Vietnam War ==
From 1962 to 1965 Forrestal was a member of the senior staff of the National Security Council, where he specialized in Asian affairs and participated in the deliberations and decisions that led to increased U.S. military presence in Vietnam.

In response to President Ngo Dinh Diem's repression of the Buddhist majority, widespread civil disobedience broke out, culminating in nationwide raids on Buddhist temples leaving an estimated death toll in the hundreds. Forrestal, Harriman and Hilsman were prominent among the State Department officials who felt that Diem needed to be removed, and began drafting a response to the raids to send to Ambassador Henry Cabot Lodge Jr. They were the only senior State Department officials on duty on August 24, 1963, a Saturday afternoon, with Defense Secretary Robert McNamara and CIA director John McCone on vacation. President Kennedy was on vacation, when Forrestal telephoned seeking to expedite the process with the commander-in-chief's verbal approval. Kennedy asked them to "wait until Monday" when all the key figures would be in Washington, but Forrestal said that Harriman and Hilsman wanted to get the cable "out right away". Kennedy thus told Forrestal to get another high-ranking official to "get it cleared". The trio then contacted other senior officials, several of whom approved under the misunderstanding that someone else had already cleared the cable. Forrestal phoned Roswell Gilpatric in the evening and told him that both Kennedy and Rusk had already approved. Gilpatric later recalled that "If Rusk went along with it and the President went along with it, I wasn't going to oppose it." Richard Helms of the CIA also endorsed the message without notifying his director McCone; he later said that he believed that Forrestal was only advising of a resolution that had already been made. Forrestal then told Kennedy that he had gained the support of Kennedy's inner circle, so the president told him to send the message. Cable 243 was thus sent to Lodge at 21:36.

Cable 243 called for Lodge to lobby for the removal from influence of Diem's younger brother and chief political adviser Ngo Dinh Nhu, and to look for alternative leadership options if Diem refused. As it was known that Diem would never sideline Nhu, it was effectively an authorisation for Lodge to encourage a military coup.

The decision to authorise the cable prompted significant infighting in the administration at the Monday morning meeting on August 26. Kennedy was met with angry comments by Rusk, McNamara, McCone and Chairman of the Joint Chiefs of Staff General Maxwell Taylor, all of whom denied authorizing the cable. Taylor condemned the cable as an "egregious end run" by an anti-Diem faction. He later claimed that the message was reflective of Forrestal and Hilsman's "well-known compulsion" to remove Diem. and accused them of pulling "a fast one". Kennedy was unhappy at Forrestal for perceived incompetence and angrily criticized Forrestal for proceeding without gaining the explicit approval of McCone, Forrestal offered to resign. Kennedy acerbically replied "You're not worth firing. You owe me something, so you stick around."

Forrestal was a longtime trustee of Phillips Exeter Academy and served as the board's president. In addition, he was a longtime patron of the Metropolitan Opera, and was a member of the Metropolitan Opera Association's executive committee.

== Personal life and death ==
Forrestal died on January 11, 1989, in New York City at the age of 61. He experienced a brain aneurysm while presiding over a meeting of the executive committee of the Metropolitan Opera Association at Lincoln Center. He was taken to Bellevue Hospital Center, where he was pronounced dead. A memorial service was held at St. Thomas Episcopal Church on Fifth Avenue. He was buried in the Arlington National Cemetery in Arlington, Virginia near the graves of his parents and his brother Peter. He neither married nor had any children.
