= Nguyễn Ngọc Lễ =

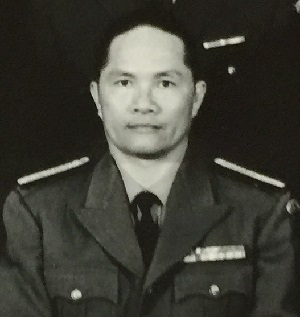

Nguyễn Ngọc Lễ (1918–1972) was an officer in the Army of the Republic of Vietnam. He was also the head of the National Police in the 1950s. Lễ strongly advocated the assassination of President Ngô Đình Diệm and his younger brother and advisor Ngô Đình Nhu after they were arrested at the end of an army coup. Although his army colleagues did not agree with his proposal, the brothers were shot anyway, believed to have been on the orders of General Dương Văn Minh against consensus.

== See also ==
- Arrest and assassination of Ngo Dinh Diem
- 1963 South Vietnamese coup
