= Times of Vietnam =

English-language Vietnamese newspaper

The Times of Vietnam is a defunct English language newspaper that existed in South Vietnam under the rule of President Ngô Đình Diệm.

Regarded as the official mouthpiece of the Diệm regime, the Times was disbanded following the 1963 South Vietnamese coup and the President's subsequent assassination on 2 November 1963. The newspaper's last publication was the 1 November morning edition, as its offices were set ablaze by anti-Diệm rioters during the coup that began later that afternoon.

The paper was published by Gene and Ann Gregory. They were the two Americans closest, both personally and through business connections, to Madame Nhu.
