= 1963 South Vietnamese coup d'état =

Military overthrow of President Ngô Đình Diệm

- Part of the Buddhist crisis of the Vietnam War
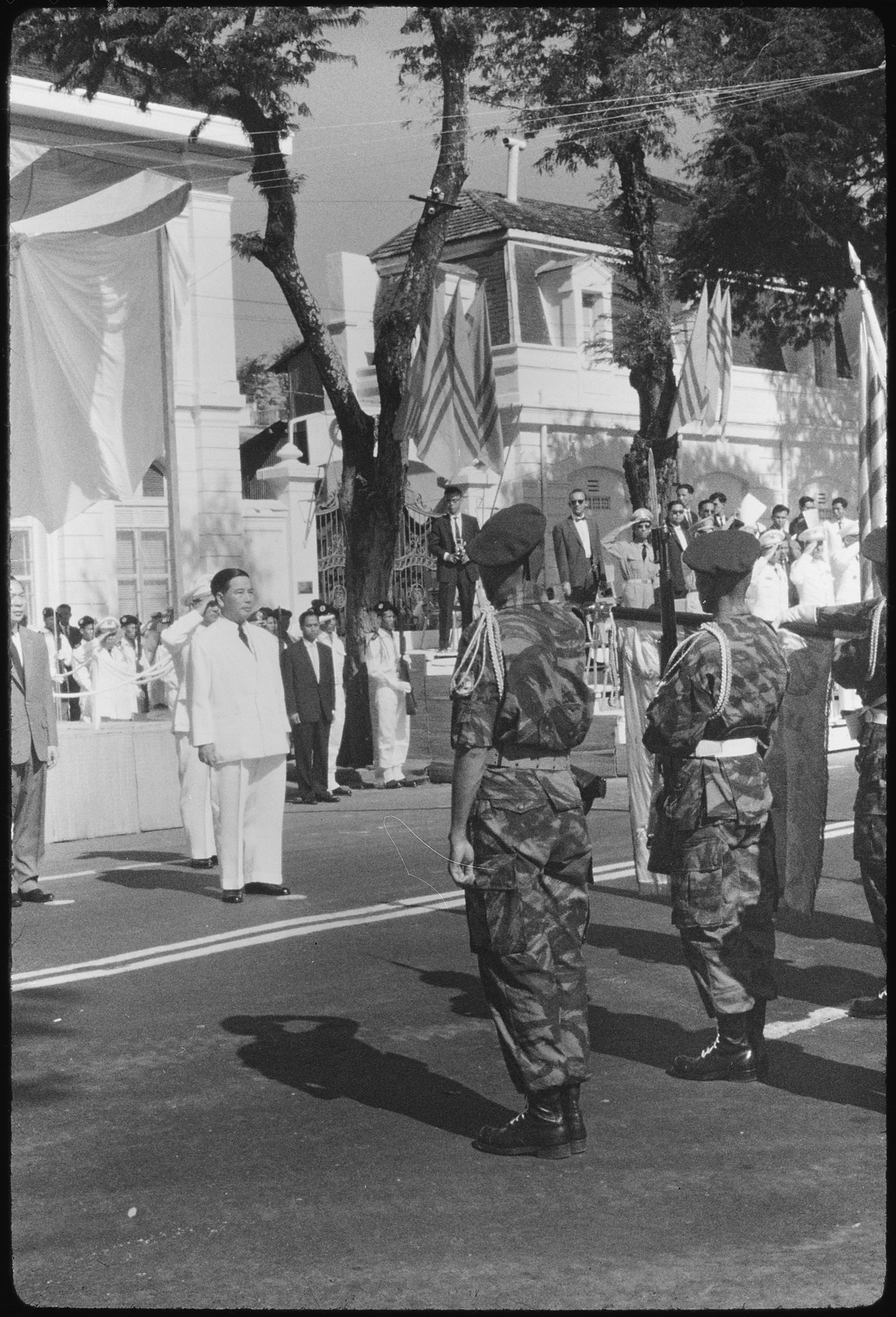
- President Diệm of South Vietnam, deposed in a coup
| Date | 1–2 November 1963 |
| Location | Saigon, South Vietnam 10°47′06″N 106°42′09″E |
| Result | Coup successful; Military Revolutionary Council takes power; political prisoners released; Establishment of the provisional government; Ngô Đình Diệm and Nhu (brother) arrested and assassinated, Lê Quang Tung and Hồ Tấn Quyền summarily executed; Ngô Đình Cẩn arrested; tried and executed in May 1964; Dissolution of the Cần Lao Party; End of the Buddhist crisis; South Vietnam becomes weakened and heavily dependent on the United States |

Belligerents
| Republic of Vietnam Military Forces rebels; Joint General Staff; Army of the Republic of Vietnam rebels; 5th Division; I Corps; III Corps; Capital Military Zone Unit; Republic of Vietnam Marine Division; Republic of Vietnam Airborne Division; Republic of Vietnam Air Force rebels; Supported by: United States: Caravelle Manifesto Group; Vietnam Nationalist Party; Đại Việt Nationalist Party | Diệm administration; National Assembly; Ministry of National Defense; ARVN loyalists; Presidential Guard; Army of the Republic of Vietnam Special Forces; Republic of Vietnam Navy; Republic of Vietnam Air Force; Cần Lao Party; Central Intelligence Office; Pro-government political organizations: National Revolutionary Movement; Republican Youth Union; Republican Youth Movement |

Commanders and leaders
| Trần Văn Đôn; Dương Văn Minh; Nguyễn Văn Thiệu; Lê Văn Kim; Tôn Thất Đính; Nguyễn Hữu Có; Mai Hữu Xuân; Đỗ Mậu; Trần Thiện Khiêm; Trần Văn Minh; Phạm Xuân Chiểu; Lê Văn Nghiêm; Đỗ Cao Trí; Nguyễn Khánh; Dương Hiếu Nghĩa; Phạm Ngọc Thảo (spy of North Vietnam); Đỗ Khắc Mai; Nguyễn Cao Kỳ; Nguyễn Ngọc Loan; Henry Cabot Lodge Jr. Lucien Conein Phan Khắc Sửu; Trần Văn Hương; Trần Văn Đỗ; Phan Huy Quát | Ngô Đình Diệm X Ngô Đình Nhu X Ngô Đình Cẩn (executed); Nguyễn Đình Thuần; Nguyễn Văn Y Phan Quang Đông (executed); Huỳnh Văn Cao; Bùi Dzinh; Huỳnh Văn Lạc (POW); Lê Quang Tung (executed); Hồ Tấn Quyền (executed); Huỳnh Hữu Hiền (POW); Trương Vĩnh Lễ; Trần Chánh Thành |

Strength
| Two battalions of the 5th Division; Two marine battalions Two airborne battalions Miscellaneous trainee units and air force aircraft | ~150 men of the Presidential Guard; ARVN Special Forces |

Casualties and losses
| 5 dead 46 wounded | 9 dead 44 wounded 2 prisoners |
- Civilians: 20 dead, 146 wounded

On 1 November 1963, President Ngô Đình Diệm and the Personalist Labor Revolutionary Party of the Republic of Vietnam (South Vietnam) were deposed by a group of CIA-backed Army of the Republic of Vietnam officers who disagreed with Diệm's handling of the Buddhist crisis and the North Vietnamese-Viet Cong (VC) threat to South Vietnam. During South Vietnam's later years, some referred to the coup as Cách mạng 1-11-1963 (The 1st November 1963 Revolution).

The Kennedy administration had been aware of the coup planning, but Cable 243 from the United States Department of State to U.S. Ambassador to South Vietnam Henry Cabot Lodge Jr. stated that it was U.S. policy not to try to stop it. Lucien Conein, the Central Intelligence Agency's liaison between the U.S. Embassy and the coup planners, told them that the U.S. would not intervene to stop it. Conein also provided 3 million Vietnamese piastres (approx. $42,000 USD) to reward military units that joined the coup. The decision to support the coup stemmed from the Kennedy administration's growing conviction that Diem was incapable of uniting the South Vietnamese people against communism. Diem's government was also increasingly seen as repressive, particularly after his violent crackdown on Buddhist protests.

The coup was led by General Dương Văn Minh and started on 1 November 1963. It proceeded smoothly, for many loyalist leaders were captured after being caught off-guard, and casualties were light. Diệm was captured and assassinated the next day, along with his brother and advisor Ngô Đình Nhu.

== Background ==
Diệm's road to political power began on 16 June 1954, when former emperor Bảo Đại, serving as Head of State, appointed him Prime Minister of the State of Vietnam in recognition of his strong anti-communist and anti-colonialist stance. He accepted the position of Prime Minister because on June 4th, France had recognized the complete independence of the State of Vietnam.

The two, however, became embroiled in a power struggle after Vietnam was divided in July. The issue was brought to a head when Diệm scheduled a referendum for October 1955, which was rigged by his brother Nhu, and proclaimed himself the President of the newly created Republic of Vietnam. He proceeded to strengthen his autocratic and nepotistic rule over the country. A rubber-stamp legislature wrote a constitution that gave Diệm the power to create laws by decree and arbitrarily give himself emergency powers. Dissidents, both communist and nationalist, were jailed and executed in the thousands, and elections were routinely rigged. Opposition candidates were threatened with being charged for conspiring with the North Vietnamese People's Army of Vietnam, which carried the death penalty, and in many areas, large numbers of Army of the Republic of Vietnam (ARVN) troops were sent to stuff ballot boxes. Diệm kept the control of the nation firmly within the hands of his family, and promotions in the ARVN were given on the basis of loyalty rather than merit. Two unsuccessful attempts were made to depose Diệm; in 1960, a paratrooper revolt was quashed after Diệm stalled for negotiations to buy time for loyalists to put down the coup attempt, while a 1962 palace bombing by two Republic of Vietnam Air Force (RVNAF) pilots failed to kill him.

By 1963, many but not the majority of Buddhists in South Vietnam had grown resentful of Diệm's perceived favoritism toward Catholics. Allegedly, public servants had been promoted on the basis of religious preference, and government contracts, land, and business favors were preferentially given to Catholics. The Catholic Church was the largest landowner in the country, and its holdings were exempt from land reform (i.e., appropriation). In the countryside, Catholics were de facto exempt from performing corvée labor. In 1957, Diệm dedicated the nation to the Virgin Mary.

Discontent with Diệm and Nhu exploded into mass protest during mid-1963 when nine Buddhists died at the hand of Diệm's army and police on Vesak, the birthday of Gautama Buddha. In response, the US government was concerned that it might be "impossible for the Diem/Nhu government to succeed and for us [the United States] to continue to support them". The response by Ambassador Frederick Nolting was, "We should take it slow and easy and see if we can live with the Diem government." As a result of this potential inability to support the Diem/Nhu government, the United States government discussed a proposed coup. In a telegram to the American Embassy in Saigon, U.S. Assistant Secretary of State Roger Hilsman says that at some point, were the US to require "political liquidation" in South Vietnam, it should also "urgently examine all possible alternative leadership and make detailed plans as to how we might bring about Diem's replacement if this should become necessary". In May 1963, a law against the flying of religious flags was selectively enforced; the Buddhist flag was banned from display on Vesak, while the Vatican flag was displayed to celebrate the anniversary of the consecration of Archbishop Pierre Martin Ngô Đình Thục, Diệm's brother. Many Buddhists defied the ban and a protest was ended when government forces opened fire. With Diệm remaining intransigent in the face of escalating Buddhist demands for religious equality, sections of society began calling for his removal from power.

The key turning point came shortly after midnight on 21 August, when Nhu's ARVN Special Forces raided and vandalized Buddhist pagodas across the country, arresting thousands of monks and causing a death toll estimated to be in the hundreds. Numerous coup plans had been explored by the army before, but the plotters intensified their activities with increased confidence after the administration of US President John F. Kennedy authorized the US embassy to explore the possibility of a leadership change through Cable 243. They felt Diệm's policies were making their allied regime in Vietnam politically unsustainable.

== Conspiracies ==
There were many conspiracies against Diệm in 1963, many by different cliques of military officers independent from one another. According to the historian Ellen Hammer, there were "perhaps as many as six and possibly more" different plots, and these spanned the gamut of society to include civilian politicians, union leaders, and university students.

=== Plotting by mid-level officers ===
In mid-1963, one group was composed of mid-level officers such as colonels, majors, and captains. Colonel Đỗ Mậu, director of military security, was in this group, which was coordinated by Trần Kim Tuyến, South Vietnam's director of intelligence. Tuyến had been a palace insider, but a rift had developed in recent years, and he began plotting as early as 1962. As South Vietnam was a police state, Tuyến was a powerful figure and had many contacts. Another person in this group was Colonel Phạm Ngọc Thảo, an undetected communist agent who was deliberately fomenting infighting among the officers and mismanaging the Strategic Hamlet Program in order to destabilise the Saigon government.

Tuyến's group had many officers who were members of the opposition Việt Nam Quốc Dân Đảng and Đại Việt Quốc Dân Đảng, who had been discriminated against on issues of promotions, which were preferentially given to members of the regime's Cần Lao Party, a secret Catholic organisation responsible for maintaining Diệm's grip on power. These officers included commanders of airborne, marine and tank units from the 5th Division, mostly at battalion level.

When Tuyến's machinations were uncovered, he was exiled by Nhu. Mậu and Thảo took over but their initial coup plans for 15 July were shelved when American CIA officer Lucien Conein instructed Thảo's superior, General Trần Thiện Khiêm, the head of the ARVN, to stop the coup on the grounds that it was premature. Thảo and Mậu's group resumed plotting, intending to move on 24 October and they recruited a total of 3000 men. They augmented their forces with an assortment of officers from auxiliary units such as from the Signal Corps, Transportation Corps and some RVNAF pilots. Mậu enlisted the help of Khiêm following Tuyến's departure into exile. Mậu gained the cooperation of an assortment of military and civilian dissidents known as the Military and Civilian Front for the Revolution in Vietnam (MCFRV). The MCFRV had started to plot independently in August and their leader was a cousin of Mậu.

Thảo's 24 October coup was canceled after senior officers decided that their younger colleagues could not succeed without the help of General Tôn Thất Đính, a loyalist who controlled the III Corps. The generals sabotaged the younger officers by ordering one of their key regiments into the countryside to fight the communists. The younger officers' plot was integrated into the generals' larger group, and because Khiêm and Mậu were involved with both groups.

After the coup was completed, the media learned that the conspiracy organised by Tuyến and Thảo had been more advanced than that of the generals' before the latter were integrated into the main plot. General Trần Văn Đôn threatened to have the younger officers arrested but Mậu intervened to protect them.

=== Plotting by the generals ===
Following the Xá Lợi Pagoda raids, the senior generals started their own plot in earnest, having only had vague plans prior to this. General Đôn, nominally a high-ranking general, but in a position without command of troops since the palace distrusted him, was sought out by Mậu, who wanted to collaborate. Mậu later accompanied the ranking general in the plot, Dương Văn Minh, on recruitment campaigns. Despite his high rank, Minh was out of favour and served as the Presidential Military Advisor, a meaningless desk job where he had no subordinates in the field and no access to soldiers. Mậu helped Minh to secure the cooperation of General Nguyễn Khánh, who commanded the II Corps that oversaw the Central Highlands of the country, and Colonel Nguyễn Văn Thiệu, who commanded the 5th Division based just outside the capital in Biên Hòa. According to Thiệu, Mậu and Minh had promised to establish a more strongly anti-communist government and to keep Diệm as a figurehead president.

==== Recruitment of Đính ====
The generals knew that without the cooperation of General Đính, a coup would be difficult as his III Corps forces oversaw the region surrounding the capital. Regarded by his peers as ambitious, vain and impulsive, Đính was a favorite of the Ngô family, and headed the military wing of the Cần Lao Party. Đính converted to Catholicism as Diệm trusted his co-religionists and promoted officers based on loyalty and not competence. Đính was known mainly for his drunken presence in Saigon's nightclubs, and the CIA labeled him a "basic opportunist".

Đính privately claimed responsibility for the pagoda attacks, stating to a journalist, "I have defeated Henry Cabot Lodge [the US ambassador to South Vietnam]. He came here to stage a coup d'état, but I, Tôn Thất Đính, have conquered him and saved the country." During this period, Đính claimed he was "a great national hero". His ego had been played upon by the Ngô brothers, who reiterated this point and paid him a large cash bonus after the pagoda raids. In the heady times after the attacks, Đính told his American advisors that "he was without doubt the greatest general officer in the ARVN, the saviour of Saigon ... and soon he would be the top military man in the country".

In a press conference soon after, Đính claimed to have saved South Vietnam from "foreign adventurers", a euphemism for the United States. After being questioned sharply, Đính quickly became angry. Ray Herndon of United Press International (UPI) asked him to name the country that he was referring to, but Đính dodged the question. Herndon lampooned him by saying that a national hero should be able to identify the national enemy, and asked him to call Madame Nhu, the country's First Lady known for her anti-American comments, to get help in identifying the hostile country in question. After several reporters derisively laughed at his comments, Đính angrily stormed out of the conference hurling vulgarities at the newsmen in both English and Vietnamese.

Đính returned to the officers' mess at the Joint General Staff (JGS) headquarters and his colleagues attempted to play on Đính's ego to convince him to join their plot. In a series of meetings, the other generals assured Đính that he was a national hero worthy of political authority, and claimed that Nhu had not realised how important he was in the future of the country. Đính's colleagues even bribed his soothsayer to predict his elevation to political power. The other generals told him that the people were dissatisfied with Diệm's cabinet and that Vietnam needed dynamic young officers in politics, and that their presence would reverse the declining morale in the ARVN. They advised Đính to ask Diệm to promote him to Interior Minister, Dương Văn Minh to Defence Minister, and Trần Văn Minh to Education Minister.

Đính and his fellow generals met Diệm at the palace, where Đính asked the president to promote him to the post of Interior Minister. Diệm bluntly chastised Đính in front of his colleagues, and ordered him out of Saigon to the Central Highlands resort town of Đà Lạt to rest. Đính was humiliated and embarrassed, having promised his colleagues he would be successful. The Ngô brothers had been alarmed by Đính's request, and put him under surveillance. Đính found out, further straining his relationship with the palace. Đính agreed to join the coup, although with his ambitious nature, the other officers were skeptical and planned to have him assassinated if he tried to switch sides. Without Đính's troops, the coup would not have been possible.

=== Nhu's counter-plot ===
By mid-October, Diệm and Nhu were aware that a group of ARVN generals and colonels were planning a coup, but did not know that Đính was firmly among them, although they grew wary of him after his request for a cabinet post.

Nhu then made a plan to outwit the generals with a counter-plot. The generals heard of this, and decided that they had to counteract him. The other generals were still suspicious of Đính and whether he would betray them to the palace. Having found out that Đính would be recruited for Nhu's plan, and not sure which side he was really on, they promised to make him Interior Minister and other rewards if they helped to overthrow the Ngô family. Having gained a reassurance from Đính, the generals placated the younger officers, whose coup had been integrated into their plans.

As part of the generals' plot, Đính sent Colonel Nguyễn Hữu Có, his deputy corps commander, to Mỹ Tho to talk to the 7th Division commander, Colonel (later Major General) Bùi Đình Đạm, and two regimental commanders, the armoured unit commander, both of the 7th Division, and the Mỹ Tho region provincial chief. Exhorting them to join the coup on the grounds that Diệm's regime was unable to keep the military going forward, he stated that all the generals except Cao were in the plot, while Đính was going to do so. According to one account, Đính intended for loyalists to report Có's activities to Diệm and Nhu so that it would give him an opportunity to orchestrate a stunt to ingratiate himself with the palace.

Nhu's agents heard of the conversation and reported to the palace. When the Ngô brothers confronted Đính with the report of what had happened in Mỹ Tho, Đính feigned astonishment at his deputy's behaviour. He began crying, and said:

This is my fault, because you have suspected me. I have not really gone to work for the last 15 days but have stayed at home because I was sad. But I am not against you. I was sad because I thought I was discredited with you. So Nguyễn Hữu Có profited from my absence to make trouble.

Đính claimed to know nothing of Có's activities, raising his voice, vowing to have his deputy killed. Nhu opposed this and stated that he wanted Có alive to catch the plotters, and tried to use Đính to achieve this. Despite their distrust of Đính, the Ngô brothers told them this was not the case and that they would promote him. Nhu ordered Đính and Tung, both of whom took their orders directly from the palace instead of the ARVN command, to plan a fake coup against the Ngô family. One of Nhu's objectives was to trick dissidents into joining the false uprising so that they could be identified and eliminated. Another objective of the public relations stunt was to give the public a false impression of the strength of the Ngô regime.

Codenamed "Operation Bravo", the first stage of the scheme would involve some of Tung's loyalist soldiers, disguised as insurgents led by apparently renegade junior officers, faking a coup and vandalising the capital. During the orchestrated chaos of the first coup, the disguised loyalists would riot and in the ensuing mayhem, kill the leading coup plotters, such as Generals Dương Văn Minh, Trần Văn Đôn, Lê Văn Kim and junior officers that were helping them. The loyalists and some of Nhu's underworld connections were also to kill some figures who were assisting the conspirators, such as the titular but relatively powerless Vice President Nguyễn Ngọc Thơ, CIA agent Lucien Conein, who was on assignment in South Vietnam as a military adviser, and Lodge. Buddhist and student dissident leaders would also be targeted. These would be blamed on "neutralist and pro-communist elements". Tung would then announce the formation of a "revolutionary government" consisting of opposition activists who had not consented to being named in the government, while Diệm and Nhu would pretend to be on the run and move to Vũng Tàu. A fake "counter-coup" was to follow, whereby Tung's men, having left Saigon on the pretext of fighting the Viet Cong (VC), as well as Đính's forces, would triumphantly re-enter Saigon to reaffirm the Diệm regime. Nhu would then round up opposition figures.

Đính, now a double agent, was put in charge of the fake coup and was allowed the additional control of the 7th Division, which was previously assigned to Diệm loyalist General Huỳnh Văn Cao, who was in charge of the IV Corps in the Mekong Delta. The reassignment of the 7th Division to Đính gave his III Corps complete encirclement of Saigon. The encirclement would prevent Cao from storming the capital to save Diệm as he had done during the 1960 coup attempt. This arrangement was supposed to make Đính's task of serving the regime easier, but it was exploited to bring down the Ngô family.

Nhu and Tung remained unaware of Đính's allegiance to the rebels, and were fooled. Đính told Tung that the fake coup needed to employ an overwhelming amount of force. He said that tanks were required "because armour is dangerous". Đính said that fresh troops were needed in the capital, opining, "If we move reserves into the city, the Americans will be angry. They'll complain that we're not fighting the war. So we must camouflage our plan by sending the special forces out to the country. That will deceive them." Nhu had no idea that Đính's real intention was to engulf Saigon with rebel units and lock Tung's loyalists in the countryside where they could not defend the Ngôs.

Nhu's coup would take place on 1 November, All Saints' Day, when Catholics prepare for All Souls' Day, which is the following day. This was so that troops could move freely through the streets, which would be carrying less traffic. The generals decided to start their real coup on the same day to try to exploit Đính's liaison with Nhu.

Colonel Đỗ Mậu, one of the conspirators, concocted military intelligence reports with false data that claimed that the VC were massing outside the capital for an offensive. He convinced Diệm and Nhu to send the special forces out of the capital to fight the VC. Tung and Nhu agreed to send all four Saigon-based special forces companies out of Saigon on 29 October.

Another of Diệm's brothers, Ngô Đình Cẩn, began to suspect Mậu and told the palace, which told army chief General Khiêm to have Mậu arrested. However, Khiêm, who was also part of the plot, deliberately procrastinated, and Mậu remained free. In the meantime, it was too late for the brothers to bring their loyalists back into the capital.

Not trusting Có, Diệm put Colonel Lâm Văn Phát in command of the 7th Division on 31 October. According to tradition, Phát had to pay the Corps' commander a courtesy visit before assuming control of the division. Đính refused to see Phát and told him to come back on Friday at 14:00, by which time the coup would have been in progress. In the meantime, Đính had Đôn sign a counter-order transferring command of the 7th Division to Có.

== Rebel troop movements in and around Saigon ==
The insurgent plans were based on three main task forces. The first consisted of two battalions of marines and a company of M113 armored personnel carriers (APCs). Two battalions of airborne troops regarded as being pro-Diệm were moved to Bình Dương Province to the north of the capital and replaced with the two marine battalions. The marines and the paratroopers were South Vietnam's strategic reserve and were usually deployed near Saigon for protecting the regime against any coups.

Another task force consisted of the 6th Airborne Battalion, which was based in Vũng Tàu around 70 km southwest of the capital, and a trainee battalion, supplemented by 12 APCs from the armor school at Long Hải. The final task force consisted of the 2nd Battalion, 9th Regiment and the 2nd Battalion, 7th Regiment of the 5th Division of Colonel Thiệu. The troops involved in the operations in Saigon began preparing to move into the capital on the evening before the coup and in the early morning. The second task force moved in from the southeast and converged with the other two moving in from the north, and some rebel elements from the 7th Division from the southwest.

By noon, thousands of rebel soldiers had assembled on the city's outskirts, checking equipment and weapons and receiving last-minute orders. Three marine battalions in tanks and armored cars had moved toward the Saigon city center to spearhead the revolt, and some of the 7th Division had arrived from the Mekong Delta to cut the main road from the south into Tân Sơn Nhứt Air Base. The enlisted men did not know the truth behind their mission, nor did many lower-ranking officers; the senior officers told them that they were crushing a police revolt. One airborne lieutenant was suspicious, and as they moved into the suburbs, a colonel revealed that their objective was the Cộng Hòa barracks of the Presidential Guard. When the lieutenant asked "Who is the enemy and who our friend?", the colonel retorted that "Anyone who opposes us is the enemy".

The task forces were used to man various parts of the city, guarding the howitzers to be used in the siege of loyalist installations, and to protect the headquarters of Colonel Thiệu. Đính had 20 tanks brought to his III Corps headquarters at Camp Lê Văn Duyệt. In all, the conspirators had 40 tanks and armoured personnel carriers.

== Lodge, Harkins and Felt meet with Diệm ==
At 10:00 on 1 November, Lodge, Military Assistance Command, Vietnam (MACV) commander General Paul D. Harkins and Admiral Harry D. Felt, the commander of US forces in the Pacific region, were invited to Gia Long Palace by Diệm. Đôn had scheduled the meeting for the visiting Felt at that time to keep Diệm occupied as the troops were moved in and to keep the president in Saigon.

They were accompanied by Đôn, whose desk job meant that his duties consisted mainly of meeting visiting military dignitaries. Diệm gave one of his chain-smoking monologues and said that he would cooperate with US recommendations. According to Lodge, however, Diệm was more direct and to the point than usual. Diệm recounted to Felt about the Ngô family's achievements, then complained about American aid cuts in response to the pagoda raids. He blamed the generals, claiming they had attacked the Buddhists, not the special forces, and claimed Tung's men were now under ARVN control and not used as a private army, which was false. Diệm also claimed that aid cutbacks had hindered the army and led to food shortages.

At one stage, Diệm said "I know there is going to be a coup attempt, but I don't know who is going to do it", to which Lodge purportedly replied "I don't think that there is anything to worry about". Diệm then asked Lodge to talk to officials in Washington about Nhu's future; Diệm was still refusing to remove his brother from authority. He said "Please tell President Kennedy I am a good and frank ally, that I would rather be frank and settle questions than talk about them after we have lost everything. Tell President Kennedy that I take all his suggestions very seriously and wish to carry them out but it is a question of timing." Lodge did not discuss anything specific with regards to a regime change, but claimed that he was not worried by rumors that Diệm and Nhu had wanted to assassinate him. Lodge expressed his "admiration and personal friendship" and gratitude for Diệm's hospitality.

As Harkins and Felt prepared to leave, Diệm took Lodge aside for an individual discussion and repeatedly asked what the Americans wanted, repeating his request for 20 minutes. This was a trick on Diệm's part, for the fake coup was about to begin. In reference to a United Nations inquiry over his repression of the Buddhists, Diệm claimed that Buddhists had been brainwashed by the Americans. Diệm claimed he had closed the pagodas because among the students were communists about to throw grenades and perpetrate bombings during the UN visit. The president also claimed that some Americans were planning a coup against him and promised to give Lodge names. The American ambassador replied with a poker face that he was committed to removing any of his countrymen who were involved in plotting, even though he was doing so himself. Lodge was not taken in by Diệm, as Washington had already told Diệm what reforms were necessary, such as the removal of Nhu and the use of the special forces to fight communists rather than dissidents; Diệm had not responded to US advice. Lodge knew that the real coup was in the offing and did not want to stop it, even if Diệm's overtures were genuine.

Felt was unaware of impending events—as was Harkins—and hurried to Tân Sơn Nhứt Air Base for his noon flight. Before leaving, he held a press conference with Harkins and Đôn while the rebels were rolling into the city. Harkins spoke about the military situation with optimism; on the morning of the coup, the front page of the Stars and Stripes, a military newspaper, featured a piece with Harkins' sunny outlook, entitled "Viet Victory Near". While Felt and Harkins were talking, the officers were preparing to launch the coup at a lunchtime meeting at military headquarters next to the airport. Thinking of the situation, Đôn kept glancing at his watch while waiting for Felt to fly out. The three men were standing as they talked, and Đôn, overcome by nerves, chewed his gum "like a threshing machine", and could not stand still, frequently changing his footing as he talked. After Felt left, the runway was closed, and Đôn brushed off Harkins and quickly went away to get ready for the coup.

Up to the last minute, Harkins and Felt remained unaware of the imminent coup, despite Đôn's fidgety behaviour. The pair had paid a visit to Đôn to discuss military issues at 09:15, but instead of the Vietnamese general hosting his American visitors at JGS headquarters, as was the norm, Đôn went to the MACV office. Although Felt was surprised, the Americans did not realise the reason for the unusual venue and then pointed at a map and wondered why two airborne battalions appeared to be idling. Đôn replied that they were going into battle, and Harkins nodded, unaware that they were entering Saigon. Harkins had told the generals earlier that he opposed a coup, so Đôn avoided the topic. Felt had been told of the existence of coup plans by Lodge, who falsely informed him that such action was not imminent, saying "There isn't a Vietnamese general with hair enough on his chest to make it go." Felt later said that Đôn appeared to be calm and composed.

== Final preparations ==
=== Distrust ===
On the morning of the coup, there was still some trepidation among the plotters. Khiêm approached Đính and asked him to keep their conversation confidential. After the III Corps commander agreed, Khiêm claimed that he wanted to cancel the coup, saying "Đính, I think we still have time to talk to the old man. I don't want to hurt him. Have pity on him!" Đính contemplated the situation and said that he would still proceed with the overthrow. Khiêm reported this to Đôn, and claimed that he had placed Chinese medicinal oil into his eyes to irritate and redden them and thus give the appearance he had become remorseful about the coup, in order to test Đính's loyalty to the plot.

Both Minh and Đôn were wary of Khiêm and Đính up to the last minute, as the latter were both Catholics who were favourites of the Ngô family, who had been rewarded for their loyalty, rather than competence. Khiêm was Diệm's godson. The other generals remained worried that Đính might switch sides and go through with the second part of Nhu's fake coup. The generals were also concerned that they would not have enough forces to overcome the loyalists.

=== Premature start ===
The first victim of the coup was Captain Hồ Tấn Quyền, Diệm's loyalist Republic of Vietnam Navy (RVNN) commander, who was shot dead on his 36th birthday before noon. There are varying accounts of Quyền's death. According to Stanley Karnow, Quyền had noticed abnormal troop movements and drove off to discuss the matter with a colleague. A jeep of rebel marines followed and intercepted him by overtaking him and blocking the road. Quyền abandoned his vehicle and ran across the open field, but stumbled and fell with the marines in hot pursuit. One of them reached him and shot him in the head point blank. According to Ellen Hammer, however, Quyền started his birthday with an early morning tennis match with fellow officers, who invited him to a lunchtime birthday party. Quyền declined in order to look after his children who were at home alone while his wife was studying in Japan. His deputy, who was part of the plot, followed him home and managed to change Quyền's mind. The two men headed for a restaurant on Saigon's outskirts, and the shooting took place along the way. Historian and author Mark Moyar wrote that Quyền noticed suspicious troop movements near the capital in the morning. As Quyền prepared to go to the palace to alert the Ngô brothers, his deputy shot him dead on the Biên Hòa highway. The generals were immediately informed of the killing and forced to bring forward intended troop movements into Saigon ahead of schedule.

=== Capture of loyalist officers ===
On 1 November, the plotters summoned many senior officers who were not involved in the plot to the JGS headquarters at Tân Sơn Nhứt, on the pretext of a routine lunchtime leadership meeting. Mậu and Đôn organised the invitations and set up the trap. At 13:45, Đôn announced that a coup was taking place. Most of the officers rose to applaud, while those who did not and refused to turn against Diệm were brutally beaten and arrested by their colleagues. Some were subsequently executed. The plotters neutralized many Diệm loyalists in this manner, most notably Colonel Tung, who was brutally beaten and arrested by Captain Nguyễn Văn Nhung, Minh's bodyguard. As he was led away, Tung angrily denounced the generals, shouting "Remember who gave you your stars!"

During the early stages of the coup, the rebels forced Tung to order his men to surrender by putting a pistol to his head and forcing him to make a phone call to his subordinates. This meant that only the Presidential Guard was left to defend Gia Long Palace. At 16:45, Tung was forced at gunpoint to talk to Diệm on the phone, telling the president that he had told his men to stand down, but Tung failed to convince the president to surrender. Minh then ordered Nhung to execute Tung as he still commanded the loyalty of his men. The other generals had little sympathy for the special forces commander as he had disguised his men in army uniforms and framed the generals for the pagoda raids. The generals were well aware of the threat that Tung posed; they had discussed and agreed on his elimination during their planning, having contemplated waging an offensive against Tung's special forces. At nightfall Tung was taken with Major Lé Quang Trieu, his brother and deputy, hands tied, into a jeep and driven to the edge of the air base. Forced to kneel over two freshly dug holes, the brothers were shot into their graves and buried.

Another leading officer who stayed loyal to Diệm was Colonel Cao Văn Viên, commander of the airborne brigade. Viên had been unaware of the plot, and the generals had discussed whether to assassinate him during their planning phase because they knew he was a Diệmist. However, Đính, who played mahjong with Viên's wife, convinced Minh to not have Viên liquidated, and promised that Viên would not oppose the coup. Đính's prediction that Viên would acquiesce was incorrect. Viên "broke down completely" and took off his insignia and handed it to Minh in resignation. He was then brutally beaten and arrested, and subsequently sentenced to death. Viên had planned with Diệm to allow the president to take refuge at his home in the event of a coup, but the offer was moot as rebels surrounded Viên's house after taking him into custody. Viên narrowly avoided execution and was released and returned to command after the coup. General Khang, the commander of the marine brigade, was also brutally beaten and arrested for remaining loyal to Diệm, as was the head of the RVNAF Đỗ Khắc Mai, and the National Police chief.

After the loyalists were taken away, Minh read the coup proclamation and his objectives and taped it and asked the other officers to sign the papers. They then spoke into the recorder, identifying themselves as supporters of the coup. Minh told his subordinates to have copies made of the original, and hid the copies in several places so that his accomplices could not claim that they were not involved if the putsch failed. Minh was to play them over the radio later that day.

== Seizing control of the 7th Division ==
With a group of his personal rebel officers, Có flew by helicopter to Mỹ Tho, the division headquarters, to take command on the morning of the coup. Reaching the Mekong Delta town two hours before the scheduled start of the coup, he held a ceremony for the division's incumbent officers—who thought the change of command was a routine matter—in a local hall. When the coup started, Có's men charged through the doors with automatic weapons and arrested the officers, before taking command. He said "Please remain seated quietly. Anyone who rises will be instantly shot".

Có then phoned Cao, further south in the Mekong Delta's largest town Cần Thơ, where the IV Corps was headquartered. The rebel colonel assured Cao that the divisional and corps transfer had taken place smoothly. Có, a central Vietnamese, was afraid that Cao, a Mekong Delta native, would recognise his fake southern accent, and realize that he was impersonating Phat, another southerner. However, Cao did not notice.

When Cao was informed by his subordinates that there was a coup occurring in the capital, he believed it to be part of the false coup, as he had been told beforehand by Nhu; Cao was one of the regime's most loyal and favored generals and he was going to help stage the second part of Nhu's plan. Cao told one regiments and a few tanks to ready themselves for the second part of the plot. Later, Cao realised it was a genuine coup. He sent the 9th Division under Colonel Bùi Dzinh to move north through Mỹ Tho towards Saigon to save Diệm, but Có had already made plans to cut off any attempt by Cao to relieve Saigon. When Cao radioed the 7th Division in Mỹ Tho, Có identified himself and taunted the corps commander, saying "Didn't you recognise my accent?". Có told the general that he had ordered all the ferries to the Saigon side of the Mekong River, and told Cao not to attempt to cross unless he wanted to die. Seeing that Diệm was lost, Cao later expressed solidarity with the coup.

== Fighting in Saigon ==
The rebels encountered little resistance at the start of the attack on Saigon, and this allowed them to generate momentum. This was primarily due to Diệm and Nhu's complacency and their mistaken assumption that the military action was the start of Operation Bravo. The central police called Diệm, informing him that the marines did not appear to be friendly. It was too late as the rebels captured the police headquarters and shut down the secret police, which were directly controlled by Nhu.

Wearing red scarves for identification, the rebel marines caught the loyalists off guard and took over control of the building of the Interior Ministry and the National Police headquarters. The latter installation was captured by some newly enlisted troops from the Quang Trung National Training Center, led by General Mai Hữu Xuân, who promptly arrested the Diem supporters in the office. The rebels also tried to take control of the Infantry School in Saigon so that they could use the two trainee battalions against Diệm, but the loyalist head of the institution, Colonel Lam Son, foiled their plans.

One of Diệm's aides called Đính but was told that Đính was not there. Diệm and Nhu remained relaxed, confident that it was the phony coup. When security officials noticed the troop movements, a panicked young officer telephoned Nhu, who serenely said. "It's all right, I know about it." The generals timed the coup to trick Nhu and Diệm, who were always paranoid about threats to their power, into believing that the threat was false.

The rebels outnumbered the Diệmists and quickly made inroads against the loyalists, who were caught unawares and confused about whether the coup was real. The generals wanted and needed to finish the operation quickly with as little hand-to-hand combat as possible, as they knew that both factions would have to put aside their differences and regroup to fight the communists after the coup, and because a drawn out mini-civil war would only allow the communists to take over the countryside while the ARVN fought in the capital. Minh had decided to keep the loyalists in their rank afterward if they still wanted to fight the VC. Most of the anti-Diệm forces also wanted to avoid killing the president in a large-scale battle for the palace.

The rebels quickly took control of Tân Sơn Nhứt to control air traffic, and set up checkpoints and defense installations on the cities' outskirts to guard against any counterattack that might come from outside the capital. They also blew up government buildings, and took control of the national post office and Radio Saigon. Four RVNAF AD-6 fighter-bombers roared above the city centre, adding to the confusion and threatening loyalist positions.

Lieutenant Colonel Nguyễn Cao Kỳ, the RVNAF deputy commander, sent two T-28 fighter-bombers over Saigon. They strafed the palace, and fired two rockets while avoiding sporadic black and white clouds of antiaircraft fire. Both shots missed their targets, and the second struck an empty US Marine barracks. At the same time, some fighter-bombers made strafing runs at the RVNN headquarters in the capital, where the defenders remained loyal to Diệm. Some anti-aircraft guns on the RVNN vessels patrolling in the Saigon River returned fire. Around 15 minutes after the start of the coup, radio transmissions were taken off the air, severing communication with those outside Saigon.

Early on during the coup, while the special forces were still fighting before the generals forced Tung to order them to capitulate, one of his subordinates was in Gia Long Palace and made a proposal to Diệm. According to the diary of one of Diệm's aides, the special forces officer drew up and proposed a surprise counter-attack on the rebel headquarters at Tân Sơn Nhứt using loyalist infantry and tanks. Tân Sơn Nhứt was located on the northwestern edge of the city, and the officer said that it was only protected by trainee soldiers. He told Diệm there was no chance that the new recruits could resist a loyalist attack and therefore the generals would be easily captured and the leadership of the coup would break down. The aide reported that Diệm turned down the proposal, saying "The brigade should conserve its forces to fight the communists and avoid bloodshed. In the meantime, it should protect Gia Long Palace, the post office and the treasury." Another aide believed that Diệm did not want to attack the headquarters of the JGS because "it represented the authority of the armed forces" and to avoid "more harm, more death, more suffering for the soldiers". According to this account, Diệm "was confident that his forbearance would make the coup forces realize that he was a president who always stood on the side of the masses of the population".

To stop the loyalist forces near the palace from escaping, armoured and artillery units commanded by Colonel Thiệu placed their tanks and howitzers shoulder-to-shoulder, in preparation for the shelling of the Cộng Hòa barracks of the Presidential Guard, located near the palace. APCs brought more rebel troops with machine guns to surround the Cộng Hòa Barracks, where the defenders were armed with artillery, mortars and machine guns.

Under the command of Thiệu, the siege of the barracks started, and rebel artillery shells soon reduced the buildings to rubble, but the pro-Diệm loyalists fought on, a scant five blocks from the palace. Presidential Guard tanks returned fire, severely damaging nearby roadways. After an hour, Diệm and Nhu suspected that something was amiss and attempted to call Đính's office for a second time and again were told Đính was not there. Not believing Đính had double-crossed them, the Ngô brothers were heard in the background speculating that Đính had been arrested by the rebels. The generals then phoned Gia Long Palace with an ultimatum. If Diệm resigned immediately, he and Nhu would be safely exiled. If he did not, they would launch air strikes and start shelling the palace within the hour. The generals said that there would be no negotiation, only a yes or no would be acceptable. Diệm made no reply.

Shortly after 16:00, Diệm telephoned JGS headquarters. Đôn answered and stated "the time has come when the army must respond to the wishes of the people" because Diệm had failed to reform his leadership. The pair had a robust argument and Diệm asked the commanders to visit him at the palace to negotiate and work on a reform plan. The generals, remembering that he bought time for loyalists to come to his aid during the 1960 coup attempt by stalling the coup with talks and a false promise of reform and power-sharing, turned down his suggestion.

At 16:30, the generals officially announced the coup over national radio, repeating the recorded message at five-minute intervals. Their message called on Diệm and Nhu to give up power, and many officers identified themselves as participants. The recorded pledges made at JGS were also played. Minh said "The day the people have been waiting for has come. For eight years, the people of Vietnam have suffered under the rotten, nepotic Diem regime, but now the armed forces have come to their rescue." It further said "Soldiers in the army, security service, civil defense force, and people's force ... The Ngo Dinh Diem government, abusing power, has thought only of personal ambition and slighted the fatherland's interests ... The army has swung into action. The task of you all is to unite ... The revolution will certainly be successful." The proclamation was endorsed by 14 generals, 7 colonels and a major. It further added that "We have no political ambitions ... We act not for fame or benefit, but to save our beloved fatherland."

However, a technical malfunction interrupted the broadcasts with twist and cha-cha music; under the Diệm regime Madame Nhu had banned dancing and associated music under a series of "morality laws". In the meantime, RVNAF transport planes dropped rebel leaflets over Saigon, asking the population to rally to the anti-Diệm cause. Concurrent to the generals' radio broadcast, Diệm telephoned Lodge at the US Embassy. Diệm angrily shouted in French, and Lodge had to hold the receiver away from his ear. Diệm's voice was loud enough that Lodge's aides could hear the message from a distance. Lodge reported the following exchange to Washington:

Diệm: Some units have made a rebellion and I want to know what is the attitude of the US?
Lodge: I do not feel well enough informed to be able to tell you. I have heard the shooting, but am not acquainted with all the facts. Also it is 4:30 A.M. in Washington and the US government cannot possibly have a view.
D: But you must have some general ideas. After all, I am a chief of state. I have tried to do my duty. I want to do now what duty and good sense require. I believe in duty above all.
L: You have certainly done your duty. As I told you only this morning, I admire your courage and your great contributions to your country. No one can take away from you the credit for all you have done. Now I am worried about your physical safety. I have a report that those in charge of the current activity offer you and your brother safe conduct out of the country if you resign. Had you heard this?
D: No. [pause] You have my telephone number.
L: Yes. If I can do anything for your physical safety, please call me.
D: I am trying to reestablish order.

It later emerged, however, that Lodge had not given a full account of the conversation to his superiors at the State Department. The Australian historian Anne E. Blair said "there can be no doubt that Lodge silenced some of Diệm's rejoinder, supremely confident as he was in his ability to control not only the American press but the official government records as well". Lodge's aide, Frederick Flott, claimed that in the middle of the conversation Lodge offered to send his staff to Diệm's palace to have the Ngô brothers taken to the airport and safely exiled and exhorted him to leave. Lodge wanted to send Flott to the palace in a taxi marked with American flags, to negotiate his way into the building and take the brothers to the airport, where he would be flown aboard an American aircraft to a military base in the Philippines. Diệm mistakenly presumed that Lodge's offer implied American reinforcements against the coup. One account from a US embassy official added the following passage, omitted by Lodge.

Lodge: Well, you are a chief of state. I cannot give you advice, but personally, and as a friend, and as somebody who is concerned about your health, my suggestion would be you think seriously of getting away. Now, if I can be of any help on that, I'm prepared to send my driver with an officer of mine to escort you to safety. And we can get you on my jet aircraft, and I'm sure I can deliver on that. One of my officers will ride in the front seat of my limousine with the chauffeur.
Diệm: No, I cannot agree to fleeing, because this is all a tempest in a teapot; it's a couple of hothead generals who don't speak for the army, and I know that the real troops are loyal to me and will soon have this all straightened out.
L: Well, Mr. President, that is your decision, certainly. I cannot advise you one way or the other. But as I've said, if I can ever be of any assistance in looking after your security, I would certainly do so.
D: Well, I want you to tell Washington that this is being done, and that I want them to land the BLTs [battalion landing teams], the two marine BLTs on the aircraft carriers offshore. I want them to land and protect the palace.

Diệm's bodyguard would claim decades later that the president further said:

Mr. Ambassador, do you realize who you are talking to? I would like you to know that you are talking to the president of an independent and sovereign nation. I will only leave this country if it is the wish of my people. I will never leave according to the request of rebellious generals or of an American ambassador. The US government must take full responsibility before the world for this miserable matter.

Through the afternoon and into the night, the loudspeakers on the grounds of Gia Long Palace carried Diệm's recorded exhortation to loyalists that "We shall not give in". These were mixed with passages of military music. At the same time, the US military ordered units of the Seventh Fleet to move into the waters near Saigon as a "precautionary measure" in case the fighting endangered American lives and to deter an opportunistic communist offensive.

== Siege of Gia Long Palace ==
Gia Long Palace, the presidential mansion, had once served as the home of French governor generals. For security reasons, the surrounding streets were regularly sealed after sunset; the building had several bunkers and an intricate tunnel system, including a half-block-long escape route to the basement of the City Hall. On the morning of 1 November, Diệm had reinforced palace security with more soldiers and barbed-wire barricades. The palace was surrounded by walls of around 2.1 m, and defended by 150 troops of the Presidential Guard. The building was protected by machine and antiaircraft guns and ringed with pillboxes, tanks, and 20-mm cannons mounted on armoured vehicles.

As Diệm refused to surrender, vowing to reassert his control, after sunset, Thiệu led his 7th Division in an assault on Gia Long Palace. They used artillery and flamethrowers and it fell by daybreak after Diệm finally gave the order to the Presidential Guard to surrender. The coup results pleased the anti-Diệmists. The casualties were light: 9 insurgents killed and 46 wounded, 4 dead and 44 injured Presidential Guards. The greatest casualties were from the populace, who suffered 20 deaths and 146 injured.

== I Corps ==
When I Corps commander General Đỗ Cao Trí was informed that coup was imminent, he left Huế on 29 October for Đà Nẵng so that he would be away from Ngô Đình Cẩn, who ruled central Vietnam from Hue for his family. The coup took place on 1 November, and Trí helped to prevent any loyalist actions by causing diversions. He scheduled a meeting with the province chief and other pro-Diệm officials during the time that the coup was to take place. As a result, Diệm loyalists were stuck in a meeting room and were unable to mobilise the Republican Youth and other Ngô family paramilitary and activist groups.

== Surrender and execution of Diệm and Nhu ==
In the early morning of 2 November 1963 Diệm agreed to surrender. The ARVN officers had a meeting intended to exile Diệm and Nhu, having promised the Ngô brothers safe passage out of the country into an "honorable retirement". Not all of the senior officers attended the meeting. General Nguyễn Ngọc Lê strongly lobbied for Diệm's execution. There was no formal vote taken at the meeting, and Lê attracted only minority support. Conein reported that the generals had never indicated that assassination was on their minds, since an orderly transition of power was a high priority in achieving their ultimate aim of gaining international recognition.

Minh and Don asked Conein to secure an American aircraft to take the brothers out of the country. Two days earlier, Lodge had alerted Washington that such a request was likely and recommended Saigon as the departure point. This request put the Kennedy administration in a difficult position, as the provision of an airplane would publicly tie it to the coup. When Conein telephoned the Saigon CIA station, there was a ten-minute wait. The US government would not allow the aircraft to land in any country, unless that state was willing to grant asylum to Diem. The United States did not want Diem and Nhu to form a government in exile, and Assistant Secretary of State Roger Hilsman had written earlier that "Under no circumstances should the Nhus be permitted to remain in Southeast Asia in close proximity to Vietnam because of the plots they will mount to try to regain power. If the generals decide to exile Diem, he should also be sent outside Southeast Asia." He further went on to anticipate what he termed a "Götterdämmerung in the palace".

After surrendering, Diệm rang Lodge and spoke to the American envoy for the last time. Lodge did not report the conversation to Washington, so it was widely assumed that the pair last spoke on the previous afternoon when the coup was just starting. However, after Lodge died in 1985, his aide, Colonel Mike Dunn, said that Lodge and Diệm spoke for the last time at around 07:00 on 2 November, moments after Diệm surrendered. When Diệm called, Lodge "put [him] on hold" and then walked away. Upon his return, the ambassador offered Diệm and Nhu asylum, but would not arrange for transportation to the Philippines until the next day. This contradicted his earlier offer of asylum the previous day when he implored Diệm not to resist the coup. Dunn then offered to personally go to the brothers' hideout to escort him so that the generals could not kill him, but Lodge refused, saying "We just can't get that involved". Dunn said "I was really astonished that we didn't do more for them". Having refused to help the Ngô brothers to leave the country safely, Lodge later said after they had been shot: "What would we have done with them if they had lived? Every Colonel Blimp in the world would have made use of them."

Dunn claimed Lodge put Diệm on hold to inform Conein where the brothers were—they had sneaked out of the palace so that the generals could capture them. When confronted about Dunn's claim by a historian, Conein denied the account. One of Lodge's staff told Conein that the plane would have to go directly to the faraway asylum-offering country, so that the brothers could not disembark at a nearby stopover country and stay there to foment a counter-coup. Conein was told that the nearest plane that was capable of such a long range flight was in Guam, and it would take 24 hours to make the necessary arrangements. Minh was astounded and told Conein that the generals could not hold Diệm for that long. Conein reportedly did not suspect a deliberate delay by the American embassy. In contrast, a United States Senate investigative commission in the early 1970s raised a provocative conundrum: "One wonders what became of the US military aircraft that had been dispatched to stand by for Lodge's departure, scheduled for the previous day."

Minh traveled to Gia Long Palace in a sedan with his aide and bodyguard, Captain Nhung to arrest the Ngô brothers. Minh had also dispatched an APC and four jeeps to Gia Long to transport Diệm and Nhu back to JGS headquarters for the ceremonial handover of power during a nationally televised event witnessed by international media. Diệm and Nhu would then "ask" the generals to be granted exile and asylum in a foreign country, which would be granted.

=== Diệm's escape ===
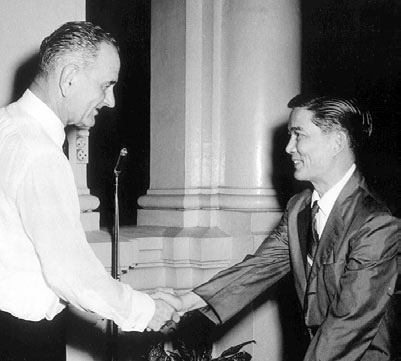
Diệm's brother Ngô Đình Nhu (right), shaking hands with then US Vice President Lyndon B. Johnson in 1961

Minh instead arrived to find that the brothers were missing. In anticipation of a coup, they had ordered the construction of three separate tunnels leading from Gia Long to remote areas outside the palace. At around 20:00 on the previous night, Diệm and Nhu hurriedly packed American banknotes into a briefcase. They escaped through one of the tunnels with two loyalists: Cao Xuân Vy, head of Nhu's Republican Youth, and RVNAF Lieutenant Đỗ Thơ, Diệm's aide-de-camp, who happened to be a nephew of Đỗ Mậu.

Diệm and Nhu emerged in a wooded area in a park near the Cercle Sportif (10.776°N 106.693°E), the city's upper-class sporting club, where they were picked up by a waiting vehicle. Historian Ellen Hammer disputes the tunnel escape, asserting that the Ngô brothers simply walked out of the building, which was not yet under siege. Hammer asserts that they walked past the tennis courts and left the palace grounds through a small gate at Le Thanh Ton Street and entered the car. The loyalists traveled through narrow back streets in order to evade rebel checkpoints and changed vehicles to a black Citroën sedan. After leaving the palace, Nhu was reported to have suggested to Diệm that the brothers split up, arguing this would enhance their chances of survival. Nhu proposed that one of them travel to the Mekong Delta to join Cao's IV Corps, while the other would travel to the II Corps of General Khánh in the Central Highlands. Nhu felt that the rebel generals would not dare to kill one of them while the other was free, in case the surviving brother was to regain power. According to one account, Diệm reportedly turned down Nhu, reasoning that "You cannot leave alone. They hate you too much; they will kill you. Stay with me and I will protect you." Another story holds that Diệm reportedly said "We have always been together during these last years. How could we separate during these last years? How could we separate in this critical hour?" Nhu agreed that they should stay together until the end.

The loyalists reached the home of Ma Tuyen in the Chinese business district of Cholon. Ma Tuyen was a Chinese merchant and friend who was reported to be Nhu's main contact with the Chinese syndicates which controlled the opium trade. The brothers sought asylum from the embassy of the Republic of China, but were turned down and stayed in Ma Tuyen's house as they appealed to ARVN loyalists and attempted to negotiate with the coup leaders. Nhu's secret agents had fitted the home with a direct phone line to the palace, so the insurgent generals believed that the brothers were still besieged inside Gia Long. Neither the rebels nor the loyalist Presidential Guard had any idea that at 21:00 they were about to fight for an empty building, leading to futile deaths. Minh was reported to be mortified when he realised that Diệm and Nhu had escaped in the middle of the night.

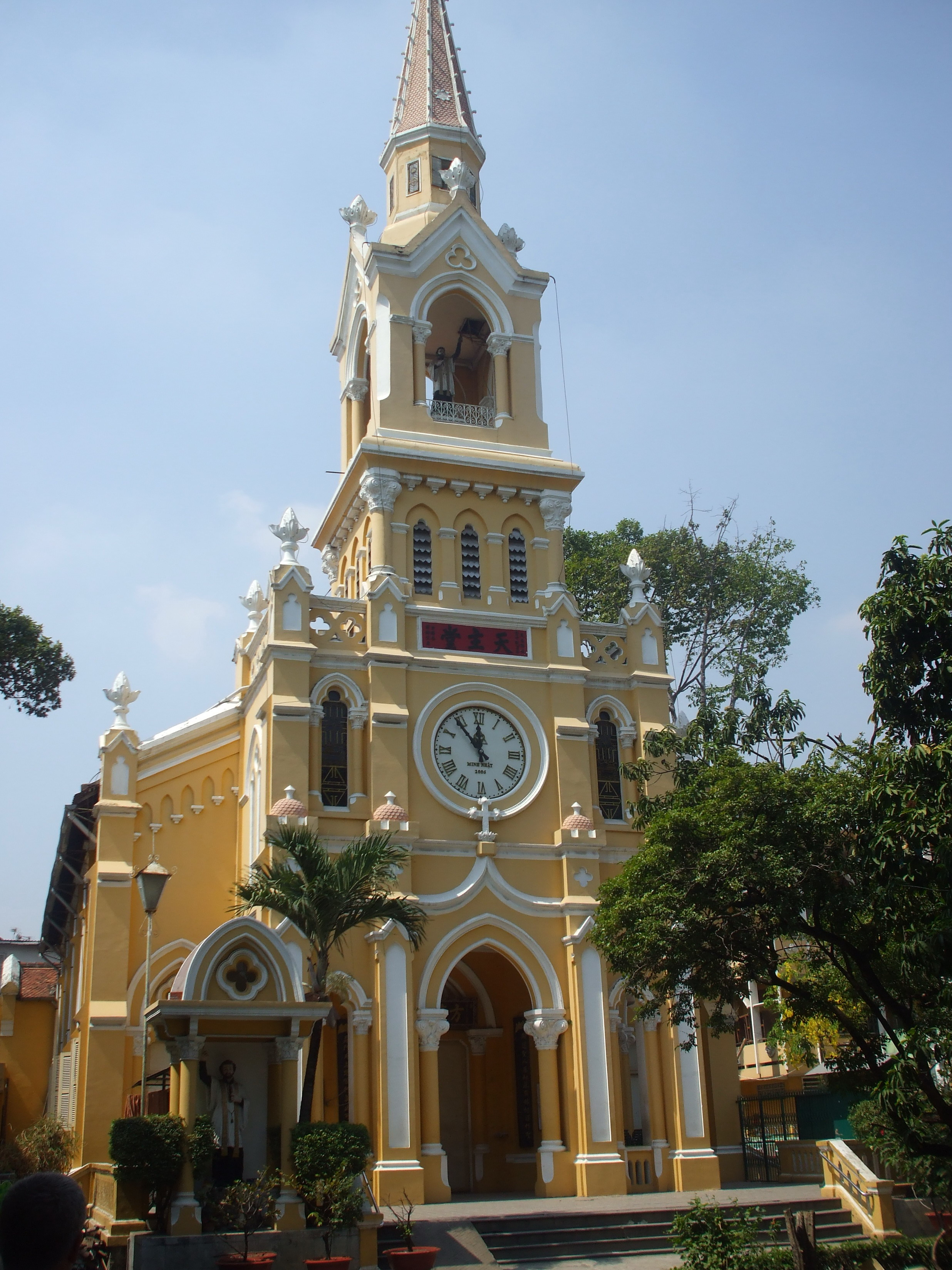
St. Francis Xavier Catholic Church, where the Ngô brothers were arrested.

After Minh had ordered the rebels to search the areas known to have been frequented by the Ngô family, Colonel Phạm Ngọc Thảo was informed by a captured Presidential Guard officer that the brothers had escaped through the tunnels to a refuge in Cholon. Thảo was told by Khiêm to find and prevent Diệm from being killed. When Thảo arrived at Ma Tuyen's house, he phoned his superiors. Diệm and Nhu overheard him and fled to the nearby Catholic Church of St. Francis Xavier (10.752°N 106.654°E). The Ngô brothers walked through the shady courtyard. It was speculated that they were recognised by an informant while they walked through the yard. A few minutes later, just after 10:00, an APC and two jeeps entered.

=== Execution ===
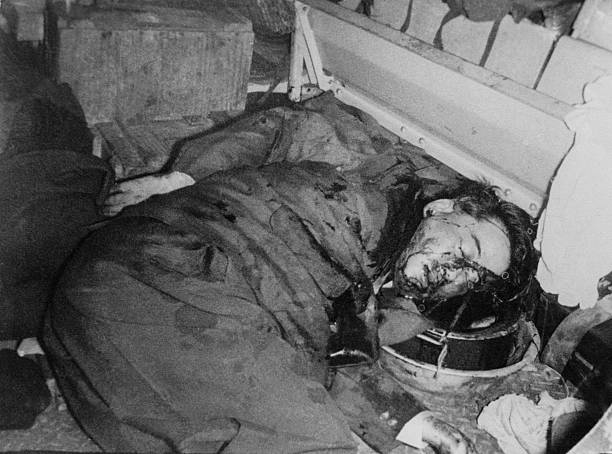
Diệm dead. Initial rumors said that he and his brother committed suicide.

The convoy was led by General Mai Hữu Xuân and consisted of Colonels Quan and Lắm. Quan was Minh's deputy, and Lắm was commander of Diệm's Civil Guard. Lắm had joined the coup once a rebel victory seemed assured. Two further officers made up the convoy: Major Dương Hiếu Nghĩa and Captain Nhung, Minh's bodyguard. Nhu expressed disgust that they were to be transported in an APC, asking "You use such a vehicle to drive the president?" Lắm assured them the armor was for their own protection. Xuân told them it was selected to protect them from "extremists". The brothers' hands were tied behind their backs..

After the arrest, Nhung and Nghĩa sat with the brothers in the APC, and the convoy departed for Tân Sơn Nhứt. Before the convoy departed for the church, Minh reportedly gestured to Nhung with two fingers, which some have claimed was to be taken as an order to kill both brothers. The convoy stopped at a railroad crossing on the return trip, where by all accounts the brothers were killed. An investigation by Đôn later determined that Nghia had shot the brothers at point-blank range with a semi-automatic firearm and that Nhung sprayed them with bullets before repeatedly stabbing the bodies with a knife.

=== Attempted cover-up ===
When the corpses arrived at JGS headquarters, the generals were shocked. Although they despised and had no sympathy for Nhu, they still respected Diệm, and several lost their composure. Đính later declared "I couldn't sleep that night", while Đôn maintained that the generals were "truly grievous", maintaining that they were sincere in their intentions to give a safe exile. Đôn charged Nhu with convincing Diệm to reject the offer. Lodge later concluded that "Once again, brother Nhu proves to be the evil genius in Diệm's life." Đôn ordered another general to tell reporters that the brothers had died in an accident. He went to confront Minh in his office.

- Đôn: Why are they dead?
- Minh: And what does it matter that they are dead?

At this time, Xuân walked into Minh's office through the open door, unaware of Đôn's presence. Xuân snapped to attention and stated "Mission accomplie".

Shortly afterward, the CIA sent word to the White House that Diệm and Nhu were dead, allegedly due to suicide. Vietnam Radio had announced their deaths by poison, and that they had committed suicide while in the APC. Unclear and contradictory stories abounded. General Harkins reported that the suicides had occurred either by gunshot or by a grenade wrestled from the belt of an ARVN officer who was standing guard. Minh tried to explain the discrepancy by saying "Due to an inadvertence, there was a gun inside the vehicle. It was with this gun that they committed suicide."

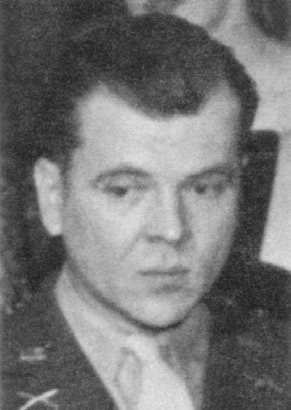
Lucien Conein, the CIA's contact with the ARVN generals

When Kennedy learned of the deaths during a White House meeting, he appeared shaken, and left the room. Kennedy later penned a memo, lamenting that the assassination was "particularly abhorrent" and blaming himself for approving Cable 243, which authorised Lodge to explore coup options in the wake of Nhu's Xá Lợi Pagoda raids. Kennedy's reaction did not draw unanimous sympathy. Through Conein, the Americans later became aware of the true reasons for the deaths of Diệm and Nhu. Later, photos appeared showing the two dead brothers covered in blood on the floor of the APC. The images appeared to be genuine, discrediting the generals' claims that the brothers had committed suicide.

Once the news of the cause of death of the Ngô brothers began to become public, the US became concerned at its association with the new junta and began asking questions. Lodge initially backed the false story disseminated by the generals, believing that the brothers had shot themselves. Lodge showed no alarm in public, congratulating Đôn on the "masterful performance" of the coup and promising diplomatic recognition. Đôn's assertion that the assassinations were unplanned were sufficient for Lodge, who told the State Department that "I am sure assassination was not at their direction." Minh and Đôn reiterated their position in a meeting with Conein and Lodge on the following day. Several members of the Kennedy administration were appalled by the killings, citing them as a key factor in the future leadership troubles which beset South Vietnam. The assassinations caused a split within the leadership of the junta, and repulsed American and world opinion.

The killings damaged the public belief that the new regime would be an improvement over the Ngô family, turning the initial harmony among the generals into discord. The criticism of the killings caused the officers to distrust and battle one another for positions in the new government. According to Jones, "when decisions regarding postcoup affairs took priority, resentment over the killings meshed with the visceral competition over government posts to disassemble the new regime before it fully took form."

=== Culpability debate ===
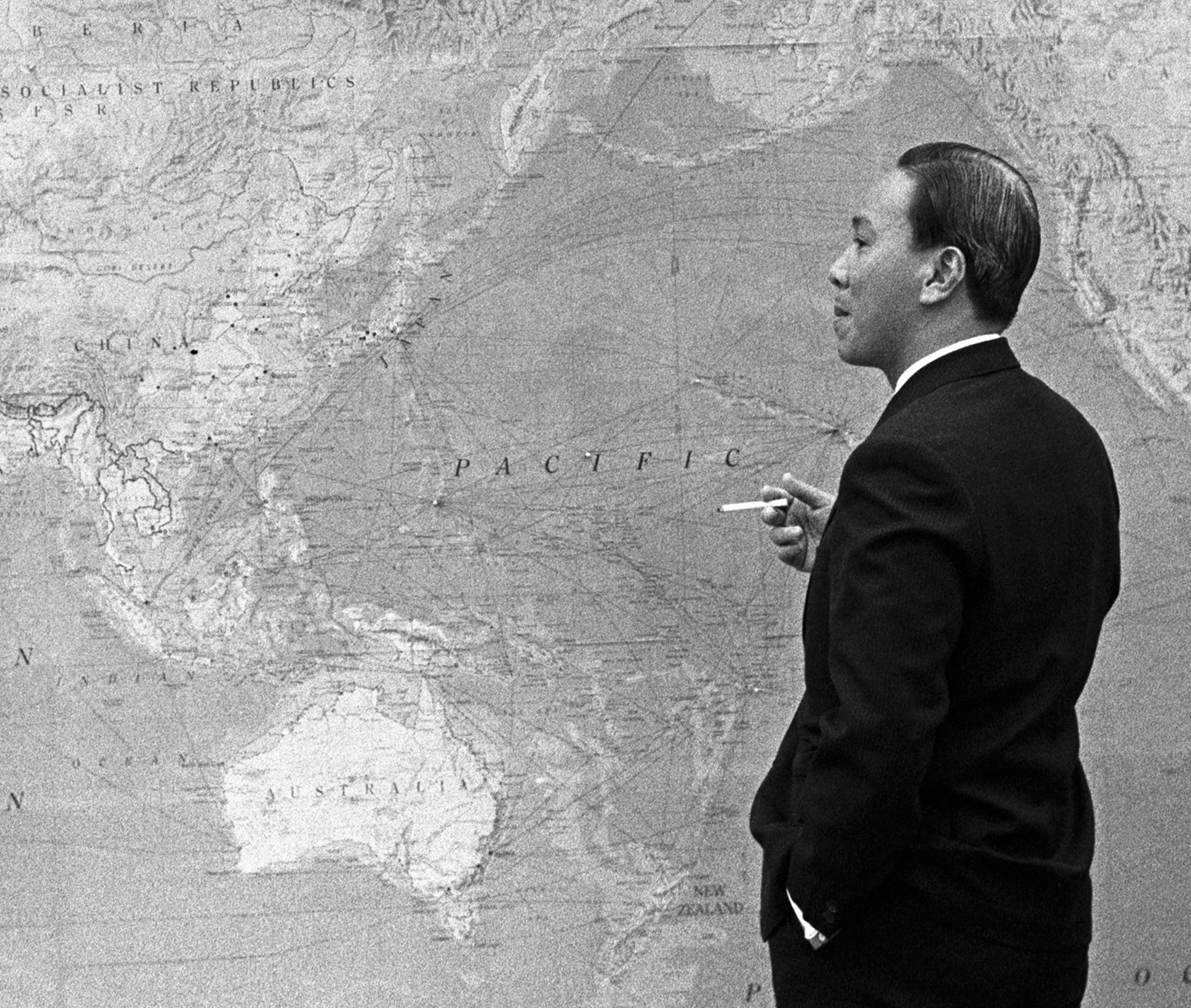
Thiệu (pictured) and Minh blamed one another for the assassinations.

The responsibility for the assassinations was generally put on the shoulders of Minh. Conein asserted that "I have it on very good authority of very many people, that Big Minh gave the order," as did William Colby, the director of the CIA's Far Eastern division. Đôn was equally emphatic, saying "I can state without equivocation that this was done by General Dương Văn Minh and by him alone."

Lodge thought Xuân was partly culpable, asserting that "Diệm and Nhu had been assassinated, if not by Xuân personally, at least at his direction." Minh later blamed Thiệu for the assassinations. In 1971, Minh claimed Thiệu was responsible for the deaths by hesitating and delaying the attack by the 5th Division on Gia Long Palace. Thiệu stridently denied responsibility and issued a statement that Minh did not dispute: "Dương Văn Minh has to assume entire responsibility for the death of Ngô Đình Diệm." During the presidency of Richard Nixon, a Kennedy opponent, a US government investigation was initiated into American involvement, convinced that Kennedy secretly ordered the killings, but no evidence was found.

Conein asserted that Minh's humiliation by the Ngô brothers was a major motivation for ordering their executions. He reasoned that Minh had been embarrassed by arriving at the presidential residence in full ceremonial military uniform to take power, only to find an empty building. One CIA employee said "They had to kill him [Diệm]. Otherwise his supporters would gradually rally and organise and there would be civil war." Several months after the event, Minh reportedly said privately that "We had no alternative. They had to be killed. Diệm could not be allowed to live because he was too much respected among simple, gullible people in the countryside, especially the Catholics and the refugees. We had to kill Nhu because he was so widely feared – and he had created organizations that were arms of his personal power."

Trần Văn Hương, a civilian opposition politician who was jailed in 1960 for signing the Caravelle Manifesto that criticised Diệm, said: "The top generals who decided to murder Diệm and his brother were scared to death. The generals knew very well that having no talent, no moral virtues, no political support whatsoever, they could not prevent a spectacular comeback of the president and Mr. Nhu if they were alive."

== Reaction ==
The reaction to the coup was mixed. The coup was immediately denounced by the Soviet Union and the People's Republic of China, asserting that the coup had brought a US "puppet" government. The remainder of the world expressed the general hope that the junta would end persecution of Buddhists and focus on defeating the communist insurgency.

Both North Vietnam and the VC were caught off guard by the events in Saigon. Hanoi initially did not comment apart from repeating the news, as they had not been prepared. On one hand, the communist leaders were disheartened that they could no longer exploit Diệm's unpopularity; on the other, they were confident that Diệm's successors would be weak, fall apart easily and facilitate a communist revolution. The official newspaper, the Nhan Dan, opined that "By throwing off Ngo Dinh Diem and his brother Ngo Dinh Nhu, the US imperialists have themselves destroyed the political bases they had built up for years. The deaths of Diem and Nhu were followed by the disintegration of big fragments of the ... [government] machine."

On the night of 1 November, as Gia Long Palace was besieged, VC radio in South Vietnam had urged the Vietnamese people and ARVN loyalists to resist the coup. However, the generals' quick and successful coup prevented any joint action. Within a week of the coup, the VC had regained its direction and launched more than one thousand attacks. A communist spokesperson expressed shock that the Americans had appeared to support the removal of Diệm, believing him to have been one of their strongest opponents. The leader of the VC, Nguyễn Hữu Thọ, termed the coup a "gift from Heaven for us". Some VC officials were so surprised that the Americans would remove Diệm that they thought it was a trick. They felt Diệm's removal was a blunder on the part of the Americans. Tho said "Our enemy has been seriously weakened from all points of view, military, political and administrative." Thọ said:

For the same reasons, the coercive apparatus, set up over the years with great care by Diệm, is utterly shattered, specially at the base. The principle chiefs of security and the secret police, on which mainly depended the protection of the regime and the repression of the revolutionary movement, have been eliminated, purges.

Troops, officers, and officials of the army and administration are completely lost; they have no more confidence in their chiefs and have no idea to whom they should be loyal.

From the political point of view the weakening of our adversary is still clear. Reactionary political organizations like the Labor and Personalism Party, the National Revolutionary Movement, the Republican Youth, the Women's Solidarity Movement etc. ... which constituted an appreciable support for the regime have been dissolved, eliminated.

The deposition of the Ngô brothers was greeted with widespread joy by the South Vietnamese public. Large spontaneous street demonstrations took place. The offices of the Times of Vietnam, the Ngô family's propaganda mouthpiece, were burned. Elsewhere, the crowd smashed windows and ransacked any building associated with Nhu. The tension released by the downfall of the regime sparked off celebrations similar to Tết (Lunar New Year) celebrations. Americans were treated and received with great enthusiasm, Lodge was mobbed by the Saigon public, and it was joked that Lodge would win any Vietnamese election by a landslide. Lodge recommended immediate recognition of the new regime by Washington, asserting that the popular approval of the Vietnamese for the coup warranted it. Lodge reported: "Every Vietnamese has a grin on his face today". The crowds swarmed onto the grounds of Gia Long Palace in a carnival atmosphere, punctuated by celebratory ARVN gunfire, while a sea of Buddhist flags flew throughout the city. As Lodge traveled from his residence to the US embassy, the crowds cheered his convoy, and when he walked past the Xá Lợi Pagoda, the focal point of the raids by Nhu's Special Forces, he was mobbed by jubilant Buddhists who tossed him high into the air several times until he was rescued by police. The people were very happy with the soldiers, giving them fruit, flowers and garlands of roses.

Madame Nhu, who was in the United States at the time, denounced the coup and angrily accused the Americans of orchestrating it. When asked about whether the US was involved, she replied "definitely", elaborating that "no coup can erupt without American incitement and backing" and declaring that she would not seek asylum "in a country whose government stabbed me in the back". She said "I believe all the devils of hell are against us" and that "whoever has the Americans as allies does not need enemies".

The United States publicly disclaimed responsibility or involvement in the coup. Many, including Harriman, General Maxwell Taylor, and Assistant Secretary of State Roger Hilsman, denied involvement, although Hilsman admitted that American disapproval of Diem's policies would have encouraged the generals. Privately, the White House was elated by the coup, as it had been relatively bloodless. The White House fostered the impression that the coup was purely Vietnamese and claimed to have no knowledge of it. A year later, Trueheart was quoted that the United States had been aware of the generals' actions.

=== Transition of power ===
Even before the start of the coup, the generals had been in contact with civilian opposition figures and more moderate members of Diệm's regime. Once the coup was confirmed to have concluded, negotiations by the generals and dissidents began. All of Diệm's ministers were forced to resign, and no further reprisals were taken. Diệm's Vice President Nguyễn Ngọc Thơ had discussions with Minh over the interim government. The Americans also pressured the generals to give Thơ a prominent role so as to give the impression of civilian rule. They promised to resume the Commercial Import Program, their main aid initiative to South Vietnam, which had been suspended due to relations with Diệm.

The Military Revolutionary Council (MRC), as it called itself, dissolved Diệm's rubber-stamp National Assembly and the constitution of 1956. The MRC vowed support for free elections, unhindered political opposition, freedom of the press, freedom of religion, and an end to discrimination, and that the purpose of the coup was to bolster the fight against the VC. Further, it condemned the recent legislative elections as "dishonest and fraudulent", imposed martial law, announced a curfew, and ordered the release of political prisoners jailed by Diệm. The MRC also announced that a new constitution would be written. In the interim, an appointed body known as the "Council of Notables" replaced the legislature in an advisory capacity.

The generals decided on a two-tier government structure, with a military committee overseen by Minh presiding over a regular cabinet that would be predominantly civilian, with Thơ as prime minister. The new government was announced on 5 November. Minh was named president and chief of the Military Committee; Thơ was listed as prime minister, Minister of Economy, and Minister of Finance; Đôn was named Minister of Defense; and Đính was made the Minister of Security (Interior). Only one other general was in the cabinet of 15, which was dominated by bureaucrats and civilians with no previous political experience. This was followed by the release of Provisional Constitutional Act No. 1, formally suspending the 1956 constitution and detailing the structure and duty of the interim government. On 6 November, Saigon radio announced the composition of the executive committee of the MRC. Minh was chairman, Đính and Đôn were deputy chairmen, and nine other senior generals, including Kim, Thiệu, Khiêm, Trần Văn Minh and Phạm Xuân Chiểu. A notable omission was the II Corps commander, General Khánh, who was transferred to I Corps, the northernmost Corps and the farthest away from Saigon. The Americans recognized the new government on 8 November.

== See also ==
- Arrest and assassination of Ngô Đình Diệm
- Reaction to the 1963 South Vietnamese coup
