= Yuen =

Yuen is a Cantonese Chinese surname, which can refer to:

袁, 阮, 元, 源, 原 and 苑

- Yuan (surname), the Pinyin transliteration of the Han Chinese surnames 袁, 元, 源, 原 and 苑
- Ruan (surname), the Pinyin transliteration of the Han Chinese surname 阮
- Nguyen (surname), the most common Vietnamese surname, written in Chu Han as 阮
- Chinese yuan, the basic unit of currency in China

== See also ==
- Yuen gongwon (UN Park), a burial ground for United Nations Command casualties of the Korean War
- Yuen Poovarawan, Thai computer scientist (Yuen as a given name)
- Yuan (disambiguation)
