= Nguyen =

Vietnamese surname

Nguyễn
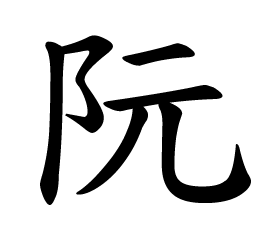
- Chữ Hán for Nguyễn
- Pronunciation: Hanoi: [ŋwiə̯n˧ˀ˥] Saigon: [ŋwiə̯ŋ˧˩˧]
- Language: Vietnamese

Other names
- Variant forms: Ruan, Yuen

Nguyễn (chữ Hán: 阮; sometimes abbreviated as Ng̃) is the most common surname among Vietnamese people. Outside of Vietnam, the surname is commonly rendered without diacritics as Nguyen. (Note: If written without diacritics, "Nguyen" may be sometimes confused with "nguyên" or "Nguyên", which are respectively a different word and another given name.) (Note: In French, "Nguyên" is an alternative spelling of Nguyen, both differing from the native Vietnamese spelling. "Nguyên" is sometimes used, since in French "ê" is graphically the closest character to "ễ".) By some estimates 30 to 39 percent of Vietnamese people bear this surname.

== Origin and usage ==
Nguyễn is the transcription of the Sino-Vietnamese pronunciation of the character 阮, which originally was used to write a name of a state in Gansu or ruan, an ancient Chinese instrument. In Vietnamese, Nguyễn is primarily used as a surname and is the most common family name in Vietnam. The same Chinese character is often romanized as Ruǎn in Mandarin and as Yuen in Cantonese.

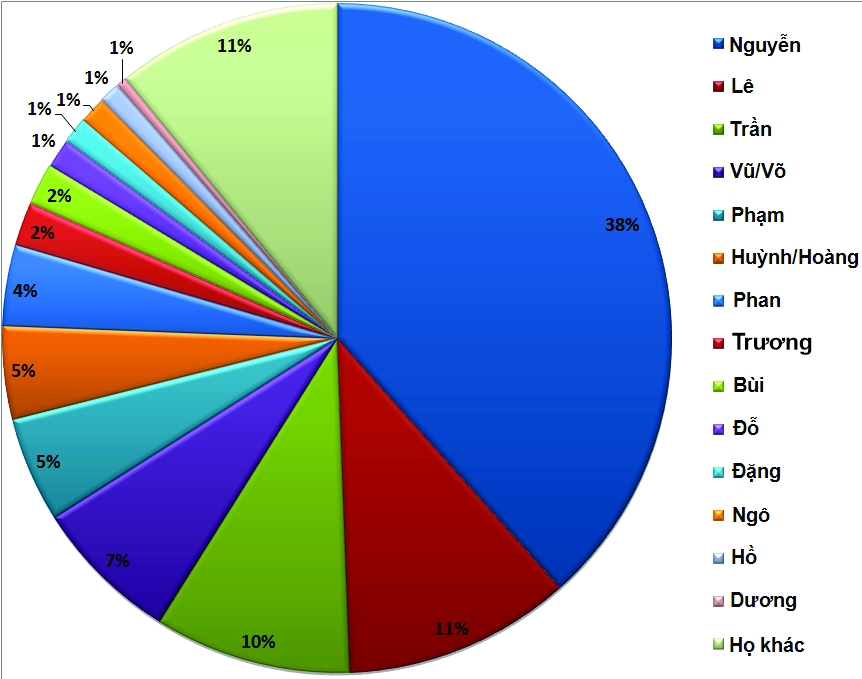
Distribution of surnames in Vietnam

The first recorded mention of a person surnamed Nguyễn is a description dating AD 317, of a journey to Jiaozhou undertaken by Eastern Jin dynasty officer Nguyễn Phu and his family. Many events in Vietnamese history have contributed to the name's prominence. In 1232, after usurping the Lý dynasty, Trần Thủ Độ forced the descendants of the Lý to change their surname to Nguyễn. When Hồ Quý Ly overturned the Trần dynasty, he killed many of their descendants so when the Hồ dynasty collapsed in 1407, many of his descendants changed their surname to Nguyễn in fear of retribution. In 1592, on the collapse of the Mạc dynasty, their descendants changed their surname to Nguyễn. In late 16th century, the Tư Mã clan from Thanh Hóa changed to Nguyễn and settled in Cochinchina. When the Nguyễn dynasty (the descendants of the Nguyễn Lords) took power in 1802, some of the descendants of the Trịnh Lords fearing retribution changed their surname to Nguyễn, while others fled north into China.

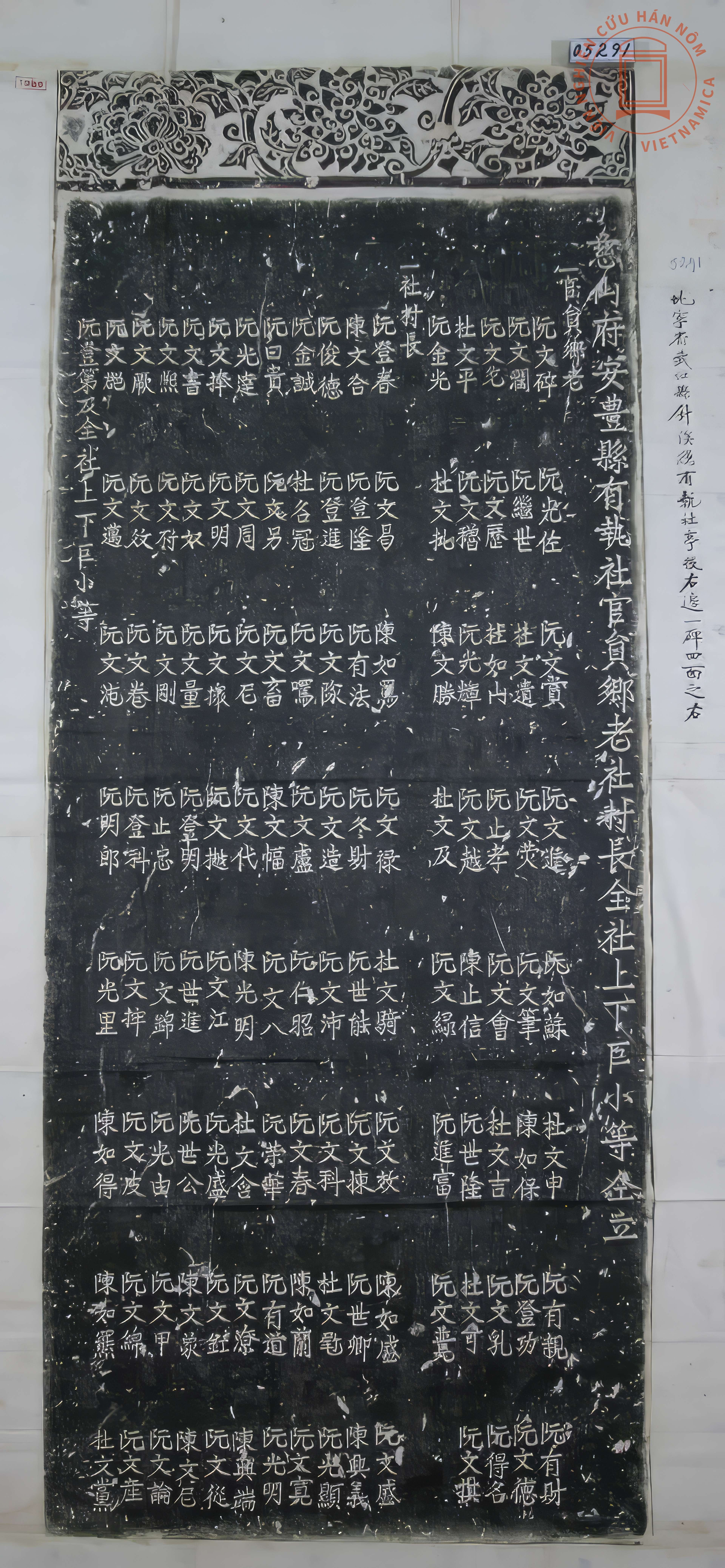
A Vietnamese stele from 1699 during the Lê dynasty, recording the names of those to inherit the duty of ancestral worship and clan rituals. A majority of the people listed have the surname 阮 Nguyễn.

== Overseas Vietnamese usage ==
The prevalence of Nguyễn as a family name in Vietnam extends to outside the country, due to numerous and widespread Vietnamese emigrants. Outside Vietnam, the surname is commonly rendered without diacritics, as Nguyen. Nguyen was the seventh most common family name in Australia in 2006 (second only to Smith in Melbourne phone books), and the 54th most common in France. It was the 41st most common surname in Norway in 2020 and tops the foreign name list in the Czech Republic. Because most Icelanders use patronymic surnames, Nguyen is the most common hereditary family name in Iceland.

In the United States, Nguyen is the 38th most-common surname and is shared by more than 437,000 individuals, according to the 2010 Census; it was the 57th and 229th most-common surname, respectively, in the 2000 and 1990 censuses. It is also the most common exclusively East Asian surname. It is ranked 124th in the U.S. Social Security Index. Nguyen was the 57th most common surname in the whole of Australia in 2022.

== Subfamilies ==
In Vietnamese tradition, people are referred to by their personal names and not by their family names even in formal situations. However, some groups distinguish themselves from other Nguyễn by passing elements of their names that are usually considered middle names to their children. This practice is more common with male than with female children. Some of the prominent subgroups within the Nguyễn family are:

- Nguyễn Phước or Nguyễn Phúc (阮福): Surname for the Nguyễn Lords family members, and all members of the Nguyễn dynasty emperors.
- Nguyễn Đình 阮廷
- Nguyễn Hữu 阮有
- Nguyễn Cảnh 阮景
- Nguyễn Khắc 阮克
- Nguyễn Tiến 阮進
- Nguyễn Đức 阮德
- Nguyễn Minh 阮明
- Nguyễn Thanh 阮清
- Nguyễn Ngọc 阮玉
- Nguyễn Văn 阮文
- Nguyễn Quang 阮光
- Nguyễn Xuân 阮春
- Nguyễn Huy 阮輝
- Nguyễn Hoàng 阮黃
- Tôn Thất 尊室 (Tôn Nữ 尊女 for females): surname for members of the Nguyễn dynasty royal family that were not direct descendants of the Emperor.

== Pronunciation ==
The Vietnamese pronunciation is [ŋwiən˦ˀ˥] in Northern dialect or [ŋwiəŋ˨˩˦] in Southern dialect, in both cases, in one syllable. [ŋ] is the velar nasal found in the middle of the English word singer. [w] is the semivowel found in the English word win. [iə] is a rising diphthong, the sound of which is similar to the diphthong /ɪə/ found in the British English Received Pronunciation of ear. Finally, [n] occurs in the English word net.

Furthermore, in Vietnamese Nguyễn is also pronounced with a tone. In Southern Vietnam, it is pronounced with the dipping tone: the pitch of the voice first drops from a mid-level to the bottom of the speaker's range of pitch and then rises back to mid. In Northern Vietnam, it is pronounced with the creaky rising tone: the pitch of the voice rises from mid-level to the top of the speaker's range of pitch, but with constricted vocal cords, akin to a glottal stop in the middle of the vowel.

Common pronunciations by English speakers include /wɪn/ win, /nuːˈjɛn/ noo-YEN and /ˈnjuːən/ NEW-ən.

== Changes of family name ==
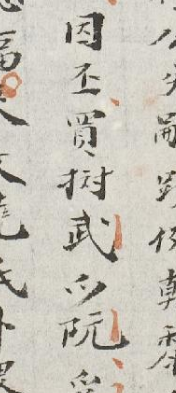
A genealogy book of the Nguyễn Tựu family records that their surname was originally Vũ (武) but was later changed to Nguyễn (阮) due to Lê dynasty regulations. [Because of that, they changed the surname Vũ to Nguyễn. (因丕買𢬭武𫜵阮; Nhân vậy mới đổi Vũ làm Nguyễn)]

There have been various points in Vietnam's history at which people have changed their family name to Nguyễn. When the Lý dynasty fell in 1232, Trần Thủ Độ, who orchestrated its overthrow, forced descendants of the Lý dynasty to adopt the name due to the naming taboo surrounding Trần Lý, grandfather to emperor Trần Cảnh.

夏六月，頒國諱、廟諱。元祖諱李，因改李朝為阮朝，且絶民之望李氏也。

Hạ lục nguyệt, ban quốc huý, miếu huý. Nguyên Tổ huý Lý, nhân cải Lý triều vi Nguyễn triều, thả tuyệt dân chi vọng Lý thị dã.

In the sixth month of summer, the state taboo names and temple taboo names were put into effect. Since the personal name of the founding ancestor [Trần Lý] was Lý (李), the Lý dynasty (李朝) was therefore renamed the Nguyễn dynasty (阮朝). This was also done to put an end to the people's hopes for the restoration of the Lý clan.

— Đại Việt sử ký toàn thư 大越史記全書, volume 5 卷之五

From 457 to Hồ Quý Ly (1401), in Hải Dương and a part of Haiphong today there is the district of the Phí family (Vietnamese: huyện Phí Gia). At the end of the Lý and the Trần dynasty there were many people who changed their names to Nguyễn and Nguyễn Phí. By the Lê dynasty, the court changed the name of the district to Kim Thành.

When the Mạc dynasty fell in 1592, their descendants changed their family name to Nguyễn.

Trần Quang Diệu (like his wife Bùi Thị Xuân) worked as a major officer for the Tây Sơn dynasty, against Nguyễn Ánh. After the Tây Sơn dynasty was defeated, his children adopted various names or changed names (one of them into Nguyễn) in order to flee retaliation.

Contrary to the common assumption that Vietnamese rulers have allowed courtiers to adopt their family name as a sign of loyalty, it was in fact a serious taboo to assume the imperial surname without legitimate lineage. Individuals who improperly adopted the imperial surname could face severe penalties, including forced name changes, removal from public office, exile, or even capital punishment. This policy was rooted in the naming taboo tradition, and was explicitly reaffirmed through imperial edicts. This prevalent notion is often used to explain the high prevalence of the surname Nguyễn in modern Vietnam, attributing it to the influence of the Nguyễn dynasty (1802–1945) as the country's last dynasty. However, the surname of the ruling dynasty was Nguyễn Phúc (阮褔), not only Nguyễn (阮).

In 1841, Nguyễn Văn Tường (阮文祥), originally named Nguyễn Phúc Tường (阮褔祥), participated in the civil examination. Emperor Thiệu Trị (紹治) ordered his name be removed from the list of graduates, changed it to Nguyễn Văn Tường, and handed him over to the Censorate for punishment. As a result, Tường was sentenced to one year in exile. Additionally, the education officials at the provincial, prefectural, and district levels, as well as officials of the Imperial Academy, examination officials, the Ministry of Rites, and the Censorate were all demoted and punished accordingly.

Here is an excerpt from Veritable Records of the Great South (chữ Hán: 大南寔錄; Đại Nam thực lục):

承天場秀才冊有阮福祥者，帝惡其冒用國姓，命革去秀才名籍，改爲阮文祥，交都察院治罪。…省、府、縣學臣，監臣、場官、禮部，竝都察院，各分別降罰。

Thừa Thiên trường tú tài sách hữu Nguyễn Phúc Tường giả, đế ố kỳ mạo dụng quốc tính, mệnh cách khứ tú tài danh tịch, cải vi Nguyễn Văn Tường, Giao Đô Sát viện trị tội... Tỉnh, phủ, huyện học thần, giám thần, trường quan, Lễ bộ, tịnh Đô Sát viện, các phân biệt giáng phạt.

In the Thừa Thiên examination licentiate register, there was a person named Nguyễn Phúc Tường (阮福祥). The emperor detested his illegal usage of the dynastic surname (阮福), and ordered that his licentiate registration be stripped, his name changed to Nguyễn Văn Tường (阮文祥), and that he be handed over to the Censorate for punishment... The provincial, prefectural, and county education officials, the academy officials, examination officers, the Ministry of Rites, and the Censorate, each received punishments of differing degrees.

— Đại Nam thực lục 大南寔錄, volume 22 卷之二十二 (Third Chronicle)

== Notable people ==
People with the name include:

- Heads of state (Nguyễn Minh Triết, Nguyễn Phú Trọng, Nguyễn Xuân Phúc, Nguyễn Xí, Nguyễn lords, Tây Sơn dynasty, Nguyễn dynasty, Nguyễn Văn Thiệu, Nguyễn Văn Xuân, Nguyễn Ngọc Thơ, Nguyễn Cao Kỳ...)
- Poets (Nguyễn Trãi, Nguyễn Du, Nguyễn Đình Chiểu, Nguyễn Khoa Điềm, Nguyen Do...)
- Catholic clergymen (Nguyễn Văn Thuận)
- Writers (Viet Thanh Nguyen)
- Scientists (Nam-Trung Nguyen)
- Composers, actors (Dustin Nguyen)
- Models (Nguyễn Thúc Thùy Tiên)
- Professional poker players (Scotty Nguyen)
- Professional American football player (Dat Nguyen)
- Professional footballer (Lee Nguyen)
- Professional Badminton World Federation player Nguyễn Tiến Minh

Hồ Chí Minh was born Nguyễn Sinh Cung and used various names with the surname Nguyễn throughout his career (Nguyễn Tất Thành, Nguyễn Ái Quốc). He was not known as Hồ Chí Minh until late in his life.
