= Yong Poovorawan =

Thai pediatrician and virologist (born 1950)

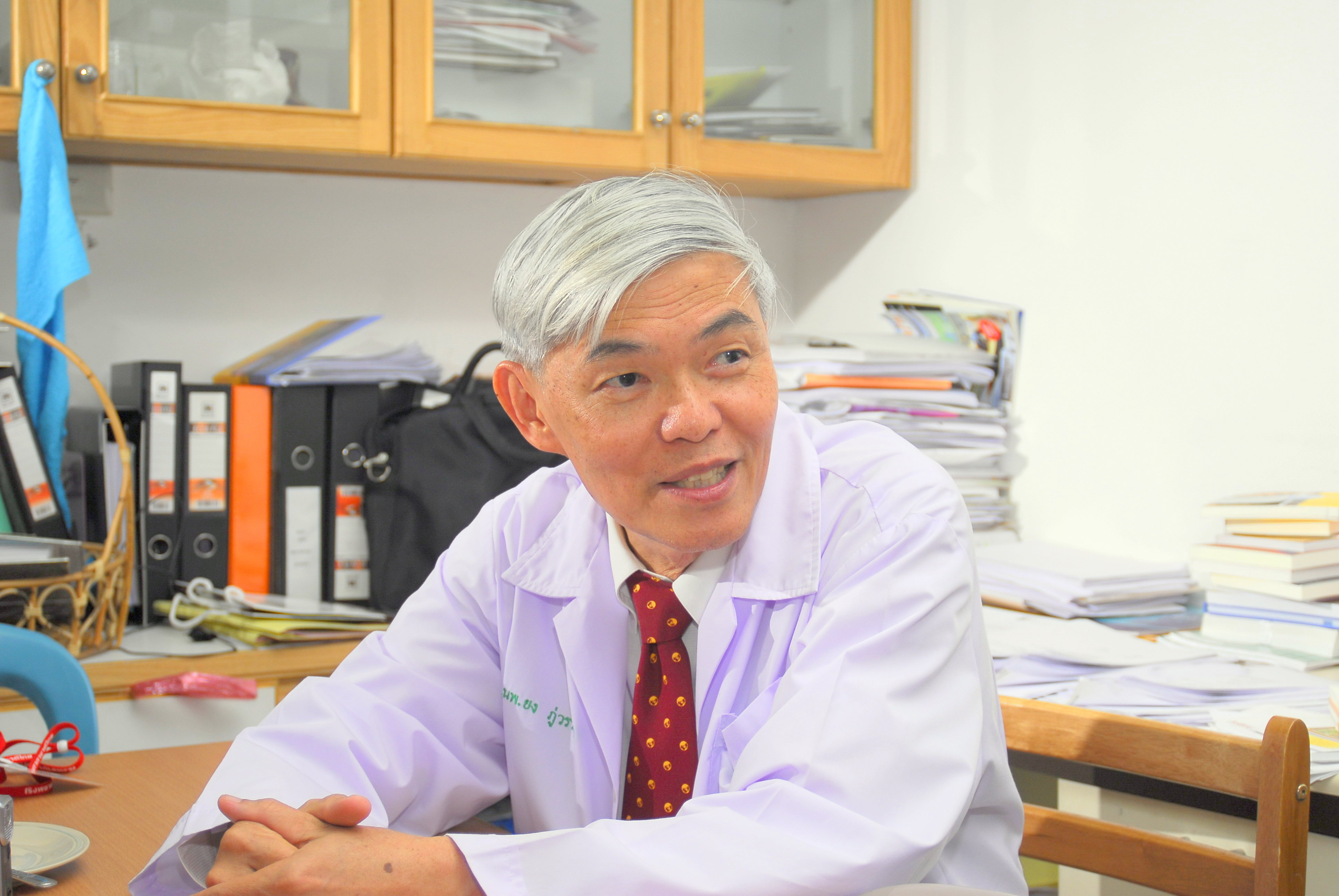
- Yong Poovorawan in 2007
- Born: 5 November 1950 (age 75); Bangkok, Thailand
- Education: Chulalongkorn University
- Known for: Viral hepatitis; H5N1 virology; Health advisor during COVID-19 pandemic in Thailand
- Relatives: Yuen Poovarawan (brother)
- Awards: Mahidol University–B.Braun Prize (2003); Outstanding Researcher Award (1997)
- Scientific career
- Fields: Pediatric hepatology; Virology
- Workplaces: Faculty of Medicine, Chulalongkorn University

Yong Poovorawan (Thai: ยง ภู่วรวรรณ, RTGS: Yong Phuworawan; born 5 November 1950) is a professor of pediatrics at the Faculty of Medicine of Chulalongkorn University in Bangkok, Thailand. He is known for research in the fields of pediatric hepatology, viral hepatitis and virology, and avian influenza.

== Early life and education ==
Yong Poovarawan was born on 5 November 1950 in Bangkok, Thailand. The fourth of six children, he is the younger twin brother of Yuen Poovarawan, computer scientist and Vice President of Kasetsart University. As a child, his family moved to Nakhon Pathom, where he attended Phrapathom Witthayalai School. He attended upper-secondary school at Triam Udom Suksa School, and graduated Bachelor of Science in 1972 and Doctor of Medicine in 1974 from Chulalongkorn University.

== Work ==
Yong trained in pediatrics at the Chulalongkorn University Faculty of Medicine and completed board certification by the Medical Council of Thailand in 1978. He was subsequently accepted as a faculty member, and received a research fellowship grant at the hepatology department at King's College Hospital Medical School during 1983–84.

He has since worked continuously at Chulalongkorn, mostly focusing on teaching and research, and obtained professorship in 1990. He has served as the head of the faculty's Viral Hepatitis Research Unit and Molecular Biology Research Unit since 1992 and 1996, respectively.

=== Research ===
Yong has held a deep interest in research since medical school. He first published in national journals during his first year of residency, and began publishing internationally in 1989, with his work on hepatitis B vaccination. He is the author or co-author of over 400 publications in the fields of gastroenterology, hepatology, and virology indexed by the PubMed database, with about 20,000 citations and an h-index of 65 as calculated by Google Scholar.

His works originally focused on the fields of pediatric hepatology and viral hepatitis, especially in applications to the Thai healthcare system, on which such works have had significant impact. Later on they expanded to include virology studies in general. Yong is widely recognized for his work on genetic sequencing and detection of the H5N1 avian influenza virus in Thailand, which saw outbreaks beginning in 2004, and is regarded as the national expert on the subject.

=== COVID-19 ===
During the COVID-19 pandemic in Thailand, Poovorawan served as an advisor to Prayut Chan-o-cha's government. He often exaggerated the efficacy of the disputed CoronaVac, which the country heavily relied on for immunization, including suggestion that a third dose of CoronaVac may result in an immunity more or less comparable to that of Pfizer-BioNTech's vaccine, or arguing for the mixing Sinovac's and AstraZeneca's vaccines based on a very small human trial.

In July 2021, his article in Thai Wikipedia was vandalized, which includes text accusing him of being "Sinovac's salesman". A complaint was filed by Poovorawan's attorney, which led to an arrest of the wrongdoer within 3 days.

== Awards and recognition ==
Yong has received numerous awards for his contributions to his fields of research, including the following:

- Outstanding Scientist Award (1997), Foundation for the Promotion of Science and Technology
- Outstanding Researcher Award (1997), National Research Council
- Senior Research Scholar (1997–present), Thailand Research Fund
- Mahidol University–B.Braun Prize for Medicine and Public Health (2003)
- Research Citation Award (2003), Thailand Research Fund
- Outstanding Lecturer Award in Health Sciences (2004), Council of the University Faculty Senates of Thailand
- Dushdi Mala Medal for medicine (2007)
- Outstanding Prof. Thailand Research Fund (2012-2014)
- Research Chair Grant, NSTDA (2014)
- Outstanding Achievement Doctor from the Medical Council of Thailand (2018)
- Achievement award in Virology, Genetics Society of Thailand] (2018)
- Achievement award from the National Vaccine Institute of Thailand (2019)

His work on avian influenza in Thailand also received outstanding research awards from the Thailand Research Fund in 2004 and the National Research Council in 2006.

Yong serves on the editorial board of Pathogens and Global Health, and once served on the board of the Journal of Pediatrics, in addition to other national publications.
