= Ruan (surname) =

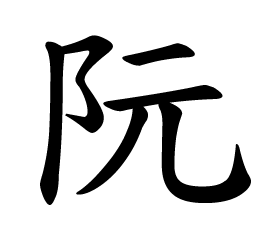
- Ruan surname in regular script
- Pronunciation: Ruǎn (Pinyin); Oán or Ńg (Pe̍h-ōe-jī)
- Language: Chinese, Vietnamese

Origin
- Language: Old Chinese

Other names
- Variant forms: Ruan, Juan (Mandarin); Un, Yuen (Cantonese); Wan, Wee, Ng, Guan (Hokkien); Nguang (Teochew); Nguang (Hokchew) 완/롼, 원 (Korean) げん, グエン (Japanese); Nguyễn (Vietnamese)
- Derivative: Nguyễn

Ruan (Chinese: 阮; pinyin: Ruǎn; Wade–Giles: Juan, [ʐwàn]) is a Chinese surname.

The Taiwanese Hokkien version [uân] or [ŋ̩̂] is transcribed Oán and Ńg in Pe̍h-ōe-jī. The Cantonese version [jy̌n] is romanized Jyun2 in the Jyutping system or Yún in the Yale system, or more commonly Yuen or Un (the latter is typical in Macau). In Hokchew Chinese, it is Nguang.

Its Vietnamese equivalent is Nguyễn (pronounced [ŋwiən˦ˀ˥] in Northern Vietnamese and [ŋwiəŋ˨˩˦] in Southern Vietnamese), and is the most common Vietnamese family name.

== Notable people named Ruan ==
- Ruan Chengfa, a Chinese politician, former Party secretary and governor of Yunnan province and Party secretary of Wuhan.
- Ruan Yu, a literature writer during Han Dynasty (Chinese: 阮瑀; ?-212)
- Ruan Xiaoxu, a bibliography writer during North Southern and Northern Dynasties (Chinese: 阮孝緒; 479－536)
- Ruan Ji, is one of the Seven Sages of the Bamboo Grove (Chinese: 阮籍;210-263)
- Ruan Xian, a Chinese scholar who lived during the Six Dynasties period (Chinese: 阮咸;3rd century)
- Ruan Yuan, a scholar-official of renown in mid-Qing China prior to the Opium War (Chinese: 阮元, 1764–1849)
- Ruan Lingyu, 20th-century Chinese actress (阮玲玉, 1910–1935)
- Ruan Lufei, Chinese chess player (阮露斐, b. 1987)
- Ruan Xiaoqi, character in the novel Water Margin (阮小七)
- Ethan Juan, a Taiwanese actor
- Wan Soon Bee, Singapore politician and businessman.
- Francis Yuen, Singaporean politician
- Kitty Yuen, Hong Kong entertainer
- Louis Yuen Siu-cheung, Hong Kong actor
- John Ruan, an American businessman and founder of Ruan Transportation
- Yongbin Ruan (born 1953), Chinese mathematician
- Xinbo Ruan, Chinese engineer
- Ruan Mei, fictional character in the video game Honkai: Star Rail

== See also ==
- Nguyễn
- Ng (surname)
