= Nguyễn Tiến Hưng =

Vietnamese politician (born 1935)

- Born: November 1, 1935 (age 91); Thanh Hóa, Vietnam
- Occupations: Economist; Academic; Civil servant

Nguyễn Tiến Hưng (also known as Gregory Tien Hung Nguyen) (born November 1, 1935) was Minister of Economic Development and Planning in the Republic of Vietnam and one of President Nguyễn Văn Thiệu's closest advisers. As of 2010, he is Professor Emeritus of Economics at Howard University in Washington, D.C.

He was born in Thanh Hóa, Vietnam, in 1935. He received his bachelor's degree in mathematics and law from University of Saigon, his master's degree (1960) and PhD (1965) in economics from the University of Virginia. He worked briefly for the Commonwealth of Virginia before becoming assistant professor of economics at North Carolina Wesleyan College in 1963 and then assistant professor of economics at Howard University in 1965. He worked as an economist in Africa with the International Monetary Fund from 1966 to 1969, before being appointed "special assistant" to President Thiệu and Commissioner of Planning in 1973. He was named Minister of Economic Development and Planning on November 28, 1974. In an attempt to force President Richard Nixon to honor what he and President Thiệu interpreted as promises of heavy American military aid should the war go badly, Hưng made public a series of letters which Nixon had sent to Thiệu in 1972 and 1973.

Hưng fled South Vietnam after the fall of Saigon, and returned to the United States. In 1977, he published a book about the economic development of Vietnam. With Jerrold L. Schecter, former White House correspondent and diplomatic editor of Time magazine, Nguyễn wrote The Palace File in 1986, which published the Nixon-Thiệu letters and provided additional insight on America's relationship with South Vietnam from his perspective. One reviewer said the book "provides significant new data on United States relations with South Vietnam from 1968 to 1975 and fresh insights into the character of Nguyen Van Thieu, the general whom the United States supported as South Vietnam's President from 1967 to 1975." In 1991, he advocated unfreezing the American-held assets of the South Vietnamese government and using them as leverage in improving human rights in Vietnam. In the early years of the 2000s (decade), Hưng was a senior advisor for the World Bank's Rural Finance Project in Vietnam, where he worked on the design and implementation of the Mobile Banking Program. In 2005, he published (in Vietnamese) the book Khi Đồng Minh Tháo Chạy ("When Your Ally Cuts and Runs"). He released his most recent book, Tâm Tư Tổng Thống Thiệu ("In the Mind of President Thieu"), in May 2010.
