= Yuen Poovarawan =

Thai computer scientist (born 1950)

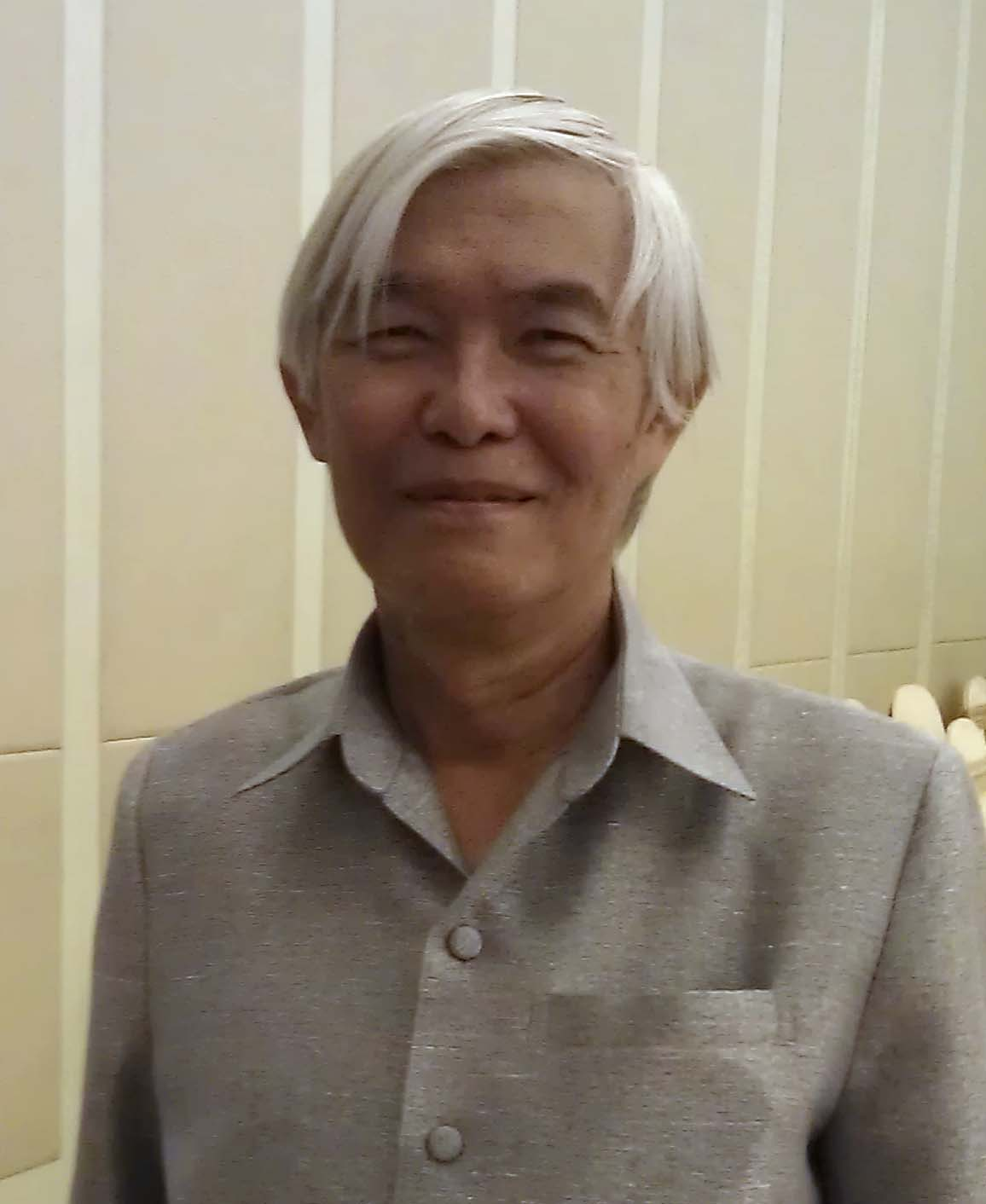
- Yuen in 2011
- Born: 5 November 1950 (age 75); Bangkok, Thailand
- Education: Chulalongkorn University; Asian Institute of Technology
- Known for: Development of Thai natural language processing
- Relatives: Yong Poovorawan (brother)
- Awards: Outstanding Researcher Award (1996)
- Scientific career
- Fields: Computer science
- Workplaces: Kasetsart University

Yuen Poovarawan (Thai: ยืน ภู่วรวรรณ, RTGS: Yuen Phuworawan; born 5 November 1950) is a Thai computer scientist. He worked at Kasetsart University in Bangkok, Thailand until his retirement, where his last positions were associate professor in the Department of Computer Engineering and Vice President for Information Technology. Among his noted contributions are the development of natural language processing for the Thai language, and the advancement of information technology services in Thailand, particularly the implementation of networking infrastructure at Kasetsart.

== Early life and education ==
Yuen Poovarawan was born on 5 November 1950 in Bangkok, Thailand. The third out of six children, he is the elder twin brother of Yong Poovorawan, medical professor at the Faculty of Medicine, Chulalongkorn University. As a child, his family moved to Nakhon Pathom, where he attended Phrapathom Witthayalai School. He graduated Bachelor of Engineering in electrical engineering from Chulalongkorn University in 1972, and completed two engineering master's degrees, also in electrical engineering at Chulalongkorn University, and in industrial engineering at the Asian Institute of Technology, in 1974.

== Work ==
Yuen began his career in 1973 as an instructor in the Department of Electrical Engineering at Kasetsart University, where he has since continued working. He began working on software development for microcomputers in 1978, and worked on natural language processing algorithms from 1980. He and his team demonstrated the first interactive text editor for the Thai language in 1981, and released Thai Easy Writer, the first Thai word processing application, the following year.

Yuen was among the proponents for the creation of a standard Thai language system for computers (over twenty had become available by 1984), and vice-chaired the committee for the development of the TIS 620-2529 character set and its subsequent version, TIS 620-2533.

The Microcomputer Research Laboratory, which Yuen was head of, also developed the Thai Kernel System, a hardware-independent system designed to promote system-intercompatibility for Thai-language application development, in 1990, but this failed to gain a user base as it lost ground to the expanding Microsoft Windows systems.

In his research, Yuen pioneered the utilization of dictionary databases for Thai word splitting and machine translation, created the first Thai language thesaurus and developed word and sentence reconstruction methods for use in spell checking applications, among other things. Much of his work was presented at various national and international conferences.

He also played a pivotal role in the development of Kasetsart University's computer network infrastructure, beginning in 1990 and leading to the implementation of Thailand's first fiber-optic university network, and by 2003, wireless LAN coverage throughout the university's campus, the largest such network in Southeast Asia. Kasetsart has long been an early adopter of information technology services; its Computer Center, for which Yuen previously served as director, has enjoyed faculty-level status since 1985. He currently serves as the university's vice president for information technology.

Yuen is author of over sixty computer-related textbooks, as well as other academic titles, and has long been regarded as one of the leading computer science experts in Thailand.

== Personal life ==
Yuen is married to Wanna Poovarawan, with two daughters and one son, Nawan, Nanjana and Nutch Poovarawan, respectively. An early adopter of the technology, Yuen began communicating with his children via email in 1994, reaching out when they were abroad and teaching life lessons through analogies often taken from nature. For this, Google named him one of its "web heroes" for its "the web is what you make of it" campaign promoting the Google Chrome browser.

== Awards and recognition ==
As recognition of his continued work in natural language processing and applied uses of the computer, the National Research Council of Thailand granted Yuen the Outstanding Researcher Award in physical sciences and mathematics in 1996. He had also received the National Research Council Award for innovation in 1983, 1984, 1986, 1987, 1988, 1990 and 1992.

He holds positions on the boards of the Computer Association of Thailand and the National Electronics and Computer Technology Center, and is a member of the National Research Council. He also provides honorary consultative services to other organizations, including the Bureau of the Budget and the Revenue Department. He works with the Institute for the Promotion of Teaching Science and Technology in curricula development for computer teaching, and is Thailand's coordinator for the International Olympiad in Informatics.
