= Thai Wikipedia =

Thai-language edition of Wikipedia

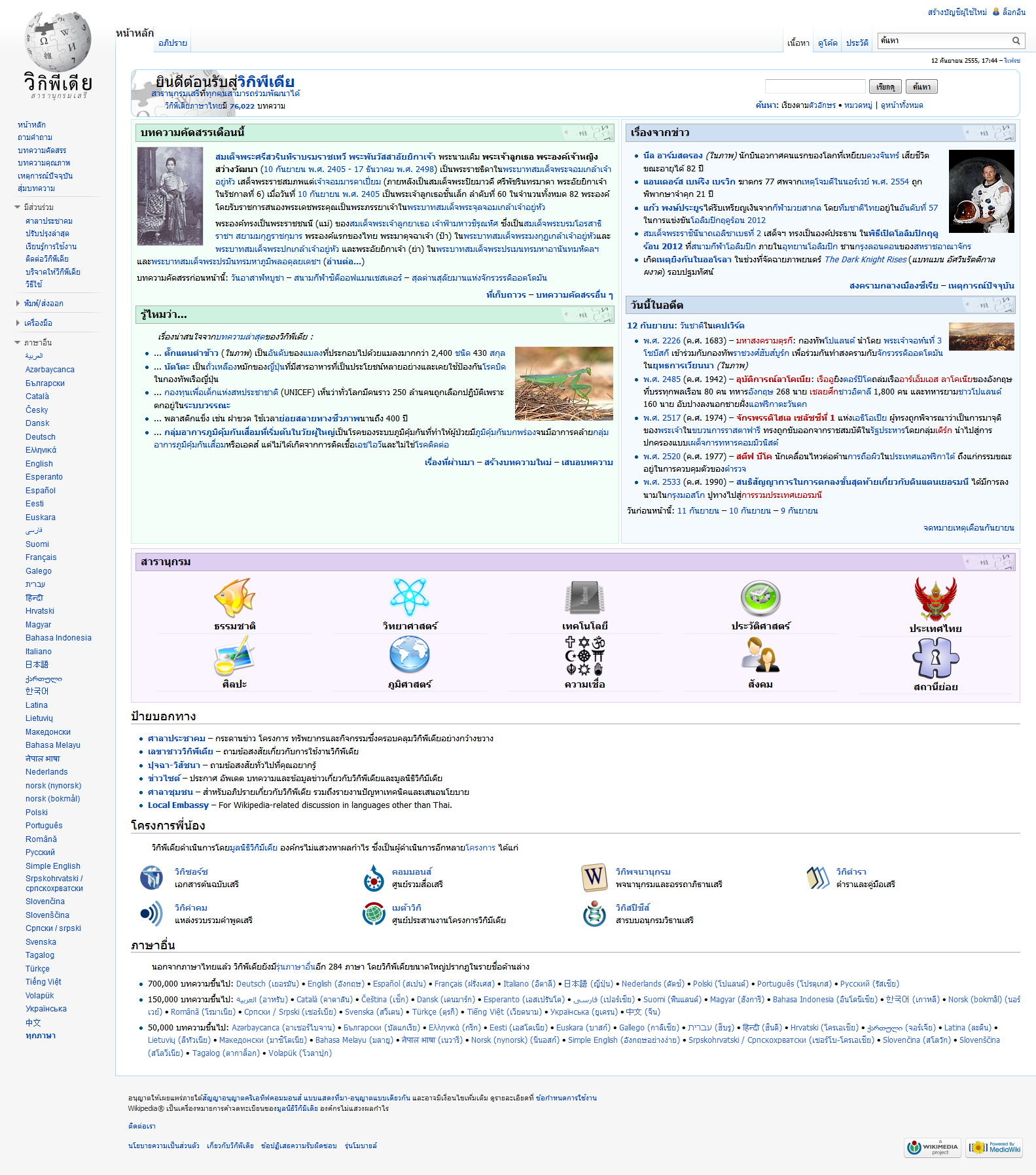
- Website type: Internet encyclopedia project
- Available in: Thai, Southern Thai
- Headquarters: Miami, Florida
- Owner: Wikimedia Foundation
- Creator: Thai wiki community
- Website: th.wikipedia.org
- Commercial: No
- Registration: Optional
- Content license: Creative Commons Attribution/ Share-Alike 4.0 (most text also dual-licensed under GFDL); Media licensing varies

The Thai Wikipedia (Thai: วิกิพีเดียภาษาไทย; RTGS: Wikiphidia Phasa Thai) is the Thai language edition of Wikipedia. It was started on 25 December 2003. As of October 2026, it has 188,567 articles and 570,097 registered users. As of March 2022, Wikipedia (all languages combined) was ranked 14th in Alexa's Top Sites Thailand.

As of January 2021, the Thai Wikipedia is the most visited Wikipedia in both Thailand and Laos. In Laos the position of the most popular language version of Wikipedia alternates between English and Thai.

On 31 January 2006, the Thai Wikipedia was first recognized along with English Wikipedia in the Thai press. In 2007, a thesis, Thai Wikipedia and Communicating Knowledge to the Public, was published by a graduate student from the Faculty of Fine and Applied Arts, Chulalongkorn University.

The Thai Wikipedia was mentioned during a public forum during the 2005-2006 Thai political crisis when a speaker suggested that Thai people should read Wikipedia's article on Thaksin Shinawatra, the former prime minister.

The Thai Wikipedia is the second online encyclopedia in the Thai language after the Thai Junior Encyclopedia Project, which was developed under the patronage of King Bhumibol Adulyadej.

== News ==
=== Activities ===
On January 7, 2011, it was reported that Juti Krairiksh, the Minister of Information and Communication Technology (ICT), instructed CAT Telecom to allocate 10.7 million THB to hire a translation service for 3 million English Wikipedia articles into Thai. This project utilized Statistical Machine Translation technology, with the translated content hosted on www.asiaonline.com. However, by 2012, the website www.asiaonline.com had ceased operations for unknown reasons, and the exact date it stopped providing services remains unclear.

On October 11, 2012, dtac launched the Wikipedia Zero service, allowing access to Wikipedia without data charges. The service was first introduced at the Professional Development for Teachers exhibition (Educa 2012).

On April 27, 2014, dtac launched the "Expanding Knowledge for Thai Society with Wikipedia" campaign, encouraging its employees to translate English Wikipedia articles into Thai. The project aimed to create 5,000 Thai articles with over 10,000 combined volunteer hours. Taweetham Limpanuparb, a coordinator for Wikipedia volunteers in Thailand, noted that the Thai Wikipedia had significantly fewer articles compared to other languages, and many existing entries were brief or incomplete. He also highlighted the low number of volunteers relative to the internet-using population, stating that an increase in contributors would help bring the quality of Thai Wikipedia content to the level of developed nations.

On the afternoon of September 19, 2014, reports emerged that users attempting to access the Thai Wikipedia URL were met with a message from the Ministry of Information and Communication Technology stating that the site contained "inappropriate content." Internet service providers unable to reach the site included 3BB and True, though access remained possible via HTTPS and mobile versions.

In 2019, the National Electronics and Computer Technology Center (NECTEC) organized a competition titled "Question Answering Program from Thai Wikipedia."

=== Content ===
In 2009, the Manager Daily newspaper reported that the article on Thailand incorrectly listed the system of government as a Constitutional monarchy.

In December 2013, media outlets reported that the Department of Special Investigation (DSI) article had been vandalized. The edits falsely claimed that Tarit Pengdith had passed away and altered his name to "Tarit-seeduang" (a pun on hemorrhoids), while listing "blowing a whistle" as his accomplishment. Tarit stated he would not pursue legal action regarding the incident.

In August 2014, news reports stated that General Prayut Chan-o-cha had been identified as the Prime Minister on his Wikipedia page before the National Legislative Assembly had officially voted to select him.

In 2020, inquiries were made regarding an IP address that edited the Kaewsan Atibodhi article, with demands for accountability from the responsible party. Phaisan Phuechmongkhon posted that ill-intentioned individuals had edited the Triam Udom Suksa School article to incorrectly list Field Marshal Plaek Phibunsongkhram as the founder while removing the name of Mom Luang Pin Malakul.

In 2021, the Cyber Crime Investigation Bureau (CCIB) investigated and arrested an individual who had edited the article for Yong Poovorawan. The edit falsely added that he was a "salesperson for Sinovac for General Prayut Chan-o-cha's government," following reports that the publication of this false information had caused damage.

== Timeline ==
Thai Wikipedia
Articles	188567
Files	9508
Edits	13308156
Users	570097
Active users	2561
Admins	18

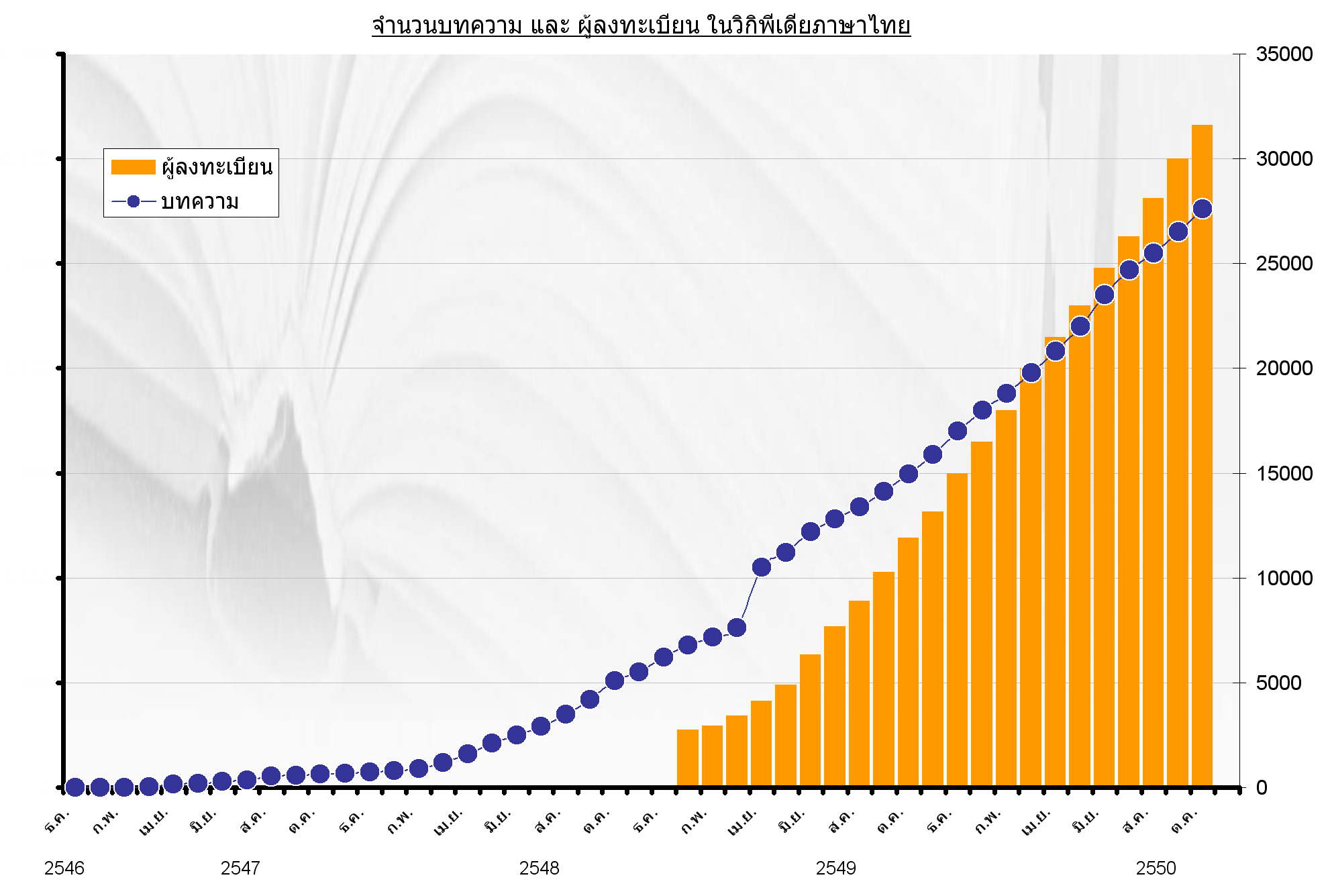
Thai Wikipedia statistics as of 4 October 2007. It shows about 28,000 articles (shown in dots) and 32,000 users (orange bars).

- 25 December 2003: The Thai main page created after first created on 16 March 2003 with the word "Describe the new page here."
- 27 December 2003: The first article created containing only one word "ดาราศาสตร์" (astronomy) and 32 interwiki links. After that it became a stub on 31 May 2004.
- 28 February 2004: The real first article, วิทยาการคอมพิวเตอร์ (computer science), was created.
- 21 April 2004: 100th article, ห้องอนาคต (Time & Time Travel, a fiction)
- 17 August 2004: 500th article, สนเกรวิลเลีย (Grevillea)
- 10 March 2005: 1,000th article, แฮร์รี่ พอตเตอร์ (Harry Potter)
- 1 May 2005: The first featured article, แฟร็กทัล (fractal)
- September 2005: More than 30 university students registered and wrote articles as their homework.
- 28 October 2005: 5,000th article, เปาบุ้นจิ้น (Bao Zheng)
- 31 January 2006: Press coverage in onopen.com
- March 2006: Mass content addition of articles about years from 543 BC (Buddhist Era 1) to about 1800 semi-manually by using JavaScript. About 2,500 stubs are added.
- 14 March 2006: 10,000th article, มหาวิทยาลัยเพนซิลเวเนียสเตต (Pennsylvania State University)
- 16 March 2007: 20,000th article, อาริเอส มู (Aries Mu)
- 10 December 2007: 30,000th article, หลิว เต๋อหัว (Andy Lau)
- 26 October 2008: 40,000th article, ฤทธิ์ดาบไม้ไผ่ (Bamboo Blade)
- 4 September 2009: 50,000th article, พระนันทะ (Nanda, half brother of Buddha)
- 30 January 2016: 100,000th article, คริสต์ทศวรรษ 1940 (1940s)
