= Nguyễn Văn Thiệu =

President of South Vietnam from 1967 to 1975

Lieutenant General Nguyễn Văn Thiệu
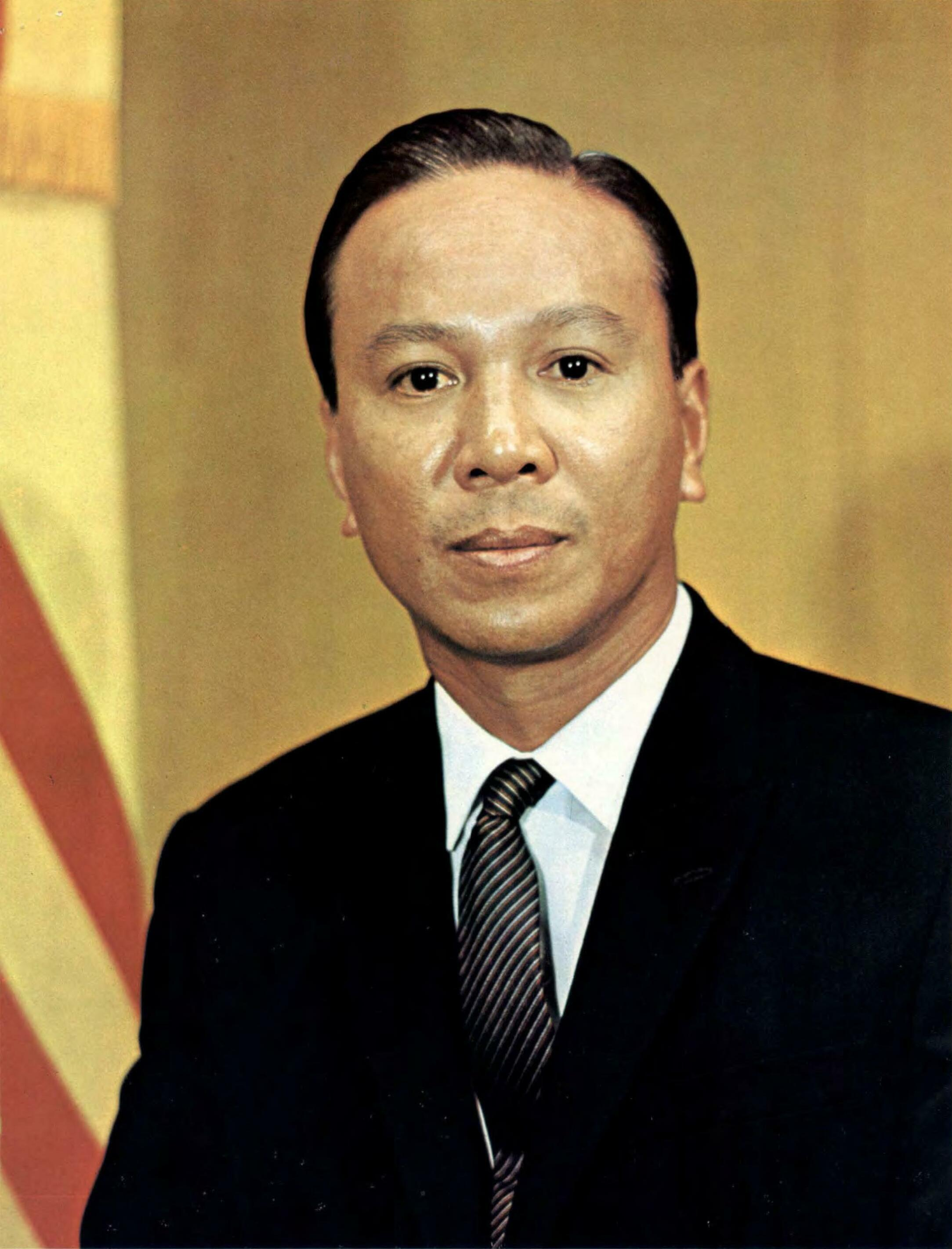
- Official portrait, 1969

2nd President of South Vietnam
- In office 31 October 1967 – 21 April 1975
- Prime Minister: See list: Nguyễn Văn Lộc (1967–1968); Trần Văn Hương (1968–1969); Trần Thiện Khiêm (1969–Apr. 1975); Nguyễn Bá Cẩn (Apr. 1975)
- Vice President: Nguyễn Cao Kỳ (1967–1971); Trần Văn Hương (1971–1975)
- Preceded by: Ngô Đình Diệm (as President) Himself (as Chairman of the National Leadership Committee)
- Succeeded by: Trần Văn Hương

Chairman of the National Leadership Committee
- In office 19 June 1965 – 31 October 1967
- Prime Minister: Nguyễn Cao Kỳ
- Preceded by: Phan Khắc Sửu (as Chief of State)
- Succeeded by: Position abolished

Minister of National Defense
- In office 16 February 1965 – 20 June 1965
- Prime Minister: Phan Huy Quát
- Preceded by: Trần Văn Minh
- Succeeded by: Nguyễn Hữu Có

Deputy Prime Minister of South Vietnam
- In office 18 January 1965 – 12 June 1965 Serving with: Nguyễn Lưu Viên; Nguyễn Xuân Oánh; Trần Văn Đỗ; Trần Văn Tuyên
- Prime Minister: Trần Văn Hương; Nguyễn Xuân Oánh (acting); Phan Huy Quát
- Preceded by: Đỗ Mậu; Nguyễn Tôn Hoàn
- Succeeded by: Nguyễn Hữu Có; Nguyễn Lưu Viên

Personal details
- Born: 5 April 1923 Phan Rang, Ninh Thuận, Annam, French Indochina
- Died: 29 September 2001 (aged 78) Boston, Massachusetts, U.S.
- Party: National Social Democratic Front
- Other political affiliations: Military (1963–1967); Cần Lao (until 1963); Viet Minh (1945–1946)
- Spouse: Nguyễn Thị Mai Anh (m. 1951)
- Children: 3
- Profession: Army officer and politician

Military service
- Allegiance: State of Vietnam; South Vietnam
- Branch/service: Vietnamese National Army; Army of the Republic of Vietnam
- Years of service: 1943–1967
- Rank: Lieutenant general (Trung Tướng)
- Commands: Vietnamese National Military Academy (1956–1960); 7th Division (1960–1961); 1st Division (1961–1962); 5th Division (1962–1964); IV Corps (1964–1965)
- Battles/wars: First Indochina War; Vietnam War; 1960 coup attempt; 1963 coup
- Nguyễn Văn Thiệu's voice Recorded 27 October 1972

Nguyễn Văn Thiệu (Vietnamese: [ŋwiən˦ˀ˥ van˧˧ tʰiəw˧˨ˀ]; 5 April 1923 – 29 September 2001) was a South Vietnamese military officer and politician who was the president of South Vietnam from 1967 to 1975. He was a general in the Republic of Vietnam Armed Forces (RVNAF), became head of a military junta in 1965, and then president after winning a rigged election in 1967. He headed the government of South Vietnam until he resigned and left the nation and relocated to Taipei a few days before the fall of Saigon and the ultimate North Vietnamese victory.

Born in Phan Rang in the south central coast of Vietnam, Thiệu joined the communist-dominated Việt Minh of Hồ Chí Minh in 1945 but quit after a year and joined the Vietnamese National Army (VNA) of the French-backed State of Vietnam. He gradually rose up the ranks and, in 1954, led a battalion in expelling the communists from his native village. Following the withdrawal of France, the VNA became the ARVN and Thiệu was the head of the Vietnamese National Military Academy for four years before becoming a division commander and colonel. In November 1960, he helped put down a coup attempt against President Ngô Đình Diệm. During this time, he also converted to Catholicism and joined the regime's Cần Lao Party, which was accused of being a vehicle for political advancement.

Despite this, Thiệu agreed to join the coup against Ngô Đình Diệm in November 1963 in the midst of the Buddhist crisis, leading the siege on Gia Long Palace. Diệm was captured and executed and Thiệu made a general. Following Diệm's death, there were several short-lived juntas as coups occurred frequently. Thiệu gradually moved up the ranks of the junta by adopting a cautious approach while other officers around him defeated and sidelined one another. In 1965, stability came to South Vietnam when he became the nominal head of state and Air Marshal Nguyễn Cao Kỳ became prime minister, although the men were rivals.

In 1967, a transition to elected government was scheduled; and, after a power struggle within the military, Thiệu ran for the presidency with Kỳ as his running mate—both men had wanted the top job. To allow the two to work together, their fellow officers had agreed to have a military body controlled by Kỳ shape policy behind the scenes. Leadership tensions became evident, and Thiệu prevailed, sidelining Kỳ supporters from key military and cabinet posts. Thiệu then passed legislation to restrict candidacy eligibility for the 1971 election, banning almost all would-be opponents, while the rest withdrew as it was obvious that the poll would be a sham; Thiệu won 100% of the vote and the election was uncontested, while Kỳ retired from politics.

While Thiệu has been occasionally described as a dictator in press, in literature his regime is described as military-dominated and marked by a complex relation with pluralistic society and evolving towards authoritarianism from constitutional rule as Thiệu consolidated power, but not as a dictatorship. The government under Thiệu's presidency, at times, championed liberal ideas and oversaw a vibrant civil society and a lively press. The press accused him of turning a blind eye to and indulging in corruption. During the 1971 Operation Lam Sơn 719 and the communists' Easter Offensive, the I Corps in the north of the country was under the command of his confidant, Hoàng Xuân Lãm, whose incompetence led to heavy defeats until Thiệu finally replaced him with Ngô Quang Trưởng. After the signing of the Paris Peace Accords—which Thiệu opposed—and the US withdrawal, South Vietnam resisted the communists for another two years until the communists' final push for victory, which saw the South openly invaded by the entire North Vietnamese army. Thiệu gave contradictory orders to Trưởng to stand and fight or withdraw and consolidate, leading to mass panic and collapse in the south of the country. This allowed the communists to generate much momentum and within a month they were close to Saigon, prompting Thiệu to resign and leave the country. He eventually settled near Boston, Massachusetts, preferring not to talk to the media. He died in 2001.

== Early years ==
Born in Phan Rang on the south central coast of Vietnam, Thiệu was a son of a small, well-off landowner who earned his living by farming and fishing. Thiệu was the youngest of five children. According to some reports, Thiệu was born in November 1924, but adopted 5 April 1923, as his birthday on grounds that it was a more auspicious day. His elder brothers raised money so that he could attend the elite schools run by France, who were Vietnam's colonial rulers. Although not yet a Catholic (he converted later in life after getting married), Thiệu attended École Pellerin, a Lasallian school in Huế, the imperial seat of the Nguyễn dynasty. He returned to his hometown after graduating.

During World War II, Imperial Japan invaded French Indochina and seized control. Ninh Thuận was taken over by the Japanese in 1942, but the reaction from the locals was muted, and Thiệu continued to work the ricelands alongside his father for another three years.

== Việt Minh and Vietnamese National Army ==
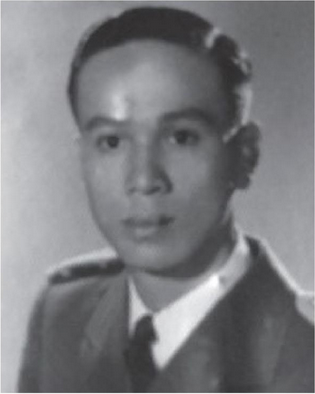
Thiệu as an infantry lieutenant (1951)

When World War II ended, Thiệu joined the Việt Minh, led by Hồ Chí Minh, whose goal was to gain independence for Vietnam from France. With no rifles, Thiệu's class of Việt Minh recruits trained in jungle clearings with bamboo. He rose to be district chief, but left the movement after just one year, following the return of the French to contest Việt Minh control. Thiệu said, "By August of 1946, I knew that Việt Minh were Communists … They shot people. They overthrew the village committee. They seized the land." He defected and moved to Saigon and joined the forces of the French-associated State of Vietnam.

With the help of his brother, Nguyễn Văn Hiếu, a Paris-trained lawyer who served in the upper echelons of the State of Vietnam government, Thiệu initially was enrolled in the Merchant Marine Academy. After a year, he was given his officer's commission, but he rejected a position on a ship when he discovered that the French owners were going to pay him less than his French colleagues. This incident was said to have made him suspicious of foreigners. Thiệu later became known for his distrust of American allies when he rose to the top of politics.

Thiệu transferred to the National Military Academy in Đà Lạt. In 1949, upon graduation, he was commissioned a 2nd Lieutenant from the first officer candidates' course of the Vietnam National Army, which had been created by former Emperor Bảo Đại who had agreed to be the Chief of State of the State of Vietnam to fight against the Democratic Republic of Vietnam of the Việt Minh. Thiệu started as the commander of an infantry platoon fighting against the Việt Minh. He quickly rose up the ranks, and was known as a good strategist, albeit cautious, with an aversion to attacking unless victory appeared almost assured. He was sent to France to train at the Infantry School at Coëtquidan, before returning home to attend the Staff College in Hanoi. Nevertheless, Thiệu was regarded as "very much a country boy, lacking the manners of more sophisticated urban dwellers who aspired to become officers". By 1954, he was a major and led a battalion that attacked a Việt Minh unit, forcing the communists to withdraw from Phan Rang. At first the Việt Minh retreated into Thiệu's old family home, confident that he would not attack his own house, but they were mistaken.

== Army of the Republic of Vietnam ==
Thiệu was a lieutenant colonel when the Republic of Vietnam (South Vietnam) was founded and officially gained full sovereignty after the withdrawal of France in 1955, following the 1954 Geneva Agreement. In 1956, he was appointed as head of the National Military Academy in Đà Lạt, and held the post for four years. There he formed ties with many of the younger officers and trainees and who went on to become his generals, colonels and majors when he ascended to the presidency a decade later. In 1957, and again in 1960, Thiệu was sent to the United States for military training. He studied at the Command and General Staff College at Fort Leavenworth, Kansas, and in weapons training at Fort Bliss, Texas, as well as at the Joint and Combined Planning School of the Pacific Command in Okinawa.

== Role in stopping 1960 anti-Diệm coup ==
On 11 November 1960, Colonels Vương Văn Đông and Nguyễn Chánh Thi launched a coup attempt against President Ngô Đình Diệm, but after surrounding the palace, they stopped attacking and decided to negotiate a power-sharing agreement. Diệm falsely promised reform, allowing time for loyalists to come to the rescue. The rebels had also failed to seal the highways into the capital to block loyalist reinforcements.

Thiệu sent infantry from his 7th Division from Biên Hòa, a town just north of Saigon, to help rescue Diệm. As the false promises of reform were being aired, Trần Thiện Khiêm's men approached the palace grounds. Some of the rebels switched sides as the power balance changed. After a brief but violent battle that killed around 400 people, the coup attempt was crushed. On 21 October 1961, Thiệu was transferred to command the 1st Division, based in Huế. He remained in the post until 8 December 1962, when General Đỗ Cao Trí took over. Twelve days later, Thiệu was appointed commander of the 5th Division, which was based in Biên Hòa, the 7th having been moved to Mỹ Tho. Diệm did not trust Thiệu's predecessor, Nguyễn Đức Thắng, but Thiệu's appointment proved to be a mistake.

== Coup against Diệm ==
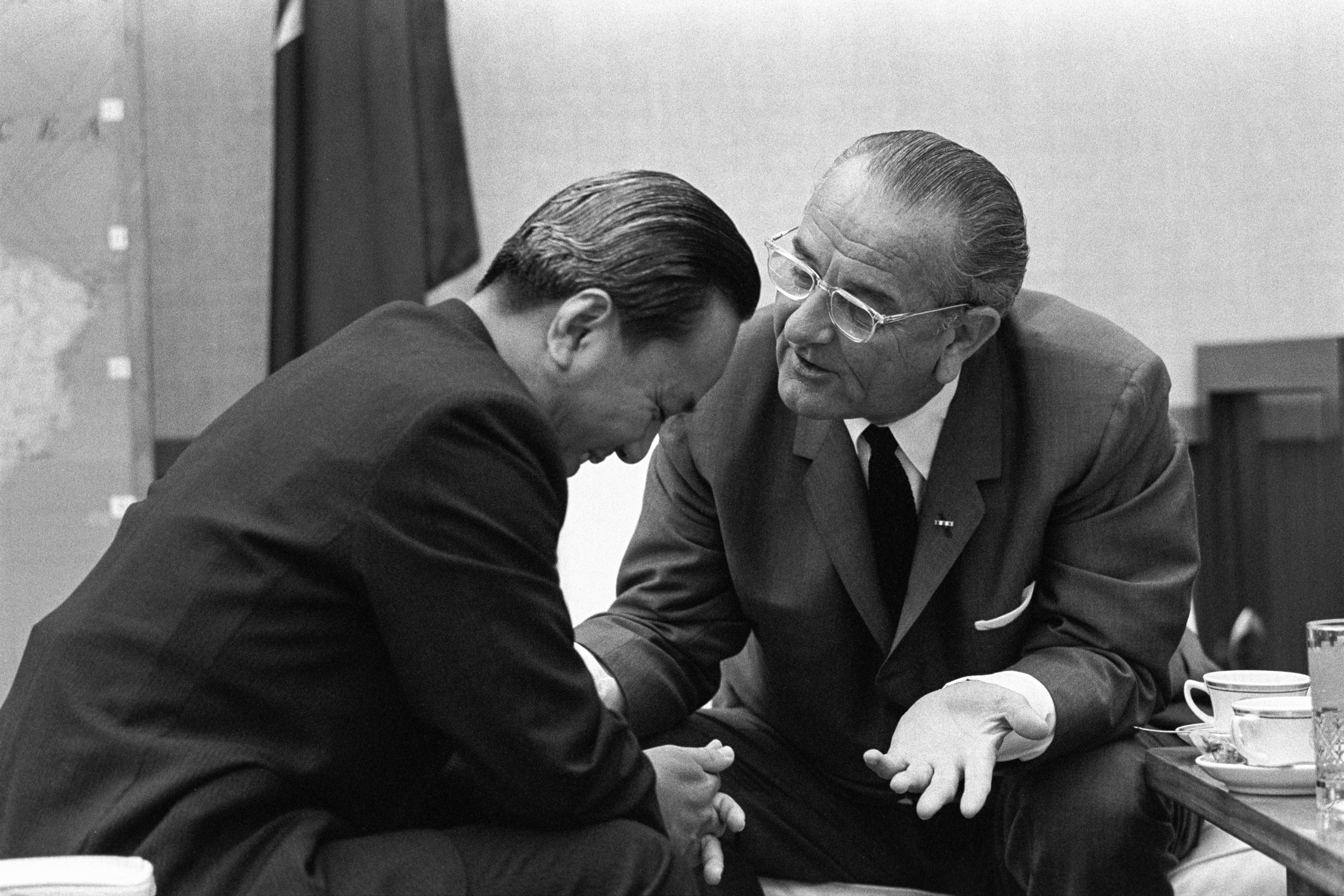
Thiệu and US President Lyndon B. Johnson

Thiệu turned against Diệm late, and led his 5th Division in the revolt. Late on the night of 1 November 1963, as light drizzle fell, Thiệu's tanks, artillery, and troops advanced towards the grounds of Gia Long Palace. A little before 22:00, infantry started the assault, covered by tank and artillery fire, which flattened the Presidential Guard barracks. Demolition units set charges to the palace, and rebel flamethrowers sprayed buildings, as the two sides exchanged gunfire. After a lull, shortly after 03:00, the shelling resumed, and just after 05:00, Thiệu ordered the start of the final stage of the siege. By 06:37, the palace fell. He was then made a general by the junta after they took power. Diệm had been promised exile by the generals, but, after escaping from the palace, was executed on the journey back to military headquarters after having been captured. Dương Văn Minh, the junta and coup leader, was generally blamed for having ordered Diệm's assassination, but there has been debate about the culpability.

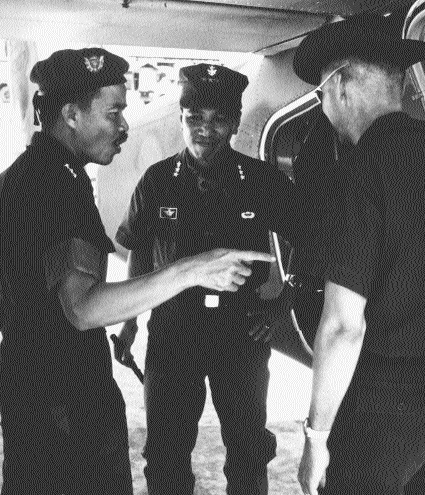
Thiệu (middle) and Nguyễn Chánh Thi (left) at Danang airfield

When Thiệu rose to become president, Minh blamed him for the assassinations. In 1971, Minh claimed that Thiệu had caused the deaths by hesitating and delaying the attack on Gia Long Palace, implying that if Diệm was captured there, junior officers could not have killed him while in a small group. General Trần Văn Đôn, another plotter, was reported to have pressured Thiệu during the night of the siege, asking him on the phone, "Why are you so slow in doing it? Do you need more troops? If you do, ask Đính to send more troops—and do it quickly because after taking the palace you will be made a general." Thiệu stridently denied responsibility and issued a statement that Minh did not dispute: "Dương Văn Minh has to assume entire responsibility for the death of Ngô Đình Diệm."

Diệm remained a taboo subject until Thiệu became president. His regime first approved of public memorial services for Diệm upon the eighth anniversary of his death in 1971, and this was the third year that such services were permitted. Madame Thiệu, the First Lady, was seen weeping at a requiem mass for Diệm at the Saigon Notre-Dame Basilica.

== Junta member ==
Thiệu was rewarded with membership in the 12-man Military Revolutionary Council led by Minh, and served as the secretary general; the leading figures in the MRC were Generals Minh, Trần Văn Đôn, Lê Văn Kim and Tôn Thất Đính.

In January 1964, III Corps' senior adviser, Colonel Wilbur Wilson recommended that the junta remove Thiệu from command of the 5th Division. In Wilson's opinion, Thiệu focused too much on politics to the detriment of his duties. The junta did nothing, but junta leader General Nguyễn Khánh sent Thiệu to the Joint General Staff not as a punishment, but as a reward for his support. On 1 February, Khánh named a new 5th division commander, Colonel (soon to be Brigadier general) Dang Thanh Liem.

In August 1964, the current junta head, Khánh, who had deposed Minh and his colleagues in January or at least heavily weakened him – as he had to formally retain Minh in recognition of the United States' will – decided to increase his authority by declaring a state of emergency, increasing police powers, banning protests, tightening censorship and allowing the police arbitrary search and imprisonment powers. He drafted a new constitution, which would have augmented his personal power. However, these moves served only to weaken Khánh as large demonstrations and riots broke out in the cities, with majority Buddhists prominent, calling for an end to the state of emergency and the abandonment of the new constitution, as well as a progression back to civilian rule.

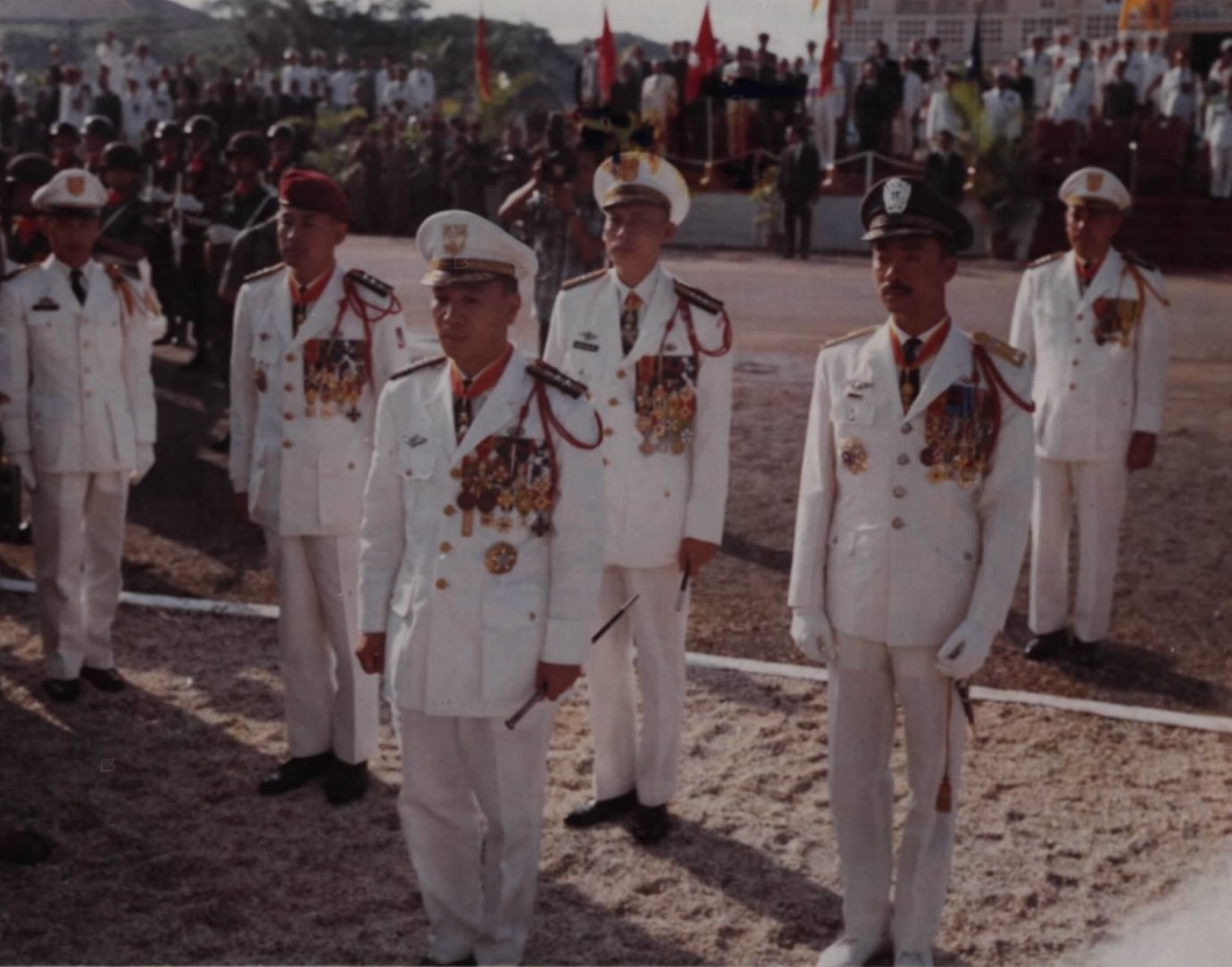
Thiệu (left, first row) and Nguyễn Cao Kỳ (right) in national arm forces day (19 June 1966)

Fearing that he could be toppled by the intensifying protests, Khánh made concessions, repealing the new constitution and police measures, and promising to reinstate civilian rule and remove the Cần Lao, a political apparatus covertly used to maintain the Diệm regime in power by seeking out dissenters, etc. Many senior officers, in particular the Catholics, such as Khiêm and Thiệu, decried what they viewed as a handing of power to the Buddhist leaders, They then tried to remove Khánh in favour of Minh again, and recruited many officers into their plot. Khiêm and Thiệu sought out US Ambassador Maxwell Taylor for a private endorsement for a coup, but, as this would have been the third coup in a few months, Taylor did not want any more changes in leadership, fearing a corrosive effect on the already unstable government. This deterred Khiêm's group from following through on their plans.

The division among the generals came to a head at a meeting of the MRC on 26/27 August. Khánh claimed the instability was due to troublemaking by members and supporters of the Catholic-aligned Nationalist Party of Greater Vietnam. Prominent officers associated with the Đại Việt included Thiệu and Khiêm. Khiêm blamed Khánh's concessions to Buddhist activists as the reason for the trouble. Thiệu and another Catholic General, Nguyễn Hữu Có, called for the replacement of Khánh with the original junta leader Minh, but the latter refused. Feeling pressured by the strong condemnations of his colleagues, Khánh said that he would resign. However, after further deadlock, Khánh, Minh, and Khiêm were put together in a triumvirate to resolve the problem, but tensions remained as Khánh dominated the decision-making.

On 15 September 1964, Thiệu became the commander of IV Corps, which oversaw the Mekong Delta region of the country, and three divisions. This came after the Buddhists had lobbied Khánh to remove General Dương Văn Đức from command of IV Corps; Đức had responded with a failed coup attempt, along with Lâm Văn Phát, on 13 September. During the coup attempt, Khiêm and Thiệu's torpor, combined with their criticism of Khánh was seen as tacit support of the rebels. US Embassy logs during the coup claimed that Thiệu and Khiêm "seem so passive that they appear to have been either tacitly supporting or associated with his move by Đức and Phát". However, after the coup faltered, the pair "issued expressions of firm support for Khánh somewhat belatedly".

Thiệu was part of a group of younger officers called the Young Turks—the most prominent apart from himself included commander of the Republic of Vietnam Air Force, Air Marshal Nguyễn Cao Kỳ, commander of I Corps General Nguyễn Chánh Thi and Admiral Chung Tấn Cang, the head of the Republic of Vietnam Navy. They and Khánh wanted to forcibly retire officers with more than 25 years of service, as they thought them to be lethargic, out of touch, and ineffective, but most importantly, as rivals for power. Specific targets of this proposed policy were Generals Minh, Trần Văn Đôn, Lê Văn Kim and Mai Hữu Xuân.

The signature of Chief of State Phan Khắc Sửu was required to pass the ruling, but he referred the matter to the High National Council (HNC), an appointed civilian advisory body, to get their opinion. The HNC turned down the request. This was speculated to be due to the fact that many of the HNC members were old, and did not appreciate the generals' negativity towards seniors. On 19 December, the generals dissolved the HNC and arrested some of the members as well as other civilian politicians. This prompted Ambassador Taylor to angrily berate Thiệu, Thi, Kỳ and Cang in a private meeting and threaten to cut off aid if they did not reverse their decision. However, this galvanized the officers around Khánh for a time and they ignored Taylor's threats without repercussions as the Americans were too intent on defeating the communists to cut funding.

Thiệu was again plotting the following month when the junta-appointed Prime Minister, Trần Văn Hương, introduced a series of war expansion measures, notably by widening the terms of conscription. This provoked widespread anti-Hương demonstrations and riots across the country, mainly from conscription-aged students and pro-negotiations Buddhists. Reliant on Buddhist support, Khánh did little to try to contain the protests, and then decided to have the armed forces take over the government, and he removed Hương on 27 January.

Khánh's action nullified a counter-plot involving Hương that had developed during the civil disorders that forced him from office. In an attempt to pre-empt his deposal, Hương had backed a plot led by some Đại Việt-oriented Catholic officers, including Thiệu and Có, who planned to remove Khánh and bring Khiêm back from Washington. The US Embassy in Saigon was privately supportive of the aim as Taylor and Khánh had become implacable enemies, but they did not fully back the move as they regarded it as poorly thought out and potentially a political embarrassment due to the need to use an American plane to transport some plotters between Saigon and Washington, and as a result, they promised asylum only for Hương if necessary. The plot continued over the next month with US encouragement, especially when evidence emerged that Khánh wanted to make a deal with the communists. Taylor told the generals that the US was "in no way propping up General Khanh or backing him in any fashion". At this stage, Taylor and his staff in Saigon thought highly of Thiệu, Có and Cang as possible replacements for Khánh. Thiệu was quoted in a Central Intelligence Agency (CIA) report as being described by an unnamed American official as "intelligent, highly ambitious, and likely to remain a coup plotter with the aim of personal advancement".

Thiệu took a cautious approach, as did Có and Cang, and they were pre-empted by Colonel Phạm Ngọc Thảo, an undetected communist double agent, who launched a coup with Phát on a hardline Catholic platform without US backing. With US support against both Khánh and the plotters, Kỳ and Thi put down the coup attempt and then ousted Khánh. This left Kỳ, Thi and Thiệu as the three most prominent members in the new junta. There were claims that Thiệu ordered the military to capture and extrajudicially kill Phạm Ngọc Thảo, who died in 1965 after a series of coup attempts between various ARVN officers. Other sources blame Kỳ. During this period, Thiệu became more prominent as other generals fought and defeated one another in coups, which forced several into exile.

== Figurehead chief of state ==
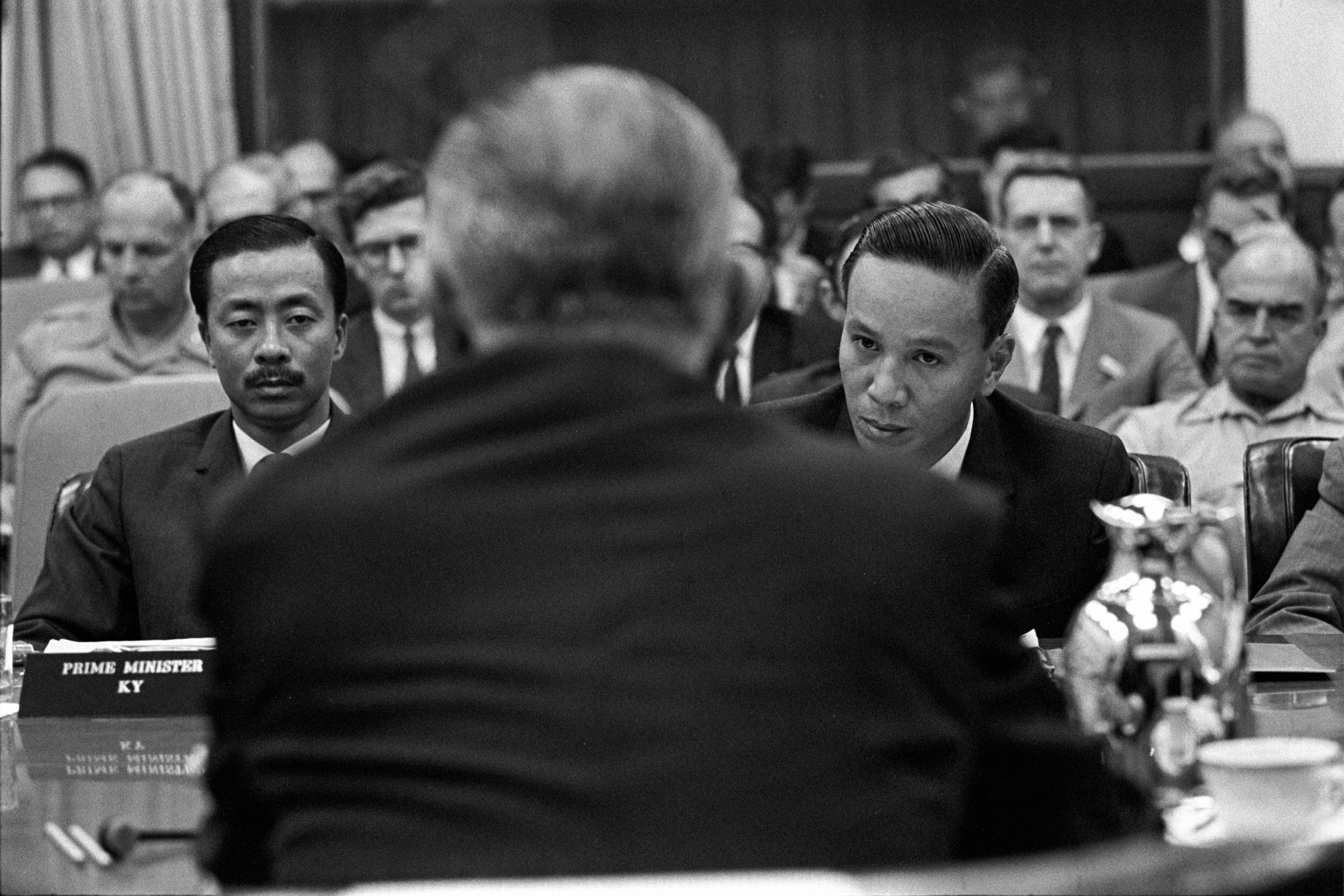
Thiệu and Vice President Nguyễn Cao Kỳ (left) meeting US President Lyndon B. Johnson (with back to camera) in Honolulu, Hawaii (1966)

In mid-1965, Thiệu became the figurehead chief of state of a military junta, with Kỳ as the prime minister. After a series of short-lived juntas, their pairing put an end to a series of leadership changes that had occurred since the assassination of Diệm.

Kỳ and Thiệu's military junta decided to inaugurate their rule by holding a "no breathing week". They imposed censorship, closed many newspapers that published material deemed unacceptable, and suspended civil liberties. They then sidelined the civilian politicians to a "village of old trees" to "conduct seminars and draw up plans and programs in support of government policy". They decided to ignore religious and other opposition groups "with the stipulation that troublemakers will be shot".

Kỳ and Thiệu were more concerned with attacking the communists than their predecessors. The generals began to mobilize the populace into paramilitary organizations. After one month, Thích Trí Quang began to call for the removal of Thiệu because he was a member of Diệm's Cần Lao apparatus, decrying his "fascistic tendencies", and claiming that Cần Lao members were undermining Kỳ. For Quang, Thiệu was a symbol of the Diệm era of Catholic domination, when advancement was based on religion. He had desired that General Thi, known for his pro-Buddhist position, would lead the country, and denounced Thiệu for alleged past crimes against Buddhists.

In 1966, with Kỳ leading the way, Thi was sacked in a power struggle, provoking widespread civil unrest in his base in I Corps; Quang led Buddhist protests against Kỳ and Thiệu and many units in I Corps began disobeying orders, siding with Thi and the Buddhist movement. Eventually, Kỳ's military forces forced the dissidents to back down and defeated those who did not. Thi was exiled and Quang put under house arrest, ending Buddhist opposition and any effective threat to Kỳ and Thiệu's regime.

== 1967 South Vietnamese Presidential election ==
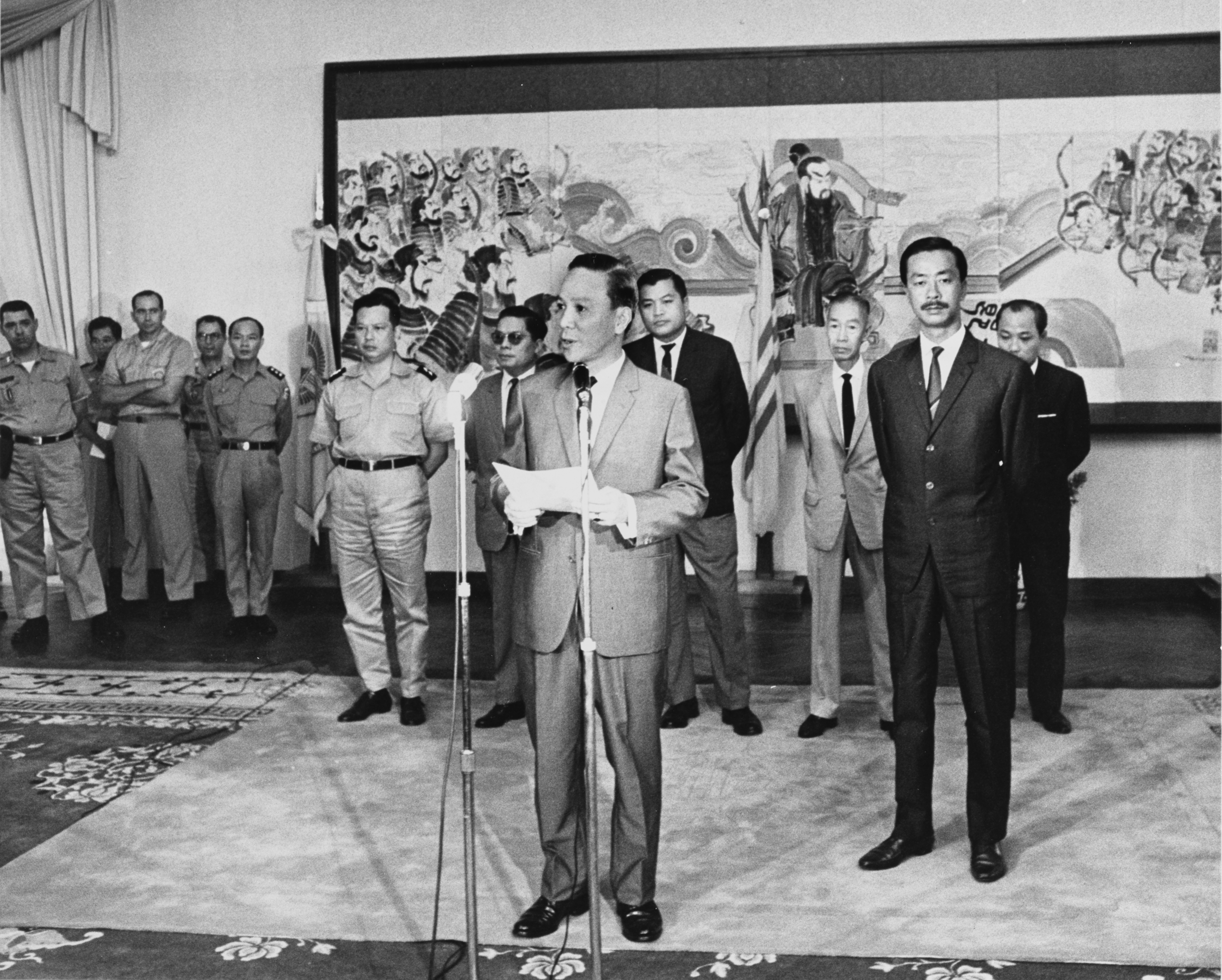
Nguyễn Văn Thiệu, Nguyễn Cao Kỳ during a press conference on the eve of the national election, 2 September 1967

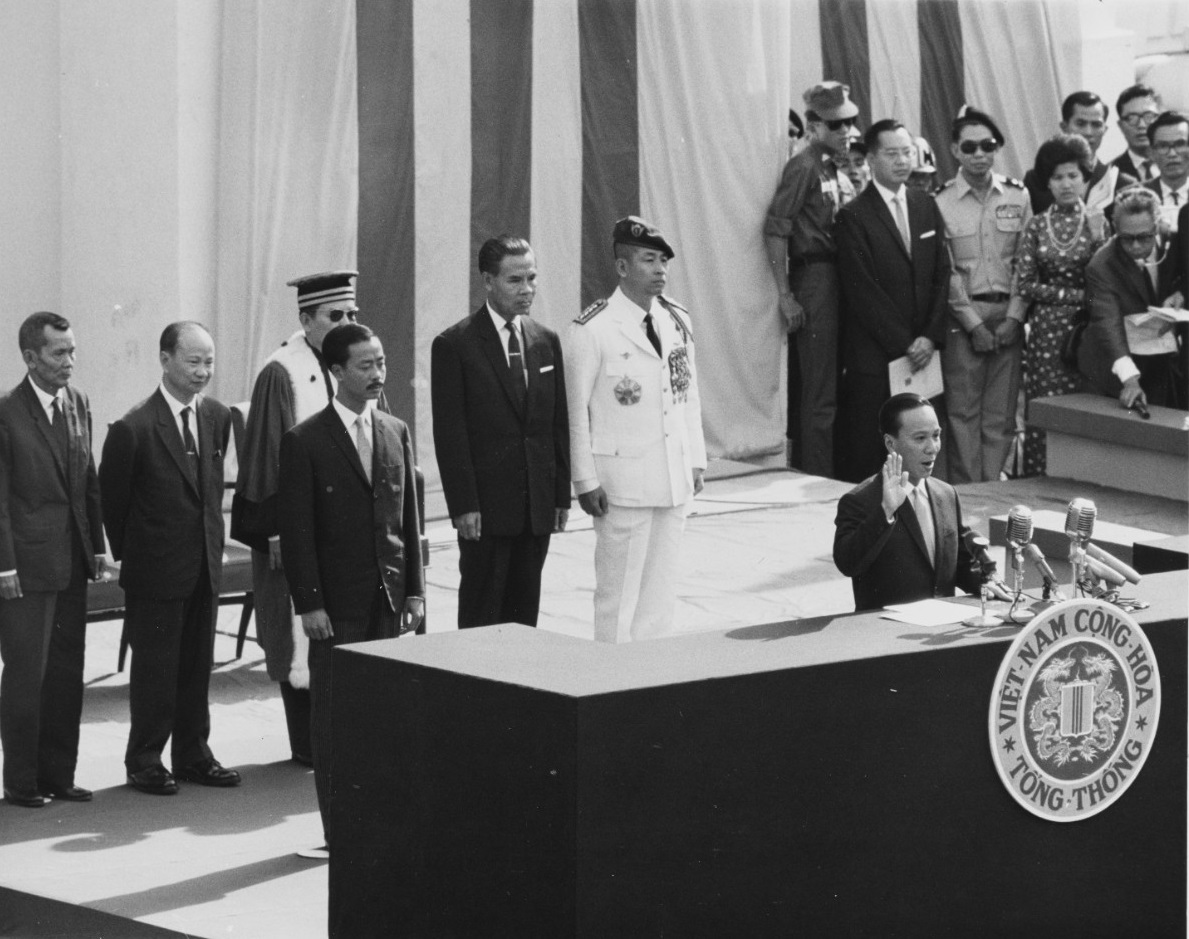
Thiệu takes the oath of office, 31 October 1967.

Under US insistence on constitutional rule, elections for the presidency and legislature were scheduled.

On 3 September 1967, Thiệu ran successfully for the presidency with Kỳ as his running mate. Thiệu took 34% of the vote and held the position until 21 April 1975. He promised democracy, social reform and vowed to "open wide the door of peace and leave it open". However, the poll was the start of a power struggle with Kỳ, who had been the main leader of South Vietnam in the preceding two years. The military had decided that they would support one candidate, and after both men wanted the job, Kỳ only backed down after being promised real influence behind the scenes through a military committee that would control proceedings. Thiệu was intent on concentrating power in his own hands.

== First term ==
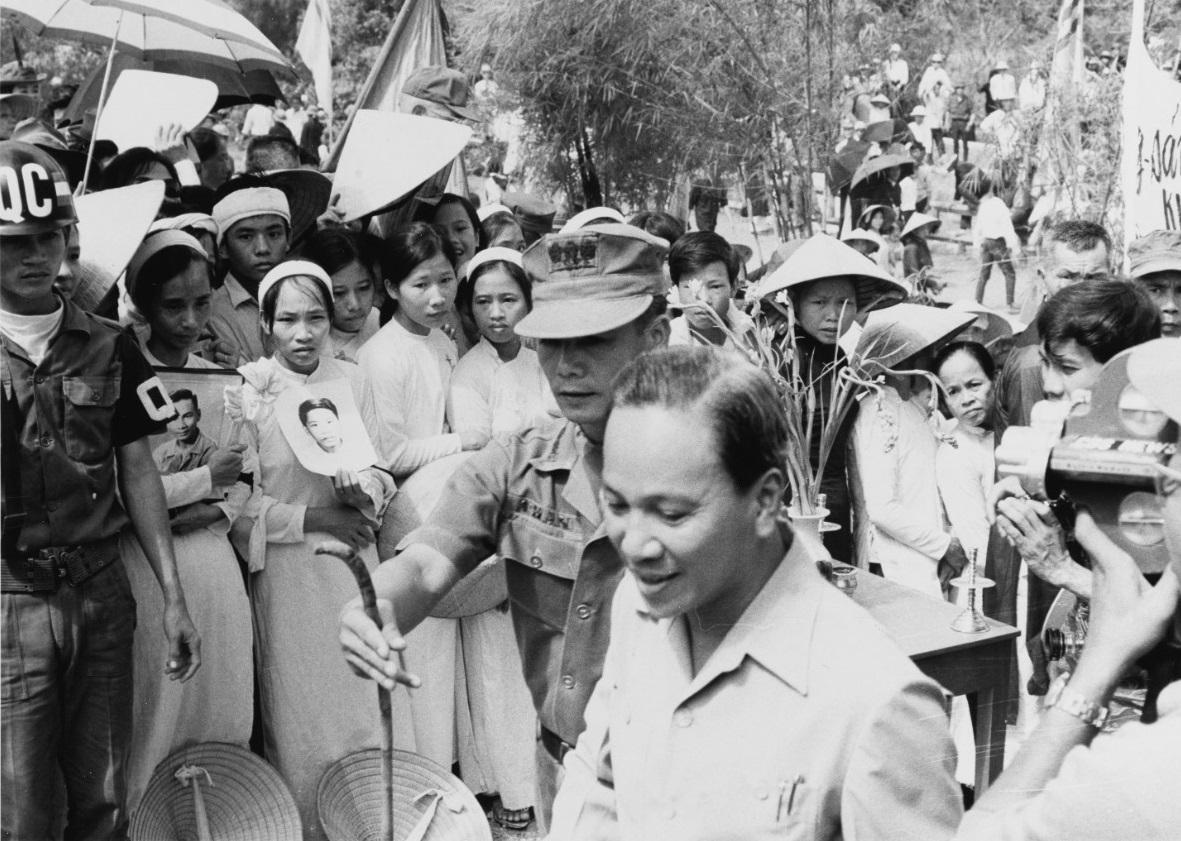
Thiệu joins mourners for the multi-faith rites for victims of the Huế Massacre (October 1968).

During the Lunar New Year of 1968, the communists launched a massive attack on the cities of Vietnam in an attempt to topple Thiệu and reunify the country under their rule. At the time of the attack on Saigon, Thiệu was out of town, having travelled to celebrate the new year at his wife's family's home at Mỹ Tho in the Mekong Delta. Kỳ, who was still in the capital, stepped into the spotlight and took command, organising the military forces in Saigon in the battle. The ARVN and the Americans repelled the communist onslaught. Kỳ's overshadowing of his superior during South Vietnam's deepest crisis further strained relations between the two men.

Although the communists were repelled and suffered heavy losses, South Vietnam suffered heavily as the conflict reached the cities for the first time in a substantial way. As ARVN troops were pulled back to defend the towns, the Việt Cộng gained in the countryside. The violence and destruction witnessed damaged public confidence in Thiệu, who apparently could not protect the citizens.

Thiệu's regime estimated the civilian dead at 14,300 with 24,000 wounded. 630,000 new refugees had been generated, joining the nearly 800,000 others already displaced by the war. By the end of 1968, 8% of the populace was living in a refugee camp. More than 70,000 homes had been destroyed and the nation's infrastructure was severely damaged. 1968 became the deadliest year of the war to date for South Vietnam, with 27,915 men killed.

In the wake of the offensive, however, Thiệu's regime became more energetic. On 1 February, Thiệu declared martial law, and in June, the National Assembly approved his request for a general mobilization of the population and the induction of 200,000 draftees into the armed forces by the end of the year; the bill had been blocked before the Tết Offensive. This increased South Vietnam's military to more than 900,000 men.

Mobilization and token anti-corruption campaigns were carried out. Three of the four ARVN corps commanders were replaced for poor performance during the offensive. Thiệu also established a National Recovery Committee to oversee food distribution, resettlement, and housing construction for the new refugees. The government perceived a new determination among the ordinary citizens, especially among previously apathetic urbanites who were angered by the communist attacks.

Thiệu used the period to consolidate his personal power. His only real political rival was Vice President Kỳ. In the aftermath of Tết, Kỳ supporters in the military and the administration were quickly removed from power, arrested, or exiled. A crack-down on the South Vietnamese press followed and there was a return of some of Diệm's Cần Lao members to positions of power. Within six months, the populace began to call him "the little dictator". Over the next few years, Kỳ became increasingly sidelined to the point of irrelevance.

According to a Newsweek report on a survey of South Vietnamese residents in Long An province, completed in January 1970, 35% of respondents supported President Nguyễn Văn Thiệu, 20% supported the Việt Cộng, and 45% supported any candidate who opposed both the Viet Cong and the United States. During the time of Thiệu, the Land to the Tiller project carried out in Vietnam from 1970 to 1973 was based on a proposal by Roy Prosterman, a prominent American "land-rights activist", who the US government of the time recruited within its efforts against Viet Cong in South Vietnam. Drawing on experiences in other countries (particularly in Latin America), Prosterman proposed a "land-to-the-tiller" program to compete with the Viet Cong for the allegiance of the peasants. The plan mimicked the communists' land expropriation strategy, coupled with monetary compensation to the former landowners. On 26 March 1970, with the war still underway, the government of South Vietnam began implementation of the Land-to-the-Tiller program following Prosterman's model. In total, the United States financed 339 million US dollars of the reform's 441 million dollars of expenses. Individual holdings were limited to 15 hectares. Legal titles were extended to peasants in areas under control of the South Vietnamese government to whom land had previously been distributed by the Viet Cong.

== Re-elected unopposed and stagnation ==
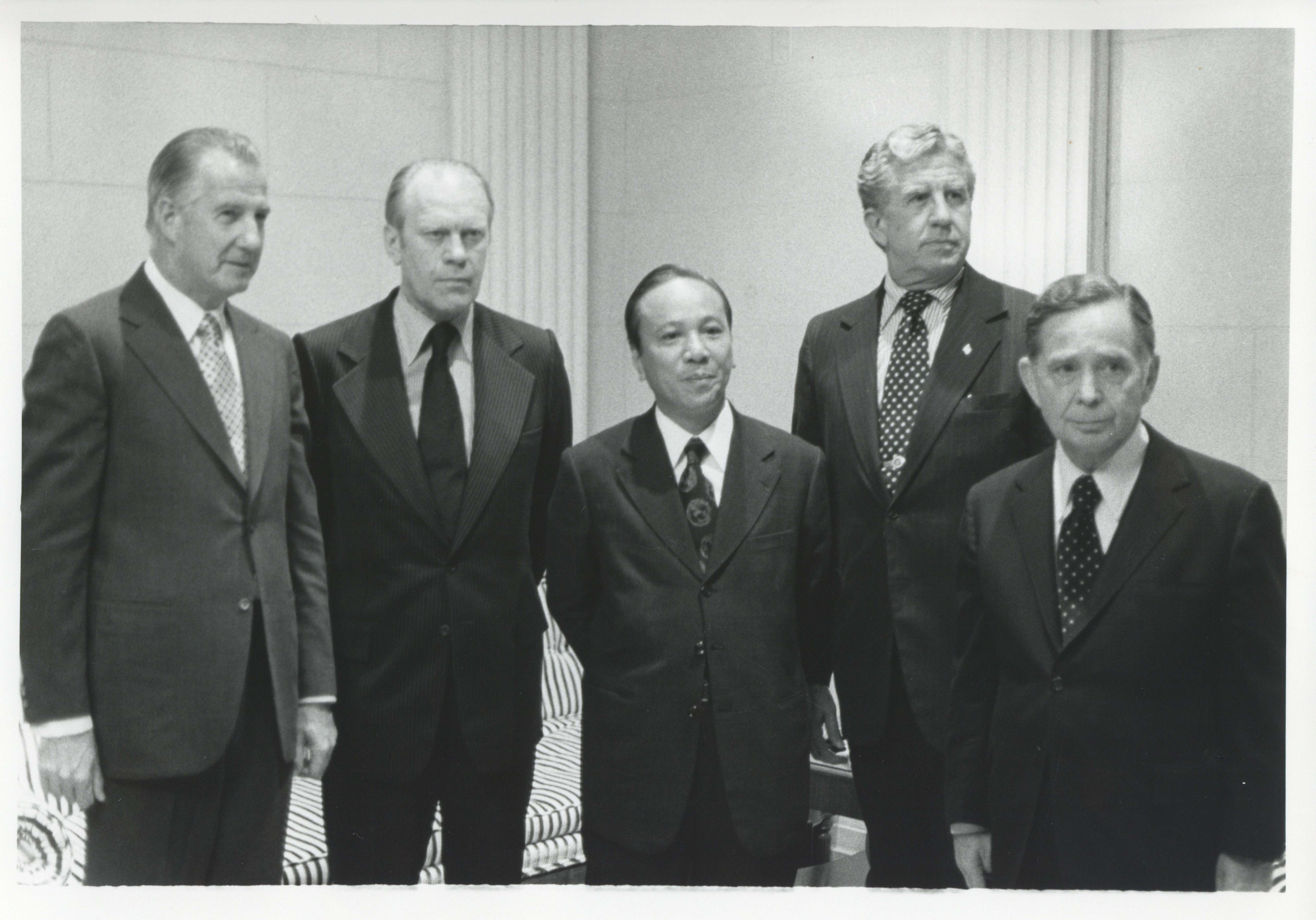
(Left to right) Vice President Spiro T. Agnew, House Minority Leader (later President) Gerald R. Ford, President Thiệu, Ambassador to South Vietnam Graham Martin and Speaker of the House Carl Albert posing for a picture on 5 April 1973

In 1971, Thiệu ran for re-election, but his reputation for corruption made his political opponents believe the poll would be rigged, and they declined to run. As the only candidate, Thiệu was thus easily re-elected on 2 October, receiving 94% of the vote on an 87% turn-out, a figure widely held to be fraudulent. The signing of the Paris Peace Accords in January 1973 failed to end the fighting in South Vietnam, as North Vietnam immediately violated the cease-fire the day prior of the signing and attempted to make territorial gains, resulting in large battles, known as War of the flags or Landgrab 73’.

In late 1973, the communists issued Resolution 21, which called for "strategic raids" against South Vietnam to gain territory and to gauge the reaction of Thiệu and the American government. This started between March and November 1974, when the communists attacked Quang Duc Province and Biên Hòa. The US failed to respond to the communist violations and the ARVN lost a lot of supplies in the fighting.

Thiệu expressed his stance on the ceasefire by publicly proclaiming the "Four Nos": no negotiations with the communists; no communist political activities south of the Demilitarized Zone (DMZ); no coalition government; and no surrender of territory to the North Vietnamese or Provisional Revolutionary Government (PRG), which went against the deal. Thiệu believed the American promise to reintroduce air power against the communists if they made any serious violations of the agreement, and he and his government also assumed that US aid would continue to be forthcoming at previous levels.

On 1 July 1973, however, the US Congress passed legislation that all but prohibited any US combat activities over or in Laos, Cambodia, and Vietnam. On 7 November, the legislative branch overrode Nixon's veto of the War Powers Act. In 1973–74, US funding was slashed to $965 million, a reduction of more than 50%. Despite Nixon's growing political difficulties and an increasingly hostile working relationship with the legislature over Vietnam, Thiệu, and most of the Saigon leadership, remained optimistic about ongoing aid. According to Vietnamese Air Force General Đổng Văn Khuyên, "Our leaders continued to believe in U.S. air intervention even after the U.S. Congress had expressly forbidden it ... [T]hey deluded themselves."

As North Vietnam needed to replenish its armed forces in 1974, Thiệu decided to go on the attack. He stretched his own forces thinly by launching offensives that regained most of the territory captured by PAVN forces during the 1973 campaign, and retook 15% of the total land area controlled by the communists at the time of the cease-fire. In April, Thiệu launched the Svay Rieng Campaign against communist strongholds in eastern Cambodia near Tây Ninh, in what was the last major ARVN offensive. While these operations were successful, the cost in terms of manpower and resources was high. By the end of the year the military was experiencing equipment shortages as a result of decreased American aid, while communist forces continued to gain strength.

By the end of October, the North Vietnamese had formulated their strategy for 1975 and 1976. In what became known as Resolution of 1975, the party leadership reported that the war had reached its "final stage". The army was to consolidate its gains, eliminate South Vietnamese border outposts and secure its logistical corridor, and continue its force build-up in the south. During 1976, the final general offensive would begin. The communists decided to start by attacking Phước Long Province, around 140 km north of Saigon.

In the meantime, morale in and supplies for the ARVN continued to fade away. Desertion increased, and only 65% of registered personnel were present. Morale fell due to Thiệu's continued policy of promoting officers on the grounds of religion, loyalty and cronyism. Corruption and incompetence were endemic, with some officers "raising it almost to an art form". Under heavy criticism, Thiệu reluctantly sacked General Nguyễn Văn Toàn, a loyalist notorious for corruption.

The aid cuts meant that an artillery piece could only fire four rounds a day, and each soldier had only 85 bullets per month. Due to lack of fuel and spare parts, air force transport operations shrank by up to 70%. Due to Thiệu's insistence on not surrendering any territory, the army was spread very thinly, defending useless terrain along a 600-mile (966 km) frontier, while the strategic reserve was occupied in static defensive roles. The situation was exacerbated by the collapse of the economy and a massive influx of refugees into the cities. Worldwide rises in fuel price due to the 1973 Arab oil embargo, and poor rice harvests throughout Asia, hit hard.

== Collapse ==
By the end of 1974, around 370,000 communist troops were in South Vietnam, augmented by ever increasing influxes of military hardware. In mid-December, the communists attacked Phước Long, and quickly gained the upper hand, besieging the city.

On 2 January 1975, Thiệu held an emergency meeting with General Dư Quốc Đống, who was in charge of the Phước Long situation, and other senior military figures. Đống presented a plan for the relief of Phước Long, but it was rejected because a lack of reserve forces of sufficient size available, a lack of airlift capability, and the belief that the besieged defenders could not hold out long enough for reinforcements. Thiệu decided to cede the entire province to the North Vietnamese, since it was considered to be less important than Tây Ninh, Pleiku, or Huế—economically, politically, and demographically.

On 6 January 1975, Phước Long City became the first provincial capital permanently seized by the communists. Less than a sixth of the ARVN forces survived. Lê Duẩn declared that "Never have we had military and political conditions so perfect or a strategic advantage so great as we have now." The communists thus decided to initiate a full-scale offensive against the central highlands, which had been named Campaign 275. General Văn Tiến Dũng planned to take Buôn Ma Thuột, using 75,000–80,000 men to surround the city before capturing it.

Major General Phạm Văn Phú, the II Corps commander, was given adequate warnings of the impending attacks, but was not worried. He thought the true objective was Pleiku or Kon Tum and that Buôn Ma Thuột was a diversion. The town was therefore lightly defended and communists outnumbered defenders by more than 8:1. The battle for Buôn Ma Thuột began on 10 March and ended only eight days later. Reinforcements were flown in, but were dismantled and fled in chaos.

On 18 March the communists took complete control of Đắk Lắk Province. ARVN forces began to rapidly shift positions in an attempt to keep the North Vietnamese from quickly pushing eastward to the coastal lowlands along Route 21. In the face of rapid communist advances, Thiệu had sent a delegation to Washington in early March to request an increase in aid. The US Ambassador Graham Martin also traveled to Washington to present the case to Gerald Ford. However, the US Congress, increasingly reluctant to invest in what was seen as a lost cause, slashed a proposed $1.45 billion military aid package for 1975 to $700 million. The Ford administration, however, continued to encourage Thiệu to believe that money would eventually come.

During this time, Thiệu was feeling the increased pressure and became increasingly paranoid. According to one of his closest advisors Nguyễn Tiến Hưng, he became "suspicious ... secretive ... and ever watchful for a coup d'état against him." His increasing isolation had begun to deny him "the services of competent people, adequate staff work, consultation, and coordination". Thiệu's military decisions were followed faithfully by his officers who generally agreed that he "made all the decisions as to how the war should be conducted."

=== Abandonment of the Central Highlands ===
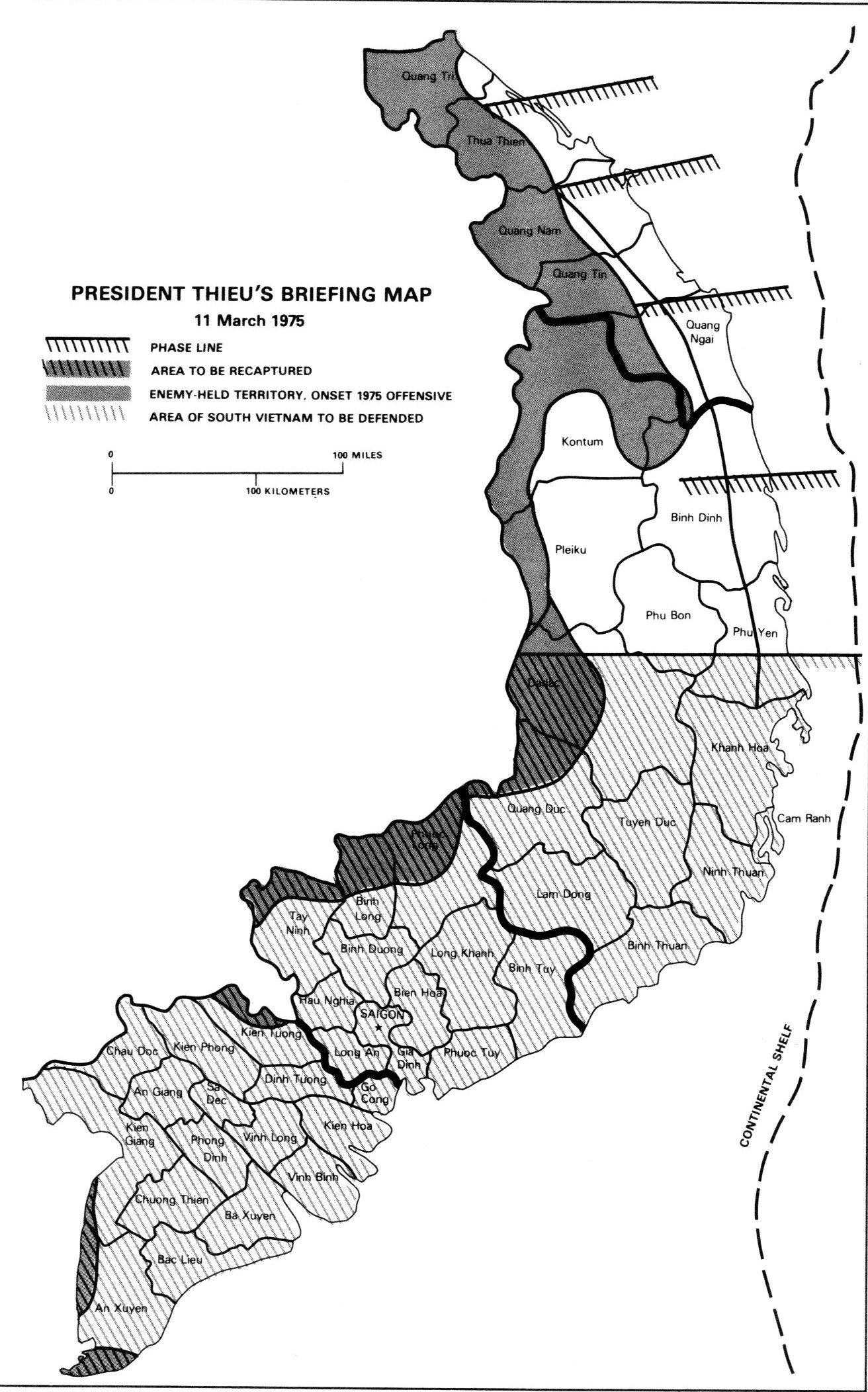
President Thiệu's briefing map

By 11 March, Thiệu concluded that there was no hope of receiving the $300 million supplemental aid package from the US. On that basis he called a meeting attended by Generals Quang and Viên. After reviewing the situation, Thiệu pulled out a small-scale map of South Vietnam and discussed the possible redeployment of the armed forces to "hold and defend only those populous and flourishing areas which were really most important".

Thiệu sketched on the map those areas which he considered most important, all of the III and IV Corps Tactical Zones. He also pointed out those areas that were currently under communist control which would have to be retaken. The key to the location of these operations were concentrations of natural resources such as rice, rubber and industries. The necessary territory included coastal areas where oil had been discovered on the continental shelf. These areas were to become, in Thiệu's words: "Our untouchable heartland, the irreducible national stronghold." With respect to the I and II Corps Zones, he drew a series of phase lines on the map indicating that South Vietnamese forces should hold what they could, but that they could redeploy southward if needed. Thiệu declared this new strategy as "Light at the top, heavy on the bottom."

The critical decision was made on 14 March when Thiệu met with Phú. Thiệu had decided to abandon Pleiku and Kon Tum so that the II Corps forces could concentrate on retaking Buôn Ma Thuột, which he considered more important. Phú then decided that the only possible means of doing this was to retreat to the coast along Interprovincial Route 7B, a dilapidated, rough track with several downed bridges, before recuperating and counterattacking back into the highlands.

The large-scale retreat of hundreds of thousands of military personnel and civilians would be dangerous. However, it was poorly planned, many senior officers were not kept informed, and some units were left behind or retreated incoherently. This was exacerbated by a three-day delay when the convoy encountered a broken bridge and had to rebuild it. The communist forces caught up, surrounded the convoy, and attacked it.

Heavy losses were incurred against the numerically dominant communists, who shelled and rocketed the soldiers and peasants alike. More bridge delays played into communist hands, and by the time the convoy reached Tuy Hòa on 27 March, it was estimated by the ARVN that only 20,000 of the 60,000 troops had survived, while only 25% of the estimated 180,000 civilians had escaped. Thiệu's order to evacuate, which was too late, had resulted in chaos and a bloodbath that left more than 150,000 dead. The planned operation to retake Buôn Ma Thuột never materialized because II Corps had been reduced to only 25% strength. Buoyed by their easy triumph the North Vietnamese overran the whole region.

=== Thiệu's collapse ===
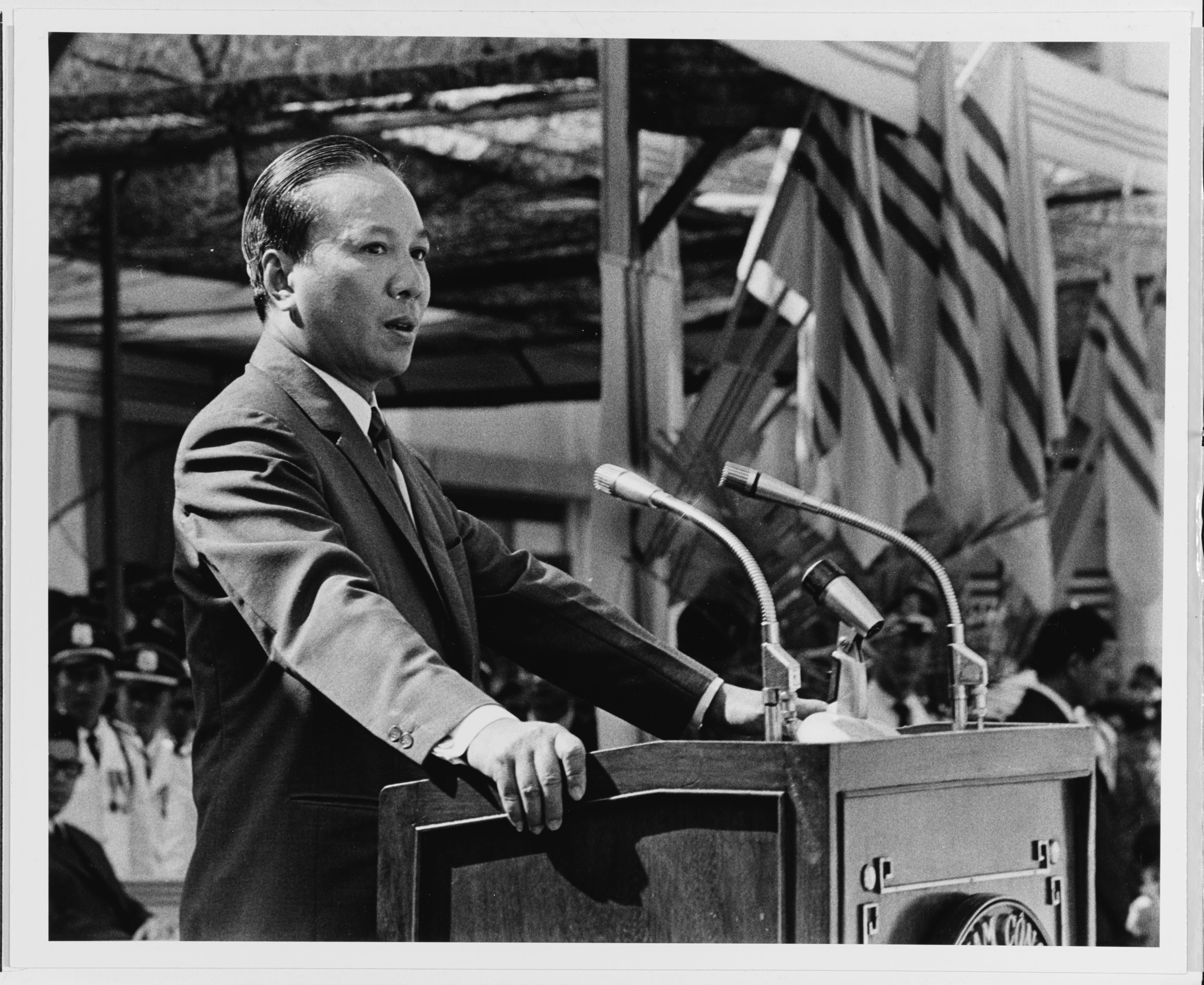
Thiệu addresses the 514 men graduating class during dedication ceremonies at the new national police academy near Saigon (1971).

However, a worse collapse occurred in the northernmost I Corps, after a series of U-turns by Thiệu. It added to the fall of the highlands, which had already earned Thiệu much criticism. I Corps fielded three infantry divisions, the elite Airborne and Marine Divisions, four Ranger Groups and an armored brigade, under the command of Ngô Quang Trưởng, regarded as the nation's finest general. Until mid-March, the North Vietnamese had only tried to cut the highways, despite having five divisions and 27 further regiments. At a meeting on 13 March, Trưởng and the new III Corps commander, Lieutenant General Nguyễn Văn Toàn briefed Thiệu. Thiệu laid out his plan to consolidate a smaller proportion. As Trưởng understood it, he was free to redeploy his forces south to hold Đà Nẵng, South Vietnam's second largest city, thereby abandoning Huế. Offshore oil deposits were thought to be nearby. Thiệu also decided to remove the Airborne and Marines, leaving I Corps exposed.

Thiệu called Trưởng to Saigon on 19 March to detail his withdrawal plan. The president then stunned Trưởng by announcing that he had misinterpreted his previous orders: The old imperial capital of Huế was not to be abandoned, despite losing two divisions. In the meantime, the withdrawal preparations and the increasing North Vietnamese pressure caused civilians to flee, clogging the highway and hampering the withdrawal. Trưởng requested permission for a withdrawal of his forces into the three enclaves as planned; Thiệu ordered him to "hold onto any territory he could with whatever forces he now had, including the Marine Division", implying that he could retreat if and when needed.

Trưởng returned to Đà Nẵng to the start of a North Vietnamese offensive. Thiệu made a nationwide radio broadcast that afternoon proclaiming that Huế would be held "at all costs", contradicting the previous order. That evening Trưởng ordered a retreat to a new defense line at the Mỹ Chánh River to defend Huế, thereby ceding all of Quảng Trị Province. He was confident that his forces could hold Huế, but was then astounded by a late afternoon message from Thiệu that ordered "that because of inability to simultaneously defend all three enclaves, the I Corps commander was free ... to redeploy his forces for the defense of Đà Nẵng only." The people of Quảng Trị and Huế began to leave their homes by the hundreds of thousands, joining an ever-growing exodus toward Đà Nẵng.

Meanwhile, the North Vietnamese closed in on Đà Nẵng amid the chaos caused by Thiệu's confused leadership. Within a few days I Corps was beyond control. The South Vietnamese tried to evacuate from the other urban enclaves into Đà Nẵng, but the 1st Division collapsed after its commander, Brigadier General Nguyễn Văn Diệm, angered by Thiệu's abandonment, told his men that "We've been betrayed ... [i]t is now "sauve qui peu" ["every man for himself"] ... See you in Đà Nẵng." The overland march, pummelled by communist artillery the entire way, degenerated into chaos as it moved toward Đà Nẵng. The remainder of the force deserted or began looting. Only a minority survived and some disillusioned officers committed suicide.

As anarchy and looting enveloped Đà Nẵng, with a defense of the city becoming impossible, Trưởng requested permission to evacuate by sea, but Thiệu, baffled, refused to make a decision. When his communications with Saigon were sundered by communist shelling, Trưởng ordered a naval withdrawal, as Thiệu was not making a decision either way.

With no support or leadership from Đà Nẵng, the evacuation turned into a costly debacle, as the communists pounded the city with artillery, killing tens of thousands. Many drowned while jostling for room on the boats; with no logistical support, those vessels sent were far too few for the millions of would-be evacuees. Only around 16,000 soldiers were pulled out, and of the almost two million civilians that packed Đà Nẵng, little more than 50,000 were evacuated. As a result, 70,000 troops were taken prisoner, along with around 100 fighter jets. During the fall of Đà Nẵng, no pitched battles had been fought. In quick succession, the few remaining cities along the coastline "fell like a row of porcelain vases sliding off a shelf" and half the country had fallen in two weeks. When his hometown of Phan Rang fell, retreating ARVN troops showed their disgust at Thiệu by demolishing his family's ancestral shrines and graves.

=== Communists close in and Thiệu resigns ===
By this time, the North Vietnamese Politburo no longer felt it necessary to wait until 1976 for the final offensive, and they sought to secure victory within two months, before the monsoon season began. On 7 April 1975, Lê Đức Thọ arrived at General Văn Tiến Dũng's headquarters near Loc Ninh to oversee the final battles. General Dũng prepared a three-pronged attack, which would seize the vital highway intersection at Xuân Lộc, the capital of Long Khánh Province and "the gateway to Saigon", before heading for Biên Hòa.

The week-long fighting that erupted on 8 April in and around Xuân Lộc, defended by the ARVN 18th Division, was the most significant engagement of the entire offensive. The South Vietnamese eventually committed 25,000 troops to the battle, almost one-third of their remaining forces. Though they managed to all but destroy 3 PAVN divisions during the battle, the 18th Division was eventually overwhelmed by a ratio of 6:1, and the communists encircled Saigon.

On 10 April, Ford went to Congress to request a US $722 million supplemental military aid package for South Vietnam plus $250 million in economic and refugee aid but Congress was not impressed. One member of Congress publicly questioned how much of a difference such an amount would make when all the previous billions of dollars in aid sent by the US had not been able to avert the situation South Vietnam was in. On 17 April the discussion ended: there would be no further military funding for Thiệu.

On 21 April 1975, Thiệu, under intense political pressure, resigned as president after losing the confidence of his closest domestic allies. In his televised farewell speech during which he was close to tears, he admitted, for the first time, having ordered the evacuation of the Central Highlands and the north that had led to debacle. He then stated that it had been the inevitable course of action considering the situation, but still blamed the generals.

In a rambling and incoherent speech, Thiệu went on to excoriate the US, attacking "our great ally, [the] leader of the free world". "The United States has not respected its promises" he declared. "It is inhumane. It is not trustworthy. It is irresponsible." He added, "The United States did not keep its word. Is an American's word reliable these days?", and "The United States did not keep its promise to help us fight for freedom and it was in the same fight that the United States lost 50,000 of its young men."

Thiệu bemoaned the American funding cuts, which he equated to desertion, saying, "You don't fight by miracles, you need high morale and bravery. But even if you are brave, you can't just stand there and bite the enemy. And we are fighting against Russia and China. We're having to bargain for aid from the United States like haggling for fish in the market and I am not going to continue this bargaining for a few million dollars when your [South Vietnamese soldiers and civilians] lives are at stake."

He criticised the American policy, saying, "You Americans with your 500,000 soldiers in Vietnam! You were not defeated...you ran away!" He lambasted US Secretary of State Henry Kissinger for signing the Paris Peace Accords, which the communists violated, and which he regarded as an American abandonment, stating "I never thought that such a good Secretary of State would produce a treaty that would bring us to our death". Thiệu also blamed the local media and foreign broadcasting organisations for lowering the morale of the military and the population by reporting on the corruption and setbacks of his government. Immediately following the speech, Vice President Trần Văn Hương took the presidency. However, the Communist tide could not be stopped. They overran what was left of the ARVN within nine days and took Saigon on 30 April 1975, ending the war.

== Life in exile ==
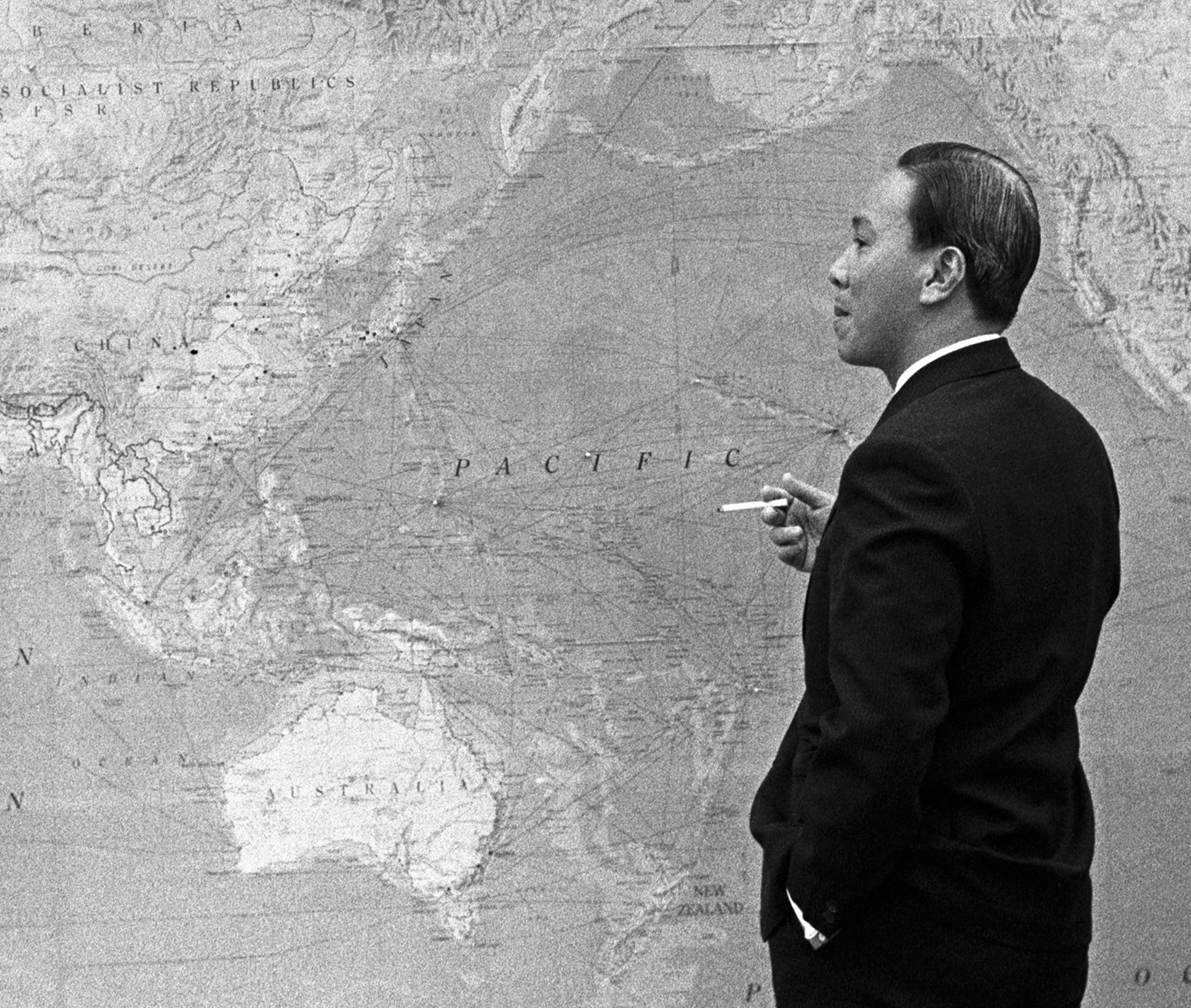
Thiệu in front of world map, during meeting with Lyndon B. Johnson in Hawaii, 19 July 1968

The new president of South Vietnam, Trần Văn Hương, thought that if Thiệu left Vietnam, North Vietnam would accept to negotiate. In his farewell speech, Thiệu said, "I resign, but I do not desert," but he fled to Taiwan on a C-118 transport plane four days later. He came as a "special envoy" of President Hương to attend the funeral of Chiang Kai-shek, who had died that same month. Thiệu initially lived in Taiwan at the house of his brother Nguyen Van Kieu, the Ambassador of South Vietnam to Taiwan before moving to a rented property in Tianmu, downtown Taipei. According to a New York Times report, Thiệu suffered from depression at this time as a result of going into exile. After a brief spell in Taiwan, he then settled in London, having obtained a visa there because his son was studying at Eton College and lived in a house in Kingston upon Thames. Thiệu kept a low profile, and in 1990 even the British Foreign Office claimed to have no information on his personal life or whereabouts. In the early 1990s, Thiệu took up residence in Foxborough, Massachusetts, where he lived reclusively. He never produced an autobiography, rarely assented to interviews and shunned visitors. Neighbours had little contact with him or knowledge of him, aside from seeing him walking his dog. He did, however, give an interview to the West German magazine Der Spiegel in 1979 and appeared in the 1980 documentary television mini-series Vietnam: The Ten Thousand Day War, discussing his time as president of South Vietnam.

Thiệu's aversion to public appearances was attributed to a fear of hostility from South Vietnamese who believed that he had failed them. He acknowledged his compatriots' low esteem of his administration in a 1992 interview, but said, "You say that you blame me for the fall of South Vietnam, you criticize me, everything. I let you do that. I [sic] like to see you do better than I." Thiệu continually predicted the demise of the Vietnamese Communist Party's grip on power and warned the United States government not to establish diplomatic relations with the communist regime. Thiệu said that when the communists are deposed and "democracy is recovered," he would return to his homeland, but their hold on Vietnam remained unchallenged during his lifetime. He futilely offered to represent the refugee community in reconciliation talks with Hanoi so exiles could be allowed to return home. In a 1993 interview, Thiệu argued that Vietnam needed to be democratized, but through a peaceful, non-violent political solution "to avoid a civil war that would perpetuate hatred for future generations." Also in this interview, he stated that he had failed to fulfill the duty entrusted to him by the people, despite having "tried to the best of his ability within his position, both for the communists and even for his allies," and declared that he "accepts full responsibility before the people and history."

Thiệu was criticized by many opponents and historians, but he was appreciated by others. The US ambassador to South Vietnam, Ellsworth Bunker, told former Secretary of Defense Melvin Laird about Thiệu: "He is an individual of very considerable intellectual capacity. He made the decision in the beginning to follow the constitutional road, not to rule with a clique of generals, which many of them expected he would do. He has been acting more and more like a politician, getting out into the country, following up on pacification, talking to people, seeing what they want." The military historian Lewis Sorley suggests that Thiệu "was arguably a more honest and decent man than Lyndon Johnson, and – given the differences in their respective circumstances – quite likely a more effective president of his country."

== Death ==
Thiệu and his wife Mai Anh celebrated their 50th wedding anniversary in Hawaii when the September 11 attacks happened. That both planes (American Airlines Flight 11 and United Airlines Flight 175) that crashed into the World Trade Center had departed from Logan International Airport in Boston, had certain psychological effects on Thiệu and also affected his health. Because much of the air travel was affected by the attacks, the couple was stuck in Hawaii for more than a week. When they got home, Thiệu's condition had worsened.

He died on 29 September 2001, aged 78, at Beth Israel Deaconess Medical Center in Boston, after he collapsed and was put on a respirator due to a stroke which he suffered at his Foxborough home. His funeral was held on 6 October 2001, in Newton, Massachusetts. He was cremated and the location of his ashes is unknown. According to Mai Anh, before his death, Thiệu expressed his wish to be buried in his hometown of Phan Rang, otherwise his ashes were to be scattered half into the sea and half on the mountain.

== Personal life ==
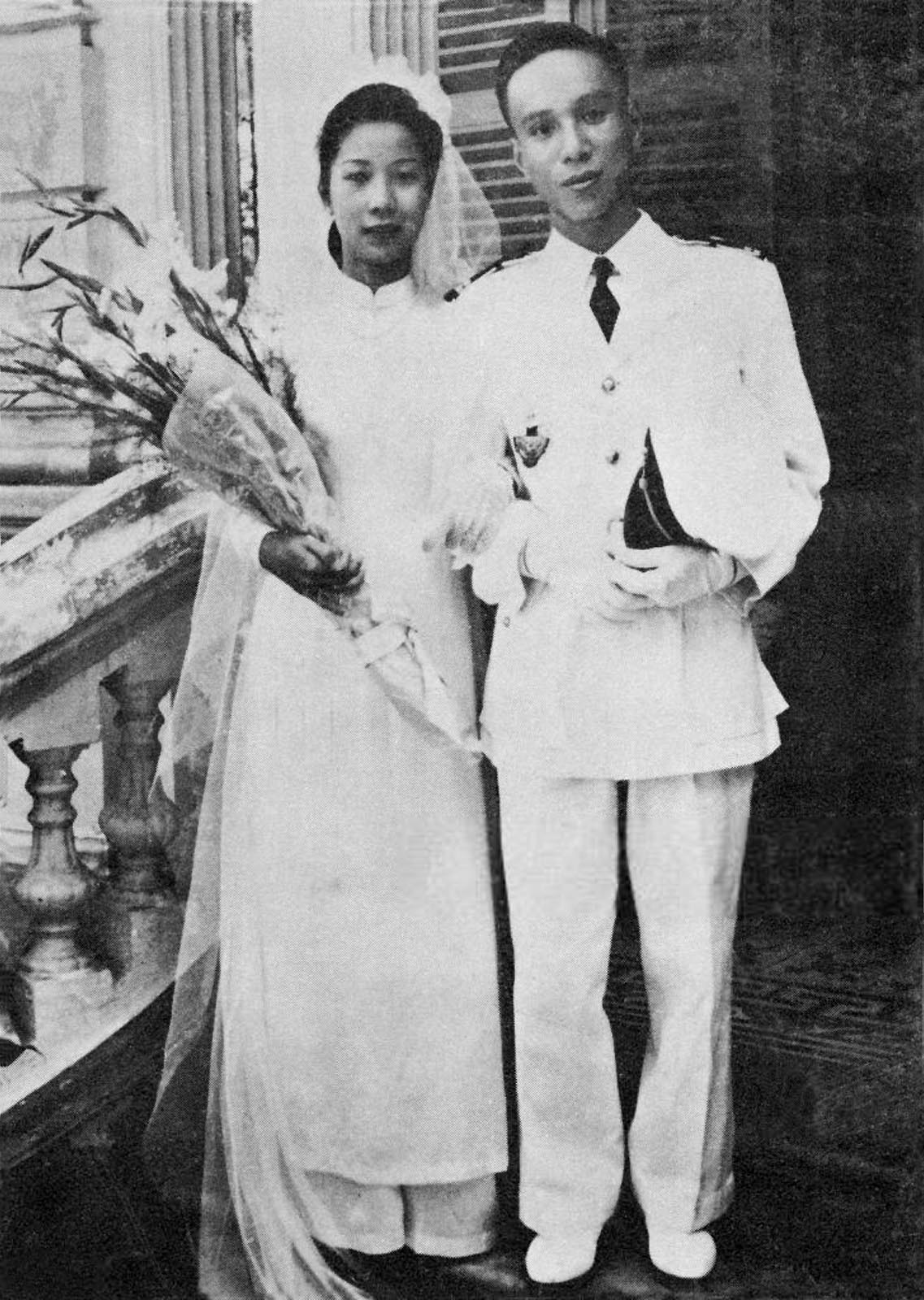
Marriage of Nguyễn Văn Thiệu and Nguyễn Thị Mai Anh (1951)

In 1951, Thiệu married Nguyễn Thị Mai Anh, the daughter of a wealthy herbal medicine practitioner from the Mekong Delta. She was a Roman Catholic, and Thiệu converted to Catholicism in 1958. Critics claimed that he did so in order to improve his prospects of rising up the military ranks, because Diệm was known to favor Catholics. The couple had two sons and one daughter.

He spoke Vietnamese, English and French fluently.

== Awards and decorations ==
- South Vietnam:
  - National Order of Vietnam (Grand Cross)
  - National Order of Vietnam (Commander)
  - Army Distinguished Service Order (1st class)
  - Air Force Distinguished Service Order (1st class)
  - Navy Distinguished Service Order (1st class)
  - Military Merit Medal
  - Good Conduct Medal (2nd class)
  - Military Service Medal (2nd class)
  - Armed Forces Honor Medal (1st class)
  - Vietnamese Gallantry Cross with 3 palms
  - Army Meritorious Service Medal
  - Vietnam Campaign Medal
- France:
  - Croix de guerre des théâtres d'opérations extérieures
- Morocco:
  - Grand Officer of the Order of Ouissam Alaouite (1953)
- South Korea:
  - Honorary Recipient of the Grand Order of Mugunghwa (1969)
- Taiwan:
  - Grand Cordon of the Order of Brilliant Jade (1969)
- United States:
  - Commander of the Legion of Merit

== Sources ==
- Cao Van Vien (1983). The Final Collapse. Washington, D.C.: United States Army Center of Military History. ISBN 9781410219558. Archived from the original on 1 March 2015.
- Dong Van Khuyen (1979). The RVNAF. Washington, D.C.: United States Army Center of Military History.
- Dougan, Clark; Fulghum, David; et al. (1985). The Fall of the South. Boston: Boston Publishing Company. ISBN 0939526166.
- Dougan, Clark; Weiss, Stephen; et al. (1983). Nineteen Sixty-Eight. Boston, Massachusetts: Boston Publishing Company. ISBN 0939526069.
- Hammer, Ellen J. (1987). A Death in November: America in Vietnam, 1963. New York: E. P. Dutton. ISBN 0-525-24210-4.
- Hoang Ngoc Lung (1978). The General Offensives of 1968–69. McLean, Virginia: General Research Corporation.
- Hosmer, Stephen T.; Konrad Kellen; Jenkins, Brian M. (1980). The fall of South Vietnam : statements by Vietnamese military and civilian leaders. New York: Crane, Russak. ISBN 0844813451.
- Isaacs, Arnold R. (1983). Without Honor: Defeat in Vietnam and Cambodia. Baltimore, Maryland: Johns Hopkins University Press. ISBN 0801830605.
- Jacobs, Seth (2006). Cold War Mandarin: Ngo Dinh Diem and the Origins of America's War in Vietnam, 1950–1963. Lanham, Maryland: Rowman & Littlefield. ISBN 0-7425-4447-8.
- Joes, Anthony J. (1990). The War for South Vietnam, 1954–1975. New York: Praeger. ISBN 0275938921.
- Jones, Howard (2003). Death of a Generation: how the assassinations of Diem and JFK prolonged the Vietnam War. New York: Oxford University Press. ISBN 0-19-505286-2.
- Kahin, George McT. (1986). Intervention : how America became involved in Vietnam. New York: Knopf. ISBN 039454367X.
- Karnow, Stanley (1997). Vietnam: A history. New York: Penguin Books. ISBN 0-670-84218-4.
- Langguth, A. J. (2000). Our Vietnam: the war, 1954–1975. New York: Simon & Schuster. ISBN 0-684-81202-9.
- Le Gro; William E. (1981). From Cease-Fire to Capitulation. Washington, D.C.: United States Army Center of Military History.
- Lipsman, Samuel; Weiss, Stephen (1985). The False Peace: 1972–74. Boston, Massachusetts: Boston Publishing Company. ISBN 0-939526-15-8.
- McAllister, James (November 2004). ""A Fiasco of Noble Proportions": The Johnson Administration and the South Vietnamese Elections of 1967". The Pacific Historical Review. 73 (4). Berkeley, California: University of California Press: 619–651. doi:10.1525/phr.2004.73.4.619.
- McAllister, James (2008). "'Only Religions Count in Vietnam': Thich Tri Quang and the Vietnam War". Modern Asian Studies. 42 (4). New York: Cambridge University Press: 751–782. doi:10.1017/s0026749x07002855. S2CID 145595067.
- Military History Institute of Vietnam (2002). Victory in Vietnam: A History of the People's Army of Vietnam, 1954–1975. trans. Pribbenow, Merle. Lawrence, Kansas: University Press of Kansas. ISBN 0700611754.
- Moyar, Mark (2004). "Political Monks: The Militant Buddhist Movement during the Vietnam War". Modern Asian Studies. 38 (4). New York: Cambridge University Press: 749–784. doi:10.1017/S0026749X04001295. S2CID 145723264.
- Moyar, Mark (2006). Triumph Forsaken: The Vietnam War, 1954–1965. New York: Cambridge University Press. ISBN 0521869110.
- Nguyen Tien Hung; Schecter, Jerrold L. (1986). The Palace File. New York: Harper & Row. ISBN 0060156406.
- Penniman, Howard R. (1972). Elections in South Vietnam. Washington, D.C.: American Enterprise Institute for Public Policy Research.
- Smedberg, Marco (2008). Vietnamkrigen: 1880–1980. Lund, Scania: Historiska Media. ISBN 978-9185507887.
- Snepp, Frank (1977). Decent Interval: An Insider's Account of Saigon's Indecent End Told by the CIA's Chief Strategy Analyst in Vietnam. New York: Random House. ISBN 0394407431.
- Truong Nhu Tang (1986). Journal of a Vietcong. Cape. ISBN 0224028197.
- Willbanks, James H. (2004). Abandoning Vietnam: How America Left and South Vietnam Lost Its War. Lawrence, Kansas: University Press of Kansas. ISBN 0-7006-1331-5.
- Zaffiri, Samuel (1994). Westmoreland. New York: William Morrow. ISBN 0688111793.
- Luu, Trinh M.; Vu, Tuong, eds. (2023). Republican Vietnam, 1963–1975: War, Society, Diaspora. University of Hawaiʻi Press. ISBN 978-0-8248-9518-1.

Political offices
Preceded by Trần Văn Minh	Minister of National Defense of South Vietnam; 1965	Succeeded by Nguyễn Hữu Có
Preceded by Ngô Đình Diệm	President of South Vietnam; 1967–1975	Succeeded by Trần Văn Hương
