= Xinbo Ruan =

Xinbo Ruan is from the Nanjing University of Aeronautics and Astronautics, Nanjing, China. He was named Fellow of the Institute of Electrical and Electronics Engineers (IEEE) in 2016 for contributions to switching-mode power converter topologies and modulation strategies.

Ruan obtained his B.S. and Ph.D. degrees in electrical engineering from Nanjing University of Aeronautics and Astronautics in 1991 and 1996, respectively. After graduation, he joined the College of Automation Engineering where by 2002 he attained the status of professor. Between 2008 and 2011, Ruan was at the College of Electrical and Electronic Engineering of Huazhong University of Science and Technology in China. From 2005 to 2013, he served as Vice President of the China Power Supply Society, and following it, became an associate editor for the IEEE Transactions on Industrial Electronics, the IEEE Journal of Emerging and Selected Topics on Power Electronics, the IEEE Transactions on Power Electronics and the IEEE Transactions on Circuits and Systems-II.
