= Phrapathom Wittayalai School =

Coordinates: 13.820125°N 100.075514°E

- โรงเรียนพระปฐมวิทยาลัย

Information
- Other name: Pra-pa-thom
- Opened: 23 January 1909
- Area: 24 rai 1 ngan 24 square wah

Phrapathom Wittayalai School (Thai: โรงเรียนพระปฐมวิทยาลัย, also known as Pra-pa-thom) which the earliest name was The Model School of Nakhonchaisri District. It was opened on 23 January 1909. In 1932 the name had been changed to The School of Nakhon Pathom Province Phrapathom Wittayalai and in 1956 to Phrapathom Wittayalai School. The area is 24 rai 1 ngan 24 square wah. It consists of 8 learning buildings and many other buildings such as multi-purpose building, Wanichaiyawan building, and Industrial buildings.

== School emblem ==
- Slogan : "I will do my best."
- School Badge : Shining Phra Pathommachedi flowing on clouds.
- School Flag : The flag is a blue rectangle. There is a shield with wings at the center and there is Phrapathom Jedi with 7 lightning shines in the middle of the shield, and there is a school’s name under the shield.

== School color ==
Blue represent to courage, intelligence, and patients.

Yellow represent to good manners, tidy, and moral.

== History ==
Phrapathom Wittayalai School has been opened on 23 January 1909. Its classroom starts from primary to secondary school. Its name was the Sample School of Nakhonchaisri District.

- 1921: The school's name had been changed to Nakornchaisri Phra Pathom School.
- 1932: The government ordered the dissolution of Nakhon Chaisri. The school had been changed its name to Nakhon Pathom Province School Prathom College
- 1951: The Ministry of Education has ordered the renaming of schools across the country. The school must be changed its name again to Nakhon Pathom Wittayalai School.
- 1956: The school had been opened for higher education and has been renamed to Phrapathom Wittayalai School which is used nowaday.
- 1972: The school was allowed to open adult education schools.
- 1993: The school was opened as a coeducational school in junior high school. There were 150 first female students and later became a coeducational school.
