= Trần Thị Hoa =

South Vietnamese politician (1924–2010)

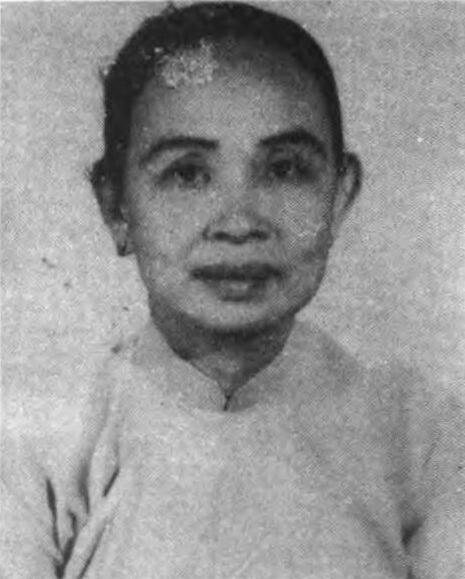
- Official portrait, 1968

Member of the House of Representatives of South Vietnam
- In office 31 October 1967 – 30 April 1975 Serving with: Doàn Văn Cương (1967–1971); Nguyễn Văn Huê (1967–1971); Mã Xái (1967–1975); Dương Minh Quang (1971–1975); Lê Quang Liêm (1971–1975); Nguyễn Hữu Hiếu (1971–1975)
- Preceded by: Position established
- Succeeded by: Position abolished
- Constituency: An Giang province

Personal details
- Born: 12 May 1924 Sa Đéc province, Cochinchina, French Indochina
- Died: 9 October 2010 (aged 86) California, U.S.
- Party: Vietnamese Democratic Socialist Party
- Spouse: Lê Quang Vinh (m. 1946; died 1956)
- Profession: Businessperson; Politician
- Nickname: Phấn

Trần Thị Hoa (12 May 1924 – 9 October 2010) was a South Vietnamese businesswoman and politician who served as a member of the House of Representatives (lower house) of the Republic of Vietnam from October 1967 until the collapse and surrender of South Vietnam on 30 April 1975 to the PAVN by President Dương Văn Minh. She was the wife of notable Hòa Hảo military commander Ba Cụt.

== Biography ==
She was born on 12 May 1924 in Lai Vung district, Sa Đéc province, Cochinchina, French Indochina. In 1946, she married a prominent Hòa Hảo leader named Ba Cụt with whom she had six children with. She was also an ardent follower of Hòa Hảo, a Vietnamese new religious movement that is syncretistic folk religion and a sect of Buddhism.

=== Life in exile ===
On 13 July 1956 her husband was sentenced to death by President Ngô Đình Diệm's regime for his involvement in the 1955 Battle of Saigon fighting alongside the crime syndicate Bình Xuyên in attacking and looting towns and engaging in battle with the government forces, the Vietnamese National Army. As a result, she and her family were exiled to Cambodia where she would live for a little over seven years until the 1963 South Vietnamese coup, which led to the arrest and assassination of Ngô Đình Diệm and his brother Ngô Đình Nhu, she returned to Vietnam.

=== Political career ===
She entered politics by running for a seat in the lower house of the National Assembly in the 1967 South Vietnamese parliamentary election and prevailed, representing An Giang province. She assumed office on 31 October 1967. She sought reelection to a second term in the 1971 South Vietnamese parliamentary election, in which she was successful. On 27 April 1975, Hoa and the majority of the members of the National Assembly present voted in the affirmative in approving General Dương Văn Minh's ascendancy to the presidency from President Trần Văn Hương in hopes that with Minh in power, the negotiation peace talks go smoothly but to no avail.

=== Fall of Saigon and second life in exile ===
On 30 April 1975 after South Vietnam's takeover by the Hanoi regime in North Vietnam, Hoa and those that had connections to the former Saigon government and the U.S. were sent to re-education camps where they forced to perform hard labor along with forced indoctrination of Communist propaganda. She was sentenced to a camp in the jungle of Hàm Tân district where she would spend five years before being released. Afterward, she immigrated to Belgium and later resettled to the United States after being sponsored by her children. During, her remaining years, she was heavily present in Overseas Vietnamese activities, such as being outspoken of the regime of the Socialist Republic of Vietnam and an advocate for religious freedom, particularly for followers of Hòa Hảo. She also published books and wrote memoirs of her late husband. She died in California at the age of 86 on 9 October 2010.

Political offices
Preceded by Position established	Member of the House of Representatives of the Republic of Vietnam from An Giang province 1967–1975	Succeeded by Position abolished
