= Nguyễn Bá Cẩn =

Penultimate Prime Minister of South Vietnam in 1975

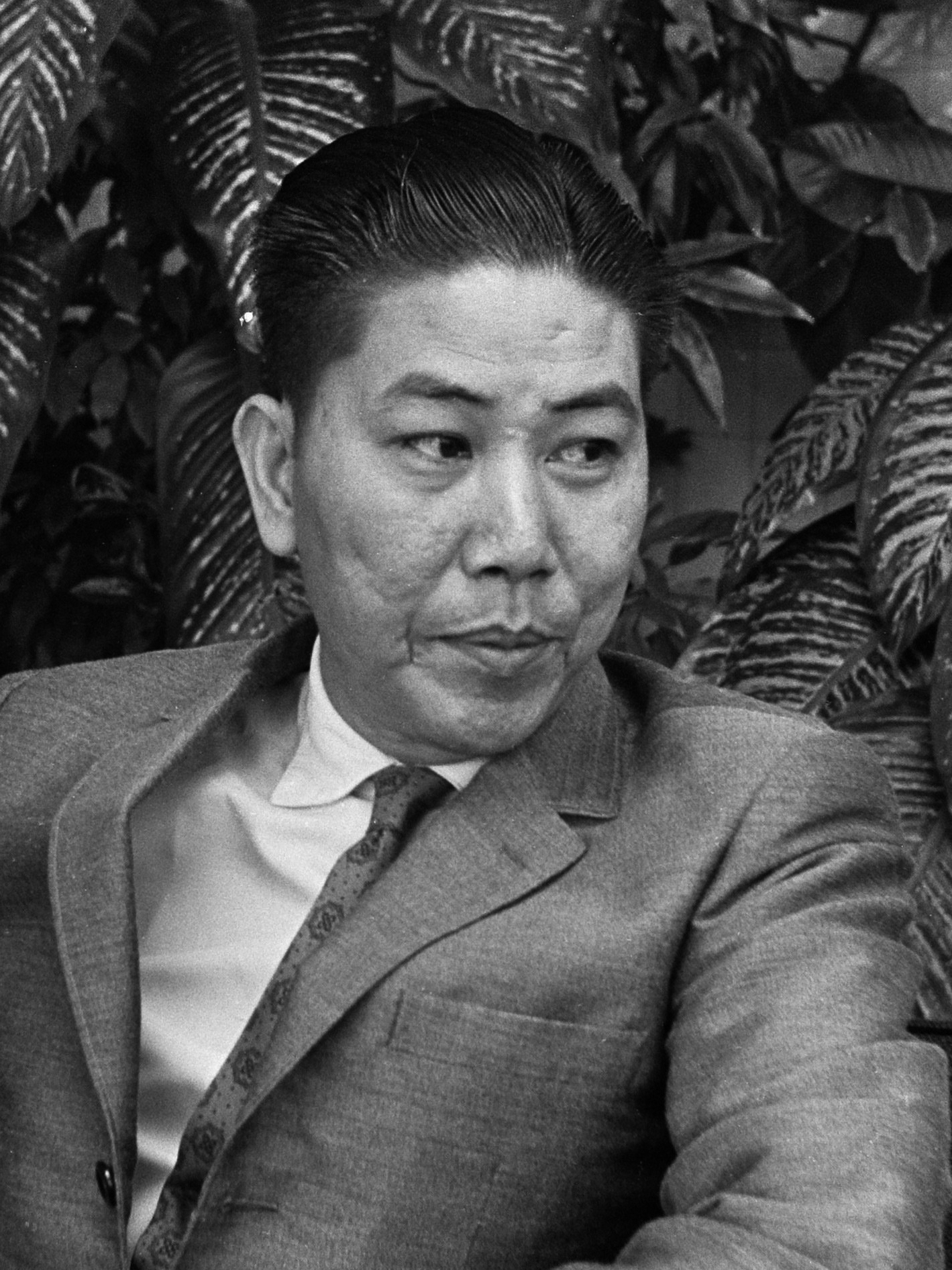
- Cẩn in 1968

9th Prime Minister of South Vietnam
- In office 4 April 1975 – 28 April 1975
- President: Nguyễn Văn Thiệu (4/4-21/4 1975); Trần Văn Hương (21/4-28/4 1975)
- Deputy: Dương Kích Nhưỡng (First Deputy); Trần Văn Đôn (Second Deputy)
- Preceded by: Trần Thiện Khiêm
- Succeeded by: Vũ Văn Mẫu

2nd Speaker of the House of Representatives of South Vietnam
- In office 3 December 1971 – 4 April 1975
- Preceded by: Nguyễn Bá Lương
- Succeeded by: Phạm Văn Út

Member of the House of Representatives of South Vietnam
- In office 31 October 1967 – 4 April 1975 Serving with: Nguyễn Văn Đầu (1967–1971); Phạm Văn Trọng (1971–1975); Đào Bá Ngọc (1971–1975); Phạm Thành Ngọc (1971–1975)
- Preceded by: Position established
- Succeeded by: Position abolished
- Constituency: Định Tường province

Personal details
- Born: 9 September 1930 Cần Thơ, Cochinchina, French Indochina
- Died: 20 May 2009 (aged 78) San Jose, California, U.S.
- Party: Vietnam Workers and Farmers Party
- Other political affiliations: National Social Democratic Front (Big tent affiliation)
- Spouse: Elizabeth Nguyễn Thị Tu (m. 1950)
- Children: 3 (1 son; 2 daughters)
- Education: Dalat Ecole d'Administration (BA); Thủ Đức Military Academy

Nguyễn Bá Cẩn (Vietnamese: [ŋwiən˦ˀ˥ ʔɓaː˧˦ kən˧˩]; 9 September 1930 – 20 May 2009) was a South Vietnamese politician who served as the penultimate Prime Minister of South Vietnam from 4 April 1975 until 28 April 1975, serving under Presidents Nguyễn Văn Thiệu (4 April to 21 April) and Trần Văn Hương (21 April to 28 April). Before becoming prime minister, he was a member of the lower house (House of Representatives) of the National Assembly representing Định Tường province and served as the second Speaker of the lower house.

== Biography ==
=== Early life and political career ===
He was born on 9 September 1930 in Cần Thơ, Cochinchina, French Indochina into a family of wealthy farmers. In December 1950, he married Elizabeth Nguyễn Thị Tu, a Roman Catholic with whom he had one son and two daughters with. In 1951, he enlisted in the army to study in the First Course of the Thủ Đức Military Academy. After graduating in 1953, he continued his education by registering for and passing the entrance exam to the Dalat Ecole d'Administration in 1954. From 1954 to 1957, he attended the Dalat Ecole d'Administration in which he graduated as valedictorian with a baccalaureate in administration.

He started his political career with the position of Chief of Cái Bè District, Định Tường (1958); Deputy Governor Định Tường (1959); Deputy Governor Phước Tuy (1962); then Deputy Governor of Long An Province (1964).

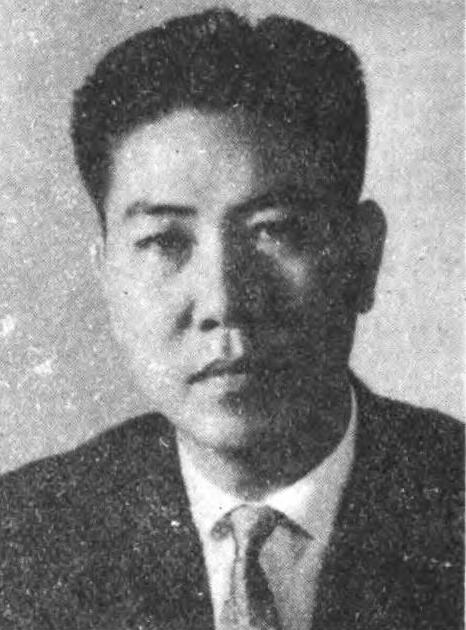
Cẩn's official portrait as a member of the National Assembly, 1968

In 1967 during the Second Republic, he was elected to the Lower House of the National Assembly, representing Định Tường province. Soon afterward, he was appointed as the Second Vice Chairman of the House of Representatives. At the end of 1967, he cooperated with Congressman Đặng Văn Sung of the Alliance of Farmers and Engineers in the Senate to establish the Bicameral Social Democratic Union. In 1969, this bloc joined forces with Mr. Trần Quốc Bửu, Chairman of the Vietnam General Confederation of Workers, to establish the Vietnam Workers' Party, with Mr. Trần Quốc Bửu as Chairman, and he became General Secretary. He was reelected for a second term in the 1971 South Vietnamese parliamentary election. During his second term (1971–1975), he was elected as the second Speaker of the House of Representatives.

=== Prime Minister of South Vietnam (April 1975) ===
In March 1975, after the army of North Vietnam had taken control of most of the Central region and the highlands, under pressure from the United States, there was a need for a sweeping reform of the composition of the government to stabilize the country, internal affairs in the South and had enough strength to engage in dialogue with the Communists, President Nguyễn Văn Thiệu invited him to take the position of Prime Minister, replacing the incumbent Prime Minister Trần Thiện Khiêm who had just resigned.

On 14 April 1975, he presented the Cabinet list with the title "Government of National Unity" to President Thiệu. Mr. Cẩn heads a Cabinet that has many experts and politicians considered "strong" many times more than the previous Saigon cabinet.

- Deputy Prime Minister: Engineer Dương Kích Nhưỡng (in charge of Relief and Settlement)
- Deputy Prime Minister: Dr. Nguyễn Văn Hảo (in charge of Agriculture and Industry)
- Deputy Prime Minister & Minister of National Defense: Gen. Trần Văn Đôn (in charge of inspections)
- Foreign Minister: Lawyer Vương Văn Bắc
- Interior Minister: Bửu Viên
- Finance Minister: Lê Quang Trường
- Chief of Planning: Dr. Nguyễn Tiến Hưng
- Attorney General: Lawyer Ngô Khắc Tịnh
- Minister of Social Affairs: Professor Trần Văn Mãi
- Minister of Health: MP Tôn Thất Niệm
- Minister of Public Works and Traffic: Engineer Nguyễn Xuân Đức
- Minister of Culture: Professor Nguyễn Duy Xuân
- Minister of Information: Brigadier General Phan Hòa Hiệp
- Minister of the Prime Minister's Office: Nguyễn Long Châu
- Secretary of State: Lawyer Lê Trọng Quát, Professor Phạm Thái, Nguyễn Xuân Phong

And many other Ministers, Deputy Ministers, Advisors such as Judge Huỳnh Đức Bửu, Professor Nguyễn Thanh Liêm, Engineer Đoàn Minh Quan, Engineer Nguyền Hữu Tân, Nguyễn Quang Diệp.

However, just a week later, when the Battle of Xuân Lộc line was broken, on 21 April, President Thiệu announced his resignation, ceding power to Vice President Trần Văn Hương. The government was on the verge of collapsing and on 25 April, Prime Minister Cẩn and the majority of his cabinet submitted their resignations to the new president but were asked to stand for an additional two to three days until a new prime minister was available.

In the last hours of his ministry, he reported in an interview with journalist Hạnh Dương as follows:

"The Vietnam issue at that time was a joint game between the United States and the Soviet Union. They got involved and arranged everything. They forced us to surrender, to hand over the status quo. On 21 April 1975, President Nguyễn Văn Thiệu had to resign. According to the Constitution, he handed over the presidency to Vice President Trần Văn Hương. On 25 April 1975, I submitted my resignation as Prime Minister of the Republic of Vietnam, but President Trần Văn Hương asked me to stay and continue handling affairs until 28 April 1975 to wait for the swearing in of the new government."

...

"On the morning of 27 April 1975, I attended an urgent and closed meeting with President Trần Văn Hương at the Vice President's residence to discuss the fact that the United States and France were forcing the Saigon government to hand over South Vietnam to the communist regime. The Communists of North Vietnam demanded that the presidency should be handed over to General Dương Văn Minh, I told President Hương that if the President automatically hands over the presidency to General Minh, then thousands of generations of history will resent the President! If the National Assembly agrees to hand it over, the President will hand it over to General Minh and thus the President will avoid unconstitutional actions."'

...

"The session ended at 12 noon. I had just returned to the Prime Minister's Palace at 12:15 when Ambassador Martin of the United States called to tell me, "The night of 26 April 1975, North Vietnamese Communists firing rockets at the center of Saigon was only a warning. Now the North Vietnamese Communists have already deployed 20 divisions around Saigon and the South Vietnamese are required to hand over the Presidency to Mr. Dương Văn Minh, anyone else cannot be accepted, and must hand over before 12 in the late hours of 27 April 1975, otherwise the North Vietnamese would bombard Saigon on the ground. So please, Prime Minister, please help Senate President Trần Văn Lắm to convene an emergency bicameral session of the National Assembly."

...

"I instructed Radio Saigon and the television programs to keep playing heroic music and for a few minutes to read the order to summon the Bicameral National Assembly urgently. Thanks to that, on the night of 27 April 1975, there were enough valid quorums. That is, a total of 60 MPS of the Senate and 159 MPs of the House met to decide whether to agree or not to hand over power to General Dương Văn Minh as requested by the North Vietnamese Communists, if not, Saigon will be attacked on an equal footing. The bicameral National Assembly voted overwhelmingly to approve the motion and on the afternoon of 28 April 1975, President Hương handed over the position of President to former General Minh."

After President Hương resigned and handed over the presidency to General Dương Văn Minh, former Foreign Minister and Senator Vũ Văn Mẫu was invited to hold the position of prime minister. Former Prime Minister Nguyễn Bá Cẩn officially resigned from office. However, the situation of the Republic of Vietnam was still irreversible. Only 2 days later, General Dương Văn Minh was forced to declare his surrender to the Provisional Revolutionary Government of the Republic of South Vietnam. The regime of the Republic of Vietnam completely collapsed.

=== Life in exile ===
After submitting his resignation, he arranged for his wife and youngest daughter board the last Air France flight to Paris on 26 April. Two days later, he was brought over the Philippines by the US Embassy on a C-130 plane of the United States Air Force. On this flight, included two veteran politicians Hoàng Đức Nhã and Phan Quang Đán. From the Philippines, US authorities took him to California. After he arrived in Sacramento, his wife and youngest daughter were also approved by the US government to immigrate to the United States from Paris to reunite.

After settling in northern California, he initially opened a small gas station in the city of Mountain View. However, after only three months, the business had to stop because of capital loss. Then, he enrolled to study computing at the age of 46. In 1979, he graduated as a programmer and joined Standard Oil, then Chevron Texaco Corp., working in the computer department until retiring in 1998.

In retirement, he devoted time to social activities and human rights. In September 2003, he published his memoirs My Country. In May 2009, he submitted the dossier "Vietnam's continental shelf" to the United Nations, affirming Vietnam's sovereignty over the East Sea and the Hoàng Sa and Trường Sa archipelagoes.

He died at 4:30 am on 20 May 2009 at Regional Medical Center in San Jose, California.

== See also ==
- Politics of South Vietnam

Political offices
Preceded by Position established	Member of the House of Representatives of the Republic of Vietnam from Định Tường province 1967–1975	Succeeded by Position abolished
Preceded by Nguyễn Bá Lương	Speaker of the House of Representatives of the Republic of Vietnam; 1971–1975	Succeeded by Phạm Văn Út
Preceded by Trần Thiện Khiêm	Prime Minister of the Republic of Vietnam; 1975	Succeeded by Vũ Văn Mẫu
