= Kiều Mộng Thu =

Vietnamese politician (b. 1941)

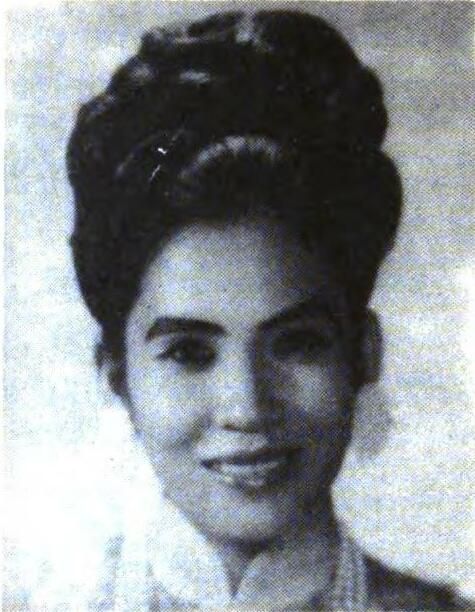
- Official portrait, 1968

Member of the House of Representatives of South Vietnam
- In office 31 October 1967 – 30 April 1975 Serving with: Nguyễn Ngọc Nghĩa (1967–1971); Võ Mạnh Đông (1967–1971); Nguyễn Lý Tưởng (1967–1971); Hà Thúc Ký (1971–1975)
- Preceded by: Position established (1967); Nguyễn Đại Bảng (1971)
- Succeeded by: Trần Ngọc Giao (1971); Nguyễn Phúc Vĩnh Tung (1971); Position abolished (1975)
- Constituency: Thừa Thiên province (1967–1971); Huế (1971–1975)

Personal details
- Born: Trương Ngọc Thu; 1941 (age 84–85) Long Xuyên, An Giang province, Cochinchina, French Indochina
- Party: Independent
- Spouse: Nguyễn Chức Sắc
- Children: 6
- Profession: Author; Journalist; Politician; Teacher
- Nickname: The Dragon

Kiều Mộng Thu (born 1941, real name: Trương Ngọc Thu) is a Vietnamese journalist, teacher, and an opposition politician well known during the existence of South Vietnam. During the Second Republic of the Republic of Vietnam, she was one of President Nguyễn Văn Thiệu's staunchest political critics and opponents. She was one of the few women elected to the lower house (House of Representatives) of the National Assembly in 1967, representing Thừa Thiên province and being reelected in 1971 this time representing the city of Huế.

== Biography ==
She was born in 1941 in Long Xuyên, An Giang province, Cochinchina, French Indochina.

=== Political career ===
During her tenure in the lower house of the National Assembly, she was a staunch opponent of the Vietnam War and advocated for the withdrawal of the US military from Vietnam. On 19 October 1970, she participated in a seminar criticizing and condemning the Thiệu regime; members ranging from President Thiệu, Vice President Nguyễn Cao Kỳ, and Prime Minister Trần Thiện Khiêm on their handling of the economy and caving into the US demands on a new currency exchange law. Regarding the currency exchange law, she stated, We cannot sit idle and allow the people's miserable lives to continue.

=== Fall of Saigon ===
Not much is known about her status after the Fall of Saigon; however, it was reported that she joined the new regime of the Provisional Revolutionary Government of the Republic of South Vietnam and served as a member of the Ho Chi Minh City People's Council. Some years later, Thu found herself amongst a wave of Vietnamese boat people and was a refugee in Hong Kong. During her time there, she published a poem describing the plight of Vietnamese refugees seeking freedom and help, titled Please Do Not Abandon Us:

"Freedom… Freedom!"
"Those simple sweet words"
"For us, poor people escaping the homeland"
"Sailing across oceans"
"Trying to find happiness"
"That’s all we need"

"People of the world, we looking to you"
"Please help us to be free"
"Please let the children"
"No longer cry"
"For their forgotten fates"
"Please, the free world"
"Open your arms"
"To rescue us"
"Poor people without a country."

== Works ==
- Cảnh Mimosa Ngày Củ (Mimosa Petal of old days)
- Hai Khung Trời (Two Skies)
- Lá Đỏ Trên Mười Đầu Ngón Tay (Leaves fall on finger tips)
- Khung Trời Quê Hương (Nation's Sky)
- Mùa Thu Cuối Cùng (Last Fall)
- Dưới Rặng Bằng Lăng (Under Bằng Lăng Tree)
- Mau Hoa Phương (Flamboyant Flower Color)

Political offices
Preceded by Position established	Member of the House of Representatives of the Republic of Vietnam from Thừa Thiên province 1967–1971	Succeeded by: Trần Ngọc Giao; Nguyễn Phúc Vĩnh Tung
Preceded by Nguyễn Đại Bảng	Member of the House of Representatives of the Republic of Vietnam from Huế; 1971–1975	Succeeded by Position abolished
