= Phạm Văn Út =

South Vietnamese military officer and politician (1925–2002)

3rd Speaker of the House of Representatives of South Vietnam
- In office 4 April 1975 – 30 April 1975
- Preceded by: Nguyễn Bá Cẩn
- Succeeded by: Position abolished

Member of the House of Representatives of South Vietnam
- In office 31 October 1971 – 30 April 1975 Serving with: Hoàng Thông; Hồ Văn Xuân; Son Thị
- Preceded by: Trần Duy Từ; Nguyễn Ðạt Dàn; Tangba Xuân
- Succeeded by: Position abolished
- Constituency: Ba Xuyên Province

Personal details
- Born: 11 November 1925 Sa Đéc, Cochinchina, French Indochina
- Died: 20 April 2002 (aged 76) Loveland, Colorado, U.S.
- Resting place: Sa Đéc, Vietnam
- Party: Republican
- Other political affiliations: National Social Democratic Front (Big tent affiliation)
- Spouse: Thạch Thị Thu Thuỷ m. July 10, 1965
- Children: 7(3 sons; 4 daughters)
- Education: Thủ Đức Military Academy

Military service
- Allegiance: Republic of Vietnam
- Branch/service: Vietnamese National Army; Army of the Republic of Vietnam
- Rank: Colonel (Đại Tá)

Phạm Văn Út (11 November 1925 – 20 April 2002) was a South Vietnamese military officer and politician who served as the last Speaker of the House of Representatives of South Vietnam in April 1975 until the collapse of South Vietnam on 30 April 1975. He was elected as a member of the Lower House in the 1971 South Vietnamese parliamentary election. Prior to entering politics, he served as a colonel in the Army of the Republic of Vietnam.

== Biography ==
He was born on 11 November 1925 to Phạm Văn So and Hồ Thị Định in Sa Đéc, Cochinchina, French Indochina. Prior to becoming a military officer, He attended Trường Võ Bị Quốc Gia Huế/Dalat. Upon completion of his studies and training he began serving in the Vietnamese National Army, before being renamed as the Army of the Republic of Vietnam in 1955. During his military career he was stationed at Sóc Trăng Airfield.

=== Political career ===
After retiring from the military, he joined politics which he would go on to serve as governor of three provinces and being elected in the 1971 South Vietnamese parliamentary election as a member of the House of Representatives (Lower House) in the National Assembly, representing Ba Xuyên Province. In April 1975 after House Speaker Nguyễn Bá Cẩn resigned from his post to become prime minister at the behest of President Nguyễn Văn Thiệu, Út was elected as House Speaker. During his tenure in the House of Representatives, he was leader of the Republican bloc, which comprised a group of deputies who were pro-government, favoring President Thiệu's regime. On 27 April 1975, when members of National Assembly convened to vote to transfer the presidency from President Trần Văn Hương to General Dương Văn Minh, he was the sole deputy who voted in opposition to the proposal.

=== Life in exile ===
On 29 April 1975, the day before the collapse and surrender of South Vietnam, Út and his family fled from the advancing forces of the National Liberation Front of South Vietnam and PAVN in which they were transported to an American ship in the South China Sea by helicopter. Afterward they were dropped off in the Philippines, where he began trying to make numerous contacts in the US that would help him and his family migrate to the US. Soon after, they were admitted to entry into the US as refugees after a Lutheran Church in Greeley, Colorado sponsored Út and his family. He first settled in Greeley, Colorado in 1975 then relocated to Loveland, Colorado on 19 May 1979 where he would live for the remainder of his life. He was employed at Hewlett-Packard for 15 years, retiring in 1992. He was a member of the Benevolent Association of Nationalist Vietnamese in Colorado and the Association of Elderly Vietnamese in Colorado.

=== Personal life ===
His second wife is Thach Thi Thu Thuy with whom he had six children (two sons and four daughters). He was previously married and adopted one son. His religious affiliation was Buddhism. He enjoyed fishing, riding his bike, traveling and spending time with friends and family.

He died on 20 April 2002 in Loveland, Colorado. He was cremated and his ashes sent to his family burial in Sa Đéc, Vietnam.

Political offices
Preceded by Trần Duy Từ; Nguyễn Ðạt Dàn; Tangba Xuân	Member of the House of Representatives of the Republic of Vietnam from Ba Xuyên Province; 1971–1975	Succeeded by Position abolished
Preceded by Nguyễn Bá Cẩn	Speaker of the House of Representatives of the Republic of Vietnam; 1975	Succeeded by Position abolished
