= 1963 South Vietnamese parliamentary election =

Parliamentary elections were held in South Vietnam on 27 September 1963. All but three of the 123 seats in the National Assembly were won by President Ngo Dinh Diem's regime. Three seats were won by the opposition Vietnamese Democratic Socialist Party and the Đại Việt Progressive Party. As the elections took place during the Buddhist crisis, the government allowed elements of the opposition to stand during the elections as one of the concessions to Buddhist protest leaders. However, due to the 1963 South Vietnamese coup, the National Assembly was not able to convene for its first inaugural session and was forced to dissolve by the military.

== Results ==
Party	Seats	+/–
National Revolutionary Movement	66	–12
Citizens' Assembly	18	New
Workers' Party	10	New
Movement to Win and Preserve Freedom	7	New
Vietnamese Democratic Socialist Party	2	–1
Đại Việt Progressive Party	1	New
Pro-government independents	19	–13
Total	123	0
Source: Keesing's Research Review
