= Trương Vĩnh Lễ =

President of the National Assembly of the Republic of Vietnam from 1959 to 1963

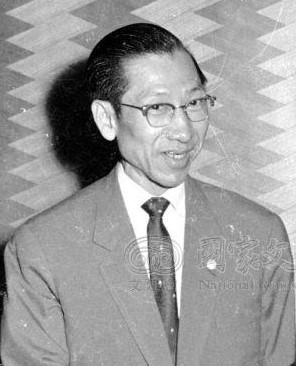
- Lễ in 1962

2nd President of the National Assembly of the Republic of Vietnam
- In office 1959 – 2 November 1963
- Preceded by: Trần Văn Lắm
- Succeeded by: Position abolished

Member of the National Assembly of the Republic of Vietnam
- In office 11 December 1956 – 2 November 1963
- Preceded by: Position established
- Succeeded by: Position abolished
- Constituency: Gia Định province District 3

Personal details
- Born: 13 May 1914 Sóc Trăng, Cochinchina, French Indochina
- Died: 23 October 2011 (aged 97) Paris, France
- Party: Independent (since 1963)
- Other political affiliations: Cần Lao (until 1963)
- Children: 7
- Relatives: Pétrus Ký (great-grandfather); Trương Vĩnh Tống (granduncle)

Trương Vĩnh Lễ (13 May 1914 – 23 October 2011) was a South Vietnamese politician who served as the second President of the National Assembly of the Republic of Vietnam during the First Republic from 1959 until the 1963 coup which lead to the overthrow and assassination of South Vietnam's President Ngô Đình Diệm. After Diệm's overthrow, he had his assets frozen by the new government of General Dương Văn Minh.

== Biography ==
He was born on 13 May 1914 in Sóc Trăng, Cochinchina, French Indochina. He comes from a Catholic family of Vietnamese scholars with careers in academia, journalism, and publishing. He is also the great-grandson of a known Vietnamese scholar Trương Vĩnh Ký, commonly known as Pétrus Ký. He graduated from university with degrees in politics, economics, and business management.

=== Career ===
Under the First Republic, he served as a member of the National Assembly representing District 3 of Gia Định province as a member of the majority bloc and was affiliated with the Citizen's Assembly group. He initially filed to run in the 1971 South Vietnamese presidential election with Vice President Nguyễn Cao Kỳ but later withdrew.
