= Nguyễn Bá Lương =

South Vietnamese politician (1902–1992)

- Lương in 1970

1st Speaker of the House of Representatives of South Vietnam
- In office 17 January 1968 – 3 December 1971; Acting: November 1967 – 17 January 1968
- Preceded by: Position established
- Succeeded by: Nguyễn Bá Cẩn

Member of the House of Representatives of South Vietnam
- In office 31 October 1967 – 30 April 1975
- Preceded by: Position established
- Succeeded by: Position abolished
- Constituency: Phước Long province

Personal details
- Born: 21 January 1902 Cao Lãnh, Cochinchina, French Indochina
- Died: 11 May 1992 (aged 90) Harris County, Texas, U.S.
- Party: Independent
- Other political affiliations: National Social Democratic Front (Big tent affiliation)
- Children: 5
- Education: Institut industriel du Nord (BE)
- Profession: Engineer; Politician; Union leader

Nguyễn Bá Lương (21 January 1902 – 11 May 1992) was a South Vietnamese engineer and politician who served as a member of the House of Representatives of the Republic of Vietnam from late October 1967 until the collapse and surrender of South Vietnam on 30 April 1975. He also served as the inaugural Speaker of the House of Representatives of the Republic of Vietnam from 1967 to 1971.

== Biography ==
=== Early life and career ===
He was born on 21 January 1902 in Cao Lãnh, Cochinchina, French Indochina. He earned his college degree overseas in France, where he attended the Institut industriel du Nord, earning a bachelor's degree in engineering. Prior to entering politics, he work for the postal service of French Cochinchina, serving as the controller at P.T.T. Saigon Central Post Office.

=== Political career ===
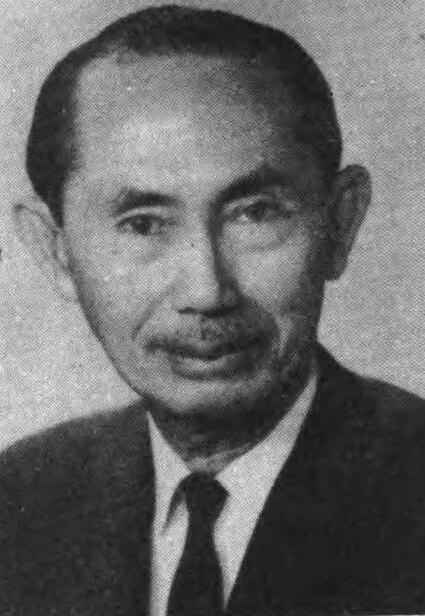
Lương's official portrait as a member of the National Assembly, 1968

He first started off his political career by serving on the Phước Long Provincial Council and mayor of Phước Long province. He was first elected to the House of Representatives (Lower House) in the 1967 South Vietnamese parliamentary election, representing Phước Long province. He assumed office on 31 October 1967.

In January 1968 after being elected as the Speaker of the House of Representatives, in his first speech to the Lower House, Luong stressed the election of the House of Representatives was a landmark in the emergence of the Second Republic of Vietnam. He added that the Lower House should cooperate closely with the Upper House (Senate) to regulate the executive and judicial branches of government.

On 7 April 1968, Luong convened a session in the Lower House to discuss details of negotiations the US plan to address with Democratic Republic of Vietnam in the 1968 bilateral talks, which would eventually lead to the 1973 Paris Peace Accords. In that session, he issued a stark warning to the US saying, "Any decision relating to the future of the Republic of Vietnam and not approved by the elected government and the National Assembly of the Republic of Vietnam will be considered as void and a betrayal of the Vietnamese people."

On 28 September 1968, Speaker Lương opposed UN Secretary General U Thant's decision to get the United Nations General Assembly to order the US to stop the bombing of North Vietnam. Talking with the press, regarding Thant's proposal, Speaker Lương expressed, "Mr. Thant has shown that he is not impartial." He further mentions UN Secretary General U Thant of being biased and favoring the North Vietnamese communists. Speaker Lương emphasized that the South Vietnamese are fighting in self-defense in a war waged by the North Vietnamese communists. Therefore, Speaker Lương states, "why not tell the North Vietnamese to withdraw their troops." According to Speaker Lương the goal of bombing North Vietnam is to stop the infiltration of communist troops and weapons into the South.

After President Nguyễn Văn Thiệu's speech to the joint session of the National Assembly of the Republic of Vietnam on 2 November 1968, Speaker Lương and along with other lawmakers marched to the Independence Palace demanding Thiệus' and Vice President Nguyễn Cao Kỳ's responses on what the future of South Vietnam would be like if the US were to abandon them.

On 8 April 1969, at the first meeting session of the 1969-1970 congress of the Lower House, at the start of the session Speaker Lương called for the unity of all political parties because he believed being united will help build an efficient government. He further stressed that it is the responsibility of all of the deputies to unite political ideas and the populace to help combat against the Communists in the war.

In 1969 during a trip to the Republic of Korea Speaker Lương was bestowed the Order of Diplomatic Service Merit of the Republic of Korea by South Korean President Park Chung Hee.

In early 1970, He granted permission for the arrest of fellow Deputy Trần Ngọc Châu who has been accused by President Thiệu of having connections to the Viet Cong and helping them maintain territory within South Vietnam. President Thiệu furthering declaring that Deputy Trần Ngọc Châu posed a threat to the country's national defense.

On 23 April 1970, Luong sent a letter to the President of the Cambodian National Assembly, the acting Cambodian Chief of State Cheng Heng, and the Cambodian Prime Minister Lon Nol to take appropriate measures to protect the lives and properties of Vietnamese nationals living in Cambodia. Luong and other members of the Lower House expressed, "More than anyone else, they are upset by the news that the lives and properties of a large number of Vietnamese nationals have suffered heavy losses."

On 30 May 1970, Lương and other members of South Vietnam's leadership attended the funeral of the late Chief of State Phan Khắc Sửu in Saigon. He expressed deep sorrow for Sửu's passing and praised Sửu as a great revolutionary.

On 14 January 1971, Speaker Lương led a delegation of ten members of the National Assembly to Taipei for a five-day visit. Once arriving at the airport Speaker Lương express to reporters that the relationship between the Republic of China and the Republic of Vietnam is close, and the two nations have many similarities in culture and customs. He hopes that this visit to China will further promote the friendship and cooperation between the two countries.

=== Life in exile ===
Once South Vietnam fell on 30 April 1975, Lương and his family relocated to the United States as refugees. He died on 11 May 1992 in Harris County, Texas, US.

=== Personal life ===
He was married and had five children. He was a practicing Buddhist who followed aspects of Taoism and Confucianism.

== Honour ==
=== Foreign honours ===
- South Korea: Grand Cross of the Order of Diplomatic Service Merit

Political offices
Preceded by Position established	Speaker of the House of Representatives of the Republic of Vietnam; 1967–1971	Succeeded by Nguyễn Bá Cẩn
Preceded by Position established	Member of the House of Representatives of the Republic of Vietnam from Phước Long province 1967–1975	Succeeded by Position abolished
