= 1961 South Vietnamese presidential election =

- 9 April 1961
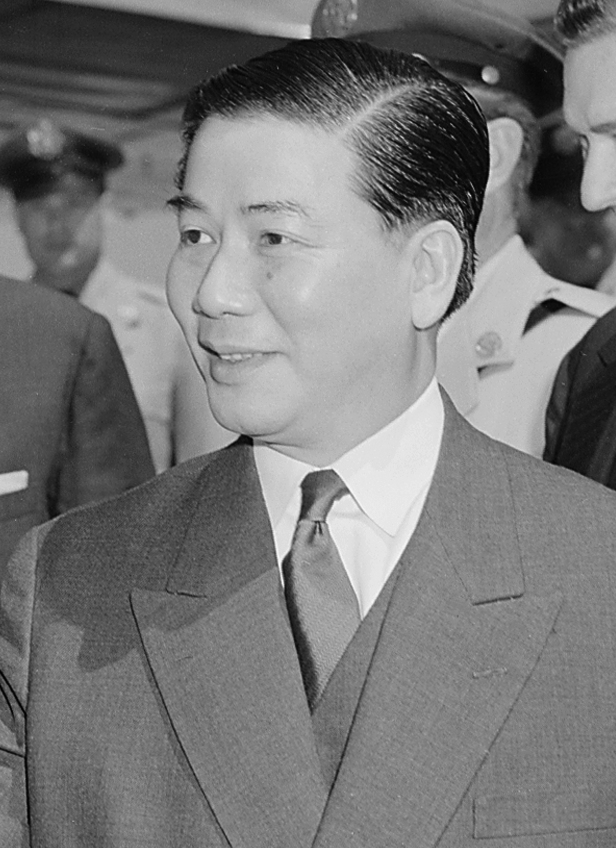

Nominee	Ngô Đình Diệm	Nguyễn Đình Quát
Party	PLRP
Percentage	89%	7%
Elected President
Ngô Đình Diệm
PLRP

Presidential elections were held in South Vietnam on 9 April 1961. The result was a victory for Ngô Đình Diệm, who received 89% of the vote.

== Results ==
Candidate	Party	Votes	%
Ngô Đình Diệm	Personalist Labor Revolutionary Party		89
Nguyễn Đình Quát			7
Hồ Nhựt Tân			4
Total			
Source: Nohlen et al.
