= Hà Thúc Ký =

South Vietnamese politician (1919–2008)

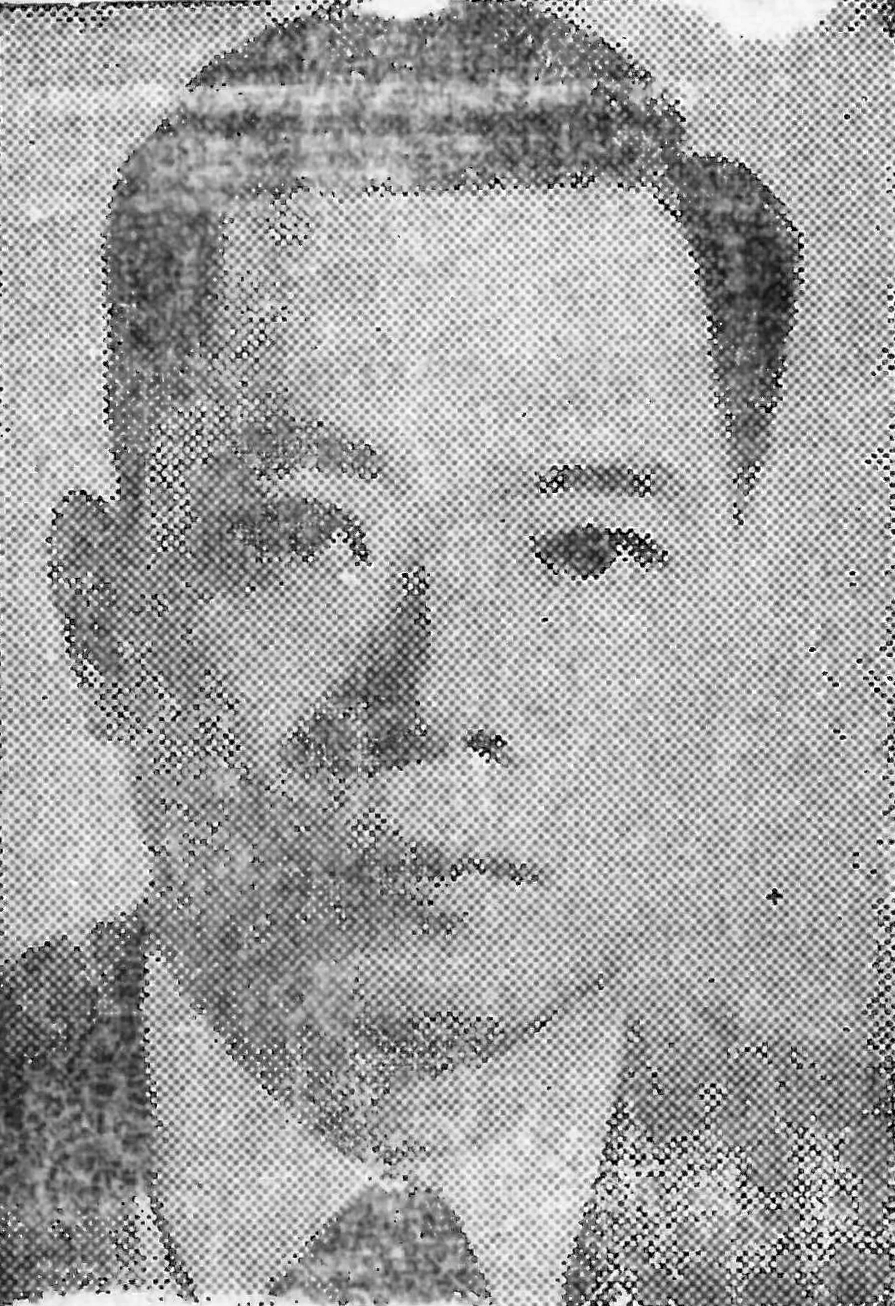
- Ký in 1967

Member of the House of Representatives of South Vietnam
- In office 31 October 1967 – 30 April 1975 Serving with: Nguyễn Đại Bảng (1967–1971); Kiều Mộng Thu (1971–1975)
- Preceded by: Position established
- Succeeded by: Position abolished
- Constituency: Huế

Minister of Internal Affairs of South Vietnam
- In office 8 February 1964 – 4 April 1964
- Prime Minister: Nguyễn Khánh
- Preceded by: Tôn Thất Đính
- Succeeded by: Lâm Văn Phát

Personal details
- Born: 1 January 1919 Huế, Annam, French Indochina
- Died: 16 October 2008 (aged 89) Silver Spring, Maryland, U.S.
- Party: Đại Việt Revolutionary Party (since 1946)
- Other political affiliations: Nationalist Party of Greater Vietnam (until 1965)
- Spouse: Tôn Nữ Oanh
- Children: 7 (4 sons; 3 daughters)
- Parent(s): Hà Thúc Huyên (father); Tôn Nữ Thị Hiệp (mother)
- Education: University of Indochina (BSAg)

Hà Thúc Ký (1 January 1919 – 16 October 2008) was a South Vietnamese opposition politician. During the presidency of Ngô Đình Diệm he was sentenced in absentia to 20 years in prison and arrested in October 1958, however, after the coup and assassination of Diệm in 1963, he was released by the rebel forces. He ran for president in the 1967 South Vietnamese presidential election, under the Đại Việt Revolutionary Party, a branch of the Nationalist Party of Greater Vietnam and was unsuccessful. In 1974, after President Nguyễn Văn Thiệu amended the "Regulations of the Political Party" into law, Ký filed an application at the Supreme Court to sue President Thiệu, declaring that the law was unconstitutional.

== Early life ==
He was born in Huế, Annam, French Indochina and was the youngest of eight children. After graduating from high school, he attended the University of Hanoi where he earned a BS in engineering. He relocated to Cà Mau where he worked as an engineer. In 1945, the Japanese coup d'état in French Indochina took place, Ký joined the Nationalist Party of Greater Vietnam.

== Political career ==
He joined the Dai Viet in 1946. Prior to that he was a member of the 9th Street Front located in Laos. The Dai Viet fought both against the French and against the Viet Minh.

Since joining the Nationalist Party of Greater Vietnam, Ký participated in many anti-communist movements. On 12 December 1963 he was invited by General Dương Văn Minh, the Chairman of the Military Revolutionary Council to join Humanitarian Council, consisting of 40 people and this council was officially launched on 9 January 1964. On the dawn of 30 January 1964 General Nguyễn Khánh launched a coup against Minh, ousting Minh and his government from power. After Khánh finally stabilize power he invited Ký to serve as Minister of Internal Affairs on 8 February 1964, but Ký only held the position for 1 month and 21 days; resigning after having some disagreements with Khánh. In late 1964 he formed Tan Dai Viet. By 1969 it had developed into the Progressive Nationalist Movement.

Ký was an unsuccessful candidate for president in the 1967 South Vietnamese presidential election. After losing his bid for president, he won a house seat in the National Assembly. In May 1965, he published the 9-point Manifesto, advocating against the Communists, demanding the realization of national unity, demanding reforms in economy, politics, culture, education, society, etc. In 1969, Ký led a delegation of all South Vietnamese political groups abroad to meet Pope Paul VI as well as other world leaders to recognize and support South Vietnam in its fight against invading Communists. In 1974, he sued President Thiệu for signing a law regulating political parties.

== Life in exile ==
On 30 April 1975 when South Vietnam fell to the advancing Communist North Vietnamese and Viet Cong forces, Ký and his family fled the Communists by boat, resettling in the United States as political refugees. During his life in exile, he continued to fight for freedom, democracy and human rights for Vietnam and opposing the communist regime.

He died on 16 October 2008 at 12:10 pm at Holy Cross Hospital, in Silver Spring, Maryland, US.

Political offices
Preceded by Tôn Thất Đính	Minister of Internal Affairs of the Republic of Vietnam; 1964	Succeeded by Lâm Văn Phát
Preceded by Position established	Member of the House of Representatives of the Republic of Vietnam from Huế; 1967–1975	Succeeded by Position abolished
