= 1971 South Vietnamese presidential election =

← 1967	2 October 1971
- Registered: 7,192,660
- Turnout: 87.97%
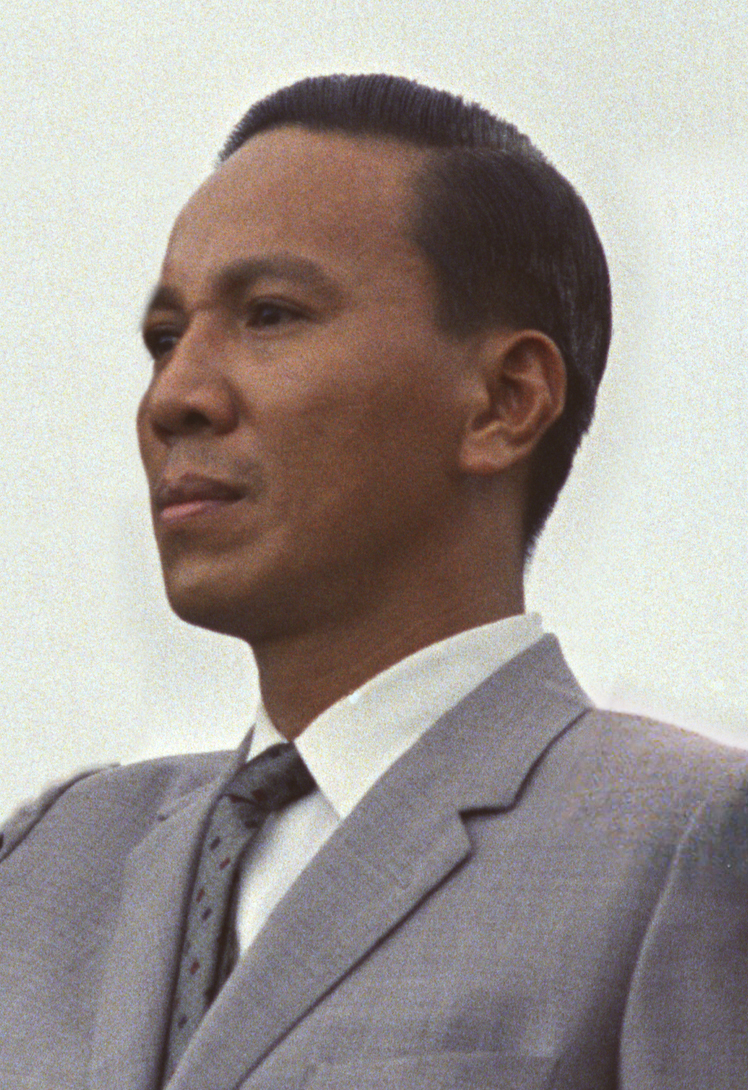
Nominee	Nguyễn Văn Thiệu
Party	NSDF
Running mate	Trần Văn Hương
Popular vote	5,971,114
Percentage	100%
President before election
Nguyễn Văn Thiệu
NSDF
Elected President
Nguyễn Văn Thiệu
NSDF

Presidential elections were held in South Vietnam on 2 October 1971. After the opposition candidates Dương Văn Minh and Nguyễn Cao Kỳ withdrew their candidacies (most opposition figures had already been banned from the ballot), incumbent President Nguyễn Văn Thiệu was the only candidate, receiving 100% of the vote. Thiệu's victory in this election officially marked his second term in office. They were the last presidential elections held in South Vietnam.

== Results ==
Candidate	Votes	%
Nguyễn Văn Thiệu	5,971,114	100.00
Total	5,971,114	100.00
Valid votes	5,971,114	94.37
Invalid/blank votes	356,517	5.63
Total votes	6,327,631	100.00
Registered voters/turnout	7,192,660	87.97
Source: Nohlen et al.
