= Vương Văn Bắc =

Last Minister of Foreign Affairs of South Vietnam

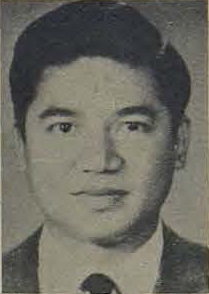
- Bắc in 1968

Minister of Foreign Affairs of South Vietnam
- In office 24 July 1973 – 28 April 1975
- Prime Minister: Trần Thiện Khiêm; Nguyễn Bá Cẩn
- Preceded by: Trần Văn Lắm; Nguyễn Phú Đức (Acting)
- Succeeded by: Position abolished

Personal details
- Born: 20 September 1927 Bac Ninh, Tonkin, French Indochina
- Died: 20 June 2011 (aged 83) Paris, France
- Party: National Social Democratic Front
- Children: 4
- Education: University of Indochina; Michigan State University; Vanderbilt University

Vương Văn Bắc (20 September 1927 – 20 June 2011) was a South Vietnamese lawyer and politician who served as the last Minister of Foreign Affairs of South Vietnam under the premiership of Prime Ministers Trần Thiện Khiêm and Nguyễn Bá Cẩn. He was in charge of seeking last minute aid for South Vietnam in the fight against the invading Communist North Vietnamese and the National Liberation Front of South Vietnam, commonly known the Viet Cong, which ultimately failed and led to the collapse of South Vietnam.

== Early life ==
He was born on 20 September 1927 in Bac Ninh, Tonkin, French Indochina. He was a student at Chu Văn An High School in Hanoi after graduating, he entered Hanoi University of Law. When he graduated from Law School with distinction, he apprenticed with lawyer Vũ Quốc Thúc, then immigrated to the South.

In 1964, he worked as a Professor of Political Science at the Institute of Da Lat University and the National Academy of Public Administration (1964-1974).

== Career and Foreign Minister ==
He practiced law at the Saigon Superior Court, and was a member of the Republic of Vietnam delegation at the Paris Peace Talks to negotiate between the North and the South during the Vietnam War.

He was appointed Deputy Minister of National Education and then Ambassador of the Republic of Vietnam to the UK in 1972.

In 1973, he succeeded Trần Văn Lắm as Foreign Minister of South Vietnam. In the beginning of 1974, China launched an attack in the Paracel Islands, attacking the Navy of the Republic of Vietnam on January 19th. He promoted the drafting of documents declaring the sovereignty of the Republic of Vietnam in 1974 on the Spratly and Paracel islands", "Declaration of the Ministry of Foreign Affairs of the Republic of Vietnam on the Chinese invasion of Hoàng Sa Island in 1974", and "White Letter of the Republic of Vietnam". In early 1975 he condemned the appropriation in front of an international forum. Diplomatic missions in Saigon were summoned to the Ministry to hear him determine Vietnam's sovereignty over the Paracel Islands as follows:

"Faced with such gross violations, the Government and People of the Republic of Vietnam were very indignant and determined to not tolerate them. The fact that the Hoàng Sa and Trường Sa archipelagoes are inseparable elements of the territory of the Republic of Vietnam is an obvious and indisputable fact, based on geographical, historical legal data, and international law."

When the attacks from the North increased, the South suffered from a decline of support and aid from the U.S. President Nguyễn Văn Thiệu sent Bắc to Saudi Arabia to seek to borrow a sum of money from King Khalid to pay for the war. When Khalid tardied, he immediately flew to Washington D.C. to mobilize loans from the United States but ultimately failed to achieve the goal. He submitted his resignation on April 25, 1975, and officially resigned three days later when the new government of General Dương Văn Minh was sworn in.

== Life in exile ==
After the Fall of Saigon, he immigrated to France as a political refugee.

After settling in France, Bắc worked for a prestigious international law office in Paris (one of the seven famous law complexes in the United States). He was well praised for his ability to constantly keeping up with the changes of laws, case laws, and doctrines. He worked tirelessly and was highly respected for practicing law into his late years. He officially retired at age 80.

He died in Paris on June 20, 2011, three months shy of his 84th birthday.

== Personal life ==
He was married and had four children. He was a follower of Buddhism.

== Honours and awards ==
- South Vietnam :
  - Chuong My Medal, First Class
  - Economic Service Medal, First Class
  - Public Works, Communication and Transportation Service Medal, First Class
  - Psychological Warfare Medal, First Class

Political offices
Preceded by Trần Văn Lắm	Minister Foreign Affairs of the Republic of Vietnam; 1973-1975	Succeeded by Position abolished
