= 1967 South Vietnamese Senate election =

Senate elections were held in South Vietnam (Republic of Vietnam) on 3 September 1967, alongside presidential elections, following the promulgation of a new constitution on 1 April. The lower house elections took place on October 22. The election was contested by a total of 48 lists, of which six were elected (each voter had six votes) and received 10 seats each. Voter turnout was reported to be 84%.

== Results ==
Party	Votes	%	Seats
Nong-Cong-Binh List	980,474	4.48	10
Cong-Ich va Cong-Binh Xa-Hoi List	631,616	2.89	10
Dai-Doan-Ket List	600,720	2.74	10
Troi-Viet List	569,975	2.60	10
Doan-Ket de tien-bo List	553,720	2.53	10
Bong-Lua List	553,632	2.53	10
42 other lists	17,994,465	82.22	0
Total	21,884,602	100.00	60
Valid votes	4,690,688	95.67	
Invalid/blank votes	212,060	4.33	
Total votes	4,902,748	100.00	
Registered voters/turnout	5,853,384	83.76	
Source: Nohlen et al., IPU
