= 1967 South Vietnamese presidential election =

- 3 September 1967
- Registered: 5,853,251
- Turnout: 83.17%
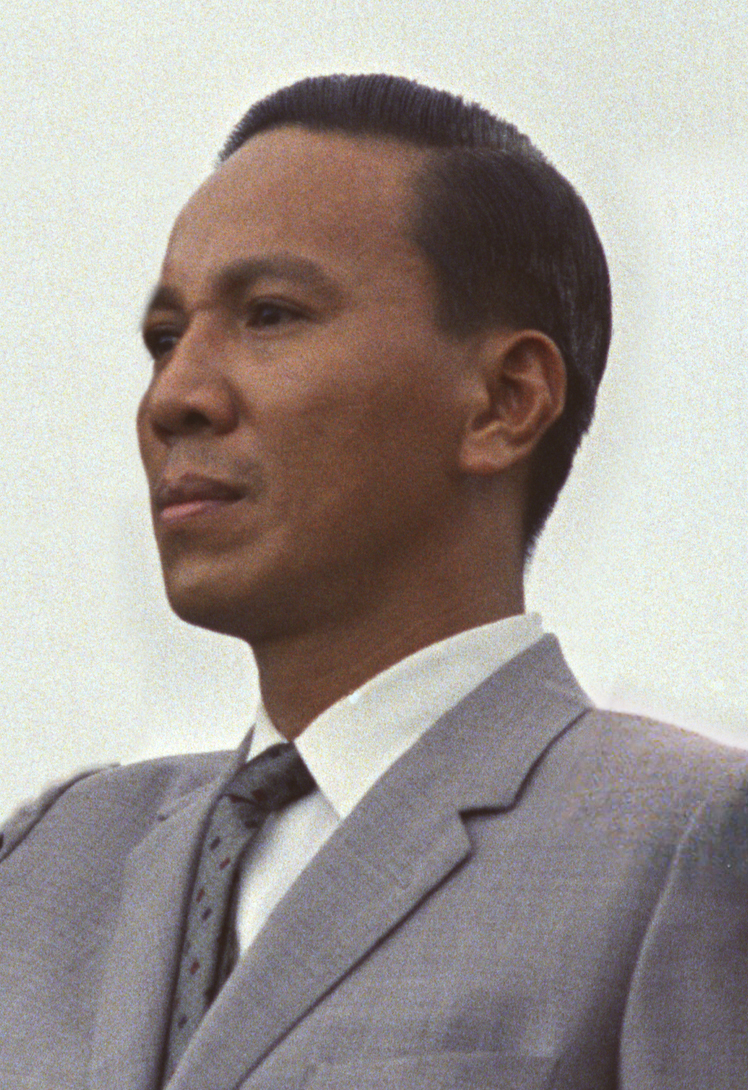

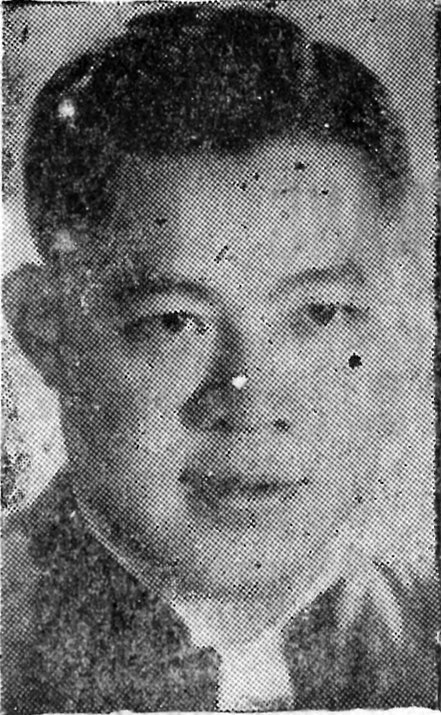

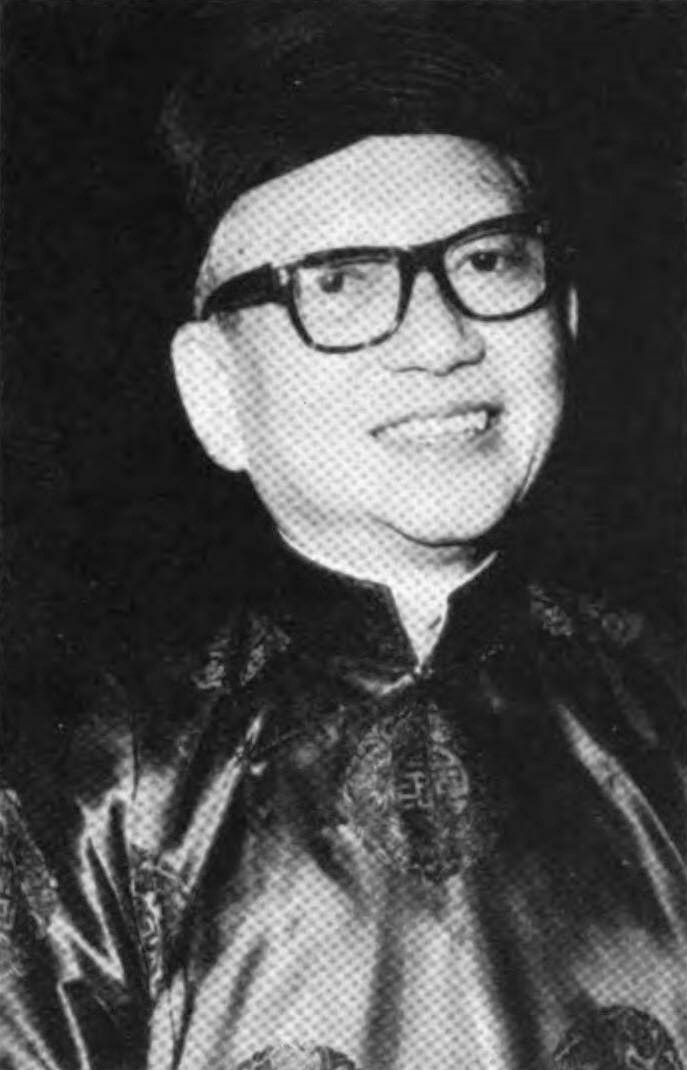

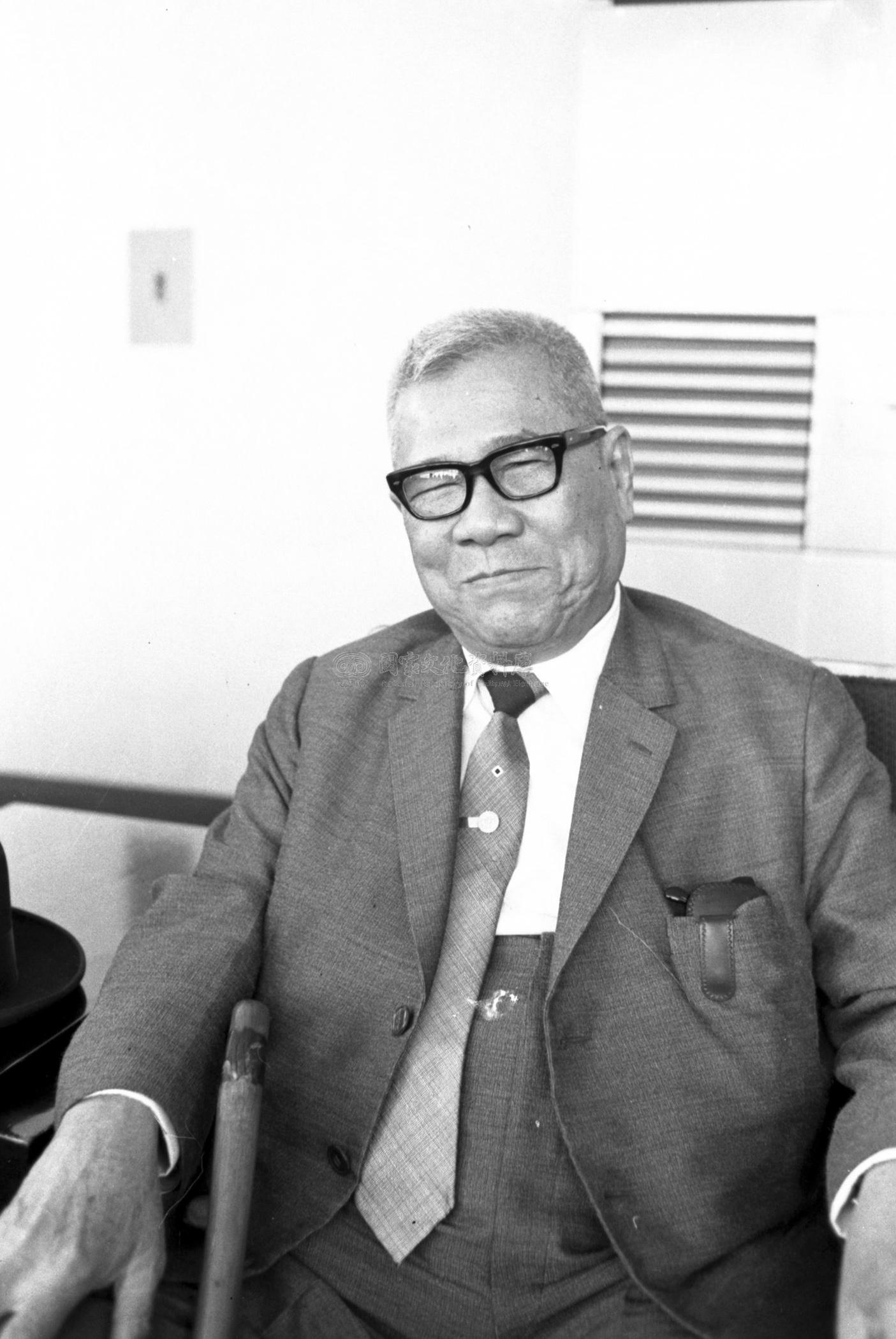

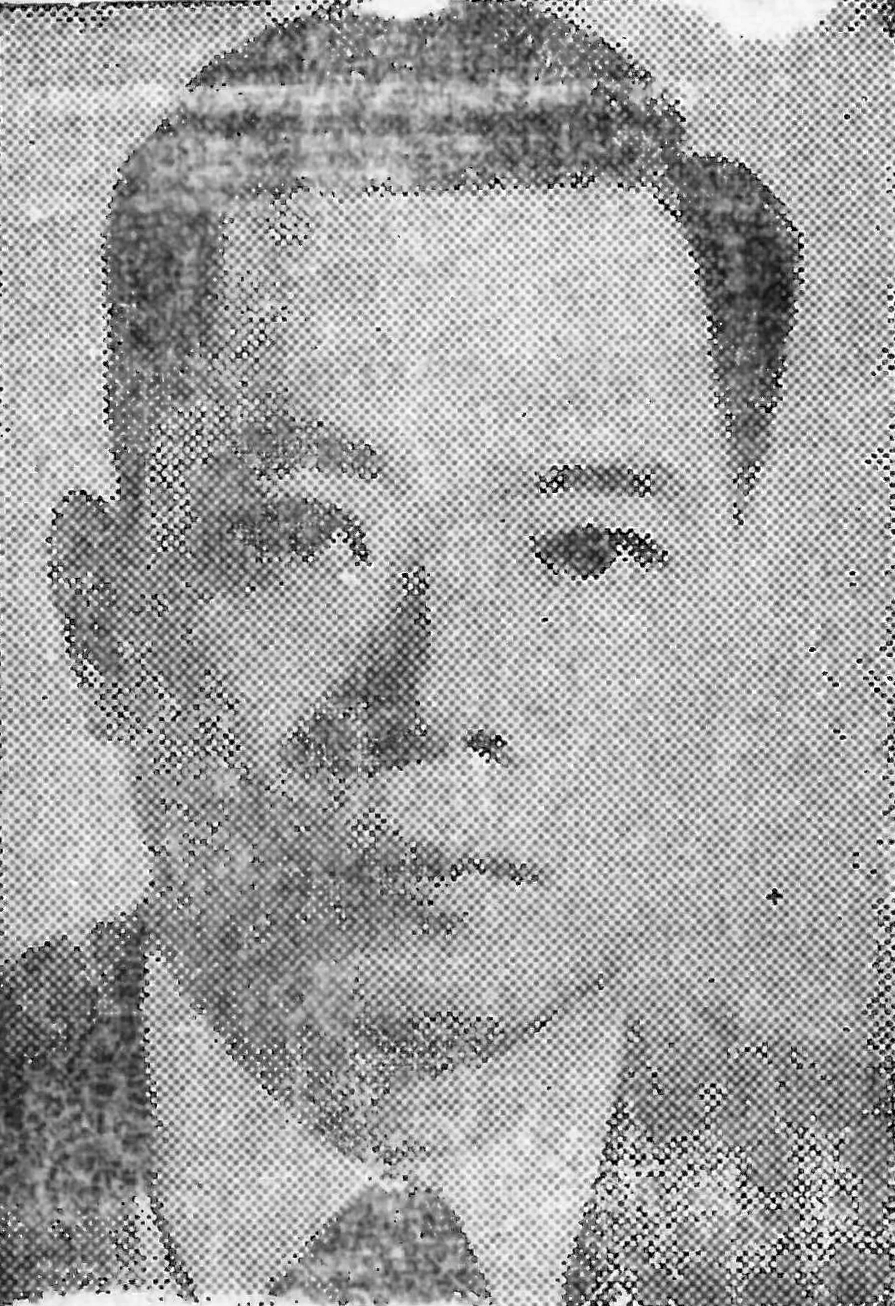
Nominee	Nguyễn Văn Thiệu	Trương Đình Dzu	Phan Khắc Sửu
Party	Democratic Progressive	The White Dove	Democratic Socialist
Running mate	Nguyễn Cao Kỳ	Trần Văn Chiêu	Phan Quang Đán
Popular vote	1,649,561	817,120	513,374
Percentage	34.83%	17.26%	10.84%
Nominee	Trần Văn Hương	Hà Thúc Ký	Nguyễn Đình Quát
Party	Independent	Đại Việt Revolutionary Party	The Buffalo
Running mate	Mai Thọ Truyền	Nguyễn Văn Đình	Trần Cửu Chấn
Popular vote	474,100	349,473	291,718
Percentage	10.01%	7.38%	6.16%
Elected President
Nguyễn Văn Thiệu
Democratic Progressive

Presidential elections were held in South Vietnam on 3 September 1967, following the promulgation of a new constitution on 1 April. The result was a victory for Nguyễn Văn Thiệu, who received 35% of the vote. Voter turnout was 83%. The elections are widely considered to have been fraudulent. Senate elections were held in South Vietnam on 3 September 1967, alongside presidential elections. The lower house elections took place on October 22.

== Background ==
The military junta chaired by Nguyễn Cao Kỳ intended to endorse only one candidate for the presidency. Kỳ intended to run, but at the last minute changed his mind and backed Thiệu, a move he later called "the biggest mistake of my life." Thiệu nominated Kỳ as his running mate. American policymakers heard rumors that the generals had agreed to subvert the constitution, and The New York Times revealed the formation of a secret military committee that would control the government after the elections.

During the negotiations within the military, Kỳ had agreed to stand aside in exchange for behind-the-scenes power through a military committee that would shape policy and control the civilian arm of the government. Kỳ flatly denied these reports to Ambassador Ellsworth Bunker, and the American embassy notified Washington that The New York Times story was baseless. However, the story was later vindicated, as intelligence sources obtained the charter that told of the functions of the secret Supreme Military Committee (SMC). Walt Rostow briefed President Lyndon B. Johnson and concluded that the SMC was "in effect, a scheme for 'guided democracy' in which a half dozen generals would decide finally what was good and bad for the country."

== Campaign ==
The campaign was overshadowed by American media criticism of Kỳ and Thiệu's unfair electoral practices. All the candidates were scheduled to attend a rally at Quảng Trị City in the far north of the country on 6 August. Owing to the security situation and the possibility of communist attacks, the politicians were transported to joint campaign events by the military, rather than being free to go to separate events as their strategy dictated. However, the Quảng Trị event had to be cancelled after the candidates' plane landed 23 km away at an air base in Đông Hà.

Believing that the mishap was a deliberate attempt to make them look chaotic and disorganized (Thiệu and Kỳ had decided not to attend rallies) the candidates boycotted the event and flew back to Saigon. There they denounced the government bitterly. The leading opposition candidate, Trần Văn Hương, claimed that Thiệu and Kỳ "purposefully arranged the trip to humiliate us and make clowns out of us." As air force chief, Kỳ had previously stranded opposition politicians on a trip to the Central Highlands. Kỳ and Thiệu maintained that no malice was involved, but their opponents did not believe it. None of the candidates made good on their threat to withdraw, but their strident attacks over the alleged dirty tricks dominated the media coverage of the election for a period.

The adverse publicity embarrassed Washington; instead of hearing reports about progress and good governance in South Vietnam, most reports focused on corruption and fraud. The heavy and negative coverage of the election provoked angry debate in Congress, criticising Kỳ's junta and Johnson's policies. Such sentiment came from both houses and political parties. On 10 August 57 members of the United States House of Representatives signed a statement condemning Kỳ's electoral malpractices and threatening a review of U.S. policy in Vietnam.

Kỳ and Thiệu were reluctant to campaign and meet the populace as they saw such events as liabilities rather than opportunities to win over the public, and showed little interest in gaining popular support in any case, as they could always count on a rigging of the ballot. The CIA reported that the pair had no intention of participating on the arranged rallies with the civilian candidates because they felt that "possible heckling from the audience that would be too humiliating." Thiệu and Kỳ were correct; they made one public campaign appearance at a rally, where a very disapproving crowd in Huế assailed Kỳ as a "hooligan" and "cowboy leader".

Kỳ and Thiệu decided to campaign indirectly by appearing at set piece ceremonial appointments, such as transferring land titles to peasants, as hostile elements from the general population were less likely to be present. Thiệu took a restrained and more moderate stance during the campaign toward the issue of democracy, while Kỳ, the public face of the ticket and the incumbent government, went on the attack, damaging the pair's image and supposed commitment to democracy. Kỳ did not hide his distaste for democracy or his opponents and "described the civilian candidates as 'ordure' [dirt, filth, excrement], 'traitors,' and 'destroyers of the national interest.'" He continued on to say that if his opponents continued to attack him, he would cancel the poll. In the accompanying Senate elections, Kỳ openly endorsed 11 slates, but only one was successful in gaining one of the six seats.

During the elections it was reported that armed soldiers "show[ed] voters how to mark their ballots" and that soldiers and police surrounded the legislature as it certified the election results.

== Results ==
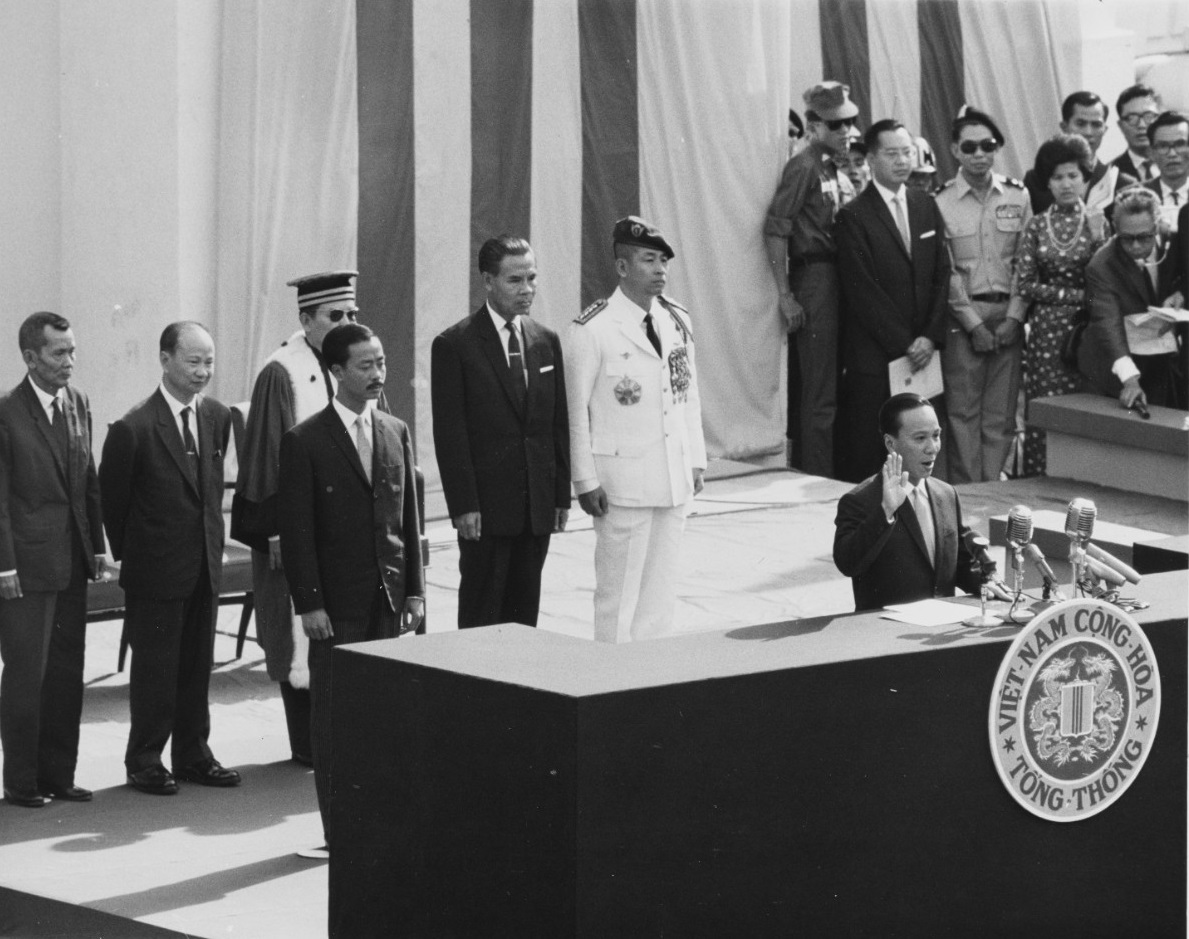
Thiệu takes the oath of office, 31 October 1967

The elections were held under plurality voting and are largely considered to have been fraudulent.

Candidate	Running mate	Votes	%
Nguyễn Văn Thiệu	Nguyễn Cao Kỳ	1,649,561	34.83
Trương Đình Dzu	Trần Văn Chiêu	817,120	17.26
Phan Khắc Sửu	Phan Quang Đán	513,374	10.84
Trần Văn Hương	Mai Thọ Truyền	474,100	10.01
Hà Thúc Ký	Nguyễn Văn Định	349,473	7.38
Nguyễn Đình Quát	Trần Cửu Chấn	291,718	6.16
Nguyễn Hòa Hiệp	Nguyễn Thế Truyền	160,790	3.40
Vũ Hồng Khanh	Dương Trung Đường	149,276	3.15
Hoàng Cơ Bình	Lưu Quang Khình	131,071	2.77
Phạm Huy Cơ	Lý Quốc Sinh	106,317	2.25
Trần Văn Lý	Huỳnh Công Đương	92,604	1.96
Total		4,735,404	100.00
Valid votes		4,735,404	97.27
Invalid/blank votes		132,862	2.73
Total votes		4,868,266	100.00
Registered voters/turnout		5,853,251	83.17
Source: Congressional Record
