= National Social Democratic Front =

National Social Democratic Front Mặt trận Quốc gia Dân chủ Xã hội
- Leader: Nguyễn Văn Thiệu (honorary); Nguyễn Văn Hiếu (de facto)
- Founded: 1967
- Dissolved: 1975
- Merger of: Democratic Progressive Party; National Revolutionary Movement; National Progressive Movement; Alliance of Democratic and Peaceful Forces; Vietnamese Nationalist Party; Vietnamese Democratic Socialist Party; Vietnam Republic Veterans' Association; Peasants' and Workers' Party ⋮ Personalist Labor Revolutionary Party ex-members
- Preceded by: Democratic Progressive Party
- Headquarters: Saigon
- Ideology: Secularism; Civic nationalism Vietnamese nationalism Anti-communism
- Political position: Big tent
- Colors: Red White Yellow
- Slogan: Tự do—Dân chủ—Tiến bộ—Phú cường ('Freedom—Democracy—Progress—Prosperity')

Party flag

The National Social Democratic Front (Vietnamese: Mặt trận Quốc gia Dân chủ Xã hội), later named the Social Democratic Alliance (Vietnamese: Liên minh Dân chủ Xã hội), was a South Vietnamese political party which was effectively a federation of different groups, united by their anti-communist stance. Its chairman was Lt. Gen. Nguyễn Văn Thiệu, leader of South Vietnam from 1965–1975.

== History ==
=== Democratic Progressive Party ===
The party was founded as the Democratic Progressive Party (Vietnamese: Đảng Dân-chủ Tiến-bộ) or simply Democratic Party (Vietnamese: Đảng Dân-Chủ) by Nguyễn Văn Thiệu in 1967. It was not linked with its North Vietnam namesake, aligned with the Viet Minh and Communists. The Democratic Party, purportedly representing farmers, workers and small traders, participated in the presidential election of 1967, supporting President Nguyễn Văn Thiệu and his military rule. The party also adopted the flag of the National Revolutionary Movement and the Vanguard Youth, a youth organization that participated in August Revolution in 1945 against French colonial rule.

=== National Social Democratic Front ===
As the Vietnam War flared up, the Democratic Party tried to build a coalition with other anti-communist parties. In May 1969, the Democrats finally dissolved and formed a new party, the National Social Democratic Front. The party quickly became a federation of several organizations and parties, such as persecuted Roman Catholics who fled from North Vietnam; the Vietnam Republic Veterans Association, who sympathized with military rule; the Vietnamese Kuomintang, ideologically opposed to communism like its Chinese counterpart; the Democratic Socialist Party, who rejected communists' atheism for Buddhist socialism; the Nationalist Party of Greater Vietnam (along with its militant's branch, the National Radical Movement), that desired to reunify Vietnam but not under communists; the Personalist Revolutionary Party, the heir of Can Lao Party; and the Peasants' and Workers' Party, supporting rural interests and opposed to the Viet Cong's guerrilla.

=== Social Democratic Alliance ===
The parties' federation was functional during Nguyễn Văn Thiệu's tenure as president and changed its name to Social Democratic Alliance in 1973. However, with the Vietnamization policy adopted by U.S. President Richard Nixon, South Vietnam inexorably started its collapse. The Paris Peace Accords of 1973 was a turning point in the war, causing the end of American intervention in Vietnam. Despite the peace agreement between communist North Vietnam and capitalist South Vietnam, in 1975 North Vietnam broke the peace and started the takeover of South Vietnam. Since the United States refused another intervention, South Vietnam collapsed after the Fall of Saigon, causing the reunification of Vietnam under communist rule.

=== Democratic Alliance for Vietnam ===
Many members of the Front and South Vietnamese government were executed by the new administration, but others fled from Vietnam. In 1981, many former members of the Front created the Democratic Alliance for Vietnam, a pluralist extra-parliamentary opposition group based in California who advocate for democracy in Vietnam.

== Prominent members ==
- Bùi Diễm
- Đỗ Mậu
- Hồ Ngọc Nhuận
- Hoàng Đức Nhã
- Lê Minh Trí
- Nguyễn Bá Cẩn
- Nguyễn Bá Lương
- Nguyễn Cao Kỳ
- Nguyễn Hữu Có
- Nguyễn Ngọc Huy
- Nguyễn Tôn Hoàn
- Nguyễn Văn Hảo
- Nguyễn Văn Hiếu
- Nguyễn Văn Kiểu
- Nguyễn Văn Thiệu
- Nguyễn Xuân Oánh
- Phan Quang Đán
- Tôn Thất Đính
- Trần Thiện Khiêm
- Trần Văn Đỗ
- Trần Văn Đôn
- Trần Văn Hương
- Trần Văn Lắm
- Trần Văn Tuyên
- Trần Văn Chiêu
- Trần Trung Dung
- Trương Đình Dzu
- Võ Long Triều
- Vương Văn Bắc
- [...]

== Electoral history ==
=== Presidential elections ===
Election	Party candidate	Running mate	Votes	%	Result
1967	Nguyễn Văn Thiệu	Nguyễn Cao Kỳ	1,649,561	34.83%	Elected ✓
1971	Nguyễn Văn Thiệu	Trần Văn Hương	5,971,114	100%	Elected ✓
