= Trần Văn Lắm =

South Vietnamese diplomat and politician (1913–2001)

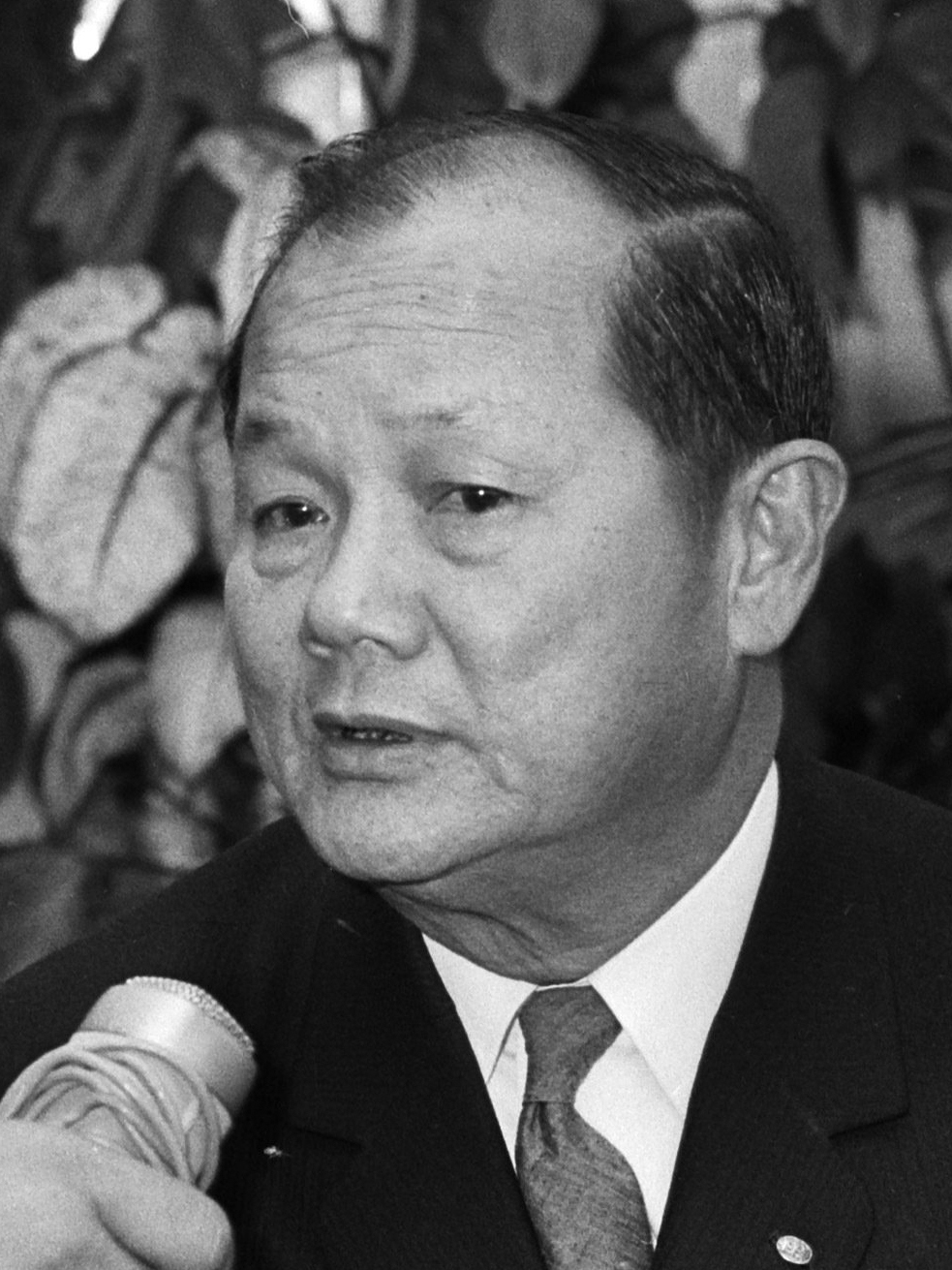
- Lắm being interviewed in 1971

2nd President of the Senate of South Vietnam
- In office October 1973 – 30 April 1975
- Preceded by: Nguyễn Văn Huyền
- Succeeded by: Position abolished

Minister of Foreign Affairs of South Vietnam
- In office 1 September 1969 – 11 July 1973
- Prime Minister: Trần Thiện Khiêm
- Preceded by: Đồng Quang Minh
- Succeeded by: Vương Văn Bắc

South Vietnamese Ambassador to Australia
- In office 1961–1964
- Preceded by: Position established
- Succeeded by: Nguyễn Văn Hiếu

South Vietnamese Ambassador to New Zealand
- In office 1961–1964
- Preceded by: Position established
- Succeeded by: Nguyễn Văn Hiếu

Personal details
- Born: 30 July 1913 Chợ Lớn, Saigon, Cochinchina, French Indochina
- Died: 6 February 2001 (aged 87) Canberra, Australia
- Party: National Social Democratic Front
- Other political affiliations: Cần Lao (until 1963)
- Spouse: Trương Thị Bảy
- Children: 9 (3 sons; 6 daughters)
- Education: Hanoi Medical University
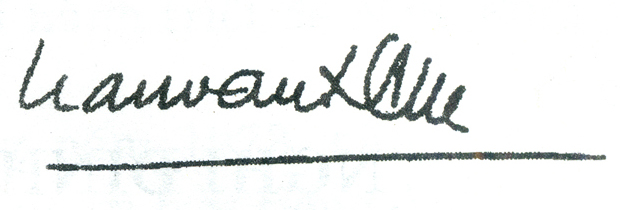
- Signature

Trần Văn Lắm, also known as Charles Trần Văn Lắm (30 July 1913 – 6 February 2001), was a South Vietnamese diplomat and politician, who served as the Minister of Foreign Affairs of the Republic of Vietnam under Prime Minister Trần Thiện Khiêm during the height of the Vietnam War. He was most notable for his role in the Paris Peace Accords that occurred in 1973. In the late 1950s to early 1960s he served as the South Vietnamese Ambassador to both Australia and New Zealand. Lắm served as the President of the Senate of the Republic of Vietnam from 1973 until the Fall of Saigon in 1975.

When Saigon fell in 1975, Trần Văn Lắm was required to sign an undertaking not to take part in any political activities as a condition for his entry into Australia. He moved to Canberra where he and his wife opened a coffee shop. On 6 February 2001, Charles Trần Văn Lắm died in his Canberra home, aged 87.

== Early life ==
The son of a well-to-do ethnic Chinese real estate owner, Trần Văn Lắm was born in Saigon Cholon. He was educated at Hanoi Medical University and trained as a pharmacist. He was the founding Secretary General of the Vietnam Pharmacists Association before his election to the Saigon City Council in 1952, near the end of French colonial rule.

== Rise to power ==
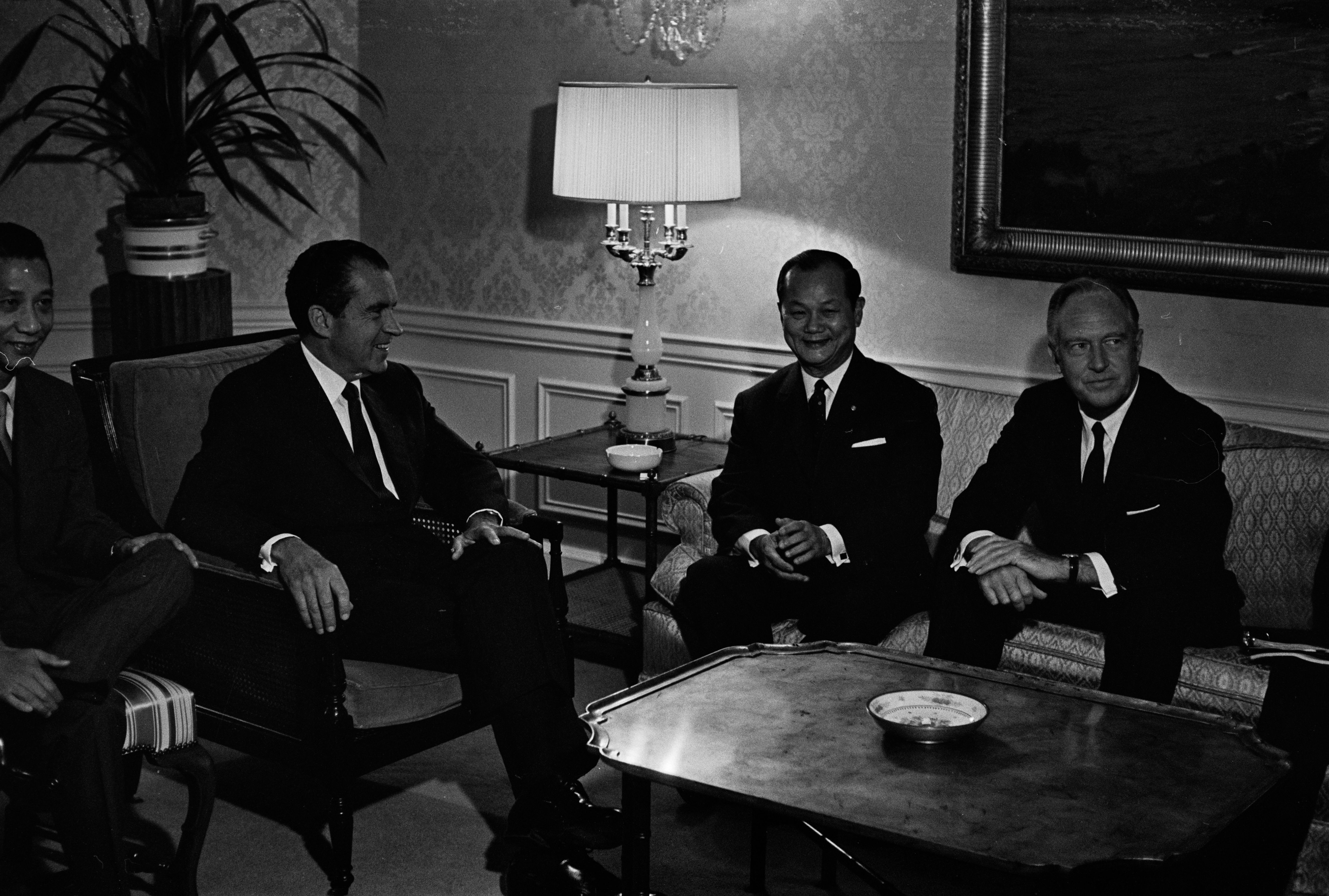
American President Richard Nixon (left) and Secretary of State William P. Rogers (right) meet with Lắm at the Waldorf Astoria Hotel in New York City on 18 September 1969

Lắm moved up to the national legislature and was speaker of the Constituent Assembly in the 1950s and the majority leader of the Assembly after that. In 1961, President Ngô Đình Diệm appointed him ambassador to Australia and New Zealand.

A soft-spoken urbane diplomat fluent in French and English, he remained in the post after Diệm's assassination in 1963. Trần Văn Lắm returned to private life as chairman of the Vietnam Commercial and Industrial Bank from 1964 to 1967. In 1969 he became the minister for foreign affairs of South Vietnam.

On 27 May 1970, South Vietnamese Foreign Minister Trần Văn Lắm signed a document with his Cambodian counterpart Yem Sambaur to restore diplomatic relations between South Vietnam and Cambodia, with a commitment to exchange ambassadors in the future. On that same day, the two sides also signed two documents concerning Vietnamese nationals in Cambodia, as well as economic and financial cooperation.

The following day, the two foreign ministers held a joint press conference to issue a communiqué. The communiqué consists of 17 points, covering the following: Cambodia and South Vietnam agreed to resume diplomatic relations at the ambassadorial level; Yem Sambaur announced that Cambodia had severed diplomatic ties with North Vietnam and the North Vietnamese-controlled Provisional Revolutionary Government; both sides emphasized respect for the principles of the United Nations Charter, as well as for each other’s territorial integrity and existing borders; they agreed to normalize economic and financial relations and to resolve outstanding issues between the two nations; Cambodia pledged to protect the lives and property of Vietnamese nationals residing in Cambodia, ensure the security of those who remain, and facilitate the return of those who had previously repatriated; regarding the Cambodian request concerning the status of the Khmer community in South Vietnam, Lam stated that the matter would be considered in a spirit of sincere cooperation and in accordance with the South Vietnamese Constitution; on military matters, the communiqué noted that South Vietnamese forces would withdraw from Cambodia upon the completion of their mission there. Furthermore, Yem Sambaur expressed gratitude to South Vietnam for its intervention in Cambodia and commended the fighting spirit of the South Vietnamese people. On this occasion, Yem Sambaur invited Lắm to pay an official visit to Cambodia; Lắm accepted the invitation, with the specific dates for the visit to be arranged by both sides at a later time.

== Media ==
All Points of the Compass A Vietnamese Diaspora (2005) Directed by Judy Rymer, Australian Broadcasting Corporation OCLC 156899092

Charles Trần Van Lam had the ill-fated destiny to be foreign minister of South Vietnam during the devastating war with the North. He was a patriot, committed to seeing his country emerge from its colonial history. He was also the father of nine children, who with his wife formed a seemingly privileged family, which dined together, had vacations at the beach, learned musical instruments, and were instilled with their Vietnamese identity. As the war intensified, he and his wife made provisions for the children to leave the country. The nine children were dispersed to Australia, France, the U.S. and Scotland. The hope was that they would be educated abroad and bring their talents back to their native country.

That was not to be. Trần Van Lam was betrayed by the United States, his ally against the North. While he was a delegate to the Paris peace talks, Henry Kissinger secretly arranged the pull out with the North. Fortunate to be airlifted out at the fall of Saigon, he and his wife finally emigrated to Australia with one small bag, where they ultimately opened a coffee shop.

The adult children, now in mid -career with families of their own, speak poignantly about their experience of dislocation. They each longed to be re-united as a family and had to struggle to forge a new identity in a foreign land. They were all deeply affected by their father's expectations to become accomplished and"give back." Each one feels "multicultural." All Points of the Compass is at once a gripping portrait of the "immigrant experience" and a new perspective on the American role in the Vietnam War.

(Best Documentary, ACT Film Awards, 2004; Bilan du Film Ethnographic, Paris, 2005)

== See also ==
- Vietnamese Australian
