= Vietnamese Social Democratic Party =

Vietnamese Social Democratic Party Việt Nam Dân chủ Xã hội Đảng
- President: Nguyễn Văn Sâm
- General Secretary: Nguyễn Bảo Toàn (1946–1962)
- Founder: Huỳnh Phú Sổ
- Founded: 21 September 1946 (79 years, 319 days)
- Dissolved: 30 April 1975 (51 years, 98 days)
- Headquarters: Chau Doc
- Ideology: Vietnamese nationalism Social democracy Buddhist socialism Democratic socialism
- Religion: Hòa Hảo
- Slogan: Cách mạng con người Cách mạng dân tộc Cách mạng xã hội (Human Revolution, National Revolution, Social Revolution)

Party flag

The Vietnamese Social Democratic Party (Vietnamese: Việt Nam Dân chủ Xã hội Đảng, abbreviated as Đảng Dân Xã), also translated as the Vietnamese Democratic Socialist Party, was a political party established in southern Vietnam in 1946 and active in South Vietnam until 1975.

== History ==
It was founded in 21 September 1946 by Huỳnh Phú Sổ, the founder of Vietnamese new religious movement Hòa Hảo.

The party was formed through the unity of a sector of socialist-minded people in Saigon and some provincial sect leaders. The party was persecuted by the Việt Minh, predecessor of North Vietnam. Huỳnh Phú Sổ was killed by the Việt Minh in 1947, after which the party was dissolved.

In February 1955, General Nguyễn Giác Ngộ of Hòa Hảo claimed that the party had been revived. The party obtained three seats in the 1959 National Assembly election of South Vietnam.

When the Republic of Vietnam collapsed in 1975, the Dân Xã also disintegrated. The government of the Republic of South Vietnam hunted down and arrested many members of the Dân Xã. Several leaders of the Dân Xã, such as Phan Ba Cam, Nguyen Van Ca, and Trinh Quoc Khanh, were arrested and died in prison. Some members of the Dân Xã after 1975 gathered to resume activities overseas. However, these activities did not gain much traction.

== See also ==
- Vietnam National Restoration League
- National Social Democratic Front
