= Personalist Labor Revolutionary Party =

Political party in South Vietnam

Personalist Labor Revolutionary Party Cần lao Nhân vị Cách mạng Ðảng
- Leader: Ngô Đình Diệm
- General Secretary: Ngô Đình Nhu
- Founded: 2 September 1954
- Dissolved: 2 November 1963
- Headquarters: Saigon, South Vietnam
- Newspaper: "Society" (Xã hội)
- Youth wing: "Revolutionary Youth"
- Women's wing: "Women Solidarity Movement"
- Membership (1962): 1,368,757
- Ideology: Person Dignity Theory; Anti-communism; Vietnamese nationalism
- Political position: Centre
- Religion: Catholicism
- Colours: Green
- Slogan: Labor – Revolution – Personalism (Cần lao - Cách mạng - Nhân vị)
- National Assembly (1963): 66 / 123

Party flag
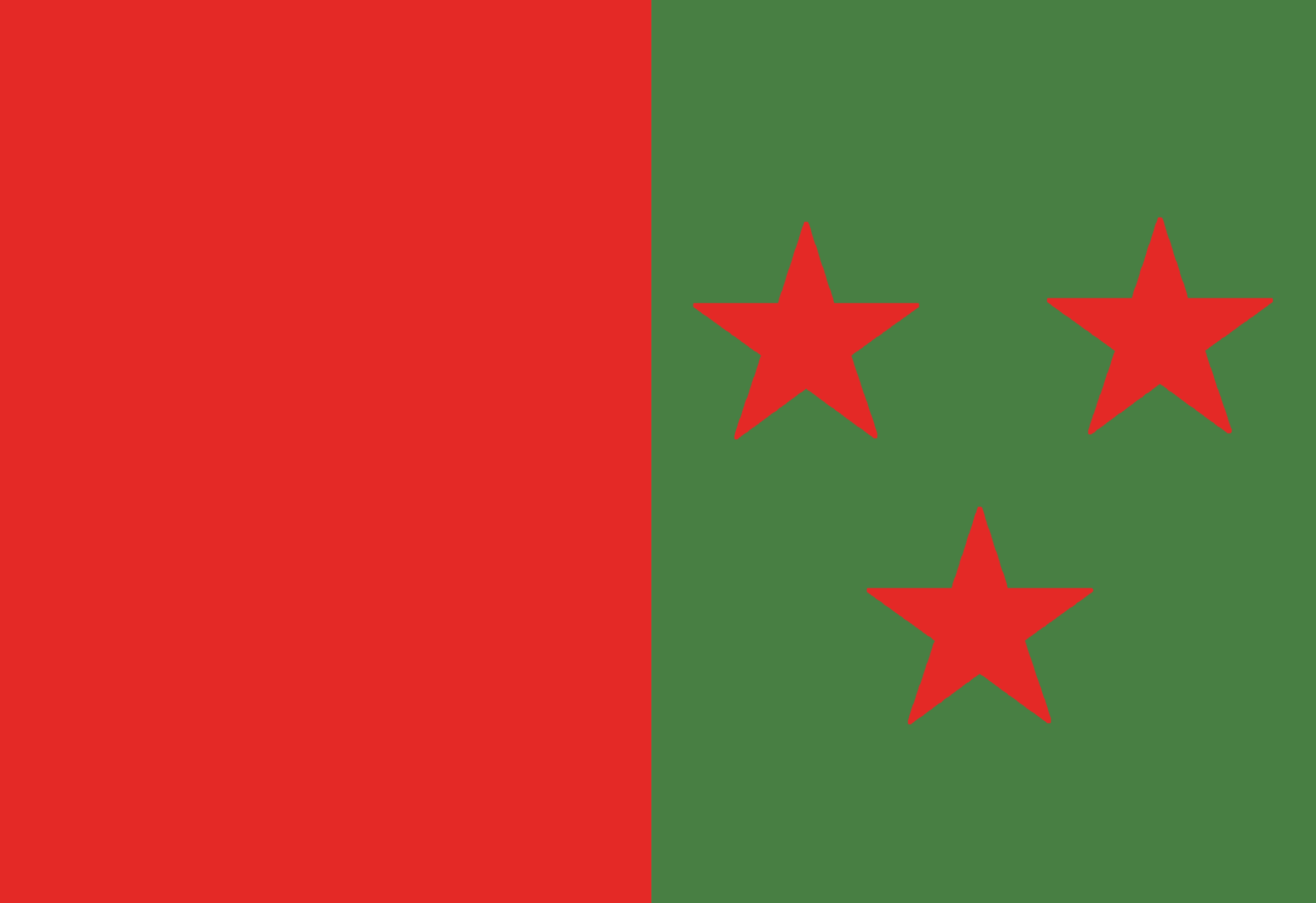

The Personalist Labor Revolutionary Party (Vietnamese: Cần lao Nhân vị Cách mạng Ðảng), often simply called the Cần Lao Party, was a Vietnamese political party, formed in the early 1950s by the President of South Vietnam Ngô Đình Diệm and his brother and adviser Ngô Đình Nhu. Based on mass-organizations and secret networks as effective instruments, the party played a considerable role in creating a political groundwork for Diệm's power and helped him to control all political activities in South Vietnam. The doctrine of the party was based on the Person Dignity Theory (Thuyết Nhân Vị).

== Formation ==
According to Ngo Dinh Nhu, the party was the "fusion" of the groups which were founded by him in the early 1950s. In Northern Vietnam, he collaborated with Trần Trung Dung, a Catholic activist who then became South Vietnam's deputy minister of defense. In central Vietnam, Ngô Đình Cẩn's network of loyalists was Nhu's fulcrum. In early 1954, Cẩn established core groups of supporters inside the Army and civil service of the State of Vietnam.

In southern Vietnam, Nhu established a group which served mainly as a roundtable for political debates of intellectuals linked to a journal entitled "Spirit" (Vietnamese: Tinh Thần). In 1953, Nhu allied with Trần Quốc Bửu, a trade unionist who headed the Vietnamese Confederation of Labour with tens of thousands of members. They began to publish a journal called "Society" (Vietnamese: Xã hội), which endorsed the creation of workers' and farmers' cooperatives and unionization rights for industrial laborers in Saigon. Through the alliance with Bửu, Miller argues that the Cần Lao program follows unionism and advocates the co-management of national industry by representatives of capitalists and labors, as well as workers' participation in interest and technological development of industries.

According to decree 116/BNV/CT of the State of Vietnam, the Cần Lao Party was established on 2 September 1954. Nhu became the General Secretary of the party. Initially, the Party was named the "Personalist Revolutionary Party of Workers and Peasants" (Nông công Nhân vị Cách mạng Đảng), then this name was replaced by "Personalist Labor Revolutionary Party" (Cần lao Nhân vị Cách mạng Đảng). According to Miller, the name "Cần Lao" shows Nhu's profound concern in political potential of Vietnamese labors which related to French unionist ideology. The slogan of the Party was: Labor – Revolution – Personalism (Cần lao - Cách mạng - Nhân vị).

== Guiding ideology ==
Personalism was the foundation of the Cần Lao Party. Ngô Đình Nhu was the founder of Personalism in South Vietnam and Ngô Đình Diệm applied this doctrine as the national ideology — the backbone of the regime. It was also called "Oriental Personalism" (Vietnamese: Chủ nghĩa nhân vị phương Đông) by researchers of the Republic of Vietnam and "Spiritual Personalism" (Vietnamese: Chủ nghĩa Duy linh nhân vị) by communist researchers.

When he came back from France, Nhu was passionate about the Personalism of Emmanuel Mounier, a prominent French Catholic philosopher, and believed that Mounier's ideology which rejected Liberalism and Communism (materialism) could be a "third path" to be applied for social development (and Spiritualism) in Vietnam. The Ngô brothers also believed that Personalism could go well with their Third Force which was not in line with French colonialism or the communism of the Việt Minh. For Diệm's regime, Personalism was treated as the only doctrine which restored the best traditional values of Asia and combined them with Western values to innovate the state and serve public interests. It can be a counterbalance to communist doctrine.

From April 1952, Nhu's ideas on Personalism were delineated in his speech at Vietnamese National Military Academy in Dalat. He contended that, initially, Personalism was a Catholic ideology, though it had universal relevance and was compatible to Vietnam, which had to suffer from the devastation of wars. For Nhu, Personalism was a form of Revolution which was more transformative than Marxist socialism, and he described himself as an advocate of "personalist revolution". Ngô Đình Diệm also understood the term "Personalism" in the etymology of nhân vị, which could mean either "humanity" or "human being". The Ngô brothers used the term Personalist Revolution to frame their nation-building programs. On 26 October 1956, the Republic of Vietnam's Constitution was promulgated. Its preface declared that "Building Politics, Economy, Society, Culture for the people basing on respecting Personalism". Simultaneously, Diệm's regime laid down as a policy the teaching of Personalism in universities and the propaganda of the doctrine in South Vietnam.

Nevertheless, according to some scholars, Nhu's personalism was evaluated as "a vague mish–mash of ideas" or "a hodgepodge" because "it was a mixture of Catholic teachings, Mounier's Personalism, Confucius' humanism, some factors of capitalism and anti-communist spiritualism" and its actual substance was "maddeningly opaque". Thus, even Vietnamese intellectuals could not understand Nhu's doctrine; neither could Americans, who spent much time in examining his doctrine and gave up. Lately, the values of Personalism itself had been revised. According to Nguyễn Ngọc Tấn, their Personalism, along with their Democratic Ethical Regime based on Personalism as a combination of the quintessence of Western values and Asian values, was a contribution to political science, especially in resolving the democratization issue in developing post-colonial countries, such as Vietnam today. Nguyễn Lập Duy, on the other hand, has argued that Personalism can be characterized as a form of Marxist humanism.

== Activities ==
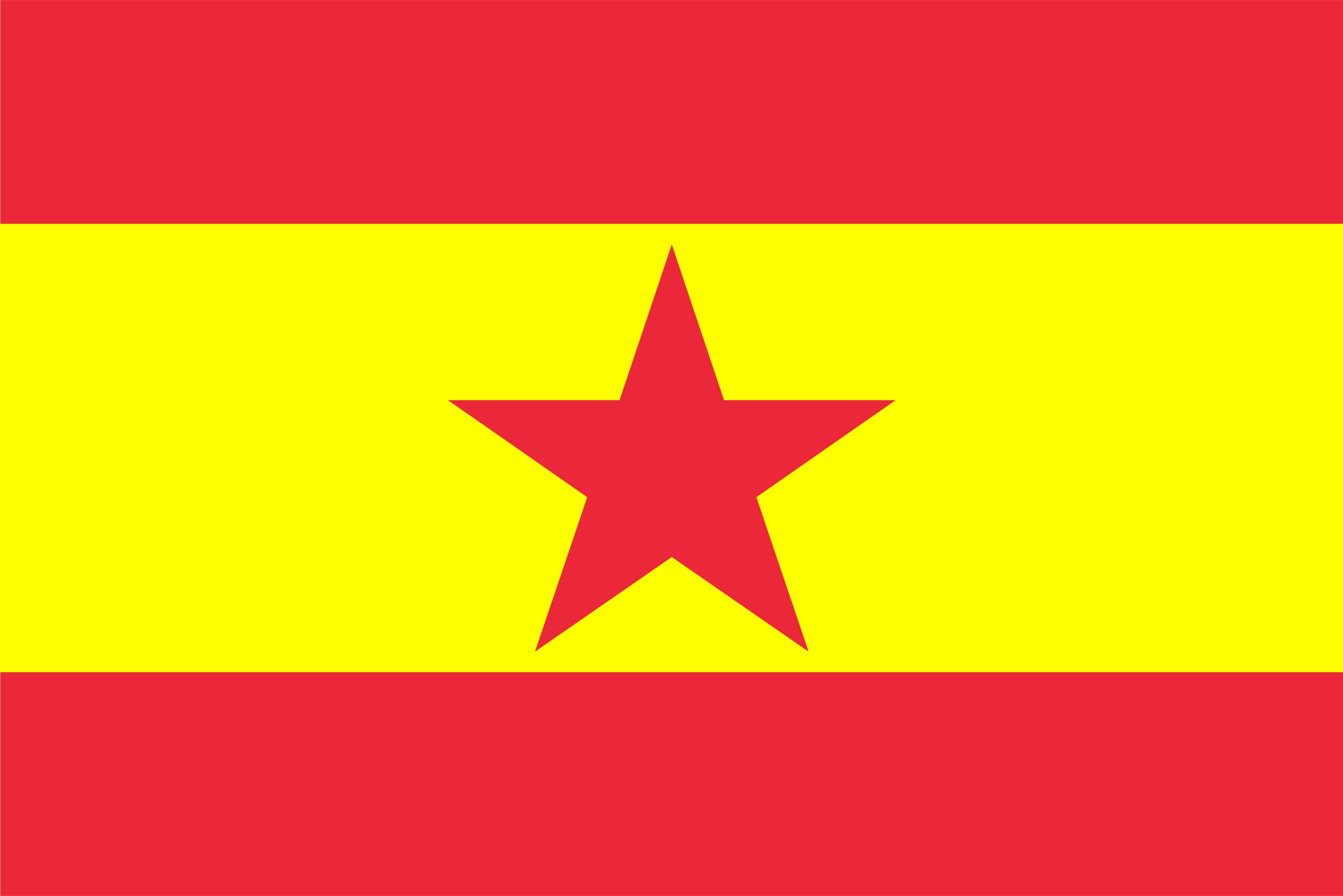
Flag of the National Revolutionary Movement

Flag of the Vietnamese Women's Solidarity Movement

Flag of the Republican Youth Movement

Initially, the party acted secretly, with networks of cells and members only knowing a few members' identities; when necessary, the party could replace the role of the government. It also included any factors that could help its agents to penetrate the army, national assembly, police, educational system and the media. Fall describes the party as "a state within a state" in its own governmental mechanism, which was what a Communist party would do. In the early years of 1950s, Diệm and Nhu used the party to mobilize support for Diệm's political movements. The cadres of the party were Catholic organizations such as the Union of Catholicism, Catholic Youth and Catholic Society, with Catholic dignitaries and followers, officers in the army. Ngô Đình Nhu was the general secretary of the Central Committee Board including Trần Trung Dung, Nguyễn Tăng Nguyên, Lý Trung Dung, Đoàn Nhật Tân (Hà Đức Minh), Trần Quốc Bửu, Võ Như Nguyện and Lê Văn Đông.

This ideological framework allowed the Central Committee to justify its clandestine, vanguard-style control over the state's military and civil apparatus—often referred to by critics as a form of nepotism—as a necessary defense of the national soul. To execute this mandate, the Central Committee maintained a sophisticated cellular hierarchy. This included the deployment of covert Base Chiefs (Chủ cơ) to enforce ideological discipline across strategic provincial corridors, and the use of Parliamentary Advisors (Cố vấn Quốc hội) to tightly script legislation within the National Assembly. Furthermore, the party's intelligence apparatus extended to overseas police networks (Hải ngoại Cảnh sát) to monitor expatriate dissidents, while domestically coordinating counter-intelligence and interrogation operations against communist insurgents.

The party also declared the goals of struggling for the revolutionary ideology: Personalism; constructing the nation in four aspects: spirit, society, politics and economy. The principle of the party was centralized democracy. In its political manifesto, it criticized both Capitalism and Communism. In less than a year, the Can Lao had all the key positions in the government, like national security and Ministry of Defence offices. With the military's support, the Can Lao started a dominant-party rule.

After 1954, the existence of the party was recognized but its activities have been hidden from public view. In 1955, Nhu practiced the governmentized policy which aimed at placing 70% members of the party to important positions in the government. On 6 July 1955, Nhu established an Office for social and political studies led by Trần Kim Tuyến, the general Secretary of the party, and a Special Force led by Lê Quang Tung. On 2 October 1955, Nhu established the National Revolutionary Movement (Vietnamese: Phong trào cách mạng quốc gia) including party members and nominated Trần Chánh Thành, Minister of Information, as its president. The organization includes members above 21 years old from different parties and religions. This organization played an important role in drawing up and carrying on policies of South Vietnam, helped Diệm to win in the elections in 1955 and 1959 and the presidential election in 1961. The Party's activities were represented through those organizations.

On 26 October 1955, Diệm declared the establishment of the Republic of Vietnam. On 29 October 1955, Diệm promulgated the decree 4-TPP to establish the first government, which embraced most of the Can Lao party's members in key positions. The party had 112/123 positions in the National Assembly. In 1956, Diệm and Nhu established the Personalism Training Center in Vĩnh Long Province, administrated by the bishop Ngô Đình Thục, to train the key personnel for propagandizing Personalism in South Vietnam. The administrative and teaching staff included Catholic priests and followers. On 31 December 1957, Diệm forced the administrative and military personnel in the government to join the training on Personalism. From 1956–1963, the Center trained about 25,000 personnel for the government.

In 1958, the party established its youth wing, the "Revolutionary Youth", led by Nhu, that obtained a strong influence in the rural areas. Also, the membership increased: from 10,000 members in 1955 to 1,500,000. In 1962, there were 1,386,757 members active in the party. In 1961, the party formed a women's wing, the "Women Solidarity Movement", led by First Lady Madame Nhu. The organization formed also military training for women, and organized charity initiatives, like blood donation, distribution of medicines to the village and visits to soldiers on the frontline.

During the military coup in November 1963, Diệm and Nhu were assassinated and the party was subsequently banned and dissolved. The party was later rebuilt as Personalist Revolutionary Party of Vietnam in 1965.

== Prominent members ==
- Bùi Đình Đạm
- Đoàn Nhật Tân (Hà Đức Minh)
- Lê Quang Tung
- Ngô Đình Cẩn
- Ngô Đình Diệm
- Ngô Đình Luyện
- Ngô Đình Nhu
- Ngô Đình Thục
- Nguyễn Văn Thiệu
- Phạm Đăng Lâm
- Tôn Thất Đính
- Trần Chánh Thành
- Trần Lệ Xuân
- Trần Thiện Khiêm
- Trần Văn Lắm
- Trương Vĩnh Lễ

== Electoral history ==
=== Presidential elections ===
Election	Party candidate	Votes	%	Result
1961	Ngo Dinh Diem		89%	Elected ✓
