= 1971 South Vietnamese parliamentary election =

Elections to the House of Representatives were held in South Vietnam on 29 August 1971. Only a few candidates were affiliated with political parties. They were the final elections held in South Vietnam, as its government was overthrown by the North in 1975 and unified with the North in 1976.

== Electoral system ==
In order to elect members of the House of Representatives, each province and city acted as an electoral district, except the city of Saigon, which was divided into three districts, and the province of Gia Định, which was divided into two districts. Voters had as many votes as there were seats to be filled. In single-member districts, this made the electoral system single-member plurality: in districts where there were more than one seat to be filled, this became the multiple non-transferable vote system.

== Results ==
Voter turnout was 79%, with 5,567,446 of the 7,085,943 registered voters voting.

=== Elected members by province ===
Province	Candidate	Votes	%
Saigon (District 1)	Hồ Ngọc Cừ	29,444	20.7
Saigon (District 1)	Lý Quí Chung	28,797	20.2
Saigon (District 1)	Nguyễn Hữu Chung	23,370	16.4
Saigon (District 1)	Nguyễn Trọng Nho	17,639	12.4
Saigon (District 1)	Trần Văn Tuyên	17,232	12.1
Saigon (District 2)
Saigon (District 2)	Trương Vi Trí	32,932	28.7
Saigon (District 2)	Huỳnh Ngọc Anh	21,031	18.3
Saigon (District 2)	Gip A Sáng	19,923	17.3
Saigon (District 2)	Diệp Văn Hưng	18,739	16.3
Saigon (District 3)
Saigon (District 3)	Hồ Văn Minh	41,977	30.2
Saigon (District 3)	Võ Văn Phát	35,528	25.6
Saigon (District 3)	Hồ Ngọc Nhuận	31,858	22.9
Saigon (District 3)	Phan Công Phú	20,331	14.6
Source: Public Administration Bulletin Vietnam

As voters in districts that elected more than one member had more than one vote, percentages may not add up to 100%.
