= 1967 South Vietnamese parliamentary election =

Parliamentary elections were held in South Vietnam on 22 October 1967. Only a few candidates were affiliated with political parties. At least 9 seats were won by the Việt Nam Quốc Dân Đảng, all from districts in central Vietnam, where they tended to poll between 20 and 40% in various areas. The VNQDĐ members made several loose alliances with Hòa Hảo members of the lower house.

Voter turnout was reported to be 73%, with 4,270,794 of the 5,853,251 registered voters voting.
