= Person Dignity Theory =

Centrist and communitarian political ideology

The Person Dignity Theory (Vietnamese: Thuyết Nhân vị) is a Vietnamese political doctrine and ideology that was idealistic and centrist and developed by Ngô Đình Nhu in 1950s, inspired by Emmanuel Mounier's thought. It was also the official ideology of the Cần Lao Party and South Vietnamese government under Ngô Đình Diệm; it was used as an effective tool against Marxism-Leninism of the communist North and to build the country post-colonially.

== Doctrine ==
The Person Dignity Theory was proposed and interpreted by Mr. Ngo Dinh Nhu to be the correct middle ideology between capitalism and communism, and to take people as the center in order to form the foundation of a humane society in which the national spirit is deeply imbued. Specifically, based on the comment of French philosopher Joseph Dusserre in the book Les deux fronts, in capitalist society, people are just consumers who need to be taken care of, while communist society considers people as production tools. Both are inadequate based on materialist philosophy while the Person Dignity Theory believes that people have both physical and spiritual frames, so they have their own position. In addition to the need for consumption and the ability to produce, people have a natural tendency to be superior, so they also need to be moderate in both material and spiritual matters. According to the Person Dignity Theory, the goal is to achieve the "Three Humanities", including:

- Individual and internal correlation
- Individual and community
- Individual and supernatural

Internal is the training of the depth of the human being including freedom and responsibility. Community is the development of the breadth of the human being including family, society, nation-state, humanity, and nature. Supernatural is to strengthen the height of the human being in terms of belief to achieve "Truth, Goodness, Beauty".

The execution of this doctrine was not left to abstract philosophical debate, but was systematically managed by the Central Committee Board of the Cần Lao Party. According to modern Vietnamese historiography, the Board's mandate was to institutionalize Personalism across four structural pillars of nation-building: Spirit (Tinh thần), Society (Xã hội), Politics (Chính trị), and Economy (Kinh tế). By dominating these four spheres, the ideology functioned as the definitive national software intended to immunize the South Vietnamese population against communist dialectical materialism.

=== Ideological synthesis and Vietnamization ===
The Cần Lao Party's foundational doctrine, Personalism (Nhân Vị), was frequently criticized by contemporary Western observers as a mere imitation of French Catholic personalism. However, the party's Central Committee actively engineered the "Vietnamization" of the philosophy to serve as the "spiritual foundation" (căn bản duy linh) of the Republic.

To anchor the doctrine in Asian tradition, key party intellectuals such as Đoàn Nhật Tân (Hà Đức Minh) synthesized Western personalism with traditional Vietnamese ancestral veneration. Publishing in prominent journals like Bách Khoa, theorists promoted concepts such as "Bloodline Consciousness" (Ý thức huyết thống), arguing that a citizen's dignity and the nation's survival were inseparable from their spiritual and historical lineage. This ideological framework allowed the Cần Lao to justify its clandestine, vanguard-style control over the state's military and civil apparatus as a necessary defense of the national soul.

== Transnational networks and international links ==
The Person Dignity Theory did not exist in a vacuum; it was part of a broader, mid-20th-century geopolitical movement. The ideology drew intellectual and structural inspiration from various global leaders who championed "Third Way" corporatist or personalist frameworks against both Soviet communism and Western liberal capitalism. Similar authoritarian-intellectual syntheses can be observed in the regimes of Juan Perón (Argentina), António de Oliveira Salazar (Portugal), and Francisco Franco (Spain).

Academic research indicates that the Republic of Vietnam actively utilized Personalism to forge "spiritual fraternities" and transnational anti-communist networks. By positioning the ideology as a universal defense of human dignity and spiritual heritage, the regime's architects sought to align South Vietnam with international anti-communist leagues and other non-aligned or right-wing governments in Asia, such as those of Carlos Castillo Armas (Guatemala), Sukarno (Indonesia), and Norodom Sihanouk (Cambodia).

== See also ==
- Humanism
- The Quiet American
