= South Vietnam =

Country in Southeast Asia (1955–1975)

Republic of Vietnam Việt Nam Cộng hòa
- 1955–1975
- Flag Coat of arms (1967–1975)
- Motto: Tổ Quốc – Danh Dự – Trách Nhiệm "Homeland – Honor – Duty"
- Anthem: Tiếng gọi công dân "Call to the Citizens"
- Presidential seal: (1955–1963) (1967–1975)

- The administrative territory of the Republic of Vietnam during the war (dark green); territory claimed but not controlled (light green).
- Status: Sovereign state
- Capital and largest city: Saigon; 10.78°N 106.70°E
- Official languages: Vietnamese
- Other languages: French; English; Cantonese; Khmer; other minority languages
- Demonyms: South Vietnamese; Vietnamese
- Government: Unitary authoritarian presidential republic (1955–1963); Military junta (1963–1967); Unitary semi-presidential republic (1967–1975)
- President
  - 1955–1963: Ngô Đình Diệm
  - 1963–1967: vacant (military juntas)
  - 1967–1975: Nguyễn Văn Thiệu
  - 1975: Trần Văn Hương
  - 1975: Dương Văn Minh
- Prime Minister
  - 1954–1955 (first): Ngô Đình Diệm (Note: as Prime Minister of the State of Vietnam)
  - 1975 (last): Vũ Văn Mẫu
- Vice President
  - 1956–1963: Nguyễn Ngọc Thơ
  - 1963–1967: vacant
  - 1967–1971: Nguyễn Cao Kỳ
  - 1971–1975: Trần Văn Hương
  - 1975: Nguyễn Văn Huyền
- Legislature: National Assembly
  - Upper house: Senate
  - Lower house: House of Representatives
- Historical era: Cold War
  - State of Vietnam: 1949
  - Diệm's premiership: 26 June 1954
  - Partition of Vietnam: 21 July 1954
  - First Republic proclaimed: 26 October 1955
  - NLF established: 20 December 1960
  - 1963 coup d'état: 1 November 1963
  - Second Republic established: 1 April 1967
  - Paris Accords: 27 January 1973
  - Fall of Saigon: 30 April 1975

Area
  - Total: 173,809 km^{2} (67,108 sq mi)

Population
  - 1955: c. 12 million
  - 1968: 16,258,334
  - 1974: 19,582,000
  - Density: 93.55 (Note: according to 1968 data)/km^{2} (242.3/sq mi)
- Currency: đồng
- Time zone: UTC+8 (Saigon Standard Time – SST)
Preceded by	Succeeded by
State of Vietnam	Republic of South Vietnam
- Today part of: Vietnam

The Republic of Vietnam (RVN; Vietnamese: Việt Nam Cộng hòa, VNCH), commonly known as South Vietnam, was a country in Southeast Asia that existed from 1955 to 1975. It first garnered recognition in 1949 as the associated State of Vietnam within the French Union, with its capital at Saigon. Since 1950, it was a member of the Western Bloc during the Cold War. Following the 1954 partition of Vietnam, it became known as South Vietnam and was established as a republic in 1955. Although South Vietnam failed to gain admission into the United Nations as a result of a Soviet veto in 1957, its sovereignty was recognized by 95 countries as of January 1975. It was succeeded by the communist-controlled Republic of South Vietnam in 1975. In 1976, North Vietnam and the Republic of South Vietnam merged to form the Socialist Republic of Vietnam.

In September 1945, as World War II came to an end, the communist-led Viet Minh, under Ho Chi Minh, seized power and proclaimed the Democratic Republic of Vietnam (DRV) in Hanoi, leading to civil conflicts.

In 1949, during the First Indochina War, the French and Vietnamese nationalists established the State of Vietnam (SVN), led by former emperor Bảo Đại, as an anti-communist alternative. Returning from exile in June 1954, Ngô Đình Diệm, recognized as the prominent anti-communist and anti-colonialist figure, was appointed prime minister of the SVN.

After the 1954 Geneva Conference, the DRV took control of North Vietnam, while the SVN administered South Vietnam, which encompassed the southern and part of the central regions of the country. A 1955 referendum on the state's future form of government was widely marred by electoral fraud and resulted in the deposal of Bảo Đại by Prime Minister Ngô Đình Diệm, who proclaimed himself president of the new republic on 26 October 1955. Diệm adopted personalism, a doctrine rejecting communism, liberalism and capitalism, as the official ideology of the regime. His authoritarian tendencies provoked resentment and opposition during the communist insurgency, and Diệm was killed in a CIA-backed military coup led by general Dương Văn Minh in 1963, and a series of short-lived military governments followed which ended in 1967 with General Nguyễn Cao Kỳ ratifying a constitution which formally granted liberal democratic freedoms. General Nguyễn Văn Thiệu then led the country after a disputed civilian presidential election from 1967 until 1975. Amidst escalating communist aggression, his rule grew authoritarian while maintaining a degree of political freedoms and an active civil society.

The Vietnam War emerged from an insurgency by the newly organized Viet Cong, armed and supported by North Vietnam, with backing mainly from China and the Soviet Union. Larger escalation of the insurgency occurred in 1965 with American intervention and the introduction of regular forces of Marines, followed by Army units to supplement the cadre of military advisors guiding the Republic's armed forces. A regular bombing campaign over North Vietnam was conducted by offshore US Navy airplanes, warships, and aircraft carriers joined by Air Force squadrons through 1966 and 1967. Fighting peaked up to that point during the Tet Offensive of February 1968, when there were over a million South Vietnamese soldiers, 500,000 U.S. soldiers, and 100,000 soldiers from other allied nations such as South Korea, Australia, and Thailand in South Vietnam. What started as a guerrilla war eventually turned into a more conventional fight as the balance of power became equalized. An even larger, armored invasion from the North commenced during the Easter Offensive following US ground-forces withdrawal, and had nearly overrun some major southern cities until being beaten back.

Despite a truce agreement under the Paris Peace Accords, concluded in January 1973 after five years of on-and-off negotiations, fighting continued almost immediately afterwards. The regular North Vietnamese army and Viet Cong auxiliaries launched a major combined-arms conventional invasion in 1975. Communist forces overran Saigon on 30 April 1975 in what is called the fall of Saigon, marking the end of the Republic of Vietnam. On 2 July 1976, the Democratic Republic of Vietnam (North Vietnam) and the North Vietnamese-controlled Republic of South Vietnam merged to form the Socialist Republic of Vietnam; Saigon was renamed Ho Chi Minh City.

== Etymology ==
The official name of the South Vietnamese state was the Republic of Vietnam (Vietnamese: Việt Nam Cộng hòa). The North was officially known as the Democratic Republic of Vietnam. Việt Nam (Vietnamese pronunciation: [viət naːm]) was the name adopted by Emperor Gia Long in 1804. It is a variation of "Nam Việt" (南越, 'Southern Yue'), a name used in ancient times. In 1839, Emperor Minh Mạng renamed the country Đại Nam ("Great South"). In 1945, the nation's official name was changed back to "Vietnam". The name is also sometimes rendered as "Viet Nam" in English.

Before 1954, the three regions of Vietnam were often translated into English as North, Central, and South Viet-Nam. Following the 1954 partition of Vietnam into communist and anti-communist parts, it was recommended to refer to Vietnam south of the 17th parallel as Southern Vietnam, but later on, South Vietnam became common usage. Other names commonly used during its existence include Free Vietnam, the national government, and the Government of Viet Nam (GVN).

== History ==
=== Foundations ===
Republican ideas entered French Indochina in the early 20th century, introducing new concepts about the modern nation-state, initially transmitted via China and Japan. By the 1920s, these ideas were embraced by Vietnamese elites, including both revolutionaries and reformers. They influenced Vietnamese independence movements, though suppressed by French colonial authorities. Republican activists were far more popular than communists in the competition between the two groups for leadership of the nationalist movement. This schism long predated the global Cold War and US intervention. Drawing from the deep-rooted tradition of republicanism, South Vietnamese political forces, despite their government's dependence on American assistance, pursued their nation-building projects while vehemently resisting foreign interference.

Caught between communism and colonial reconquest

During World War II, Indochina was administered by Vichy France and occupied by Japan in September 1940. Following the ousting of the French in March 1945 and the surrender of Japan in August of the same year, the Vietnamese were locked in a civil strife over the destiny of their post-colonial state. The nationalist sentiment that had intensified during World War II prepared the ground for the communist-led Viet Minh, which, cloaked in nationalism, seized power from the collapsing Empire of Vietnam during the August Revolution and proclaimed the Democratic Republic of Vietnam (DRV) in Hanoi. In the meantime, the 16th parallel was established following the Potsdam Conference, dividing Vietnam into two military zones: Chinese Nationalist forces occupied the North and British forces the South to disarm Japanese troops. In the South, British-led forces facilitated the return of the French, who fought multiple Vietnamese groups and secured control over Saigon and other urban centers.

The Viet Minh sought to consolidate power by terrorizing and purging rival Vietnamese nationalist groups and Trotskyist activists. In 1946, the Franco-Chinese and Ho–Sainteny Agreements enabled French forces to replace the Chinese north of the 16th parallel and facilitated a coexistence between the DRV and the French that strengthened the Viet Minh while undermining the nationalists. That summer, the Viet Minh colluded with French forces to eliminate nationalists, targeted for their ardent anti-colonialism. By eliminating the nationalist parties, the Viet Minh had undermined Vietnam's broader ability to resist French reconquest. The First Indochina War began on 19 December 1946, as French forces reasserted control over Hanoi and other cities. A number of anti-colonialist and anti-communist nationalists, caught between the two sides of the war, chose an uneasy neutrality and were at times labeled as attentistes, including Ngô Đình Diệm and certain Đại Việt politicians. With the internationalization of the war in 1950, many of these figures ultimately stepped off the fence and entered the political fray.

Enduring fragmentation

The communist destruction of opposition parties in the summer of 1946 hindered prospects for reconciliation. Nationalist partisans and politico-religious groups rallied around former emperor Bảo Đại to negotiate with the French. The State of Vietnam (SVN) was created through co-operation between anti-communist Vietnamese and the French on 14 June 1949. Bảo Đại accepted the position of chief of state (quốc trưởng). In 1950, China, the Soviet Union and other communist states recognised the DRV while the United States and other non-communist countries recognised the SVN. The civil war and the colonial war in Indochina became internationalized and intertwined with the global Cold War.

As the communist-led Viet Minh became increasingly radicalized, many people left its maquis and returned to the cities. Anti-communists accused the communists of manipulating the collective Vietnamese desire for independence to achieve domination. They criticized the Viet Minh for their revolutionary violence and repression, class struggle, and thought control.

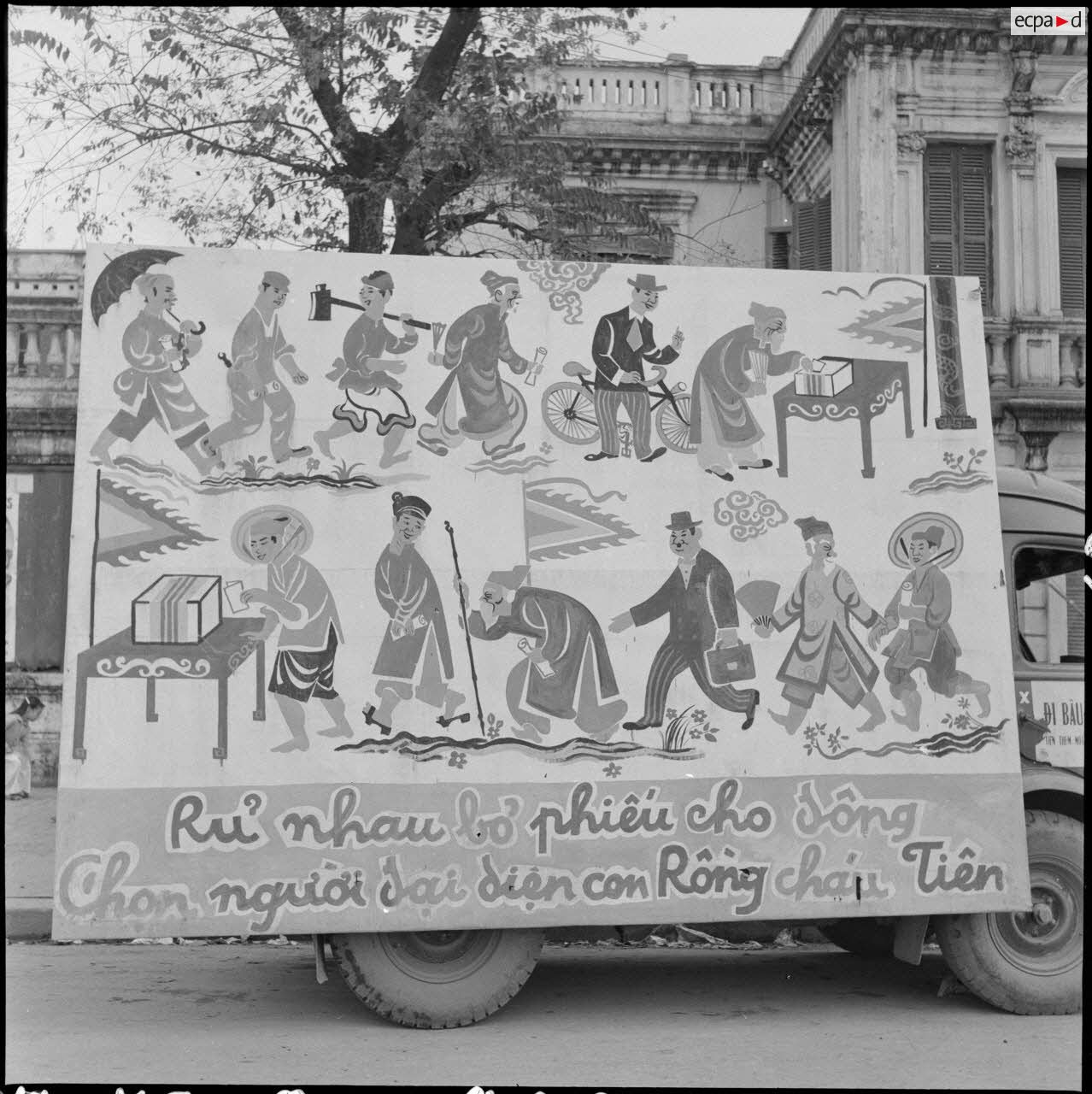
Affiche for the 1953 municipal election in Hanoi

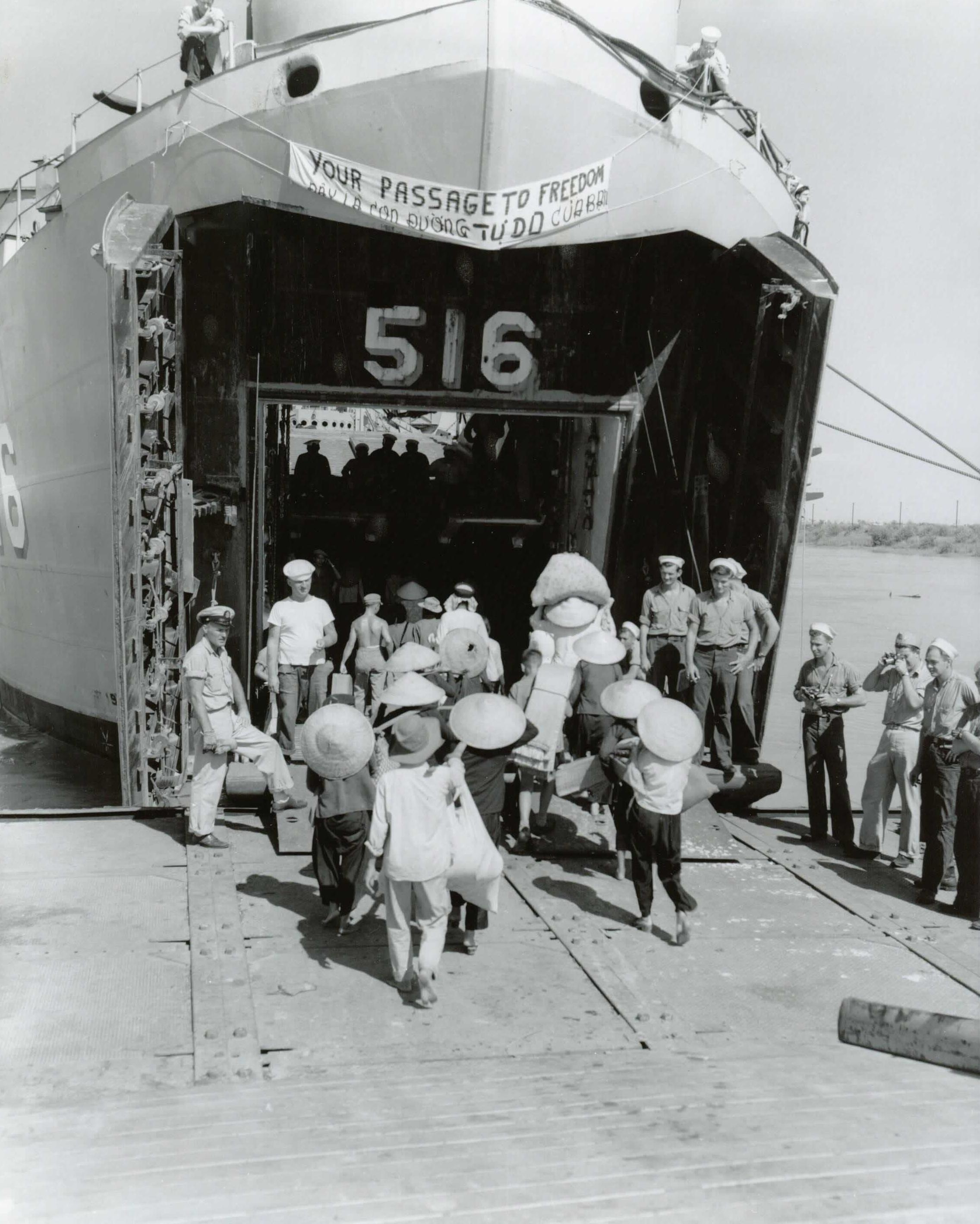
Nearly one million refugees fled communist North Vietnam during the Great Migration.

The State of Vietnam withdrew from the French Union on July 20, 1954. The next day, France and the Viet Minh agreed at the Geneva Conference that Vietnam would be temporarily divided at 17th parallel north and the State of Vietnam would rule the territory south of the 17th parallel, pending unification on the basis of supervised elections in 1956. The State of Vietnam and the United States were firmly opposed to the final settlement at Geneva and the division of Vietnam. During the transitional period of relocation, about one million people moved South through the US-backed Operation Passage to Freedom or by their own means. Both the Viet Minh and American leaders did not anticipate such a large exodus of refugees. At least 500,000 Catholics sailed South for various reasons, many driven by fears of religious persecution in the North. There were about 200,000 Buddhists who moved South with their main leaders, along with tens of thousands among ethnic minority groups, including urban Chinese, rural Chinese Nùng, Mường, Thảy, Tày, Mán, and Mèo.

Consolidations in the South

A significant factor in shaping the anticommunist critique in South Vietnam came from the influx of educated Northern émigrés (Bắc di cư). Among them, most of the notable political and cultural voices were non-Catholic. They condemned both the communists and the French colonialists for the partition of Vietnam. Government and private writers illustrated how the communists had betrayed true nationalists, who referred to themselves as quốc gia. They lamented that communism had corrupted the natural goodness of humanity and disrupted the traditional harmony of Vietnamese society, while the increasing radicalisation of the communist Viet Minh had come to hijack the struggle for independence. About 90,000 Việt Minh were evacuated to the North while 5,000 to 10,000 cadre remained in the South, most of them with orders to refocus on political activity and agitation. The Saigon-Cholon Peace Committee, the first Viet Cong front, was founded in 1954 to provide leadership for this group.

As Saigon's delegation did not sign the Geneva Accords, they claimed that the State of Vietnam was not bound by it, and that the communist government in the North created conditions that made a fair election impossible in that region. In July 1955, Prime Minister Ngo Dinh Diem announced in a broadcast that South Vietnam would not participate in the elections specified in the Geneva Accords, asserting that elections held under communist rule in North Vietnam would not be free. US Secretary of State John Foster Dulles stated that, under conditions of free elections, the communists would not win.

=== First Republic (1955–1963) ===
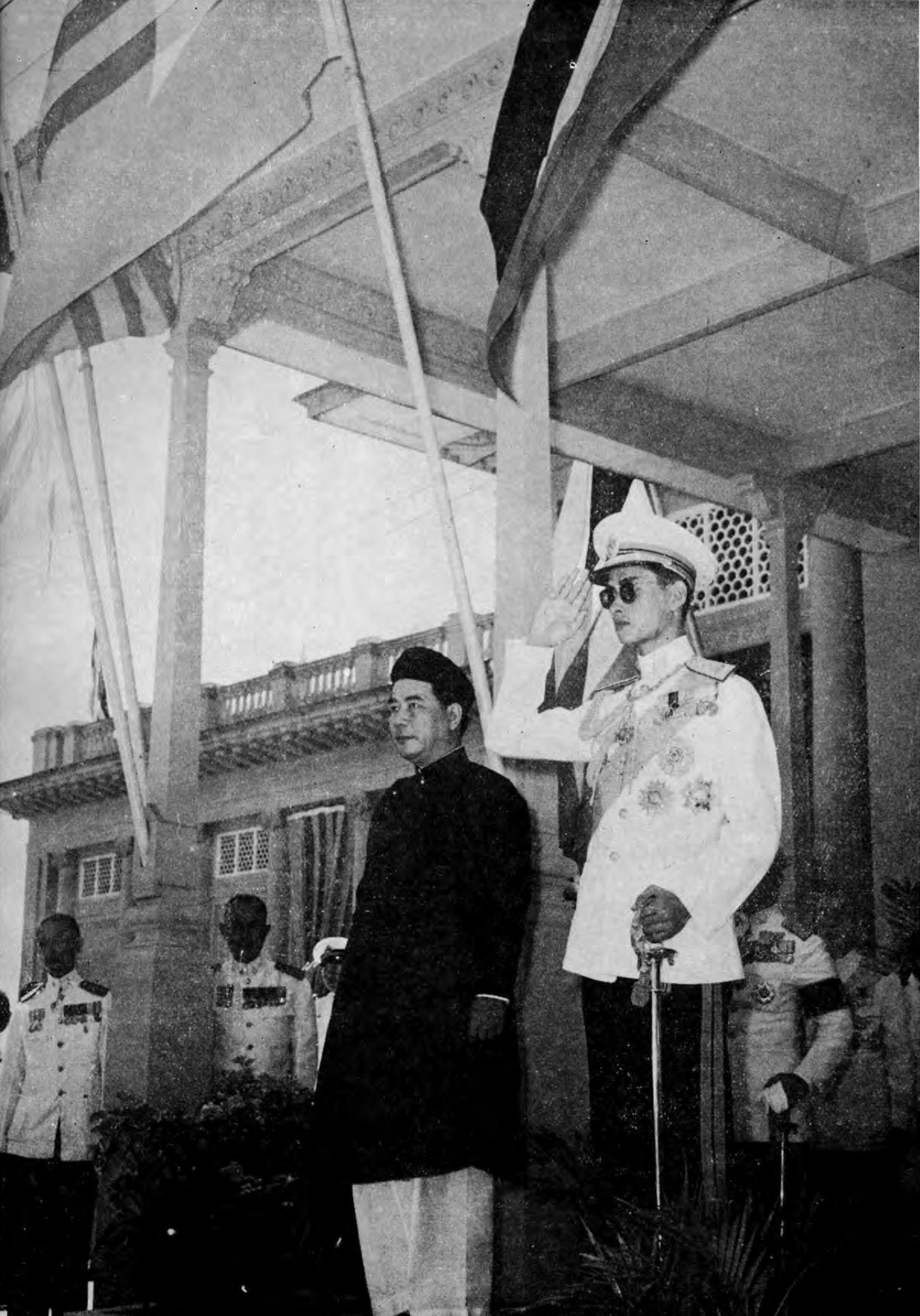
President Diem welcomed by King Bhumibol Adulyadej of Thailand, Bangkok 1957.

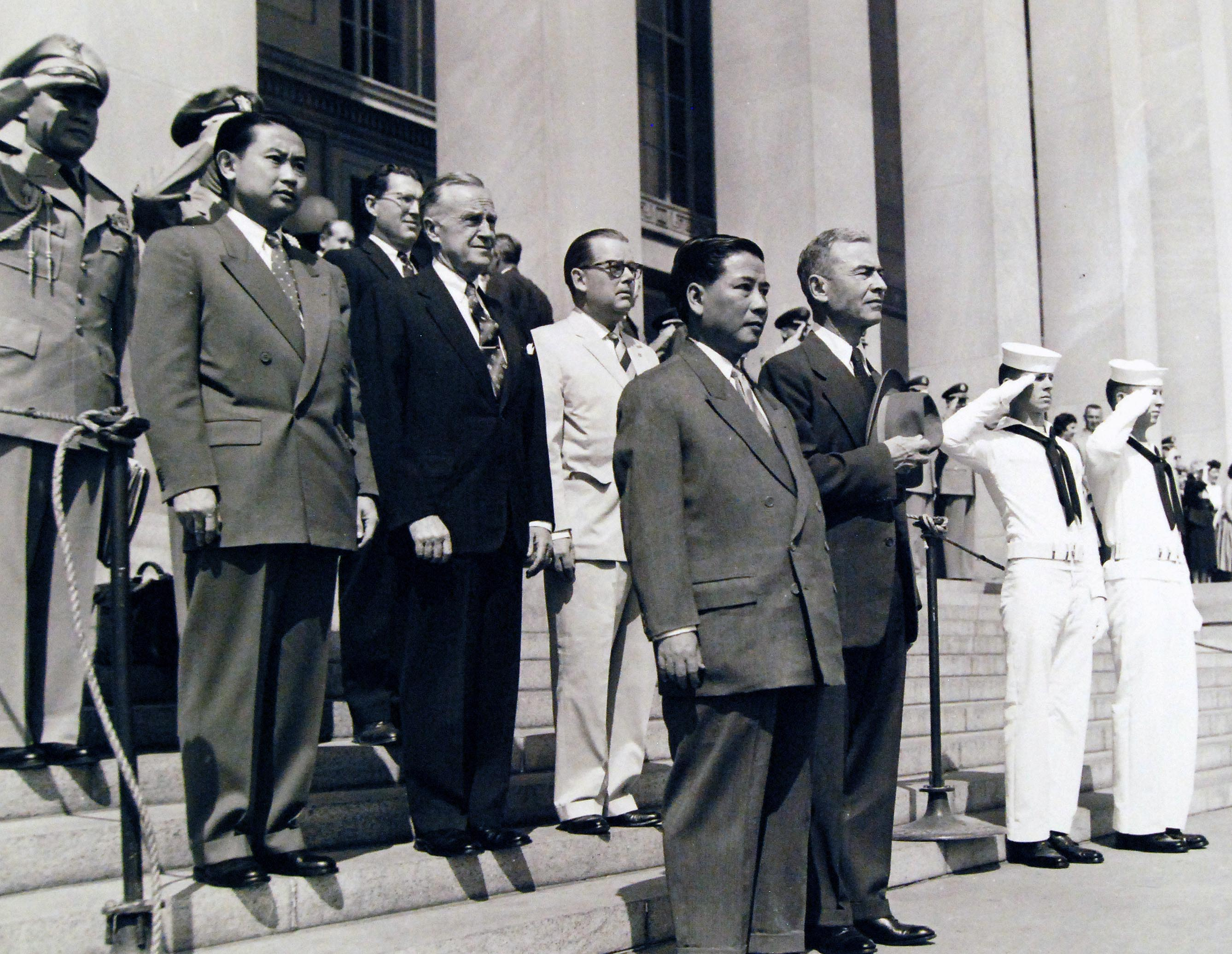
President Diem and US Deputy Secretary of Defense Donald A. Quarles review the honor guard at the Pentagon, Virginia 1957.

Dennis J. Duncanson described the circumstances prevailing in 1955 and 1956 as "anarchy among sects and of the retiring Việt Minh in the South, the 1956 campaign of terror from Hanoi's land reform and resultant peasant uprising around Vinh in the North". Diệm held a referendum on 23 October 1955 to determine the future political system of the country. He asked voters to approve a republic, thus removing Bảo Đại as head of state. The poll was supervised by his younger brother, Ngô Đình Nhu. Diệm was credited with 98 percent of the votes. In many districts, there were more votes to remove Bảo Đại than there were registered voters (e.g., in Saigon, 133% of the registered population reportedly voted to remove Bảo Đại). His American advisors had recommended a more modest winning margin of "60 to 70 percent". Diệm, however, viewed the election as a test of authority. On 26 October 1955, Diệm declared himself the president of the newly proclaimed Republic of Vietnam.

Despite significant challenges, the Republic's first five years had relative political stability, improved security, smooth economic transition from French control, and efforts to develop a postcolonial Vietnamese national identity through cultural and educational progress. In December 1955, Diệm's South Vietnam ended its existing economic and financial agreements with France and withdrew its representatives from the French Union Assembly. The French, who needed troops to fight in Algeria and were increasingly sidelined by the United States, completely withdrew from Vietnam by April 1956.

The Geneva Accords promised elections in 1956 to determine a national government for a united Vietnam. In 1957, independent observers from India, Poland, and Canada representing the International Control Commission (ICC) stated that fair, unbiased elections were not possible, reporting that neither South nor North Vietnam had honored the armistice agreement: "The elections were not held. South Vietnam, which had not signed the Geneva Accords, did not believe the Communists in North Vietnam would allow a fair election. In January 1957, the ICC agreed with this perception, reporting that neither South nor North Vietnam had honored the armistice agreement. With the French gone, a return to the traditional power struggle between north and south had begun again."

In October 1956 Diệm, with US prodding, launched a land reform program restricting rice farm sizes to a maximum of 247 acres per landowner with the excess land to be sold to landless peasants. More than 1.8m acres of farm land would become available for purchase, the US would pay the landowners and receive payment from the purchasers over a six-year period. Land reform was regarded by the US as a crucial step to build support for the nascent South Vietnamese government and undermine communist propaganda.

The North Vietnamese Communist Party approved a "people's war" on the South at a session in January 1959 and this decision was confirmed by the Politburo in March. In May 1959, Group 559 was established to maintain and upgrade the Ho Chi Minh trail, at this time a six-month mountain trek through Laos. About 500 of the "regroupees" of 1954 were sent south on the trail during its first year of operation.

Diệm attempted to stabilise South Vietnam by defending against Việt Cộng activities. He launched an anti-communist denunciation campaign (Tố Cộng) against the Việt Cộng and military campaigns against three armed groups (known then as "sects") – the Cao Đài, the Hòa Hảo, and the Bình Xuyên organised crime syndicate whose military strength combined amounted to approximately 350,000 fighters.

By 1960 the land reform process had stalled. Diệm had never truly supported reform because many of his biggest supporters were the country's largest landowners. While the US threatened to cut aid unless land reform and other changes were made, Diệm correctly assessed that the US was bluffing.

Throughout this period, the level of US aid and political support increased. In spite of this, a 1961 US intelligence estimate reported that "one-half of the entire rural region south and southwest of Saigon, as well as some areas to the north, are under considerable Communist control. Some of these areas are in effect denied to all government authority not immediately backed by substantial armed force. The Việt Cộng's strength encircles Saigon and has recently begun to move closer in the city." The report, later excerpted in The Pentagon Papers, continued: "Many feel that [Diem] is unable to rally the people in the fight against the Communists because of his reliance on virtual one-man rule, his tolerance of corruption extending even to his immediate entourage, and his refusal to relax a rigid system of public controls."

During 1962, North Vietnam intensified its war efforts by infiltrating military personnel and materiel into South Vietnam. Meanwhile, Beijing, following the Sino-Soviet split and rejecting Moscow's policy of "peaceful coexistence" with the West, backed Hanoi's escalation by providing the Viet Cong with vital small arms and heavier weaponry.

=== Military juntas (1963–1967) ===
The Diệm government lost support among the populace, and from the Kennedy administration, due to its mishandling of Buddhist activists and military defeats by the Viet Cong. Notably, the Huế Phật Đản shootings of 8 May 1963 led to the Buddhist crisis, provoking protests and civil resistance. The situation came to a head when the Special Forces were sent to raid Buddhist temples across the country, leaving a death toll estimated to be in the hundreds. Diệm was overthrown in a coup on 1 November 1963 with the tacit approval of the US.

Diệm's removal and assassination set off a period of political instability and declining legitimacy of the Saigon government. General Dương Văn Minh became president, but he was ousted in January 1964 by General Nguyễn Khánh. Phan Khắc Sửu was named head of state, but power remained with a junta of generals led by Khánh, which soon fell to infighting. Meanwhile, the Gulf of Tonkin incident of 2 August 1964 led to a dramatic increase in direct American participation in the war, with nearly 200,000 troops deployed by the end of the year. Khánh sought to capitalize on the crisis with the Vũng Tàu Charter, a new constitution that would have curtailed civil liberties and concentrated his power, but was forced to back down in the face of widespread protests and strikes. Coup attempts followed in September and February 1965, the latter resulting in Air Marshal Nguyễn Cao Kỳ becoming prime minister and General Nguyễn Văn Thiệu becoming nominal head of state.

=== Second Republic (1967–1975) ===
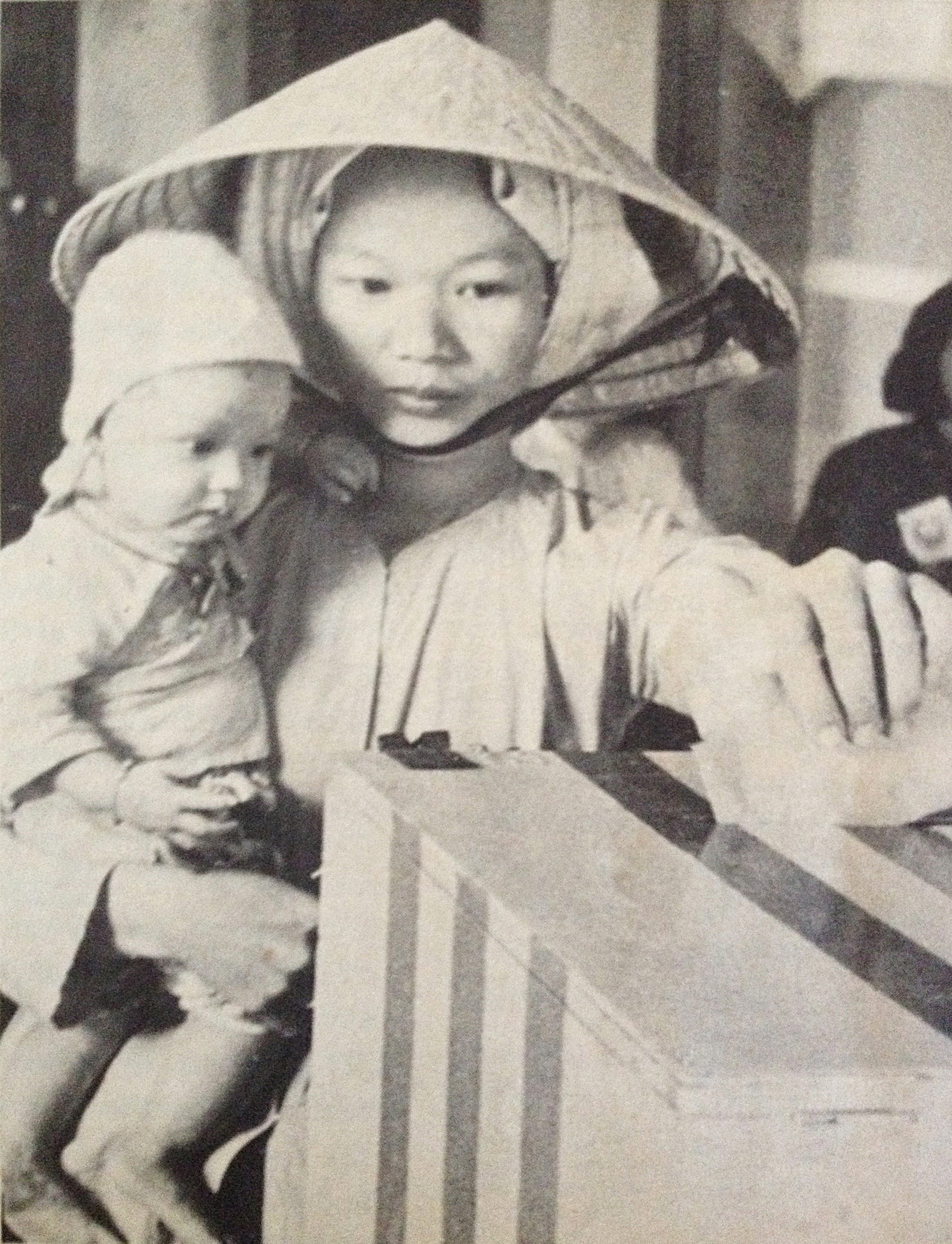
A woman casting her ballot in the 1967 elections

Kỳ and Thiệu functioned in those roles until 1967, bringing much-desired stability to the government. They intensified anticommunist efforts and occasionally imposed censorship. Under pressure from the US, they held elections for president and the legislature in 1967. The Senate election took place on 2 September 1967. The Presidential election took place on 3 September 1967, Thiệu was elected president with 34% of the vote in a widely criticised poll. The Parliamentary election took place on 22 October 1967.

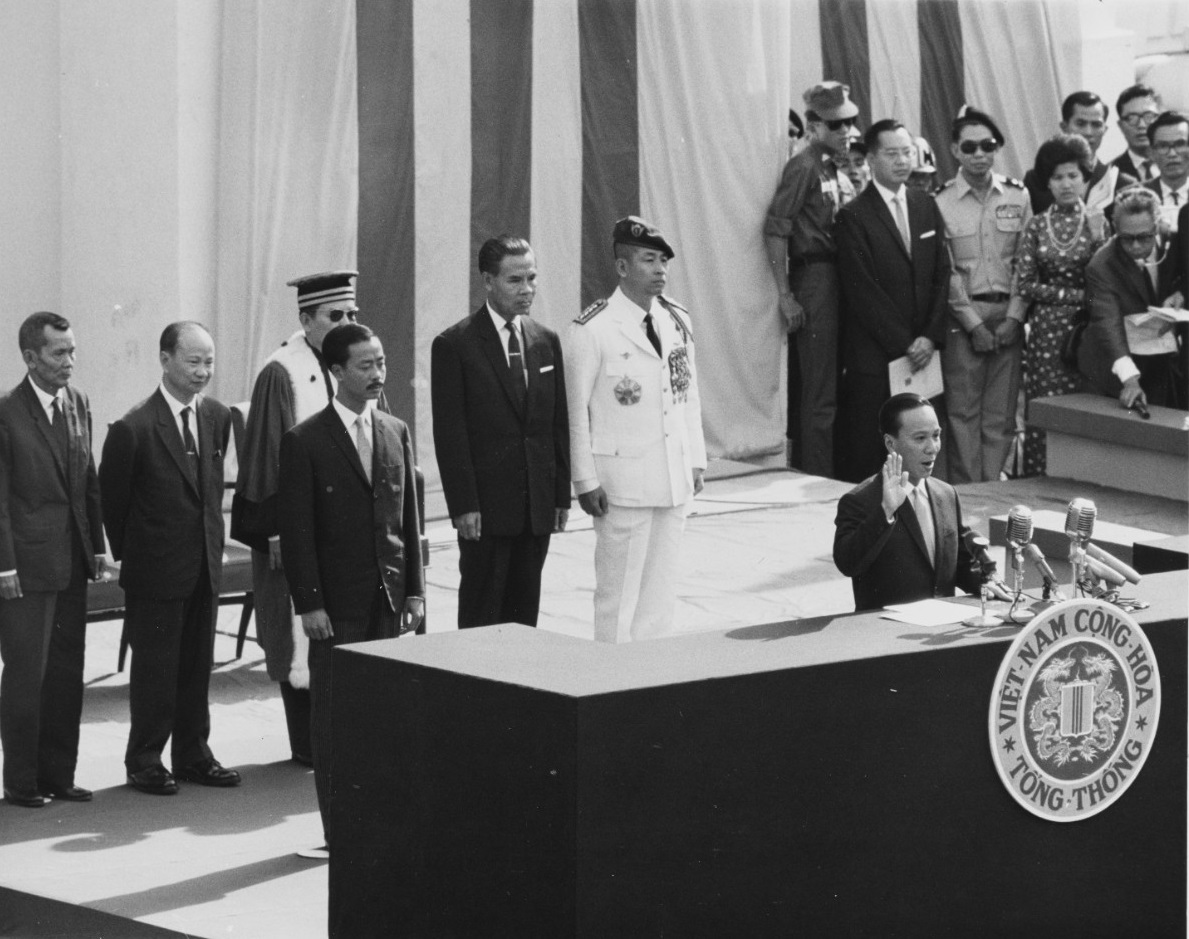
Nguyễn Văn Thiệu takes oath of office as president, October 1967

On 31 January 1968, the People's Army of Vietnam (PAVN) and the Việt Cộng broke the traditional truce accompanying the Tết (Lunar New Year) holiday. The Tet Offensive failed to spark a national uprising and was militarily disastrous. By bringing the war to South Vietnam's cities, however, and by demonstrating the continued strength of communist forces, it marked a turning point in US support for the government in South Vietnam. The new administration of Richard Nixon introduced a policy of Vietnamization to reduce US combat involvement and began negotiations with the North Vietnamese to end the war. Thiệu used the aftermath of the Tet Offensive to sideline Kỳ, his chief rival.

On 26 March 1970 the government began to implement the Land-to-the-Tiller program of land reform with the US providing US$339m of the program's US$441m cost. Individual landholdings were limited to 15 hectares.

US and South Vietnamese forces launched a series of attacks on PAVN/VC bases in Cambodia in April–July 1970. South Vietnam launched an invasion of North Vietnamese bases in Laos in February/March 1971 and were defeated by the PAVN in what was widely regarded as a setback for Vietnamization.

Thiệu was reelected unopposed in the Presidential election on 2 October 1971.

North Vietnam launched a conventional invasion of South Vietnam in late March 1972 which was only finally repulsed by October with massive US air support.

==== Final years: 1973–1975 ====
In accordance with the Paris Peace Accords signed on 27 January 1973, US military forces withdrew from South Vietnam at the end of March 1973 while PAVN forces in the South were permitted to remain in place.

North Vietnamese leaders had expected that the ceasefire terms would favour their side. As Saigon began to roll back the Việt Cộng, they found it necessary to adopt a new strategy, hammered out at a series of meetings in Hanoi in March 1973, according to the memoirs of Trần Văn Trà. As the Việt Cộng's top commander, Trà participated in several of these meetings. A plan to improve logistics was prepared so that the PAVN would be able to launch a massive invasion of the South, projected for 1976. A fuel pipeline would be built from North Vietnam to the Việt Cộng provisional capital in Lộc Ninh, about 60 mi (97 km) north of Saigon.

On 15 March 1973, Nixon implied that the US would intervene militarily if the communist side violated the ceasefire. Public reaction was unfavorable, and on 4 June 1973 the US Senate passed the Case–Church Amendment to prohibit such intervention. The oil price shock of October 1973 caused significant damage to the South Vietnamese economy. A spokesman for Thiệu admitted in a TV interview that the government was being "overwhelmed" by the inflation caused by the oil shock, while an American businessman living in Saigon stated after the oil shock that attempting to make money in South Vietnam was "like making love to a corpse". One consequence of the inflation was the South Vietnamese government had increasing difficulty in paying its soldiers and imposed restrictions on fuel and munition usage.

After two clashes that left 55 South Vietnamese soldiers dead, President Thiệu announced on 4 January 1974 that the war had restarted and that the Paris Peace Accord was no longer in effect. There were over 25,000 South Vietnamese casualties during the ceasefire period. The same month, China attacked South Vietnamese forces in the Paracel Islands, taking control of the islands.

In August 1974, Nixon was forced to resign as a result of the Watergate scandal, and the US Congress voted to reduce assistance to South Vietnam from $1 billion a year to $700 million. By this time, the Ho Chi Minh trail, once an arduous mountain trek, had been upgraded into a drivable highway with gasoline stations.

In December 1974, the PAVN launched an invasion at Phuoc Long to test the South Vietnamese combat strength and political will and whether the US would respond militarily. With no US military assistance forthcoming, the ARVN were unable to hold and the PAVN successfully captured many of the districts around the provincial capital of Phuoc Long, weakening ARVN resistance in stronghold areas. President Thiệu later abandoned Phuoc Long in early January 1975. As a result, Phuoc Long was the first provincial capital to fall to the PAVN.

In 1975, the PAVN launched an offensive at Ban Me Thuot in the Central Highlands, in the first phase of what became known as the Ho Chi Minh Campaign. The South Vietnamese unsuccessfully attempted a defence and counterattack but had few reserve forces, as well as a shortage of spare parts and ammunition. As a consequence, Thiệu ordered a withdrawal of key army units from the Central Highlands, which exacerbated an already perilous military situation and undermined the confidence of the ARVN soldiers in their leadership. The retreat became a rout exacerbated by poor planning and conflicting orders from Thiệu. PAVN forces also attacked south and from sanctuaries in Laos and Cambodia capturing Huế and Da Nang and advanced southwards. As the military situation deteriorated, ARVN troops began deserting. By early April, the PAVN had overrun almost 3/5th of the South.

Thiệu requested aid from US President Gerald Ford, but the US Senate would not release extra money to provide aid to South Vietnam, and had already passed laws to prevent further involvement in Vietnam. In desperation, Thiệu recalled Kỳ from retirement as a military commander, but resisted calls to name his old rival prime minister.

==== Fall of Saigon: April 1975 ====
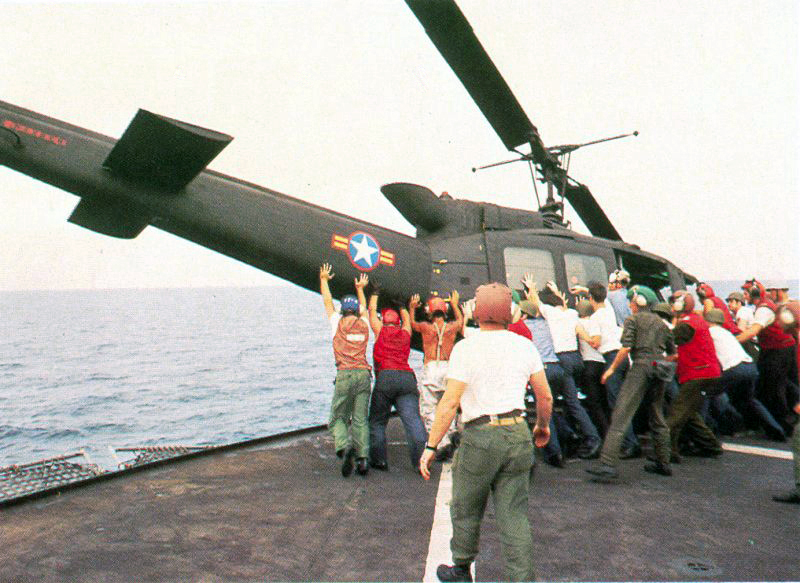
An empty Huey helicopter is jettisoned over the side of a carrier to provide room on the ship's deck for more evacuees to land.

Morale was low in South Vietnam as the PAVN advanced. A last-ditch defense was made by the ARVN 18th Division at the Battle of Xuân Lộc from 9–21 April. Thiệu resigned on 21 April 1975, and fled to Taiwan. He nominated his Vice President Trần Văn Hương as his successor. After only one week in office, the South Vietnamese national assembly voted to hand over the presidency to General Dương Văn Minh. Minh was seen as a more conciliatory figure toward the North, and it was hoped he might be able to negotiate a more favourable settlement to end the war. The North, however, was not interested in negotiations, and its forces captured Saigon. Minh unconditionally surrendered Saigon and the rest of South Vietnam to North Vietnam on 30 April 1975.

During the hours leading up to the surrender, the United States undertook a massive evacuation of US government personnel as well as high-ranking members of the ARVN and other South Vietnamese who were seen as potential targets for persecution by the Communists. Many of the evacuees were taken directly by helicopter to multiple aircraft carriers waiting off the coast.

=== Provisional Revolutionary Government ===
Following the surrender of Saigon to North Vietnamese forces on 30 April 1975, the Provisional Revolutionary Government of the Republic of South Vietnam officially became the government of South Vietnam, which merged with the Democratic Republic of Vietnam to create the Socialist Republic of Vietnam on 2 July 1976.

== Geography ==
South Vietnam was bordered by North Vietnam to the north, Laos to the northwest, Cambodia to the southwest, and Thailand across the Gulf of Thailand to the southwest. The South was divided into coastal lowlands, the mountainous Central Highlands (Cao-nguyên Trung-phần), and the Mekong Delta. South Vietnam's time zone was one hour ahead of North Vietnam, belonging to the UTC+08 time zone with the same time as the Philippines, Brunei, Malaysia, Singapore, China, Taiwan, and Western Australia.

Apart from the mainland, the Republic of Vietnam also administered parts of the Paracels and Spratly Islands. China seized control of the Paracels in 1974 after the South Vietnamese navy attempted an assault on PRC-claimed islands.

== Government, politics, and civil society ==
South Vietnam, as a unitary and centralized state, went through many political changes during its existence. Domestic politics in the Republic of Vietnam underwent a turbulent wartime evolution, shifting from authoritarianism under the ideology of personalism (1955–1963) to fractious military juntas (1963–1967) and eventually to the dynamic Second Republic (1967–1975). Described by K. W. Taylor as "a relatively stable experiment in parliamentary democracy" in an introduction to the essays by South Vietnamese officials, the Second Republic was a hybrid regime that was more democratic than previous governments. Its diverse socio-political groups were characterized by "a deep yearning for peace, a sense of civic responsibility, the pursuit of intellectual and artistic freedom, and an overall critical attitude toward the government".

Bảo Đại served as Chief of State when Vietnam was divided in 1954, but he and his circle were labelled by the Diệm regime as "feudalistic" and collaborators with the French. In 1955, Prime Minister Ngô Đình Diệm held a referendum to decide whether the State of Vietnam would remain a monarchy or become a republic. This referendum indended as a "coup" was rigged in favor of a republic headed by Diệm. Not only did an implausible 98% vote in favor of deposing Bảo Đại, but over 380,000 more votes were cast than the total number of registered voters; in Saigon, for instance, Diệm was credited with 133% of the vote. Diệm proclaimed himself the president of the newly formed Republic of Vietnam. The removal of Bảo Đại renewed debate over the constitutional process, revealing differing views among anticommunist nationalists regarding democracy and authoritarianism. The Diệm faction supported a highly authoritarian hybrid regime; the Southern "sect" parties (associated with the Hòa Hảo and the Cao Đài) favored a more liberal and pluralistic hybrid regime; while Northern émigré Phan Quang Đán advocated a robust democracy with only minor regulations. Using the gained dictatorial powers, Diệm gave the key government positions to his family members, with his younger brother Ngô Đình Nhu becoming most prominent as he gained authority over military, police and intelligence matters, and adopted Personalism, a doctrine which posed itself as a third way "between Marxist collectivism and Western individualistic capitalism", as the official ideology of the regime.

Diệm and his supporters in theory agreed that the Republic of Vietnam needed democratization and anticommunist unity, but his conception of democracy differed vastly from the one of his opponents. First of all, for Diem, drawing on Personalism, democracy began with improving economic conditions and only later political liberalization: he argued that most Vietnamese were too poor to fully exercise political freedom. This implicitly justified short-term authoritarianism while delaying political liberalization to a distant future. Thus, Diem promised to build a "substructure for democracy" without naming a date when he would grant political democracy. Diem also believed that it would be needed to "teach" the Vietnamese "to be democratic" and expected an unconditional obedience for the period of his supposedly short-term authoritarianism. Secondly, for Diem, the very concept of 'democracy' did not match the Western idea of it. He contrasted the "political democracies" founded in the 18th and the 19th centuries on the principles of "individualism and economic liberalism" and modern representative governments to the "tendency" based on Personalism. Ngô Đình Nhu argued against "formal and liberal democracy" and "submission to the capitalist order", while advocating for "communitarian labor" and "justice based on a social plan". The lack of popular support led to the regime employing authoritarian methods to preserve power and contain and control its populace, among which was the forced relocation of peasants into "strategic hamlets." The discrepancy between the officially proclaimed 'democracy' and the dictatorship led to a popular discontent, which, in its turn, fueled the repression, reportedly employing concentration camps; thus, Diem alienated the majority of the populace.

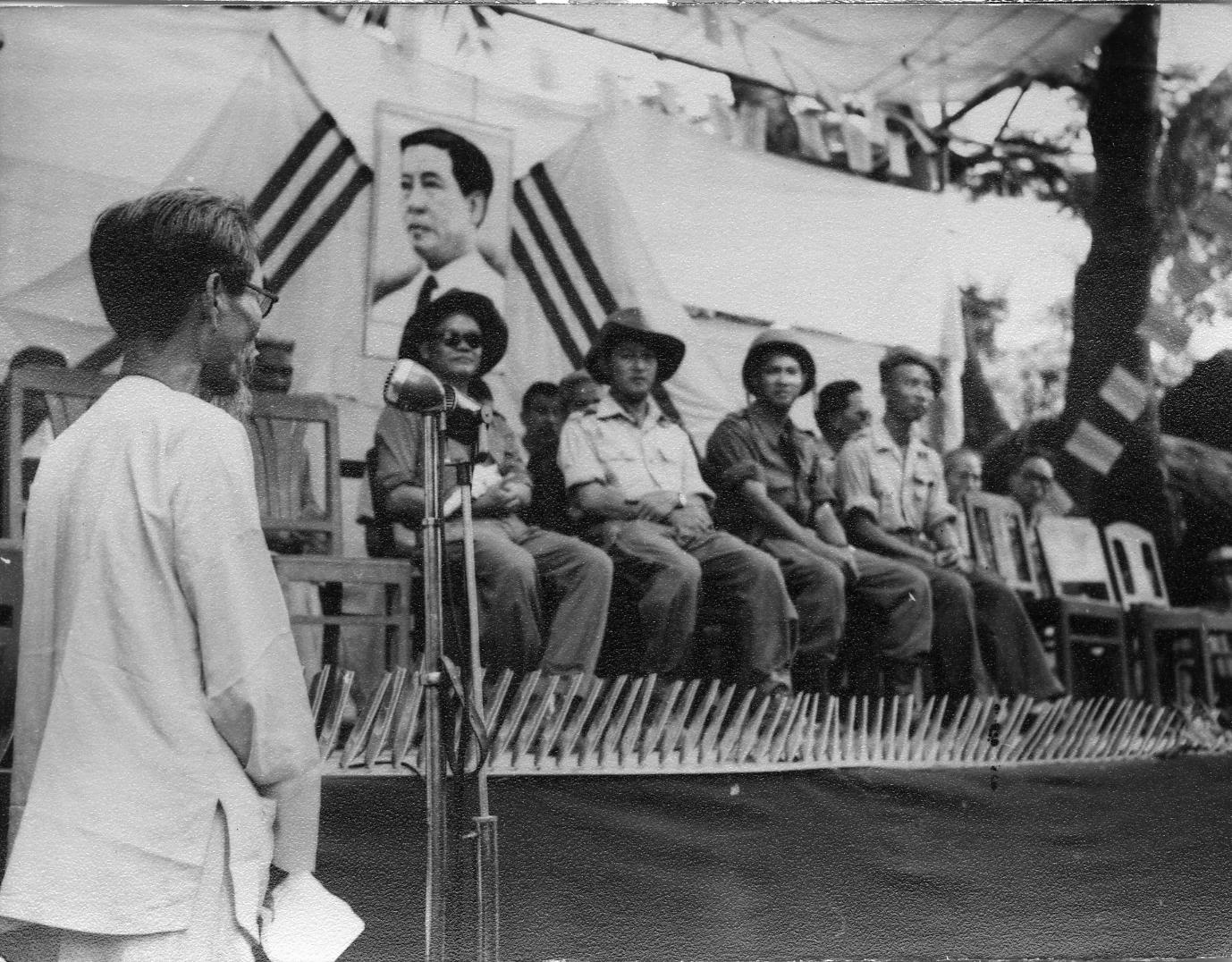
Portrait of President Ngo Dinh Diem during a pro-government demonstration in South Vietnam

Seeking to legitimize the regime, the Diệm government organized propaganda that maintained a Vietnamese national identity centered around his leadership and ideals; it was done partially through the National Revolutionary Movement (NRM), a mass political organization designed to spread Personalism and Diem's policies and suppress the subversives to the regime, as opposed to the Personalist Labor Revolutionary Party which operated entirely out of public view. During the campaigns led by the NRM, which borrowed tactics from the Viet Minh and were inspired by Vichy France, South Vietnamese officials repeated to the Vietnamese peasantry lectures given by the Ngô brothers on personalist principles of government and citizenship. In 1955, Ngo Dinh Diem launched the Ministry of Information and Youth to carry out propaganda and censorship, throughout which the Ministry sought to build a personality cult around Diem, akin to that of "Uncle Ho". The Ministry presented Diem as an "enlightened sovereign" who could improve the lot of all Vietnamese by creating "economic and social stability for all" within a Personalist framework, and constructed a public narrative of his life, focused on such episodes as his "refusal to compromise Vietnamese autonomy".

Despite U.S. representatives in Saigon reporting that Diệm government "was making no attempt to cultivate a base of popular support" and "regularly ordered the execution of political opponents, shut down dissident newspapers, and violated every article in South Vietnam's constitution", the U. S. policymakers supported it and believed that the "childlike and primitive" nature of Vietnamese people "required authoritarian government if they were to be kept out of the communist bloc." With the support of US government and the CIA, ARVN officers led by General Dương Văn Minh staged a coup in 1963 that killed Diệm. The military held a brief interim military government until General Nguyễn Khánh deposed Minh in a January 1964 coup. Until late 1965, multiple coups and changes of government occurred, with some civilians being allowed to give a semblance of civil rule overseen by a military junta.

In 1965, the feuding civilian government voluntarily resigned and handed power back to the nation's military, in the hope that this would bring stability and unity to the nation. An elected constituent assembly, including representatives of all the branches of the military, decided to switch the nation's system of government to a semi-presidential system. Military rule initially failed to provide much stability; however, as internal conflicts and political inexperience caused various factions of the army to launch coups and counter-coups against one another, making leadership very tumultuous. The situation within the ranks of the military stabilised in mid-1965 when the Republic of Vietnam Air Force chief Nguyễn Cao Kỳ became Prime Minister, with General Nguyễn Văn Thiệu as the figurehead chief of state. As Prime Minister, Kỳ consolidated control of the South Vietnamese government and ruled the country with an iron fist.

In June 1965, Kỳ's influence over the ruling military government was solidified when he forced civilian prime minister Phan Huy Quát from power. Often praising aspects of Western culture in public, Ky was supported by the United States and its allied nations, though doubts began to circulate among Western officials by 1966 on whether or not Ky could maintain stability in South Vietnam. A repressive leader, Ky was greatly despised by his fellow countrymen. In early 1966, protesters influenced by popular Buddhist monk Thích Trí Quang attempted an uprising in Quang's hometown of Da Nang. The uprising was unsuccessful and Ky's repressive stance towards the nation's Buddhist population continued. In 1967, Kỳ decided to form a representative government and to ratify a constitution based on that of the United States and granting basic liberal democratic freedoms, like freedom of speech, press and association. The motives behind Kỳ launching democratization are unclear: there was no apparent pressure from the US to democratize; while the civil society was relatively strong, it wasn't strong enough to challenge the power of the army. Like many other army leaders, Kỳ himself did not value democracy and believed that authoritarianism was necessary for South Vietnam to survive.

In 1967, the unicameral National Assembly was replaced by a bicameral system consisting of a House of Representatives or lower house (Hạ Nghị Viện) and a Senate or upper house (Thượng Nghị Viện) and South Vietnam held its first elections under the new system. The military nominated Nguyễn Văn Thiệu as their candidate, and he was elected with a plurality of the vote. The elections are widely considered to have been fraudulent. Thiệu began consolidating power, much to the dismay of those who hoped for an era of more political openness. Nevertheless, the period following the establishing a representative system was marked by the most advanced political freedoms in the history of South Vietnam; the political freedoms were also greater than in the Marxist-Leninist system of North Vietnam. The regime was still dominated by the army, and as Thiệu consolidated power, he was becoming more dictatorial, and the regime was shifting from constitutional rule towards authoritarianism. Still, there was a republican civil society that was able to publicly oppose both the growing authoritarianism of South Vietnam and the Viet Cong; the ruling generals had to contend with the interests of the civil society in constitutional and legal methods. While the last two years of the regime are characterized with pressure on the democratic institutions, political and religious leaders were able to use the granted political freedoms to call the government to stop the war and to compete within the divided society for influence. Overall, South Vietnam in its last years has been characterized as "authoritarian enough to be unpopular, democratic enough to be inefficient."

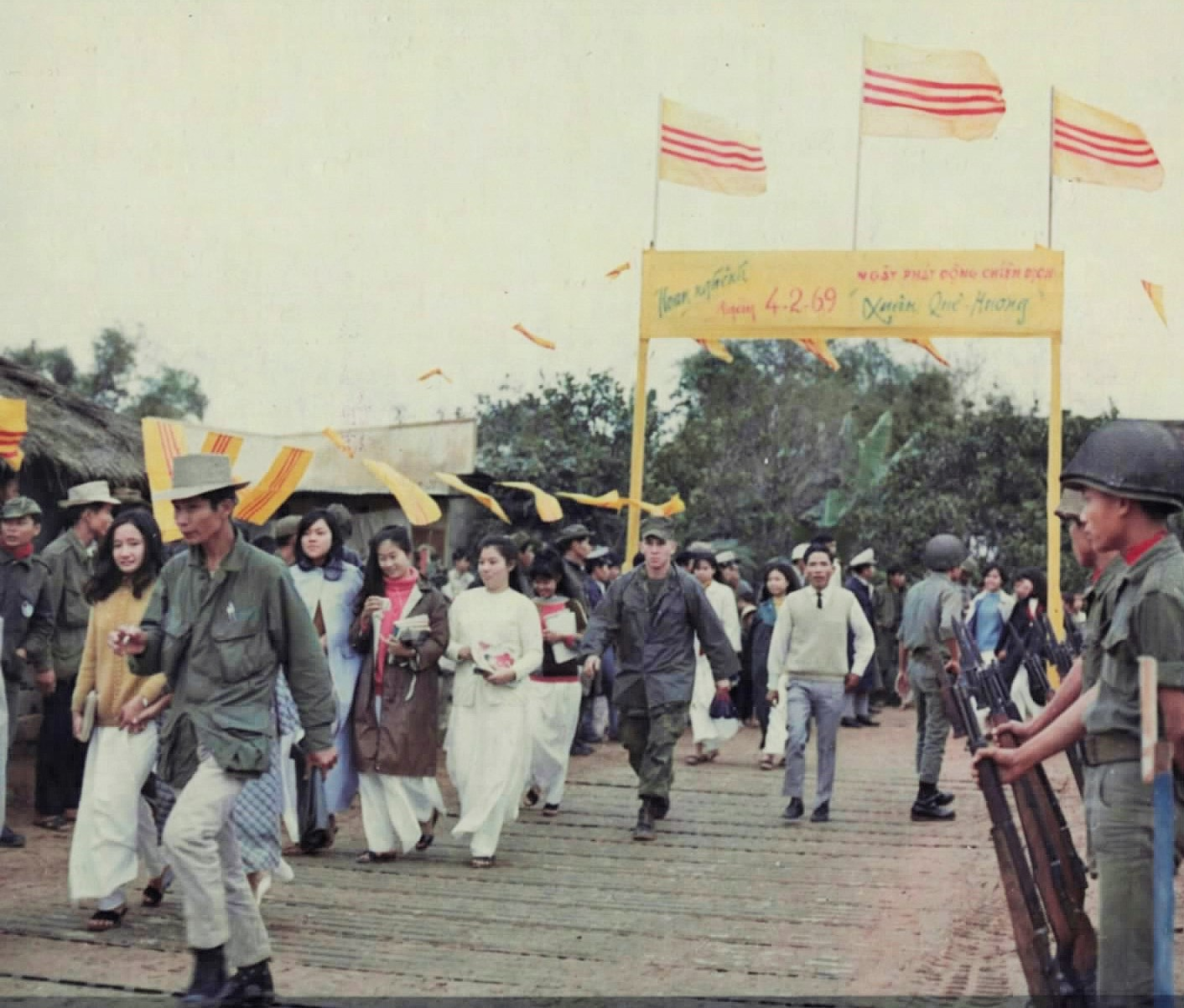
Ceremony at a Chieu Hoi center in Quang Tri, 1969

Thiệu was re-elected unopposed in 1971, receiving a suspiciously high 94% of the vote on an 87% turnout. Thiệu ruled until the final days of the war, resigning on 21 April 1975. Vice-president Trần Văn Hương assumed power for a week, but on 27 April the Parliament and Senate voted to transfer power to Dương Văn Minh, who was the nation's last president and who unconditionally surrendered to the North Vietnamese forces on 30 April 1975.

The National Assembly/House of Representatives was located in the Saigon Opera House, now the Municipal Theatre, Ho Chi Minh City, while the Senate was located at 45-47 Bến Chương Dương Street (đường Bến Chương Dương), District 1, originally the Chamber of Commerce, and now the Ho Chi Minh City Stock Exchange.

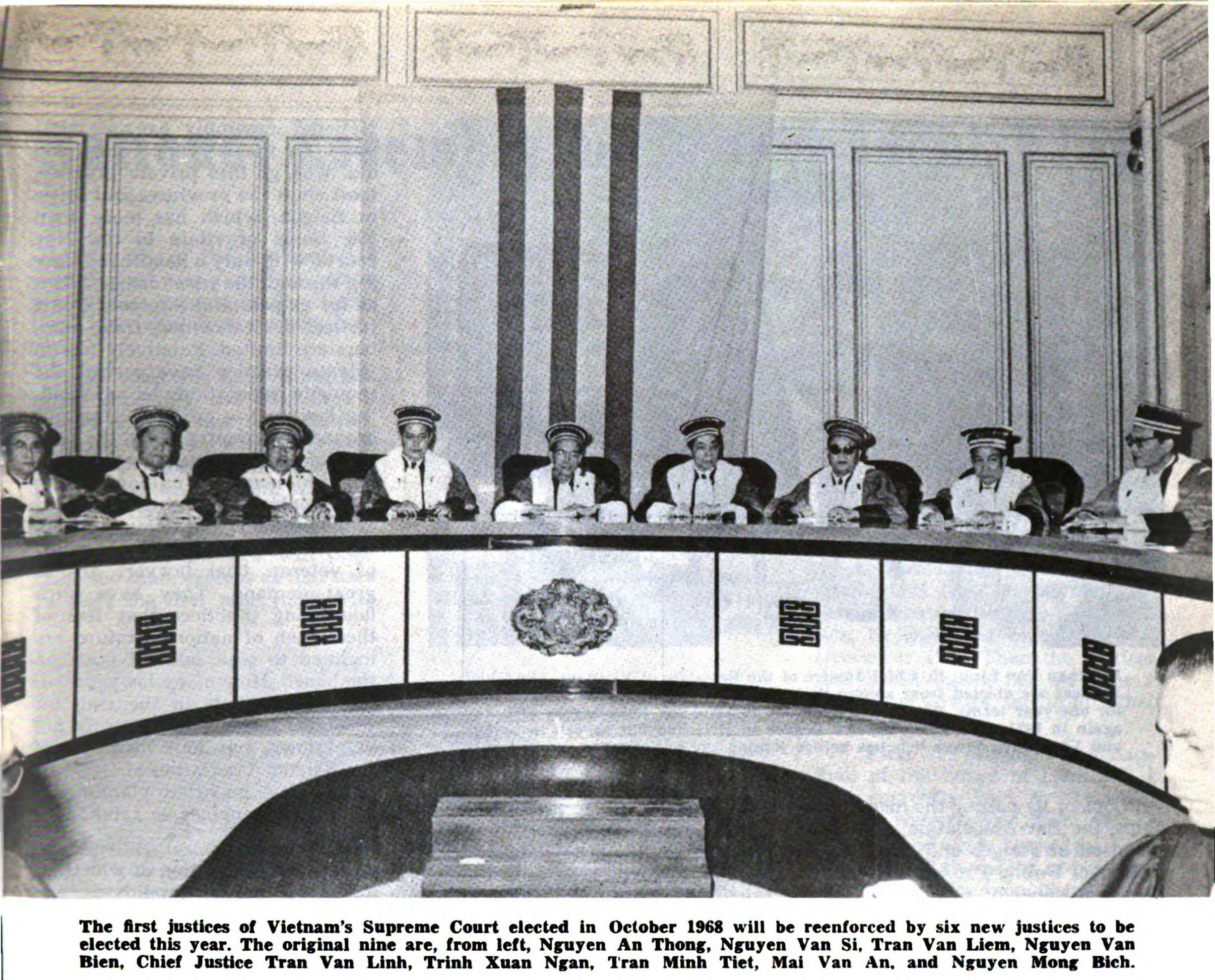
Justices of the Supreme Court, 1971

Diverse civil society forces, such as Buddhists, Catholics, and students, were fragmented, yet highly active and influential. They helped democratize the country, promote a new constitution, and organize elections in 1967. Following the promulgation of the liberal constitution and establishment of a democratic system, tensions arose between the government and the press amidst a massive communist military campaign across South Vietnam. However, repression of civil liberties in South Vietnam was arguably less severe than in other US-backed Asian countries, including Thailand, Taiwan, and South Korea. At times, the South Vietnamese government championed liberal ideas and oversaw a vibrant civil society and a lively press. During the Second Republic, South Vietnam underwent a fairly stable experiment in representative democracy. Citizens from all walks of life, including educators, journalists, politicians, entrepreneurs, administrators, lawyers, judges, military officers, and diplomats, worked to establish a constitutional system grounded in relatively open elections with an executive, a legislature, and a judiciary.

Overall, the local political and cultural dimensions of South Vietnam have been examined in the 'Vietnamese turn' scholarship of recent decades, whereas prior to the 1990s, 'orthodox' portrayals of South Vietnam from those with no knowledge of its language and society tended to focus on its negative aspects as a regime. According to recent scholarship, the critical attitude by 'orthodox' narrative fails to acknowledge that authoritarianism was connected to the brutal and prolonged wartime conditions in which South Vietnam faced the North and the insurgency. Extensive archival researches have challenged earlier representations of the South Vietnam, offering more nuanced readings of its politics, particularly regarding the diverse, multi-layered nature of nationalism in the Republic of Vietnam. As historian Peter Zinoman writes, while South Vietnam as a project was marked by authoritarianism, militarism and dependency on the US support, its another side consisted of a dynamic civil society, a productive intellectual and cultural life, and a republican political culture manifested in independent student movements, labour unions and non-government press, despite the South Vietnamese authorities "did not always respect or honor it", while such expressions were suppressed in North Vietnam. Nu-Anh Tran argues that the Republic of Vietnam was part of a broader pattern of postcolonial hybrid regimes that both embraced and limited democracy. Like other newly independent states, it struggled to balance democratic ideals with concerns about stability, efficiency, and security, issues that remain relevant nowadays.

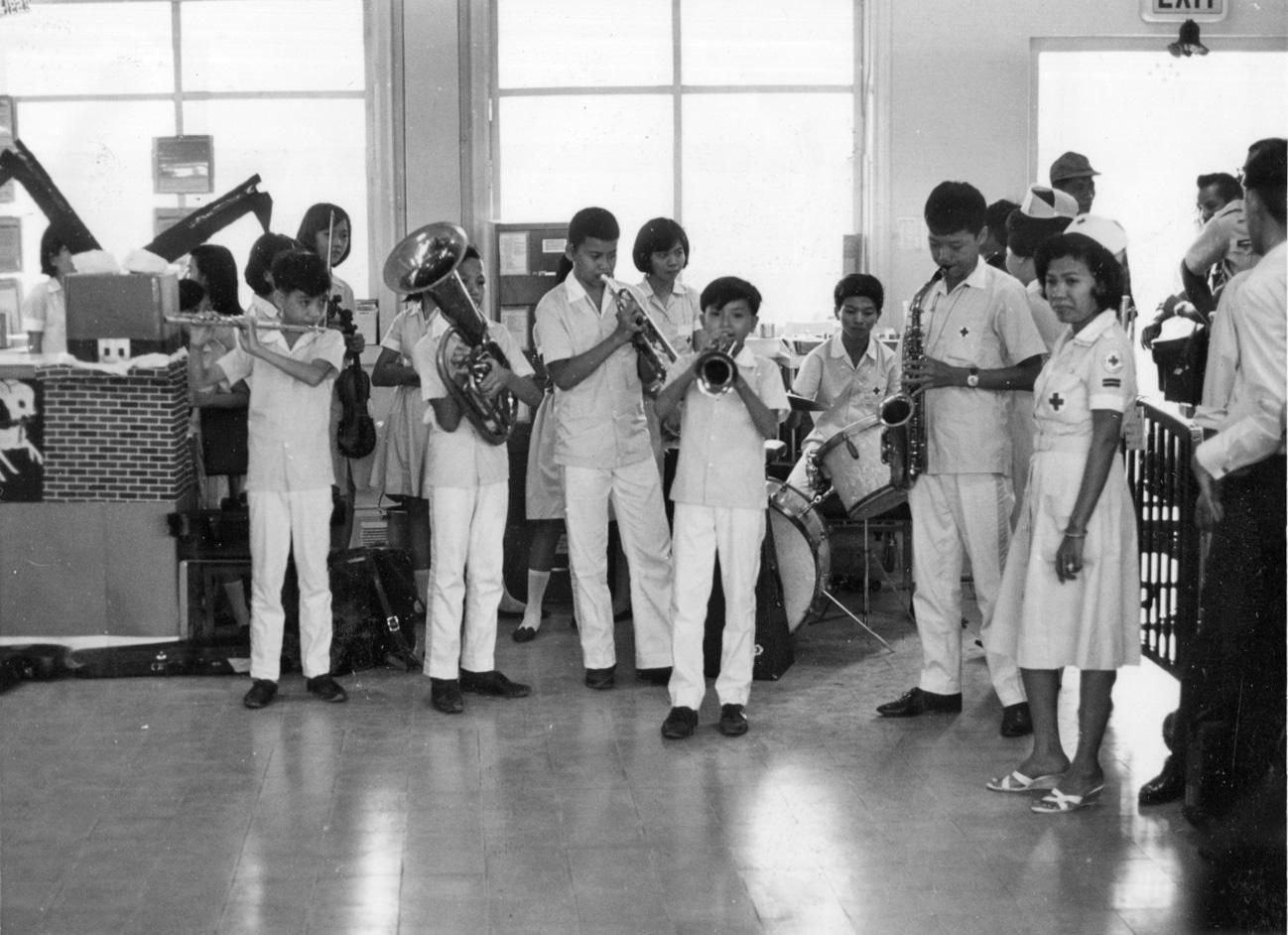
A children's orchestra of the Vietnam Red Cross in 1966

=== Human rights ===
From 1972 to 1974, Freedom House rated the level of freedom in South Vietnam at 4.5/7 points (the higher the score, the lower the level of freedom). Compared to many other regimes in the Southeast Asia region at that time, it had a higher level of freedom, democracy, and human rights than communist North Vietnam in many aspects, especially personal freedom, press, religion, and cultural activities in urban areas, only behind Malaysia. It ranked in the group of "Partly Free" countries. However, the South Vietnamese government was regularly accused of holding a large number of political prisoners, the exact number of which was a source of contention. Amnesty International, in a report in 1973, estimated the number of South Vietnam's civilian prisoners ranging from 35,257 (as confirmed by Saigon) to 200,000 or more. Among them, approximately 22,000–41,000 were accounted as "communist" political prisoners.

=== Leaders ===
- 1949–1955 State of Vietnam (Quốc gia Việt Nam). Internationally recognized in 1950. Roughly 60 percent of Vietnamese territory was controlled by the communist-led Viet Minh. However, most delta and urban areas with large populations were under the administration of the State of Vietnam. Vietnam was partitioned at the 17th parallel in 1954.
  - Bảo Đại (1949–1955). Abdicated as emperor (constitutional monarch) in 1945 following the surrender of Imperial Japanese occupying forces at the end of World War II, later serving as head of state until 1955.
- 1955–1975 Republic of Vietnam (Việt Nam Cộng Hòa). Fought in the Vietnam War (or Second Indochina War; 1959–1975) against the Government of the Democratic Republic of Vietnam in Hanoi.
  - Ngô Đình Diệm (1955–1963). Once highly lauded by America, he was ousted and assassinated in a US-backed coup in November 1963.
  - In 1963–1965, there were numerous coups and short-lived governments, several of which were headed by Dương Văn Minh or Nguyễn Khánh.
  - Nguyễn Văn Thiệu (1965–1975). Prime Minister Nguyễn Cao Kỳ was the top leader of the last of the military regimes in 1965–1967 before a US-backed civilian government was instituted, following a new constitution and elections in 1967, with Thiệu elected president.
  - Trần Văn Hương (1975)
  - Dương Văn Minh (2nd time) (1975). Surrendered South Vietnam to North Vietnam.
- 1975–76 Provisional Revolutionary Government of the Republic of South Vietnam (Chính phủ Cách mạng lâm thời Cộng hoà miền Nam Việt Nam)

- Huỳnh Tấn Phát (1975–1976)

=== Ministries ===
South Vietnam had the following Ministries:

- Ministry of Culture and Education (Bộ Văn hóa Giáo dục) at 33–5 Lê Thánh Tôn
- Ministry of Foreign Affairs (Bộ Ngoại giao) at 4–6 Rue Colombert (now 4–6 Alexandre de Rhodes)
- Ministry of Health (Bộ Y tế) at 57–9 Hồng Thập Tự (now 57-9 Nguyễn Thị Minh Khai)
- Ministry of Justice (Bộ Tư pháp) at 47 Thống Nhất (now 47 Lê Duẩn)
- Ministry of National Defence (Bộ Quốc phòng) at 63 Gia Long (now 63 Lý Tự Trọng)
- Ministry of Police (Bộ Tư lệnh Cảnh sát Quốc gia) at 258 Nguyễn Trãi
- Ministry of Public Works and Communications (Bộ Công chính và Truyền thông) at 92 Công Lý (now 92 Nam Kỳ Khởi Nghĩa)
- Ministry of Revolutionary Development

=== Administrative divisions ===
==== Provinces ====
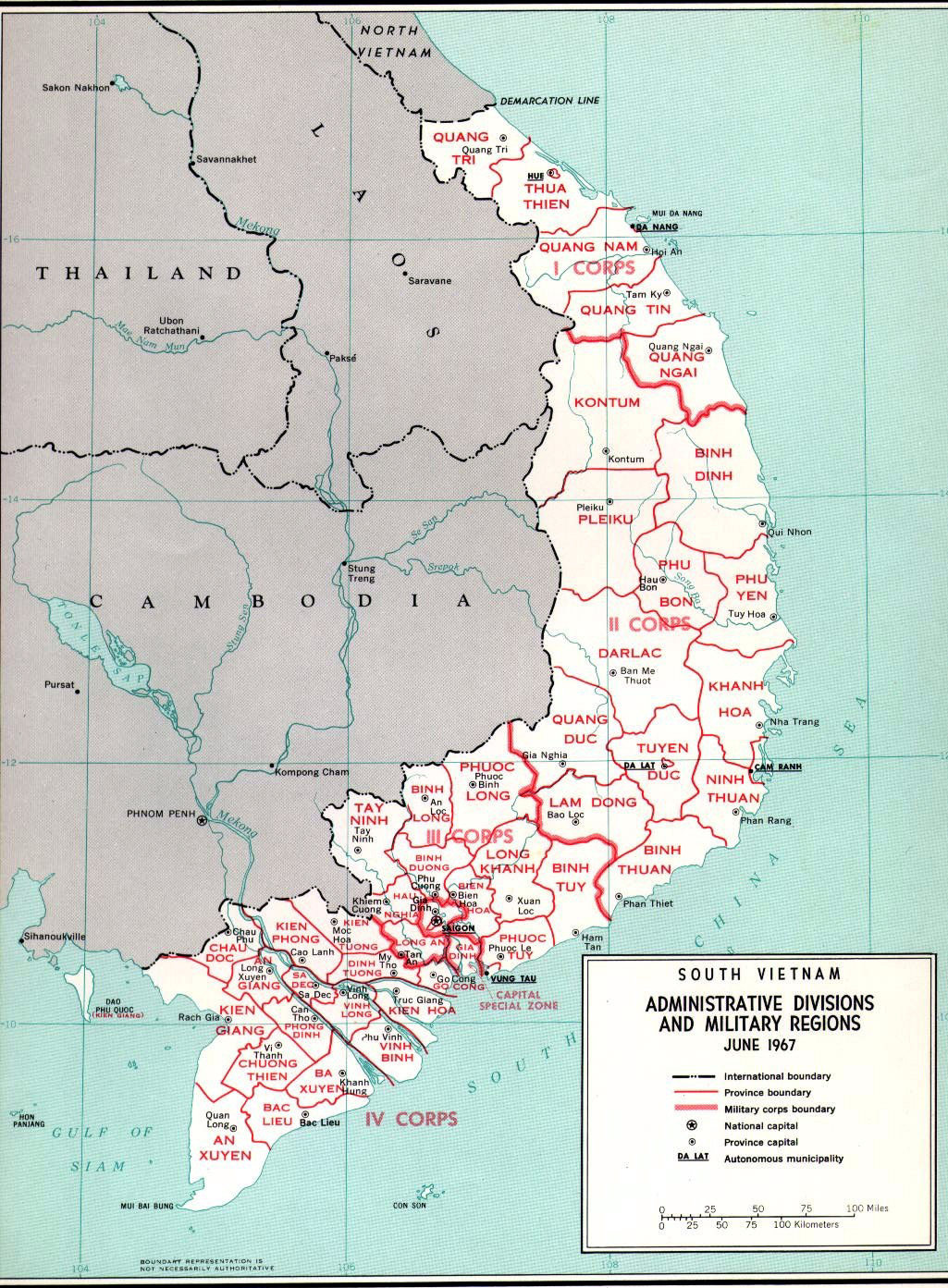
Administrative divisions and military regions of South Vietnam

South Vietnam was divided into forty-four provinces:

Name	Population (1968 est.)	Capital
Quảng Trị Province	279,088	Quảng Trị
Thừa Thiên Province	633,799	Huế
Quảng Nam Province	915,123	Hội An
Quảng Tín Province	306,518	Tam Kỳ
Quảng Ngãi Province	678,606	Quảng Ngãi
Kon Tum Province	104,241	Kontum
Bình Định Province	902,085	Qui Nhơn
Pleiku Province	192,682	Pleiku
Phú Bổn Province	51,313	Hậu Bổn
Phú Yên Province	329,464	Tuy Hòa
Darlac Province	293,194	Ban Me Thuot
Khánh Hòa Province	403,988	Nha Trang
Quảng Đức Province	28,863	Gia Nghĩa
Tuyên Đức Province	93,646	Da Lat
Ninh Thuận Province	156,194	Phan Rang
Lâm Đồng Province	65,561	Bảo Lộc
Bình Thuận Province	267,306	Phan Thiết
Phước Long Province	104,213	Phước Bình
Long Khánh Province	144,227	Xuân Lộc
Bình Tuy Province	59,082	Hàm Tân
Bình Long Province	70,394	An Lộc
Tây Ninh Province	235,404	Tây Ninh
Bình Dương Province	235,404	Phú Cường
Biên Hòa Province	449,468	Biên Hòa
Phước Tuy Province		Phước Lễ
Hậu Nghĩa Province	279,088	Khiêm Cường
Gia Định Province	1,089,773	Gia Định
Long An Province		Tân An
Gò Công Province		Gò Công
Định Tường Province		Mỹ Tho
Kiến Tường Province	42,597	Mộc Hóa
Kiến Phong Province		Cao Lãnh
Châu Đốc Province	575,916	Châu Phú
An Giang Province	491,710	Long Xuyên
Sa Đéc Province	264,511	Sa Đéc
Kiên Giang Province	387,634	Rạch Giá
Phong Dinh Province	426,090	Cần Thơ
Vĩnh Long Province	500,870	Vĩnh Long
Kiến Hòa Province	582,099	Trúc Giang
Vĩnh Bình Province	404,118	Phú Vinh
Chương Thiện Province	248,713	Vị Thanh
Ba Xuyên Province	352,971	Khánh Hưng
Bạc Liêu Province	259,891	Vĩnh Lợi
An Xuyên Province	235,398	Quản Long
Saigon	1,622,673	Saigon

==== Regions ====
Throughout its history, South Vietnam had many reforms enacted that affected the organisation of its administrative divisions.

On 24 October 1956 Diệm enacted a reform of the administrative divisions system of the Republic of Vietnam in the form of Decree 147a/NV. This decree divided the region of Trung phần into Trung nguyên Trung phần (the Central Midlands) and Cao nguyên Trung phần (the Central Highlands).

The offices of appointed representative and assistant representative of the central government were created for the region of Trung phần, the main representative had an office in Buôn Ma Thuột, while the assistant had an office in Huế.

Following the 1963 coup d'état that ousted Diệm the Central Government's Representatives in the Trung phần region were gradually replaced by the control of the Tactical zone's Commanders (Tư lệnh Vùng Chiến thuật), which replaced a civil administration with a military one. However, following the 1967 Senate election the military administration was replaced back with civilian administrators.

On 1 January 1969, during the presidency of Thiệu, Act 001/69 became effective which abolished the offices of government's representative and assistant government's representative, this was later followed on 12 May 1969 with Decree 544 – NĐ/ThT/QTCS which completely abolished the civil administration in Trung nguyên Trung phần in favour of the Tư lệnh Vùng Chiến thuật.

=== Military ===
The Republic of Vietnam Military Forces (RVNMF; Vietnamese: Quân lực Việt Nam Cộng hòa – QLVNCH), was formally established on 30 December 1955. Created out from ex-French Union Army colonial Indochinese auxiliary units (French: Supplétifs), gathered earlier in July 1951 into the French-led Vietnamese National Army – VNA (Vietnamese: Quân Đội Quốc Gia Việt Nam – QĐQGVN), Armée Nationale Vietnamiènne (ANV) in French, the armed forces of the new state consisted in the mid-1950s of ground, air, and naval branches of service, respectively:

- Army of the Republic of Vietnam (ARVN)
- Republic of Vietnam Air Force (RVNAF)
- Republic of Vietnam Navy (RVNN)
- Republic of Vietnam Marine Division (RVNMD)

Their roles were defined as follows: to protect the sovereignty of the free Vietnamese nation and that of the Republic; to maintain the political and social order and the rule of law by providing internal security; to defend the newly independent Republic of Vietnam from external (and internal) threats; and ultimately, to help reunify Vietnam.

Conscription was practiced in South Vietnam, but soldiers could also join voluntarily. However, enforcement of conscription was lax. Conscription began in 1957, initially requiring adult males aged 20 and 21 to serve for 18 months in the military. Rules would change over time in regards to military conscription.

The French ceased training the RVNMF in 1956, and training passed to American advisers who progressively restructured the military along US military lines.

The country was divided from north to south into four corps tactical zones: I Corps, II Corps, III Corps, IV Corps and the Capital Military District in and around Saigon.

At the time of signing of the Paris Peace Accords, the South Vietnamese government fielded the fourth largest military force in the world as a result of the American Enhance and Enhance Plus programs with approximately one and one-half million troops in uniform. The lack of sufficient training and dependence on the U.S. for spare parts, fuel, and ammunition caused maintenance and logistical problems. The impact of the 1973 oil crisis, a faltering economy, inflation, and reduced US aid led to a steady decline in South Vietnamese military expenditure and effectiveness.

== Foreign relations ==
International Relations of the Republic of Vietnam
Region	Nation/State
Asia (22)	Bahrain, Burma (at consulate level), Cambodia (severed 1963-1970), Republic of China, India (at consulate level), Indonesia (until 1964, at consulate level), Iran, Israel, Japan, Jordan, Republic of Korea, Kuwait, Laos (severed 1962-1964), Lebanon, Malaysia, Nepal, Philippines, Qatar, Saudi Arabia, Singapore, Thailand, Turkey
Europe (20)	Austria, Belgium, Cyprus, Denmark, France (severed 1965-1973), West Germany, Greece, Iceland, Ireland, Italy, Luxembourg, Monaco, Netherlands, Norway, Portugal, San Marino, Spain, Sweden, Switzerland, United Kingdom
Americas (25)	Argentina, Bolivia, Brazil, Canada, Chile, Colombia, Costa Rica, Dominican Republic, Ecuador, El Salvador, Grenada, Guatemala, Guyana, Haiti, Honduras, Jamaica, Mexico, Nicaragua, Panama, Paraguay, Peru, Trinidad and Tobago, United States, Uruguay, Venezuela
Africa (22)	Botswana, Central African Republic, Chad, Ethiopia, Gambia, Ghana, Ivory Coast, Kenya, Lesotho, Liberia, Malawi, Morocco, Niger, Nigeria, Rwanda, Sierra Leone, South Africa, Swaziland, Togo, Tunisia, Upper Volta, Zaire
Oceania (5)	Australia, Fiji, New Zealand, Tonga, Western Samoa

Countries that recognized the Republic of Vietnam (South Vietnam) as of August 7, 1958. South Vietnam North Vietnam Countries that officially recognized the Republic of Vietnam Countries that have implicitly recognised the RVN de jure. Countries that have recognised the RVN de facto.

During its existence, South Vietnam had diplomatic relations with Australia, Brazil, Cambodia (until 1963 and then from 1970), Canada, the Republic of China, France, Indonesia (until 1964), Iran, Japan, Laos, Malaysia, New Zealand, the Philippines, Saudi Arabia, Singapore, South Korea, Spain, Thailand, the United Kingdom, the United States, and West Germany.

=== Membership in international organisations ===
South Vietnam was a member of accT, the Asian Development Bank (ADB), the World Bank (IBRD), the International Development Association (IDA), the International Finance Corporation (IFC), the IMF, the International Telecommunications Satellite Organization (Intelsat), Interpol, the International Olympic Committee, and the League of Red Cross and Red Crescent Societies (LORCS).

South Vietnam held observer status at the United Nations General Assembly, whereas North Vietnam did not. In 1957, the UN General Assembly affirmed, for the second time, that South Vietnam was fully qualified for membership and should be admitted, yet both attempts were vetoed by the Soviet Union. As the continuator of the State of Vietnam, the Republic of Vietnam maintained membership in several specialized agencies of the United Nations, including the World Health Organization (WHO), the International Labour Organization (ILO), the Food and Agriculture Organization (FAO), the United Nations Educational, Scientific and Cultural Organization (UNESCO), the International Telecommunication Union (ITU), and the Universal Postal Union (UPU). The RVN themselves joined the International Civil Aviation Organization (ICAO), the World Meteorological Organization (WMO), and the International Atomic Energy Agency (IAEA), among others.

=== Relationship with the United States ===
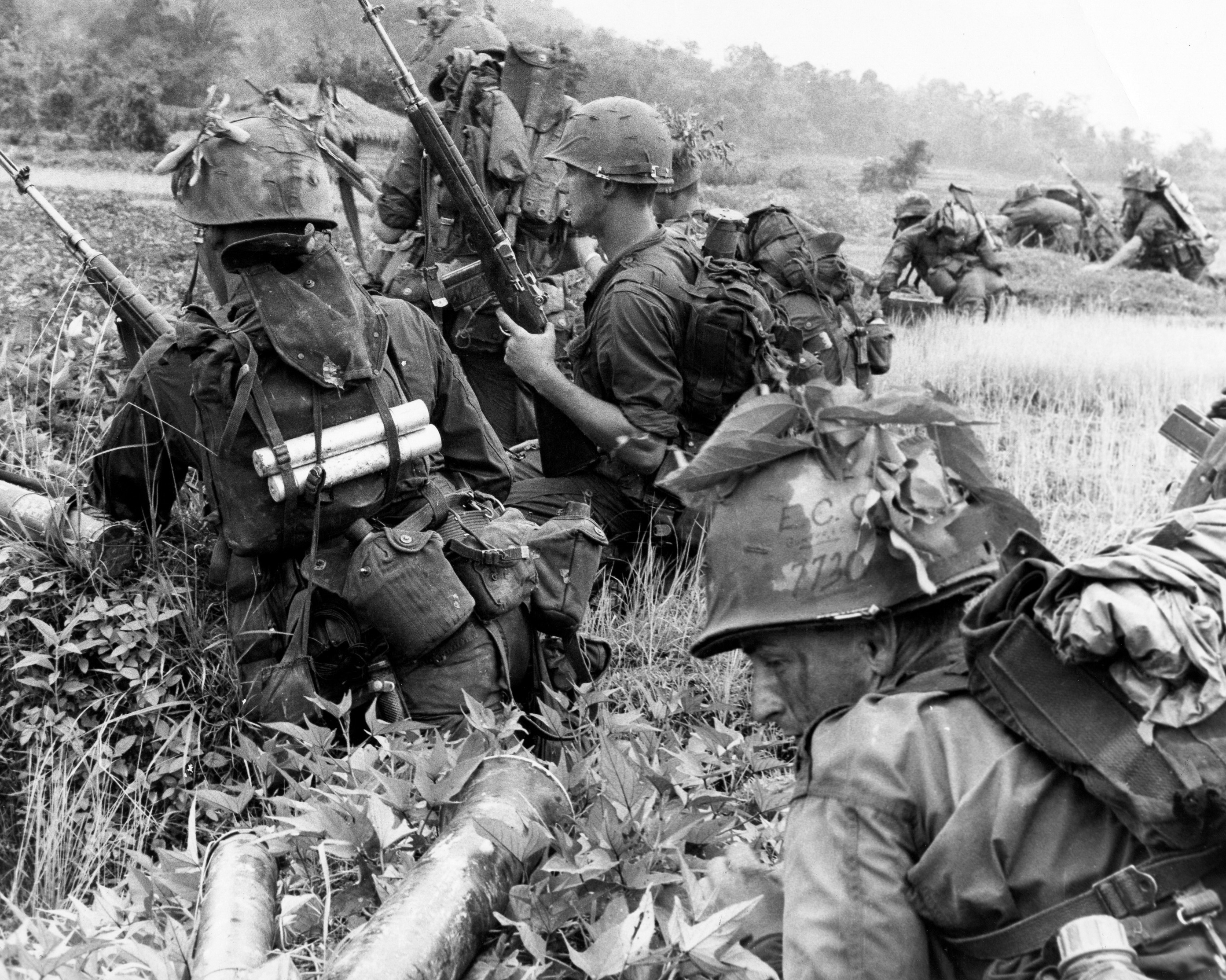
Marines during Operation Harvest Moon in South Vietnam in December 1965

During its existence, South Vietnam had a close, strategic alliance with the United States and served as a major counterbalance to the communist-backed North Vietnam.

At the 1954 Geneva Conference, neither the United States government nor Ngô Đình Diệm's State of Vietnam signed any document agreeing to the partition of Vietnam. With respect to the question of reunification, the non-communist Vietnamese delegation objected strenuously to any division of Vietnam, but lost out when the French accepted the proposal of Viet Minh delegate Phạm Văn Đồng, who proposed that Vietnam eventually be united by elections under the supervision of "local commissions". In fact, it was then conceived not as a temporary demarcation, but as a dividing boundary. The United States countered with what became known as the "American Plan", with the support of the State of Vietnam and the United Kingdom. It provided for unification elections under the supervision of the United Nations, but was rejected by the Soviet delegation and the Viet Minh. U.S. President Dwight D. Eisenhower wrote in 1954 that "I have never talked or corresponded with a person knowledgeable in Indochinese affairs who did not agree that had elections been held as of the time of the fighting, possibly eighty percent of the population would have voted for the Communist Ho Chi Minh as their leader rather than Chief of State Bảo Đại. Indeed, the lack of leadership and drive on the part of Bảo Đại was a factor in the feeling prevalent among Vietnamese that they had nothing to fight for." According to the Pentagon Papers, however, from 1954 to 1956 "Ngô Đình Diệm really did accomplish miracles" in South Vietnam: "It is almost certain that by 1956 the proportion which might have voted for Ho—in a free election against Diệm—would have been much smaller than eighty percent." In 1957, independent observers from India, Poland, and Canada representing the ICC stated that fair, unbiased elections were not possible, reporting that neither South nor North Vietnam had honored the armistice agreement.

The failure to unify the country in 1956 led in 1959 to the foundation of the National Front for the Liberation of South Vietnam (commonly known as the Việt Cộng), which initiated an organized and widespread guerrilla insurgency against the South Vietnamese government. Hanoi directed the insurgency, which grew in intensity. The United States, under President Eisenhower, initially sent military advisers to train the South Vietnamese Army. President John F. Kennedy increased the size of the advisory force fourfold and allowed the advisers to participate in combat operations, and later acquiesced in the removal of President Diệm in a military coup.

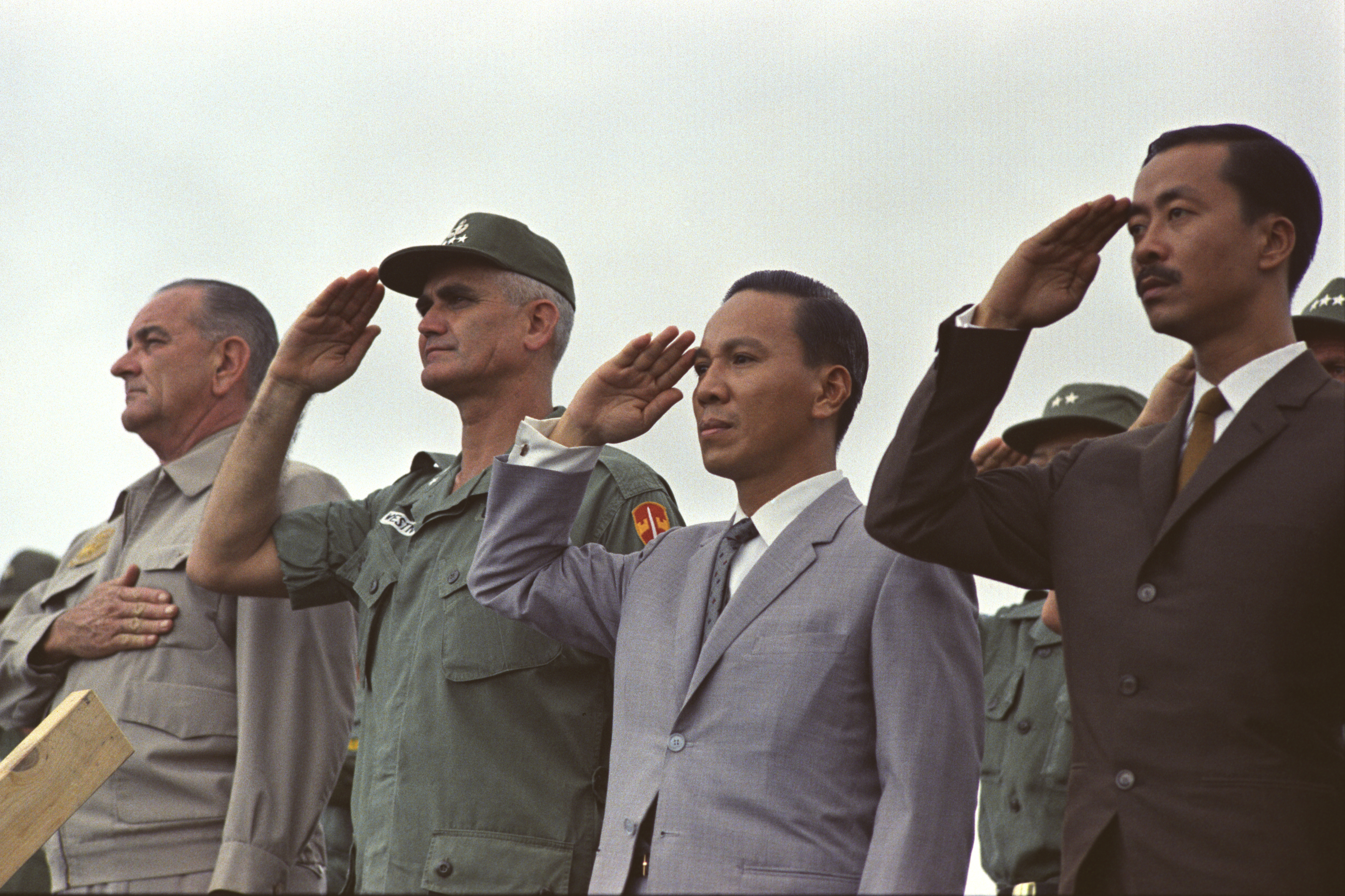
President Johnson, General Westmoreland, Lieutenant General Thiệu, and Prime Minister Kỳ at Cam Ranh Bay, 1966

After promising not to do so during the 1964 election campaign, in 1965 President Lyndon B. Johnson decided to send in much larger numbers of combat troops, and conflict steadily escalated to become what is commonly known as the Vietnam War. In 1968, the NLF ceased to be an effective fighting organization after the Tet Offensive and the war was largely taken over by regular army units of North Vietnam. Following American withdrawal from the war in 1973, the South Vietnamese government continued fighting the North Vietnamese, until, overwhelmed by a conventional invasion by the North, it finally unconditionally surrendered on 30 April 1975, the day of the fall of Saigon. North Vietnam controlled South Vietnam under military occupation, while the Provisional Revolutionary Government of the Republic of South Vietnam, which had been proclaimed in June 1969 by the NLF, became the nominal government. The North Vietnamese quickly moved to marginalise non-communist members of the PRG and integrate South Vietnam into the communist North. The unified Socialist Republic of Vietnam was inaugurated on 2 July 1976.

The Embassy of the Republic of Vietnam in Washington donated 527 reels of South Vietnamese-produced film to the Library of Congress during the embassy's closure following the Fall of Saigon, which are in the Library to this day.

== Economy ==
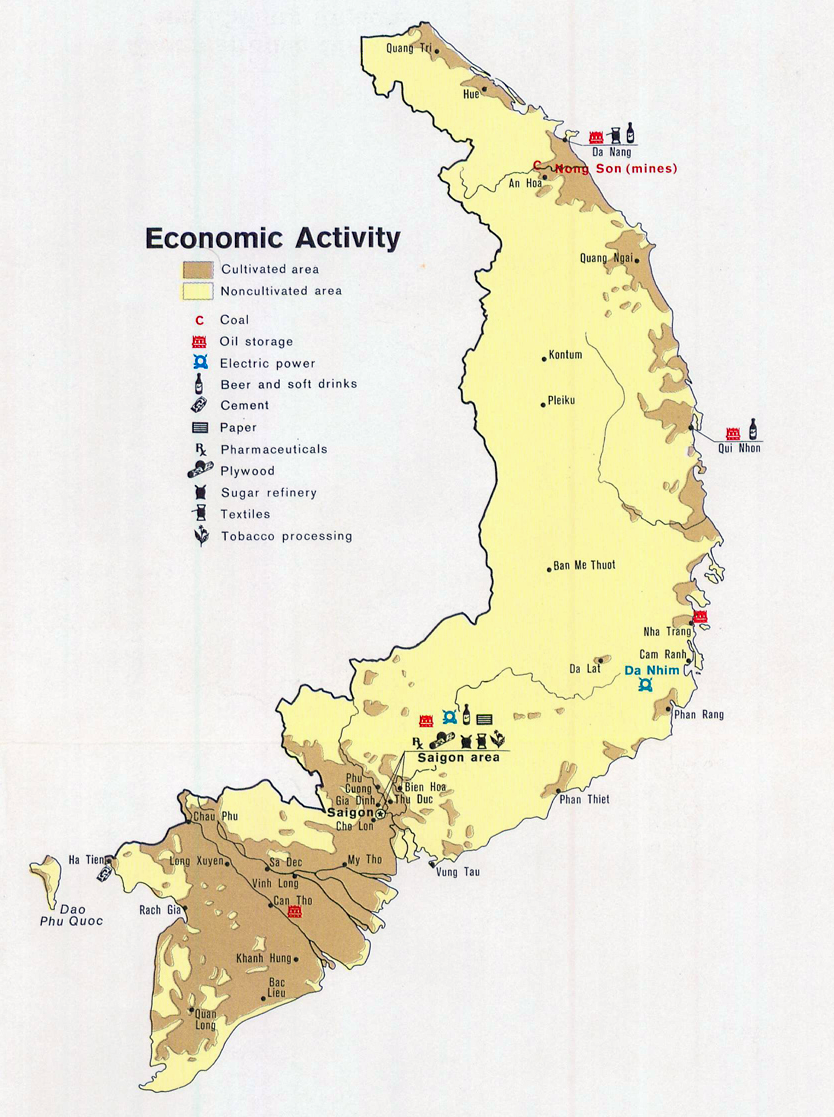
South Vietnam Economic Map

South Vietnam maintained a capitalist free-market economy with ties to the West. The economy was greatly assisted by American aid and the presence of large numbers of Americans in the country between 1961 and 1973 during Vietnam War. In 1951, South Vietnam established the airline Air Vietnam. Electrical production increased fourteen-fold between 1954 and 1973 while industrial output increase by an average of 6.9 percent annually. During the same period, rice output increased by 203 percent and the number of students in university increased from 2,000 to 90,000. US aid peaked at $2.3 billion in 1973, but dropped to $1.1 billion in 1974. Inflation rose to 200 percent as the country suffered economic shock due to the decrease of American aid as well as the oil price shock of October 1973. The unification of Vietnam in 1976 was followed by the imposition of North Vietnam's centrally planned economy in the South.

A 2017 study in the journal Diplomatic History found that South Vietnamese economic planners sought to model the South Vietnamese economy on Taiwan, South Korea, and Japan, which were perceived as successful examples of how to modernize developing economies.

== Demographics ==
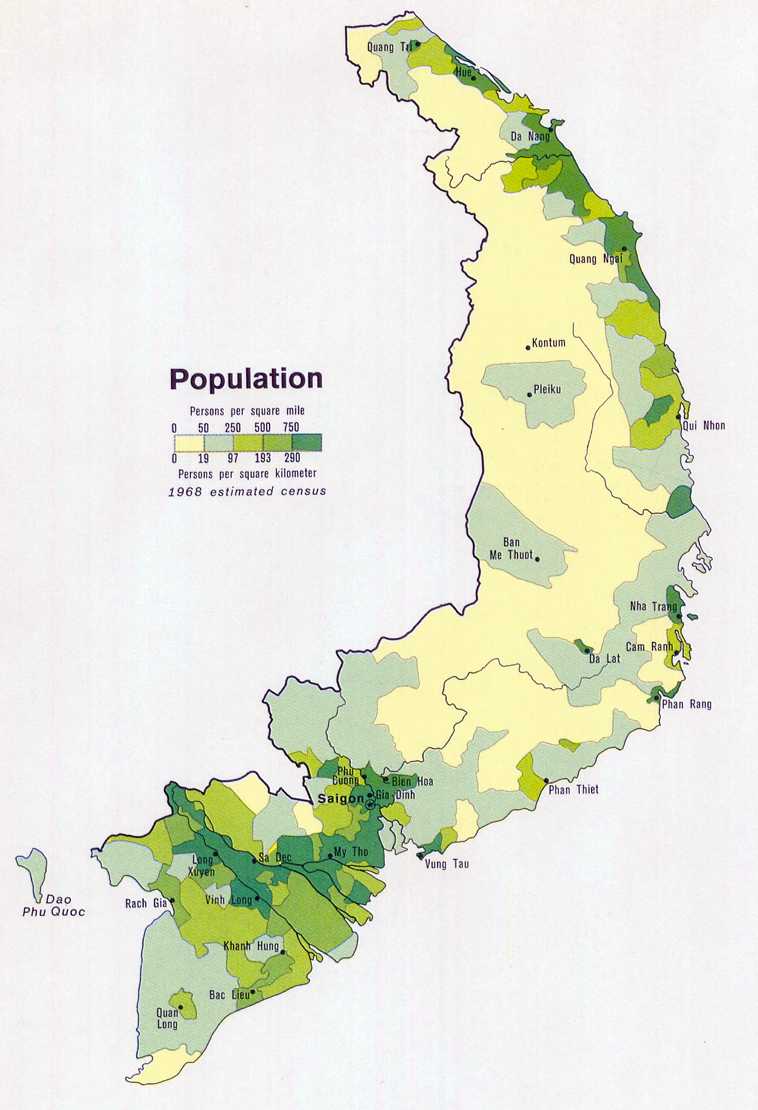
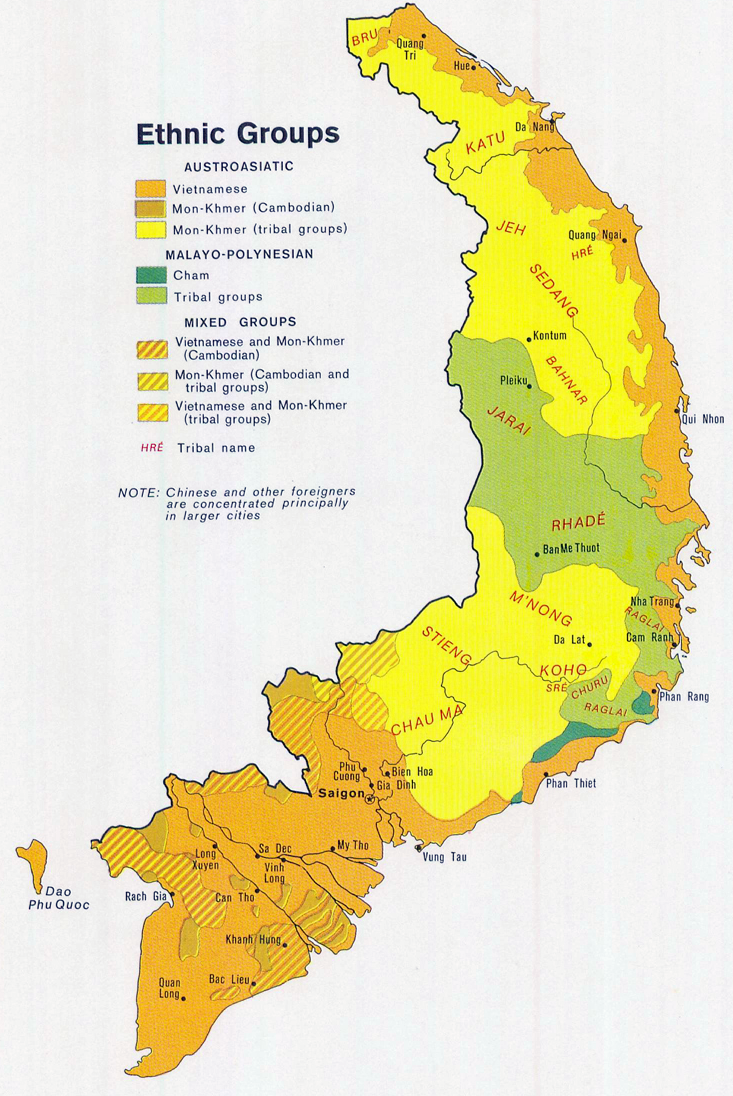
South Vietnam population density map (left) and South Vietnamese ethnic map (right)

In 1968, the population of South Vietnam was estimated to be 16,259,334. However, about one-fifth of the people who lived in southern Vietnam (the Mekong–Dong Nai delta) lived in areas that were controlled by Viet Cong. In 1970 about 90% of population was Kinh (Viet), and 10% was Hoa (Chinese), Montagnard, Khmer, Cham, Eurasians and others.

Vietnamese was the official language and was spoken by the majority of the population. Despite the end of French colonial rule, the French language maintained a strong presence in South Vietnam where it was used in administration, education (especially at the secondary and higher levels), trade and diplomacy. The ruling elite of South Vietnam spoke French. With US involvement in the Vietnam War, English was also later introduced to the armed forces and became a secondary diplomatic language. Languages spoken by minority groups included Chinese, Khmer, Cham, and other languages spoken by Montagnard groups.

Starting from 1955, the South Vietnamese government of Ngô Đình Diệm carried out an assimilation policy towards the indigenous Montagnard of the Central Highlands and the Cham people, including banning the Cham language in public schools, seizing indigenous lands and granting them to the Kinh people. This resulted in increasing nationalism and support for independence among the Cham and other indigenous peoples. Some Cham joined the Viet Cong, some others joined the Front de Libération des Hauts Plateaux du Champa. By 1964, civil rights activists and independent organizations of the indigenous peoples, including Cham organizations, had been merged into the Front Unifié de Lutte des Races Opprimées (FULRO), which struggled against both the governments of South Vietnam and the succeeding Socialist Republic of Vietnam until the late 1980s.

South Vietnam had relatively greater freedom of religion than the North. Confucianism as an ethical philosophy was an important influence in South Vietnam. In 1963, there were about 4 million Confucians in the proper sense. Between 3 and 4 million people, or up to 27% of the population, were Buddhists of various schools. The Cao Đài and Hòa Hảo religions together had between 2.5 and 3 million followers. One and a half million, or about 10% of the population, were Catholic. Other citizens were animists, Taoists, Protestant Christians, Hindus, or Muslims.

== Culture ==
Many families comprised three generations living under one roof. During the 1960s, the emerging South Vietnamese middle class and youth became increasingly modernized, adopting Western cultural and social trends, particularly in fashion, music, and social attitudes in major cities such as Saigon. South Vietnam experienced a flourishing culture characterized by rich artistic and literary expression.

=== Education ===
The educational system of the Republic of Vietnam was diverse, encompassing private and state institutions, as well as schools affiliated with ethnic communities and religious denominations. The Congress of Education in 1958 defined three main principles of education: humanism (nhân bản), nation (dân tộc), and liberalism (khai phóng).

The intellectual culture of universities in South Vietnam, with their journals, literary societies, and cultural groups, was highly varied. Some were associated with religions such as Catholicism, Buddhism, and Hòa Hảo; some were politically radical, others more conservative, and still others rarely addressed politics at all. This intellectual cultural space was defined by four key traits: it was cosmopolitan, drawing ideas and influences from around the world; modernist, focused on shaping the country's future development; influenced first by French trends and later by American ideas; and noncommunist and republican in outlook, though not strongly anticommunist.

=== Media ===
==== Radio ====
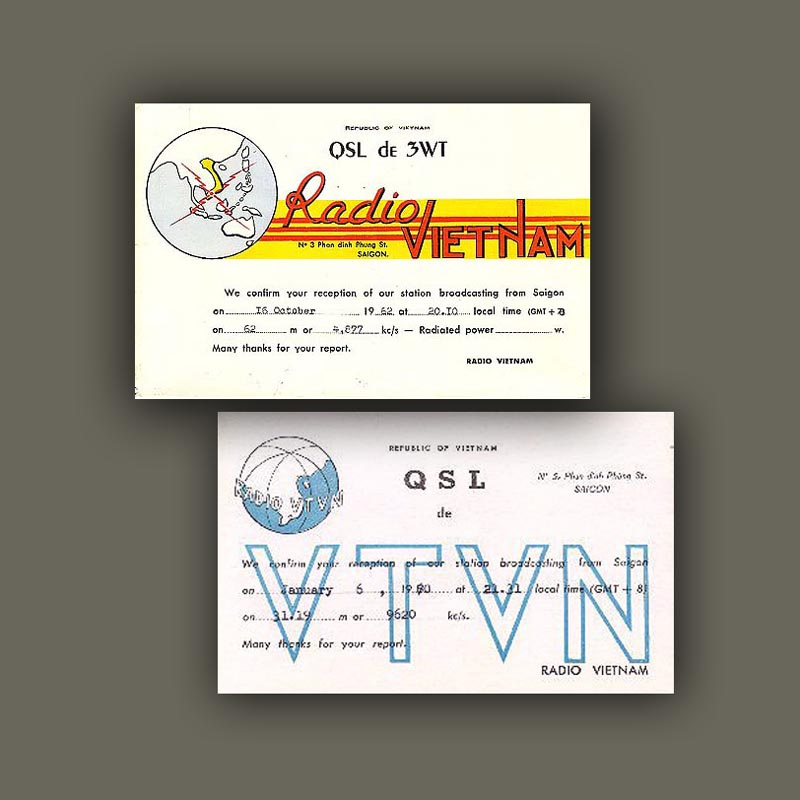
Radio Vietnam broadcast hours cards, denoting times and frequencies of radio broadcasts in 1960 and 1962.

1974 English language Voice of Vietnam (Radio Vietnam) foreign service broadcast from Saigon

There were four AM and one FM radio stations, all of them owned by the government (VTVN), named Radio Vietnam. One of them was designated as a nationwide civilian broadcast, another was for military service and the other two stations included a French-language broadcast station and foreign language station broadcasting in Chinese, English, Khmer and Thai. Radio Vietnam started its operation in 1955 under then President Ngô Đình Diệm, and ceased operation on 30 April 1975, with the broadcast of surrender by Duong Van Minh. The radio stations across the former South were later reused by the communist regime to broadcast their state-run radio service.

==== Television ====
Television was introduced to South Vietnam on 7 February 1966 with a black-and-white FCC system. Covering major cities in South Vietnam, started with a one-hour broadcast per day then increased to six hours in the evening during the 1970s. There were two main channels:

- THVN-TV (Truyền hình Việt Nam-TV) on Channel 9, featuring Vietnamese-language shows, news, and special announcements from Saigon. This entirely Vietnamese language channel catered to the Vietnamese populace.
- AFVN-TV on Channel 11, operated by Armed Forces Radio and Television Service (now American Forces Network), catered to US troops in South Vietnam. Broadcasting entirely in English, it relayed popular US-made shows like The Ed Sullivan Show and The Tonight Show Starring Johnny Carson, and various sports games like the World Series. It also broadcast news and special announcements from the American government and military commanders.

Both channels used an airborne transmission relay system from airplanes flying at high altitudes, called Stratovision.

== See also ==
- Flag of South Vietnam
- Thanh Niên Hành Khúc
- History of Vietnam
- Vietnamese diaspora

== Bibliography ==
=== Academic articles and chapters ===
- Gadkar-Wilcox, Wynn (2023). "Universities and Intellectual Culture in the Republic of Vietnam". In Peché, Linda Ho; Vo, Alex-Thai Dinh; Vu, Tuong (eds.). Toward a Framework for Vietnamese American Studies: History, Community, and Memory. Temple University Press. pp. 57–75. ISBN 978-1-4399-2288-0.
- Hoang, Tuan (2009). "The Early South Vietnamese Critique of Communism" (PDF). In Vu, Tuong; Wongsurawat, Wasana (eds.). Dynamics of the Cold War in Asia: Ideology, Identity, and Culture. Palgrave Macmillan. pp. 17–32. doi:10.1057/9780230101999_2. ISBN 9780230101999.
- Hoang, Tuan (2023). "The August Revolution, the Fall of Saigon, and Postwar Reeducation Camps: Understanding Vietnamese Diasporic Anticommunism". In Peché, Linda Ho; Vo, Alex-Thai Dinh; Vu, Tuong (eds.). Toward a Framework for Vietnamese American Studies: History, Community, and Memory. Temple University Press. pp. 76–94. ISBN 978-1-4399-2288-0.
- Nguyen, Phi-Vân (2018). "A Secular State for a Religious Nation: The Republic of Vietnam and Religious Nationalism, 1946–1963". The Journal of Asian Studies. 77 (3): 741–771. doi:10.1017/S0021911818000505. hdl:1993/34017. S2CID 165729774.
- Tran, Nu-Anh (2023). "Denouncing the 'Việt Cộng': Tales of revolution and betrayal in the Republic of Vietnam". Journal of Southeast Asian Studies. 53 (4): 686–708. doi:10.1017/S0022463422000790. S2CID 256739269.

=== Monographs and edited volumes ===
- Miller, Edward (2013). Misalliance: Ngo Dinh Diem, the United States, and the Fate of South Vietnam. Harvard University Press. ISBN 978-0-674-07298-5.
- Chapman, Jessica M. (2013). Cauldron of Resistance: Ngo Dinh Diem, the United States, and 1950s Southern Vietnam. Cornell University Press. ISBN 978-0-8014-5061-7.
- Taylor, K. W., ed. (2015). Voices from the Second Republic of South Vietnam (1967–1975). Cornell University Press. ISBN 978-0-87727-795-8.
- Goscha, Christopher (2016). Vietnam: A New History. Basic Books. ISBN 9780465094370.
- Kort, Michael G. (2017). The Vietnam War Reexamined. Cambridge University Press. doi:10.1017/9781107110199. ISBN 9781107110199.
- Vu, Tuong; Fear, Sean, eds. (2020). The Republic of Vietnam, 1955–1975: Vietnamese Perspectives on Nation Building. Cornell University Press. ISBN 978-1-5017-4512-6.
- Stur, Heather Marie (2020). Saigon at War: South Vietnam and the Global Sixties. Cambridge University Press. ISBN 978-1-316-67675-2.
- Tran, Nu-Anh (2022). Disunion: Anticommunist Nationalism and the Making of the Republic of Vietnam. University of Hawaiʻi Press. ISBN 978-0-8248-8786-5.
- Tran, Nu-Anh; Vu, Tuong, eds. (2022). Building a Republican Nation in Vietnam, 1920–1963. University of Hawaiʻi Press. ISBN 978-0-8248-9211-1.
- Luu, Trinh M.; Vu, Tuong, eds. (2023). Republican Vietnam, 1963–1975: War, Society, Diaspora. University of Hawaiʻi Press. ISBN 978-0-8248-9518-1.
- Nguyen-Marshall, Van (2023). Between War and the State: Civil Society in South Vietnam, 1954–1975. Cornell University Press. ISBN 9781501770579.
- Asselin, Pierre (2024). Vietnam's American War: A New History. Cambridge University Press. ISBN 9781009229302.
- Nguyen, Phi-Van (2024). A Displaced Nation: The 1954 Evacuation and Its Political Impact on the Vietnam Wars. Cornell University Press. ISBN 9781501778612.

Preceded by State of Việt Nam	Republic of Việt Nam; 1955–1975	Succeeded by Provisional Revolutionary Government
