= Espionage Act of 1917 =

United States federal law

- Long title: An Act to punish acts of interference with the foreign relations, and the foreign commerce of the United States, to punish espionage, and better to enforce the criminal laws of the United States, and for other purposes.
- Enacted by: the 65th United States Congress
- Effective: June 15, 1917

Citations
- Public law: Pub. L. 65–24
- Statutes at Large: 40 Stat. 217

Legislative history
- Introduced in the House as H.R. 291 by Edwin Y. Webb (D–NC) on April 2, 1917; Passed the House on May 4, 1917 (261–109); Passed the Senate on May 14, 1917 (80–8); Signed into law by President Woodrow Wilson on June 15, 1917

United States Supreme Court cases
- Schenck v. United States, 249 U.S. 47 (1919); Debs v. United States, 249 U.S. 211 (1919); Abrams v. United States, 250 U.S. 616 (1919); Berger v. United States, 255 U.S. 22 (1921)

The Espionage Act of 1917 is a United States federal law enacted on June 15, 1917, shortly after the United States entered World War I. It has been amended numerous times over the years. It was originally found in Title 50 of the U.S. Code (War & National Defense), but is now found under Title 18 (Crime & Criminal Procedure): 18 U.S.C. ch. 37 (18 U.S.C. § 792 et seq.).

It was intended to prohibit interference with military operations or recruitment, to prevent insubordination in the military, and to prevent the support of enemies of the United States during wartime. In 1919, the Supreme Court of the United States unanimously ruled through Schenck v. United States that the act did not violate the freedom of speech of those convicted under its provisions. The constitutionality of the law, its relationship to free speech and the meaning of its language have been contested in court ever since.

Among those charged with offenses under the Act were: Austrian-American socialist congressman and newspaper editor Victor L. Berger; labor leader and five-time Socialist Party of America candidate Eugene V. Debs, anarchists Emma Goldman and Alexander Berkman, former Watch Tower Bible & Tract Society president Joseph Franklin Rutherford (whose conviction was overturned on appeal), communists Julius and Ethel Rosenberg, Pentagon Papers whistleblower Daniel Ellsberg, Cablegate whistleblower Chelsea Manning, WikiLeaks founder Julian Assange, Defense Intelligence Agency employee Henry Kyle Frese, and National Security Agency (NSA) contractor whistleblower Edward Snowden. Although the most controversial amendments, called the Sedition Act of 1918, were repealed on December 13, 1920, the original Espionage Act was left intact. Between 1921 and 1923, presidents Warren G. Harding and Calvin Coolidge released all those convicted under the Sedition and Espionage Acts.

== Enactment ==
The Espionage Act of 1917 was passed, along with the Trading with the Enemy Act, just after the United States entered World War I in April 1917. It was based on the Defense Secrets Act of 1911, especially the notions of obtaining or delivering information relating to "national defense" to a person who was not "entitled to have it". The Espionage Act law imposed much stiffer penalties than the 1911 law, including the death penalty.

President Woodrow Wilson, in his December 7, 1915, State of the Union address, asked Congress for the legislation. Congress moved slowly. Even after the U.S. broke diplomatic relations with Germany, when the Senate passed a version on February 20, 1917, the House did not vote before the then-current session of Congress ended. After the declaration of war in April 1917, both houses debated versions of the Wilson administration's drafts that included press censorship. That provision aroused opposition, with critics charging it established a system of "prior restraint" and delegated unlimited power to the president. After weeks of intermittent debate, the Senate removed the censorship provision by a one-vote margin, voting 39 to 38. Wilson still insisted it was needed: "Authority to exercise censorship over the press....is absolutely necessary to the public safety", but signed the Act without the censorship provisions on June 15, 1917, after Congress passed the act on the same day.

Attorney General Thomas Watt Gregory supported passage of the act but viewed it as a compromise. The President's Congressional rivals were proposing to remove responsibility for monitoring pro-German activity, whether espionage or some form of disloyalty, from the Department of Justice to the War Department and creating a form of courts-martial of doubtful constitutionality. The resulting Act was far more aggressive and restrictive than they wanted, but it silenced citizens opposed to the war. Officials in the Justice Department who had little enthusiasm for the law nevertheless hoped that even without generating many prosecutions it would help quiet public calls for more government action against those thought to be insufficiently patriotic. Wilson was denied language in the Act authorizing power to the executive branch for press censorship, but Congress did include a provision to block distribution of print materials through the Post Office.

It made it a crime:

- To convey information with the intent to interfere with the operation or success of the armed forces of the United States or to promote its enemies' success. This was punishable by death or imprisonment for not more than 30 years or both.
- To convey false reports or false statements with intent to interfere with the operation or success of the military or naval forces of the United States or to promote the success of its enemies when the United States is at war, to cause or attempt to cause insubordination, disloyalty, mutiny, refusal of duty, in the military or naval forces of the United States, or to willfully obstruct the recruiting or enlistment service of the United States. This was punishable by a maximum fine of $10,000 or by imprisonment for not more than 20 years or both.

The Act also gave the Postmaster General authority to impound or refuse to mail publications the postmaster determined to violate its prohibitions.

The Act also forbids the transfer of any naval vessel equipped for combat to any nation engaged in a conflict in which the United States is neutral. Seemingly uncontroversial when the Act was passed, this later became a legal stumbling block for the administration of Franklin D. Roosevelt, when he sought to provide military aid to Great Britain before the United States entered World War II.

=== Amendments ===
The law was extended on May 16, 1918, by the Sedition Act of 1918, actually a set of amendments to the Espionage Act, which prohibited many forms of speech, including "any disloyal, profane, scurrilous, or abusive language about the form of government of the United States ... or the flag of the United States, or the uniform of the Army or Navy".

Because the Sedition Act was an informal name, court cases were brought under the name of the Espionage Act, whether the charges were based on the provisions of the Espionage Act or the provisions of the amendments known informally as the Sedition Act.

On March 3, 1921, the Sedition Act amendments were repealed, but many provisions of the Espionage Act remain, codified under U.S.C. Title 18, Part 1, Chapter 37.

In 1933, after signals intelligence expert Herbert Yardley published a popular book about breaking Japanese codes, the Act was amended to prohibit the disclosure of foreign code or anything sent in code. The Act was amended in 1940 to increase the penalties it imposed, and again in 1970.

In the late 1940s, the U.S. Code was re-organized and much of Title 50 (War) was moved to Title 18 (Crime). The McCarran Internal Security Act added 18 U.S.C. § 793(e) in 1950 and 18 U.S.C. § 798 was added the same year.

In 1961, Congressman Richard Poff succeeded after several attempts in removing language that restricted the Act's application to territory "within the jurisdiction of the United States, on the high seas, and within the United States" 18 U.S.C. § 791. He said the need for the Act to apply everywhere was prompted by Irvin C. Scarbeck, a State Department official who was charged with yielding to blackmail threats in Poland.

=== Proposed amendments ===
In 1989, Congressman James Traficant tried to amend 18 U.S.C. § 794 to broaden the application of the death penalty. Senator Arlen Specter proposed a comparable expansion of the use of the death penalty the same year. In 1994, Robert K. Dornan proposed the death penalty for the disclosure of a U.S. agent's identity.

== History ==
=== World War I ===
Much of the Act's enforcement was left to the discretion of local United States Attorneys, so enforcement varied widely. For example, Socialist Kate Richards O'Hare gave the same speech in several states but was convicted and sentenced to prison for five years for delivering her speech in North Dakota. Most enforcement activities occurred in the Western states where the Industrial Workers of the World was active. Finally, a few weeks before the end of the war, the U.S. Attorney General instructed U.S. Attorneys not to act without his approval.

A year after the Act's passage, Eugene V. Debs, Socialist Party presidential candidate in 1904, 1908, and 1912 was arrested and sentenced to 10 years in prison for making a speech that "obstructed recruiting". He ran for president again in 1920 from prison. President Warren G. Harding commuted his sentence in December 1921 when he had served nearly five years.

In United States v. Motion Picture Film (1917), a federal court upheld the government's seizure of a film called The Spirit of '76 on the grounds that its depiction of cruelty on the part of British soldiers during the American Revolution would undermine support for America's wartime ally. The producer, Robert Goldstein, a Jew of German origins, was prosecuted under Title XI of the Act and received a ten-year sentence plus a fine of $5000. The sentence was commuted on appeal to three years.

Floyd Ramp, a founder of the U.S Communist Party, was sentenced to two years in prison for telling military personnel they were "fighting to protect [Rockefeller] money". Ramp was charged under the Espionage Act for conspiracy to obstruct the draft. The FBI called him "one of the most notorious radicals" in the United States.

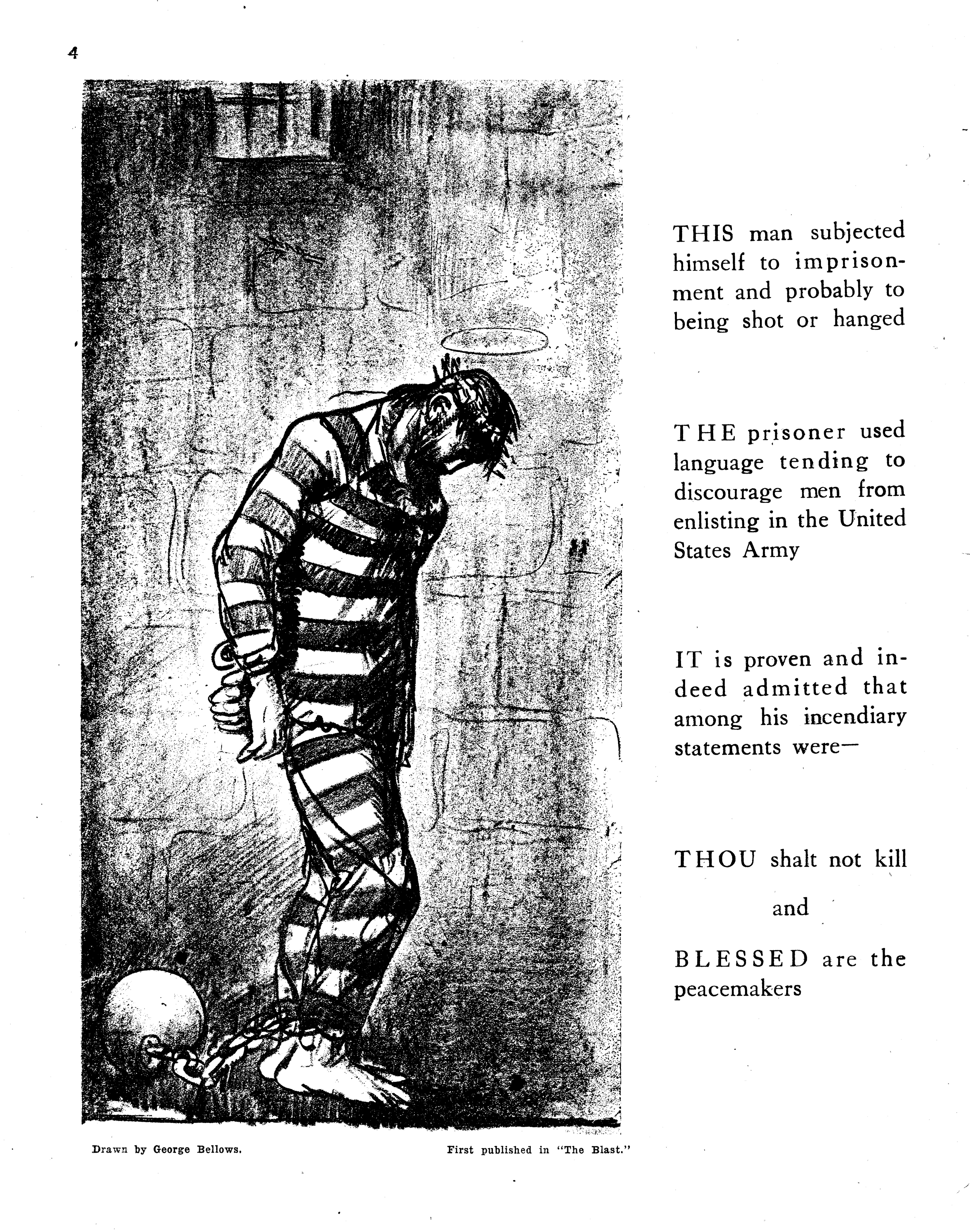
Blessed are the Peacemakers by George Bellows, The Masses 1917

Postmaster General Albert S. Burleson and those in his department played critical roles in the enforcement of the Act. He held his position because he was a Democratic party loyalist and close to the President and the Attorney General. When the Department of Justice numbered its investigators in the dozens, the Post Office had a nationwide network in place. The day after the Act became law, Burleson sent a secret memo to all postmasters ordering them to keep "close watch on ... matter which is calculated to interfere with the success of ... the government in conducting the war". Postmasters in Savannah, Georgia, and Tampa, Florida, refused to mail the Jeffersonian, the mouthpiece of Tom Watson, a southern populist, an opponent of the draft, the war, and minority groups. When Watson sought an injunction against the postmaster, the federal judge who heard the case called his publication "poison" and denied his request. Government censors objected to the headline "Civil Liberty Dead". In New York City, the postmaster refused to mail The Masses, a socialist monthly, citing the publication's "general tenor". The Masses was more successful in the courts, where Judge Learned Hand found the Act was applied so vaguely as to threaten "the tradition of English-speaking freedom". The editors were then prosecuted for obstructing the draft, and the publication folded when denied access to the mails again. Eventually, Burleson's vigorous enforcement overreached when he targeted supporters of the administration. The president warned him to exercise "the utmost caution", and the dispute proved the end of their political friendship.

In May 1918, sedition charges were laid under the Espionage Act against Watch Tower Bible and Tract Society president "Judge" Joseph Rutherford and seven other Watch Tower directors and officers over statements made in the society's book, The Finished Mystery, published a year earlier. According to the book Preachers Present Arms by Ray H. Abrams, the passage (from page 247) found to be particularly objectionable reads: "Nowhere in the New Testament is patriotism (a narrowly minded hatred of other peoples) encouraged. Everywhere and always murder in its every form is forbidden. And yet under the guise of patriotism civil governments of the earth demand of peace-loving men the sacrifice of themselves and their loved ones and the butchery of their fellows, and hail it as a duty demanded by the laws of heaven." The officers of the Watchtower Society were charged with attempting to cause insubordination, disloyalty, refusal of duty in the armed forces and obstructing the recruitment and enlistment service of the U.S. while it was at war. The book had been banned in Canada since February 1918 for what a Winnipeg newspaper described as "seditious and antiwar statements" and described by Attorney General Gregory as dangerous propaganda. On June 21 seven of the directors, including Rutherford, were sentenced to the maximum 20 years' imprisonment for each of four charges, to be served concurrently. They served nine months in the Atlanta Penitentiary before being released on bail at the order of Supreme Court Justice Louis Brandeis. In April 1919, an appeal court ruled they had not had the "intemperate and impartial trial of which they were entitled" and reversed their conviction. In May 1920 the government announced that all charges had been dropped.

=== Red Scare, Palmer Raids, mass arrests, deportations ===
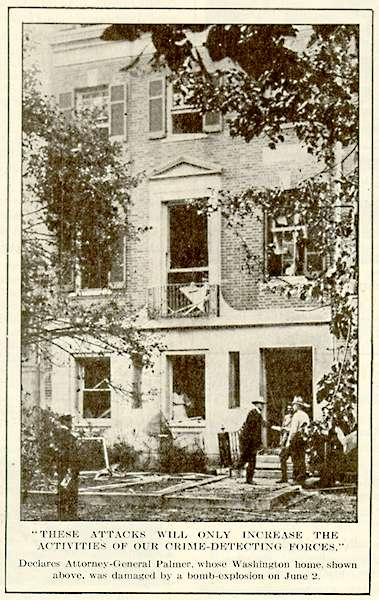
The house of Attorney General Palmer after being bombed by anarchists in 1919; Palmer was not injured, although his housekeeper was

During the Red Scare of 1918–19, in response to the 1919 anarchist bombings aimed at prominent government officials and businessmen, U.S. Attorney General A. Mitchell Palmer, supported by J. Edgar Hoover, then head of the Justice Department's Enemy Aliens Registration Section, prosecuted several hundred foreign-born known and suspected activists in the United States under the Sedition Act of 1918. This extended the Espionage Act to cover a broader range of offenses. After being convicted, persons including Emma Goldman and Alexander Berkman were deported to the Soviet Union on a ship the press called the "Soviet Ark".

A version of Chafee's "Free Speech in War Times", the work that helped change Justice Holmes' mind

Many of the jailed had appealed their convictions based on the U.S. constitutional right to the freedom of speech. The Supreme Court disagreed. The Espionage Act limits on free speech were ruled constitutional in the U.S. Supreme Court case Schenck v. United States (1919). Schenck, an anti-war Socialist, had been convicted of violating the Act when he sent anti-draft pamphlets to men eligible for the draft. Although Supreme Court Justice Oliver Wendell Holmes joined the Court majority in upholding Schenck's conviction in 1919, he also introduced the theory that punishment in such cases must be limited to such political expression that constitutes a "clear and present danger" to the government action at issue. Holmes' opinion is the origin of the notion that speech equivalent to "falsely shouting fire in a crowded theater" is not protected by the First Amendment.

Justice Holmes began to doubt his decision due to criticism from free speech advocates. He also met the Harvard Law professor Zechariah Chafee and discussed his criticism of Schenck.

Later in 1919, in Abrams v. United States, the Supreme Court upheld the conviction of a man who distributed circulars in opposition to American intervention in Russia following the Russian Revolution. The concept of bad tendency was used to justify speech restriction. The defendant was deported. Justices Holmes and Brandeis dissented, the former arguing "nobody can suppose that the surreptitious publishing of a silly leaflet by an unknown man, without more, would present any immediate danger that its opinions would hinder the success of the government arms or have any appreciable tendency to do so".

In March 1919, President Wilson, at the suggestion of Attorney General Thomas Watt Gregory, pardoned or commuted the sentences of some 200 prisoners convicted under the Espionage Act or the Sedition Act. By early 1921, the Red Scare had faded, Palmer left government, and the Espionage Act fell into relative disuse.

=== World War II ===
Prosecutions under the Act were much less numerous during World War II than during World War I. The likely reason was not that Roosevelt was more tolerant of dissent than Wilson but rather that the lack of continuing opposition after the Pearl Harbor attack presented far fewer potential targets for prosecutions under the law. Associate Justice Frank Murphy noted in 1944 in Hartzel v. United States: "For the first time during the course of the present war, we are confronted with a prosecution under the Espionage Act of 1917." Hartzel, a World War I veteran, had distributed anti-war pamphlets to associations and business groups. The court's majority found that his materials, though comprising "vicious and unreasoning attacks on one of our military allies, flagrant appeals to false and sinister racial theories, and gross libels of the President", did not urge mutiny or any of the other specific actions detailed in the Act, and that he had targeted molders of public opinion, not members of the armed forces or potential military recruits. The court overturned his conviction in a 5–4 decision. The four dissenting justices declined to "intrude on the historic function of the jury" and would have upheld the conviction. In Gorin v. United States (early 1941), the Supreme Court ruled on many constitutional questions surrounding the act.

The Act was used in 1942 to deny a mailing permit to Father Charles Coughlin's weekly Social Justice, effectively ending its distribution to subscribers. It was part of Attorney General Francis Biddle's attempt to close down what he called "vermin publications". Coughlin had been criticized for virulently anti-Semitic writings. Later, Biddle supported use of the Act to deny mailing permits to both The Militant, which was published by the Socialist Workers Party, and the Boise Valley Herald, an anti-New Deal and anti-war weekly. The Herald had also criticized wartime racism against African Americans and Japanese internment. .

The same year, a June front-page story by Stanley Johnston in the Chicago Tribune, headlined "Navy Had Word of Jap Plan to Strike at Sea", implied that the Americans had broken the Japanese codes before the Battle of Midway. Before submitting the story, Johnson asked the managing editor, Loy “Pat” Maloney, and Washington Bureau Chief Arthur Sears Henning if the content violated the Code of Wartime Practices. They concluded that it was in compliance because the code had said nothing about reporting the movement of enemy ships in enemy waters.

The story resulted in the Japanese changing their codebooks and callsign systems. The newspaper publishers were brought before a grand jury for possible indictment, but proceedings were halted because of government reluctance to present a jury with the highly secret information necessary to prosecute the publishers. In addition, the Navy had failed to provide promised evidence that the story had revealed "confidential information concerning the Battle of Midway". Attorney General Biddle confessed years later that the final result of the case made him feel "like a fool".

In 1945, six associates of Amerasia magazine, a journal of Far Eastern affairs, came under suspicion after publishing articles that bore similarity to Office of Strategic Services reports. The government proposed using the Espionage Act against them. It later softened its approach, changing the charge to Embezzlement of Government Property (now 18 U.S.C. § 641). A grand jury cleared three of the associates, two associates paid small fines, and charges against the sixth man were dropped. Senator Joseph McCarthy said the failure to aggressively prosecute the defendants was a communist conspiracy. According to Klehr and Radosh, the case helped build his later notoriety.

=== Mid-20th century Soviet spies ===
Navy employee Hafis Salich sold Soviet agent Mihail Gorin information regarding Japanese activities in the late 1930s. Gorin v. United States (1941) was cited in many later espionage cases for its discussion of the charge of "vagueness", an argument made against the terminology used in certain portions of the law, such as what constitutes "national defense" information.

Later in the 1940s, several incidents prompted the government to increase its investigations into Soviet espionage. These included the Venona project decryptions, the Elizabeth Bentley case, the atomic spies cases, the First Lightning Soviet nuclear test, and others. Many suspects were surveilled, but never prosecuted. These investigations were dropped, as seen in the FBI Silvermaster Files. There were also many successful prosecutions and convictions under the Act.

In August 1950, Julius and Ethel Rosenberg were indicted under Title 50, sections 32a and 34, in connection with giving nuclear secrets to the Soviet Union. Anatoli Yakovlev was indicted as well. In 1951, Morton Sobell and David Greenglass were indicted. After a controversial trial in 1951, the Rosenbergs were sentenced to death. They were executed in 1953. In the late 1950s, several members of the Soble spy ring, including Robert Soblen, and Jack and Myra Soble, were prosecuted for espionage. In the mid-1960s, the act was used against James Mintkenbaugh and Robert Lee Johnson, who sold information to the Soviets while working for the U.S. Army in Berlin.

=== 1948 code revision ===
In 1948, some portions of the United States Code were reorganized. Much of Title 50 (War and National Defense) was moved to Title 18 (Crimes and Criminal Procedure). Thus Title 50 Chapter 4, Espionage, (Sections 31–39), became Title 18, 794 and following. As a result, certain older cases, such as the Rosenberg case, are now listed under Title 50, while newer cases are often listed under Title 18.

=== 1950 McCarran Internal Security Act ===
In 1950, during the McCarthy Period, Congress passed the McCarran Internal Security Act over President Harry S. Truman's veto. It modified a large body of law, including espionage law. One addition was 793(e), which had almost exactly the same language as 793(d). According to Edgar and Schmidt, the added section potentially removes the "intent" to harm or aid requirement. It may make "mere retention" of information a crime no matter the intent, covering even former government officials writing their memoirs. They also describe McCarran saying that this portion was intended directly to respond to the case of Alger Hiss and the "Pumpkin Papers".

=== Judicial review, 1960s and 1970s ===
==== Brandenburg ====
Court decisions of this era changed the standard for enforcing some provisions of the Espionage Act. Though not a case involving charges under the Act, Brandenburg v. Ohio (1969) changed the "clear and present danger" test derived from Schenck to the "imminent lawless action" test, a considerably stricter test of the inflammatory nature of speech.

==== Pentagon Papers ====
In June 1971, Daniel Ellsberg and Anthony Russo were charged with a felony under the Espionage Act of 1917 because they lacked legal authority to publish classified documents that came to be known as the Pentagon Papers. The Supreme Court in New York Times Co. v. United States found that the government had not made a successful case for prior restraint of Free Speech, but a majority of the justices ruled that the government could still prosecute the Times and the Post for violating the Espionage Act in publishing the documents. Ellsberg and Russo were not acquitted of violating the Espionage Act. They were freed due to a mistrial based on irregularities in the government's case.

The divided Supreme Court had denied the government's request to restrain the press. In their opinions, the justices expressed varying degrees of support for the First Amendment claims of the press against the government's "heavy burden of proof" in establishing that the publisher "has reason to believe" the material published "could be used to the injury of the United States or to the advantage of any foreign nation".

The case prompted Harold Edgar and Benno C. Schmidt Jr. to write an article on espionage law in the 1973 Columbia Law Review. Their article was entitled "The Espionage Statutes and Publication of Defense Information". Essentially, they found the law poorly written and vague, with parts of it probably unconstitutional. Their article became widely cited in books and in future court arguments on Espionage cases.

United States v. Dedeyan in 1978 was the first prosecution under 793(f)(2) (Dedeyan 'failed to report' that information had been disclosed). The courts relied on Gorin v. United States (1941) for precedent. The ruling touched on several constitutional questions, including vagueness of the law and whether the information was "related to national defense". The defendant received a 3-year sentence.

In 1979–80, Truong Dinh Hung (aka David Truong) and Ronald Louis Humphrey were convicted under 793(a), (c), and (e) as well as several other laws. The ruling discussed several constitutional questions regarding espionage law, "vagueness", the difference between classified information and "national defense information", wiretapping and the Fourth Amendment. It also commented on the notion of bad faith (scienter) being a requirement for conviction even under 793(e); an "honest mistake" was said not to be a violation.

=== 1980s ===
Alfred Zehe, a scientist from East Germany, was arrested in Boston in 1983 after being caught in a government-run sting operation in which he had reviewed classified U.S. government documents in Mexico and East Germany. His attorneys contended without success that the indictment was invalid, arguing that the Espionage Act does not cover the activities of a foreign citizen outside the United States. Zehe then pleaded guilty and was sentenced to 8 years in prison. He was released in June 1985 as part of an exchange of four East Europeans held by the U.S. for 25 people held in Poland and East Germany, none of them American.

One of Zehe's defense attorneys claimed his client was prosecuted as part of "the perpetuation of the 'national-security state' by over-classifying documents that there is no reason to keep secret, other than devotion to the cult of secrecy for its own sake".

The media dubbed 1985 "Year of the Spy". U.S. Navy civilian Jonathan Pollard was charged with violating 18 U.S.C. § 794(c), for selling classified information to Israel. His 1986 plea bargain did not get him out of a life sentence, after a 'victim impact statement' including a statement by Caspar Weinberger. Larry Wu-Tai Chin, at CIA, was also charged with violating 18 U.S.C. § 794(c) for selling information to China. Ronald Pelton was prosecuted for violating 18 U.S.C. § 794(a), 794(c), & 798(a), for selling information to the Soviets, and interfering with Operation Ivy Bells. Edward Lee Howard was an ex-Peace Corps and ex-CIA agent charged under 17 U.S.C. § 794(c) for allegedly dealing with the Soviets. The FBI's website says the 1980s was the "decade of the spy", with dozens of arrests.

Seymour Hersh wrote an article entitled "The Traitor" arguing against Pollard's release.

==== Morison ====
Samuel Loring Morison was a government security analyst who worked on the side for Jane's, a British military and defense publisher. He was arrested on October 1, 1984, though investigators never demonstrated any intent to provide information to a hostile intelligence service. Morison told investigators that he sent classified satellite photographs to Jane's because the "public should be aware of what was going on on the other side", meaning that the Soviets' new nuclear-powered aircraft carrier would transform the USSR's military capabilities. He said that "if the American people knew what the Soviets were doing, they would increase the defense budget". British intelligence sources thought his motives were patriotic. American prosecutors emphasized his economic gain and complaints about his government job.

Morison's prosecution was used in a broader campaign against leaks of information as a "test case" for applying the Act to cover the disclosure of information to the press. A March 1984 government report had noted that "the unauthorized publication of classified information is a routine daily occurrence in the U.S." but that the applicability of the Espionage Act to such disclosures "is not entirely clear". Time said that the administration, if it failed to convict Morison, would seek additional legislation and described the ongoing conflict: "The Government does need to protect military secrets, the public does need information to judge defense policies, and the line between the two is surpassingly difficult to draw."

On October 17, 1985, Morison was convicted in Federal Court on two counts of espionage and two counts of theft of government property. He was sentenced to two years in prison on December 4, 1985. The Supreme Court declined to hear his appeal in 1988. Morison became "the only [American] government official ever convicted for giving classified information to the press" up to that time. Following Senator Daniel Patrick Moynihan's 1998 appeal for a pardon for Morison, President Bill Clinton pardoned him on January 20, 2001, the last day of his presidency, despite the CIA's opposition to the pardon.

The successful prosecution of Morison was used to warn against the publication of leaked information. In May 1986, CIA Director William J. Casey, without citing specific violations of law, threatened to prosecute five news organizations–The Washington Post, The Washington Times, The New York Times, Time and Newsweek.

=== Soviet spies, late 20th century ===
Christopher John Boyce of TRW, and his accomplice Andrew Daulton Lee, sold out to the Soviets and went to prison in the 1970s. Their activities were the subject of the movie The Falcon and the Snowman.

In the 1980s, several members of the Walker spy ring were prosecuted and convicted of espionage for the Soviets.

In 1980, David Henry Barnett was the first active CIA officer to be convicted under the act.

In 1994, CIA officer Aldrich Ames was convicted under 18 U.S.C. § 794(c) of spying for the Soviets; Ames had revealed the identities of several U.S. sources in the USSR to the KGB, who were then executed.

FBI agent Earl Edwin Pitts was arrested in 1996 under 18 U.S.C. § 794(a) and 18 U.S.C. § 794(c) of spying for the Soviet Union and later for the Russian Federation.

In 1997, senior CIA officer Harold James Nicholson was convicted of espionage for the Russians.

In 1998, NSA contractor David Sheldon Boone was charged with having handed over a 600-page technical manual to the Soviets c. 1988–1991 (18 U.S.C. § 794(a)).

In 2000, FBI agent Robert Hanssen was convicted under the Act of spying for the Soviets in the 1980s and Russia in the 1990s.

=== 1990s critiques ===
In the 1990s, Senator Daniel Patrick Moynihan deplored the "culture of secrecy" made possible by the Espionage Act, noting the tendency of bureaucracies to enlarge their powers by increasing the scope of what is held "secret".

In the late 1990s, Wen Ho Lee of Los Alamos National Laboratory (LANL) was indicted under the Act. He and other national security professionals later said he was a "scapegoat" in the government's quest to determine if information about the W88 nuclear warhead had been transferred to China. Lee had made backup copies at LANL of his nuclear weapons simulations code to protect it in case of a system crash. The code was marked PARD, sensitive but not classified. As part of a plea bargain, he pleaded guilty to one count under the Espionage Act. The judge apologized to him for having believed the government. Lee later won more than a million dollars in a lawsuit against the government and several newspapers for their mistreatment of him.

=== 21st century ===
In 2001, retired Army Reserve Colonel George Trofimoff, the most senior U.S. military officer to be indicted under the Act, was convicted of conducting espionage for the Soviets in the 1970s–1990s.

Kenneth Wayne Ford Jr. was indicted under 18 U.S.C. § 793(e) for allegedly having a box of documents in his house after he left NSA employment around 2004. He was sentenced to six years in prison in 2006.

In 2005, Pentagon Iran expert Lawrence Franklin and AIPAC lobbyists Steve Rosen and Keith Weissman were indicted under the Act. Franklin pleaded guilty to conspiracy to disclose national defense information to the lobbyists and an Israeli government official. Franklin was sentenced to more than 12 years in prison, but the sentence was later reduced to 10 months of home confinement.

Under the Obama and first Trump administrations, at least eight Espionage Act prosecutions were related not to traditional espionage but either withholding information or communicating with members of the press. Out of a total of eleven prosecutions under the Espionage Act against government officials accused of providing classified information to the press, seven have occurred since Obama took office. "Leaks related to national security can put people at risk", he said at a news conference in 2013. "They can put men and women in uniform that I've sent into the battlefield at risk. I don't think the American people would expect me, as commander in chief, not to be concerned about information that might compromise their missions or might get them killed." National security and human rights attorney Jesselyn Radack -- who has represented the majority of people charged under the Espionage Act -- argued that her clients were whistleblowers, not spies, and were being targeted over public interest disclosures to the press that are protected under the First Amendment.

Jeffrey Alexander Sterling, a former CIA officer was indicted under the Act in January 2011 for alleged unauthorized disclosure of national defense information to James Risen, a reporter for The New York Times, in 2003. Risen published the leaked material in his 2006 book State of War, which revealed details about the CIA's covert spy war with Iran. Risen refused to reveal the source of his information when subpoenaed twice by the Justice Department. The indictment stated that Sterling's motive was revenge for the CIA's refusal to allow him to publish his memoirs and its refusal to settle his racial discrimination lawsuit against the Agency.

Thomas Andrews Drake – In April 2010, Drake, an official with the NSA, was indicted under 18 U.S.C. § 793(e) for alleged willful retention of national defense information. The case arose from investigations into his communications with Siobhan Gorman of The Baltimore Sun and Diane Roark of the House Intelligence Committee as part of his attempt to blow the whistle on several issues, including the NSA's Trailblazer project. Considering the prosecution of Drake, investigative journalist Jane Mayer wrote: "Because reporters often retain unauthorized defense documents, Drake's conviction would establish a legal precedent making it possible to prosecute journalists as spies."

Shamai Leibowitz – In May 2010, Leibowitz, a translator for the FBI, admitted sharing information with a blogger and pleaded guilty under 18 U.S.C. § 798(a)(3) to one count of disclosure of classified information. As part of a plea bargain, he was sentenced to 20 months in prison.

Stephen Jin-Woo Kim – In August 2010, Kim, a contractor for the State Department and a specialist in nuclear proliferation, was indicted under 18 U.S.C. § 793(d) for alleged disclosure in June 2009 of national defense information to reporter James Rosen of Fox News Channel, related to North Korea's plans to test a nuclear weapon.

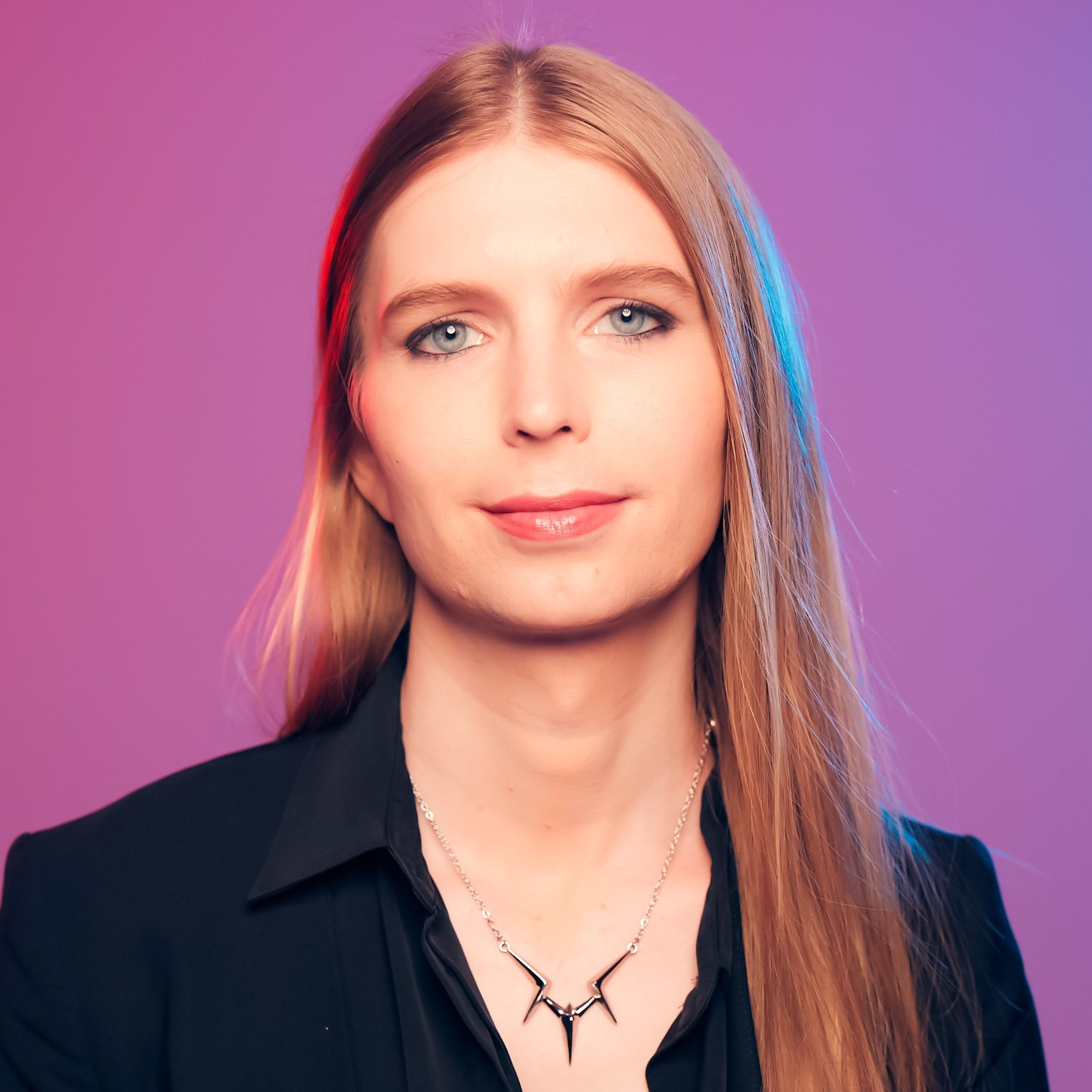
Chelsea Manning, US Army Private First Class convicted in July 2013 on six counts of violating the Espionage Act.

Chelsea Manning – In 2010, Manning, a United States Army Private First Class accused of the largest leak of state secrets in U.S. history, was charged under Article 134 of the Uniform Code of Military Justice, which incorporates parts of the Espionage Act 18 U.S.C. § 793(e). At the time, critics worried that the broad language of the Act could make news organizations, and anyone who reported, printed or disseminated information from WikiLeaks, subject to prosecution, although former prosecutors pushed back, citing Supreme Court precedent expanding First Amendment protections. On July 30, 2013, following a judge-only trial by court-martial lasting eight weeks, Army judge Colonel Denise Lind convicted Manning on six counts of violating the Espionage Act, among other infractions. She was sentenced to serve a 35-year sentence at the maximum-security U.S. Disciplinary Barracks at Fort Leavenworth. On January 17, 2017, President Obama commuted Manning's sentence to nearly seven years of confinement dating from her arrest on May 27, 2010.

John Kiriakou – In January 2012, Kiriakou, former CIA officer and later Democratic staffer on the Senate Foreign Relations Committee, was charged under the Act with leaking information to journalists about the identity of undercover agents, including one who was allegedly involved in waterboarding interrogations of al-Qaeda logistics chief Abu Zubaydah. Kiriakou is alleged to have also disclosed an investigative technique used to capture Zubaydah in Pakistan in 2002. He was sentenced to 30 months in prison on January 25, 2013, and was released in 2015.

Edward Snowden – In June 2013, Snowden was charged under the Espionage Act after releasing documents exposing the NSA's PRISM Surveillance Program. Specifically, he was charged with "unauthorized communication of national defense information" and "willful communication of classified intelligence with an unauthorized person".

Reality Leigh Winner – In June 2017, Winner was arrested and charged with "willful retention and transmission of national defense information", a felony under the Espionage Act. Her arrest was announced on June 5 after The Intercept published an article describing Russian attempts to interfere with the 2016 presidential election, based on classified National Security Agency (NSA) documents leaked to them anonymously. On June 8, 2017, she pleaded not guilty and was denied bail. On June 21, 2018, Winner asked the court to allow her to change her plea to guilty and on June 26 she pleaded guilty to one count of felony transmission of national defense information. Winner's plea agreement with prosecutors called for her to serve five years and three months in prison followed by three years of supervised release. On August 23, 2018, at a federal court in Georgia, Winner was sentenced to the agreed-upon length of time for violating the Espionage Act. Prosecutors said her sentence was the longest ever imposed in federal court for an unauthorized release of government information to the media.

Harold T. Martin — former NSA contractor, sentenced to nine years in prison in 2017, for stealing classified documents and storing them in his home over a period of 20 years.

Terry J. Albury – a 17-year veteran of the FBI, was indicted under the Espionage Act of 1917. In 2018, he pleaded guilty and was sentenced to 4 years in prison. He stated that he was motivated to inform the public about the systematic racist and xenophobic practices he witnessed as the only black agent in the Minneapolis field office, and the son of an Ethiopian refugee as he was tasked with surveillance of Muslim and immigrant communities.

Nghia Pho – a NSA employee who took classified documents home to get extra work done at night and on weekends. After the information was apparently stolen by Russian hackers, he pleaded guilty in 2018 and was sentenced to five-and-a-half years in prison.

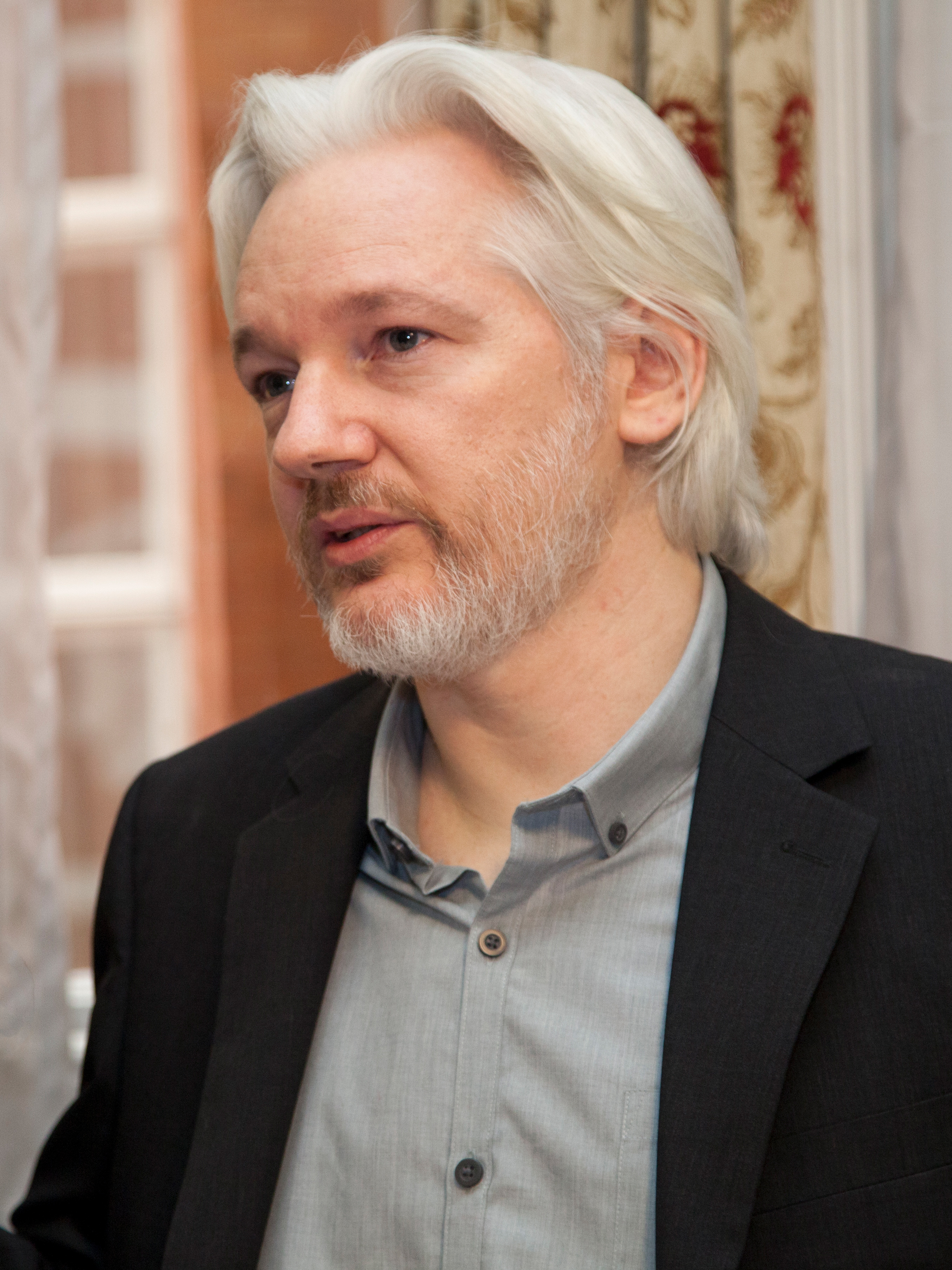
WikiLeaks founder Assange, was released from solitary confinement in a UK prison and convicted in June 2024 on one count of violating the Espionage Act — 14 years after he published US documents that put him in the crosshairs of the US

Julian Assange – On May 23, 2019, the WikiLeaks founder Assange was charged with violating the Espionage Act by seeking classified information. The revelations of war crimes he published about the Iraq and Afghan wars in 2010, were leaked to WikiLeaks by US army intelligence analyst, Chelsea Manning. They were published in cooperation with renowned media organizations such as the New York Times, the Guardian and Der Spiegel, as there was a strong public interest in uncovering those secret. On 24 June 2024 Assange was charged by US prosecutors with “conspiring to unlawfully obtain and disseminate classified information related to the national defense of the United States”. Assange pleaded guilty to the specific charge, which is a violation of 18 USC, section 793(g). After 14 long years of legal battles, political advocacy and ongoing campaigning, his pleading before a US court in Saipan, an unincorporated territory of the US in the Pacific, was part of a US deal, for which the judge considered his sentence served due to the five years he spent in the maximum security prison Belmarsh in the United Kingdom in solitary confinement. The case has been described as having significant implications for the First Amendment in the US and press freedom around the world. This Espionage Act conviction that Assange pleaded guilty to is a threat to journalists all over the world if they publish this sort of information, the US can use their Espionage act to reach into any territory in the world and charge them. Assange himself is an Australian citizen, not a US citizen. Prime Minister of Australia Anthony Albanese, leader of the Labor government in Australia that came to power in mid-2022, had changed almost a decade of official passivity on the Assange case by the conservative governments that preceded him. The US secret documents on the actions of the United States Army in Afghanistan and Iraq included the video „Collateral Murder“ of a helicopter attack on civilians in 2007, in which 12-18+ people were killed - including two Reuters journalists and 2 children badly injured. The serious war crimes that he uncovered in 2010 and 2011 remained unpunished.

Daniel Hale – in 2019, US Air Force veteran and military contractor Hale was indicted on three charges under the Espionage Act for leaking classified documents about the US military's drone program to a journalist. The journalist was not named in the indictment but is likely to be a reference to Jeremy Scahill, a journalist for The Intercept, who wrote Dirty Wars: The World Is a Battlefield and published the Drone Papers. In April 2021, Hale pleaded guilty to one count, under the Espionage Act, of unlawful retention and transmission of "national defense information". The prosecution asked that a trial on the remaining charges be postponed until after sentencing.

Jack Teixeira – Teixeira is alleged to have regularly shared classified information on the online chat service Discord on a server called "Thug Shaker Central", parsed from documents he read, according to The Washington Post. According to The New York Times, some chat members struggled to understand the summaries or did not take them seriously. In October 2022, Teixeira is alleged to have posted the first of several sets of classified documents on the server.

Robert L. Birchum – On June 1, 2023, retired USAF Lt.Col Birchum was sentenced under the espionage act for unlawfully possessing and retaining classified documents. Though there was no evidence of his ever having made an unauthorized disclosure of any of the material (which included more than 300 documents in all, including two classified Top Secret/SCI) and pled guilty, he was sentenced to three years imprisonment in Federal court in Tampa, FL.

Donald Trump – On June 8, 2023, former President Trump was indicted on 31 counts of willful retention of national defense information, and a further six counts relating to obstruction, conspiracy, and concealing documents in a Federal investigation. He had been under investigation since at least May 2022, a grand jury subpoena was issued for return of the documents on May 11, 2022. On August 8, 2022, the FBI raided his Mar-a-Lago home and found classified material. That classified material allegedly included materials related to nuclear weapons. The Justice Department also became concerned that Trump was storing official presidential records at his home in violation of the Presidential Records Act which mandates that all presidential documents be preserved and submitted to the National Archives. Federal Judge Aileen Cannon dismissed the case in July 2024, finding Jack Smith's appointment as special prosecutor in the case unlawful. The Justice Department dismissed its appeal of Cannon's decision following Trump's win in the 2024 Presidential election.

== Criticism ==
Some have criticized the use of the Espionage Act against national security leakers. A 2015 study by the PEN American Center found that almost all of the non-government representatives they interviewed, including activists, lawyers, journalists, and whistleblowers, "thought the Espionage Act had been used inappropriately in leak cases that have a public interest component". PEN wrote: "Experts described it as 'too blunt an instrument,' 'aggressive, broad and suppressive,' a 'tool of intimidation,' 'chilling of free speech,' and a 'poor vehicle for prosecuting leakers and whistleblowers.'"

Pentagon Papers whistleblower Daniel Ellsberg said, "the current state of whistleblowing prosecutions under the Espionage Act makes a truly fair trial wholly unavailable to an American who has exposed classified wrongdoing", and that "legal scholars have strongly argued that the US Supreme Court – which has never yet addressed the constitutionality of applying the Espionage Act to leaks to the American public – should find the use of it overbroad and unconstitutional in the absence of a public interest defense". Professor at American University Washington College of Law and national security law expert Stephen Vladeck has said that the law “lacks the hallmarks of a carefully and precisely defined statutory restriction on speech". Trevor Timm, executive director of the Freedom of the Press Foundation, said, "basically any information the whistleblower or source would want to bring up at trial to show that they are not guilty of violating the Espionage Act the jury would never hear. It's almost a certainty that because the law is so broadly written that they would be convicted no matter what." Attorney Jesselyn Radack, who has represented four whistleblowers charged under the Espionage Act, notes that the law was enacted "35 years before the word 'classification' entered the government's lexicon" and believes that "under the Espionage Act, no prosecution of a non-spy can be fair or just". She added that mounting a legal defense to the Espionage Act is estimated to "cost $1 million to $3 million". In May 2019, the Pittsburgh Post-Gazette editorial board published an opinion piece making the case for an amendment to allow a public-interest defense, as "the act has since become a tool of suppression, used to punish whistleblowers who expose governmental wrongdoing and criminality".

In an interview with Fairness & Accuracy in Reporting, journalist Chip Gibbons said that it was "almost impossible, if not impossible, to mount a defense" against charges under the Espionage Act. Gibbons said defendants are not allowed to use the term "whistleblower", mention the First Amendment, raise the issue of over-classification of documents, or explain the reasons for their actions.

== See also ==
Related law

- Alien and Sedition Acts (late 18th century)
- Executive Order 9835 (President Truman)
- Intelligence Identities Protection Act
- Non-Detention Act (1971)
- Economic Espionage Act of 1996
- Moynihan Commission on Government Secrecy

Related persons

- Seymour Stedman
- Lynne Stewart
- Rose Pastor Stokes
- Marie Equi
