= Dz (digraph) =

Digraph of the Latin script

Latin Dz digraph.

Dz is a digraph of the Latin script, consisting of the consonants D and Z. It generally represents /d͡z/ in Latin alphabets, including Hungarian, Kashubian, Latvian, Lithuanian, Polish, Slovak, and romanized Macedonian. However, it represents /t͡s/ in Chipewyan (Dënesųłinë́) and the ILE romanization of Cantonese, and is a pronunciation respelling of the letter D to represent /z/ in Vietnamese.

== Usage by language ==
=== Esperanto ===
Some Esperanto grammars, notably Plena Analiza Gramatiko de Esperanto, consider dz to be a digraph for the voiced affricate [d͡z], as in edzo "husband". The case for this is "rather weak". Most Esperantists, including Esperantist linguists (Janton, Wells), reject it.

=== Hungarian ===
⟨Dz⟩ is the seventh letter of the Hungarian alphabet. It is called dzé (IPA: [d͡zeː]) as a letter of the alphabet, where it represents the voiced alveolar affricate phoneme /dz/.

⟨Dz⟩ and ⟨dzs⟩ were recognized as individual letters in the 11th edition of Hungarian orthography (1984). Prior to that, they were analyzed as two-letter combinations ⟨d⟩+⟨z⟩ and ⟨d⟩+⟨zs⟩.

==== Length ====
Like most Hungarian consonants, the sound /dz/ can be geminated. However, the letter is only doubled in writing (to ⟨ddz⟩) when an assimilated suffix is added to the stem: eddze, lopóddzon.

In several words, it is pronounced long, e.g. bodza, madzag, edz, pedz. In some other ones, short, e.g. dzadzíki, dzéta, Dzerzsinszkij (usually at the beginning of words), though it is always short after another consonant (e.g. in brindza).

In several verbs ending in -dzik (approximately fifty), there is a free alternation with -zik, e.g. csókolódzik or csókolózik, lopódzik or lopózik. In other verbs, there is no variation: birkózik, mérkőzik (only with ⟨z⟩) but leledzik, nyáladzik (only with ⟨dz⟩, pronounced long). In some other verbs, there is a difference in meaning: levelez(ik) "to correspond", but leveledzik "to produce leaves".

==== Collation ====
Usage of this letter is similar to that of Polish and Slovak languages: though ⟨dz⟩ is a digraph composed of ⟨d⟩ and ⟨z⟩, it is considered one letter, and even acronyms keep the letter intact.

=== Polish ===
Dz generally represents [d͡z]. However, when followed by i it is palatalized to [d͡ʑ].

==== Examples of dz ====
dzwon (bell)
rodzaj (kind, type)

Compare dz followed by i:
dziecko (child)
dziewczyna (girl, girlfriend)

=== Slovak ===
In Slovak, the digraph dz is the ninth letter of the Slovak alphabet. Example words with this phoneme include:

- medzi = between, among
- hrádza = dam, dike

The digraph may never be divided by hyphenation:

- medzi → me-dzi
- hrádza → hrá-dza

However, when d and z come from different morphemes, they are treated as separate letters, and must be divided by hyphenation:

- odzemok = type of folk dance → od-ze-mok
- nadzvukový = supersonic → nad-zvu-ko-vý

In both cases od- (from) and nad- (above) are a prefix to the stems zem (earth) and zvuk (sound).

=== Vietnamese ===
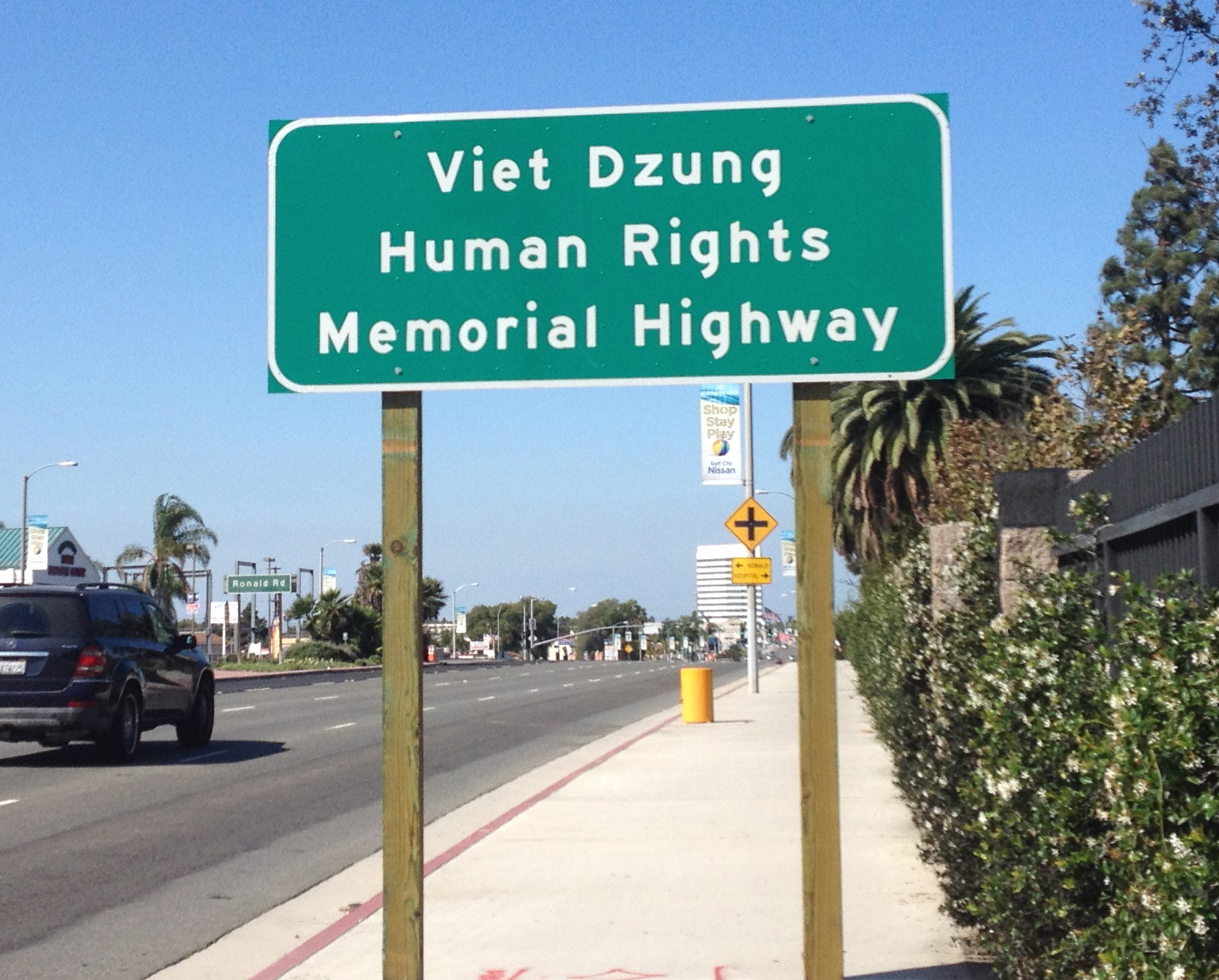
California State Route 39 in Little Saigon, Orange County, is named after Vietnamese-American singer-songwriter Việt Dzũng, born Nguyễn Ngọc Hùng Dũng.

Dz is sometimes used in Vietnamese names as a pronunciation respelling of the letter D. Several common Vietnamese given names start with the letter D, including Dũng, Dụng, and Dương. Whereas D is pronounced as some sort of dental or alveolar stop in most Latin alphabets, an unadorned D in the Vietnamese alphabet represents either /z/ (Northern Vietnamese) or /j/ (Southern Vietnamese), while the letter Đ represents a voiced alveolar implosive (/ɗ/) or, according to Thompson (1959), a preglottalized voiced alveolar stop (/ʔd/). Z is not included in the Vietnamese alphabet as a letter in its own right.

Many Vietnamese cultural figures spell their family names, pen names, or stage names with Dz instead of D, emphasizing the northern pronunciation. Examples include the songwriter Dzoãn Mẫn, the poet Hồ Dzếnh, and the television chef Nguyễn Dzoãn Cẩm Vân. Other examples include Bùi Dzinh and Trương Đình Dzu.

Some Overseas Vietnamese residing in English-speaking countries also replace D with Dz in their names. A male named Dũng may spell his name ǲung to avoid being called "dung" in social contexts. Examples of this usage include Vietnamese-Americans Việt Dzũng and Dzung Tran. (Occasionally, D is instead replaced by Y to emphasize the Saigonese pronunciation, as with Yung Krall.)

== Unicode ==
Dz is represented in Unicode as three separate glyphs within the Latin Extended-B block. It is one of the rare characters that has separate glyphs for each of its uppercase, title case, and lowercase forms.

Code	Glyph	Decimal	Description
U+01F1	Ǳ	&#497;	Latin Capital Letter DZ
U+01F2	ǲ	&#498;	Latin Capital Letter D with Small Letter Z
U+01F3	ǳ	&#499;	Latin Small Letter DZ

The single-character versions are designed for compatibility with Yugoslav encodings supporting Romanization of Macedonian, where this digraph corresponds to the Cyrillic letter Ѕ.

=== Variants ===
Additional variants of the ǲ digraph are also encoded in Unicode.

- U+01C5 ǅ LATIN CAPITAL LETTER D WITH SMALL LETTER Z WITH CARON is used in the Croatian, Bosnian, and Slovak alphabets as a letter in its own right.
- U+01C4 Ǆ LATIN CAPITAL LETTER DZ WITH CARON is the all-capitals form of U+01C5 (ǅ).
- U+01C6 ǆ LATIN SMALL LETTER DZ WITH CARON is the lowercase form of U+01C5 (ǅ).
- U+02A3 ʣ LATIN SMALL LETTER DZ DIGRAPH was historically used to represent the voiced alveolar affricate in the International Phonetic Alphabet.
- U+10787 𐞇 MODIFIER LETTER SMALL DZ DIGRAPH is the superscript form of U+02A3 and is an IPA superscript letter
- U+02A5 ʥ LATIN SMALL LETTER DZ DIGRAPH WITH CURL was historically used to represent the voiced alveolo-palatal affricate in the IPA.
- U+10789 𐞉 MODIFIER LETTER SMALL DZ DIGRAPH WITH CURL is the superscript form of U+02A5 and is an IPA superscript letter
- U+AB66 ꭦ LATIN SMALL LETTER DZ DIGRAPH WITH RETROFLEX HOOK is used in Sinological and Tibetanist transcription for a voiced retroflex affricate.
- U+10788 𐞈 MODIFIER LETTER SMALL DZ DIGRAPH WITH RETROFLEX HOOK is the superscript form of U+AB66 and is an IPA superscript letter
- U+02A4 ʤ LATIN SMALL LETTER DEZH DIGRAPH is a ligature of lowercase d and ezh (a z with a tail), formerly used in the IPA
- U+1078A 𐞊 MODIFIER LETTER SMALL DEZH DIGRAPH is the superscript form of U+02A4 and is an IPA superscript letter
- U+1DF12 𝼒 LATIN SMALL LETTER DEZH DIGRAPH WITH PALATAL HOOK is used in phonetic transcription
- U+1DF19 𝼙 LATIN SMALL LETTER DEZH DIGRAPH WITH RETROFLEX HOOK has been used in phonetic descriptions of Polish
