= 2013 articles about the Department of Justice investigations of reporters =

In 2013, the United States Department of Justice, under Attorney General Eric Holder, came under scrutiny from the media and some members of Congress for subpoenaing phone records from the Associated Press (AP). Under similar justifications, a 2010 subpoena approved by Eric Holder implicated Fox News reporter, James Rosen, as a possible co-conspirator under the Espionage Act of 1917. Investigators gained access to the times of his phone calls, and two days of Rosen's emails. Stephen Jin-Woo Kim eventually pleaded guilty to violating the Espionage Act for communicating North Korean nuclear test plans to Rosen. These investigations provoked considerable criticism from major news organizations, and precipitated the revision of media guidelines at the Department of Justice.

== Associated Press ==
On May 13, 2013, the Associated Press announced telephone records for 20 of their reporters during a two-month period in 2012 had been subpoenaed by the Justice Department. AP reported the Justice Department would not say why it sought the records, but news sources noted the US Attorney's office for the District of Columbia was conducting a criminal investigation into a May 7, 2012 Associated Press story about a CIA operation which prevented the Yemeni terrorist Fahd al-Quso's plot to detonate an explosive device on a commercial flight. The DOJ did not direct subpoenas to the Associated Press; instead, the subpoenas were issued to their telephone providers, including Verizon Wireless.

The AP claimed these acts were a "massive and unprecedented intrusion" into news-gathering operations. Gary Pruitt, CEO of the Associated Press stated: "These records potentially reveal communications with confidential sources across all of the newsgathering activities undertaken by the AP during a two-month period, provide a road map to AP's newsgathering operations and disclose information about AP's activities and operations that the government has no conceivable right to know."

The US Attorney's office in Washington responded that federal investigators seek records from news outlets only after making "every reasonable effort to obtain information through alternative means." Verizon neither challenged the subpoena nor did it try to alert the journalists whose records were being requested. Debra Lewis, Verizon Wireless spokeswoman, said the company "complies with legal processes for requests for information by law enforcement."

== James Rosen ==
On May 17, 2013, the Washington Post reported the Justice Department had monitored reporter Rosen's activities by tracking his visits to the State Department, through phone traces, timing of calls and his personal emails in a probe regarding possible news leaks of classified information in 2009 about North Korea. In obtaining the warrants, they labeled Rosen a "possible co-conspirator" with Stephen Kim.

In a written statement, the Justice Department said it had followed "all applicable laws, regulations, and longstanding Department of Justice policies intended to safeguard the First Amendment interests of the press in reporting the news and the public in receiving it."

Some analysts have described the Justice Department's actions as "aggressive investigative methods" that have a chilling effect on news organizations' ability to play a watchdog role. Fox News contributor Judge Andrew Napolitano commented: "This is the first time that the federal government has moved to this level of taking ordinary, reasonable, traditional, lawful reporter skills and claiming they constitute criminal behavior."

An editorial board of the New York Times wrote: "With the decision to label a Fox News television reporter a possible 'co-conspirator' in a criminal investigation of a news leak, the Obama administration has moved beyond protecting government secrets to threatening fundamental freedoms of the press to gather news."

Dana Milbank of the Washington Post stated: "The Rosen affair is as flagrant an assault on civil liberties as anything done by George W. Bush's administration, and it uses technology to silence critics in a way Richard Nixon could only have dreamed of. To treat a reporter as a criminal for doing his job — seeking out information the government doesn't want made public — deprives Americans of the First Amendment freedom on which all other constitutional rights are based."

== Department of Justice ==
Days prior on May 15, 2013, Attorney General Holder had testified under oath in front of the House Judiciary Committee that he had recused himself from the leak investigations to avoid any appearance of a conflict of interest. Holder said his Deputy Attorney General, James M. Cole, was in charge of the AP investigation and would have ordered the subpoenas. When questioning turned to the possibility of journalists being charged under the Espionage Act for reporting classified material, Holder stated: "With regard to the potential prosecution of the press for the disclosure of material, that is not something that I've ever been involved in, heard of or would think would be a wise policy."

On May 23, 2013, NBC confirmed with the Justice Department that Holder had personally signed off on the Rosen case. The Justice Department defended their decision and spoke about a balance between protecting national secrets and the 1st Amendment, stating: "After extensive deliberations, and after following all applicable laws, regulations and policies, the Department sought an appropriately tailored search warrant under the Privacy Protection Act." The revelation brought into question whether Holder was being intentionally misleading during his previous testimony when he denied knowing of, or being part of possible prosecutions of journalists. House Committee members sent an open letter to Holder, saying: "It is imperative that the committee, the Congress, and the American people be provided a full and accurate account of your involvement."

== Perception ==
Members of Congress and media figures have questioned the motivations behind the Justice Department's actions, and if they were even warranted: "For five days, reporters at the Associated Press had been sitting on a big scoop about a foiled Al-Qaeda plot at the request of CIA officials. Then, in a hastily scheduled Monday morning meeting, the journalists were asked by agency officials to hold off on publishing the story for just one more day. The CIA officials, who had initially cited national security concerns in an attempt to delay publication, no longer had those worries, according to individuals familiar with the exchange. Instead, the Obama administration was planning to announce the successful counterterrorism operation that Tuesday. AP balked and proceeded to publish that Monday afternoon."

On June 19, 2013, while giving a speech at the National Press Club, President and CEO of the Associated Press Gary Pruitt said: "Some longtime trusted sources have become nervous and anxious about talking with us — even on stories unrelated to national security. In some cases, government employees we once checked in with regularly will no longer speak to us by phone. Others are reluctant to meet in person... And I can tell you, that this chilling effect on newsgathering is not just limited to AP. Journalists from other news organizations have personally told me, that it has intimidated both official and nonofficial sources from speaking to them as well."

== Aftermath ==
The U.S. Department of Justice undertook a comprehensive evaluation of their practices and policies regarding issuing subpoenas, search warrants and court orders to obtain records or information from journalists, meeting with stakeholders in the news media, First Amendment advocates, and members of the Congress. The DOJ published a six-page report of the review entitled "Report on Revised Media Guidelines" on July 12, 2013. Holder said the "revised guidelines help ensure the proper balance is struck when pursuing investigations into unauthorized disclosures" and that these "reforms will make a meaningful difference". He claimed that "there are additional protections that only Congress can provide" alluding to media shield legislation. Media lawyers involved in the negotiations of the revised guidelines called them a significant progress, but the reactions of journalists were mixed. David E. Sanger, veteran chief Washington correspondent of The New York Times, for example stated that the revised guidelines were "just formalizing what was observed in past administrations. The guidelines worked pretty well until the Obama administration came in." On February 24, 2014 the Attorney General Eric Holder signed the final new rules that lay down the guidelines for the U.S. Department of Justice on seeking information from journalists. The Attorney General's Order No. 3420-2014 mentions it lays down the "Policy regarding obtaining information from, or records of, members of the news media; and regarding questioning, arresting, or charging members of the news media."

== See also ==
- NSA warrantless surveillance controversy
- Mass surveillance
