= Irvin C. Scarbeck =

Irvin Chambers Scarbeck (born May 8, 1920) was a US State Department official who was convicted of giving information to Polish UB (secret police) during the Cold War after he became involved in a romantic affair with a Polish woman and was blackmailed by Polish intelligence agents. His case was the first prosecution under Title 50 783(b) of the Subversive Activities Control Act. His case also prompted a modification of the Espionage Act of 1917 to allow it to be used outside U.S. territory.

== History ==
Scarbeck was a student at City College of New York and New York University. He served in the United States Army from 1942-1946 and became a staff sergeant. In 1956, he went to work at the State Department, where he won an award for meritorious service. In 1958 he was deployed to the U.S. embassy in Warsaw, Poland, as an office manager. His wife, daughter, and two sons joined him there. He loved taking family trips in the countryside and enjoyed music. He was well liked by his staff.

In 1959, aged 39, he became involved in a romantic affair with 22-year-old Urszula Maria Discher. He got her an apartment and often visited her there. In 1960, agents of the Polish Security Service surprised the two in bed and took photographs. The ministry then used the photos to blackmail Scarbeck into giving them secret information from the US government. He later claimed that the secret police had also threatened Ms. Discher with arrest and prosecution. By cooperating with the ministry, he said that he was able to save her from a terrible fate. He managed to enable her escape to West Germany, where he found an apartment for her, and gave her some money to help her.

The FBI arrested him on June 13, 1961. In July 1961 a grand jury in the U.S. District Court of the District of Columbia indicted him on one count of taking a government document under 18 U.S.C. § 2071 and three counts under 50 U.S.C. § 783(b). This was the first prosecution ever under 783(b). The law had been created as part of the McCarran Internal Security Act / Subversive Activities Control Act of 1950 during the Red Scare of the 1950s by Senator Karl Earl Mundt. Mundt claimed it was a reaction to the Alger Hiss, Elizabeth Bentley, and similar cases. It is one of the few Federal statutes that criminalizes delivering classified information. He was found guilty of the Title 50 counts but not guilty of the Title 18 count. In November 1961 he was sentenced to three consecutive terms of 10 years in prison, the maximum penalty the law allowed. His wife said she would "stick by him".

He tried to appeal his conviction to the U.S. Supreme Court. His lawyers argued that the phrase "classified documents" did not include documents classified by an Ambassador, only those classified by the President; that Scarbeck should have been able to challenge the classification; that Scarbeck was authorized to disclose the documents; that his confession was coerced and therefore inadmissible, and his confession was not corroborated by other facts. The Supreme Court denied to hear the case in June 1963. However the consecutive sentences were made concurrent and Scarbeck was paroled in 1966.

== Effect on Espionage Act ==
Scarbeck's case was cited by Congressman Richard Poff as a reason to amend the Espionage Act of 1917 in 1961. He pointed out that Scarbeck could not be prosecuted under the Act because it originally contained language making it apply only to acts committed inside U.S. territory. Poff's solution was to repeal the restrictive language (Section 791) so that the Espionage Act would apply everywhere. The Senate passed Poff's bill only after a third attempt.

== See also ==
- Gorin v. United States
- McCarran Internal Security Act
- Espionage Act of 1917
