= Gorin v. United States =

- Supreme Court of the United States

Argued December 19, 1940 Decided January 13, 1941
- Full case name: Gorin v. United States; Together with No. 88, Salich v. United States, also on certiorari, 310 U.S. 622, to the Circuit Court of Appeals for the Ninth Circuit
- Citations: 312 U.S. 19 (more) 61 S. Ct. 429; 85 L. Ed. 488; 1941 U.S. LEXIS 1033

Case history
- Prior: 111 F.2d 712 (9th Cir. 1940)

Court membership
- Chief Justice Charles E. Hughes Associate Justices James C. McReynolds · Harlan F. Stone; Owen Roberts · Hugo Black; Stanley F. Reed · Felix Frankfurter; William O. Douglas · Frank Murphy

Case opinion
- Majority: Reed, joined by Hughes, McReynolds, Stone, Roberts, Black, Frankfurter, Douglas
- Murphy took no part in the consideration or decision of the case.

Gorin v. United States, 312 U.S. 19 (1941), was a United States Supreme Court case. It involved the Espionage Act of 1917 and its use against Mihail Gorin, an intelligence agent from the Soviet Union, and Hafis Salich, a United States Navy employee who sold to Gorin information on Japanese activity in the U.S.

== Background ==
Hafis Salich was a Georgian immigrant who had worked in the Berkeley Police Department and knew some Japanese. In 1936, he became a civilian employee of the Office of Naval Intelligence (ONI) working in ONI's branch office in San Pedro, California.

Mihail Gorin moved to the US in 1936, and operated the Los Angeles office of the Soviet tourist agency Intourist. He was also an intelligence agent of the Soviet Union. Gorin met Salich in 1937. Salich had access to ONI's files on pro-Japan activities among Japanese-Americans and the covert activities of Japanese consular officials. He was also short of money because of gambling losses.

By 1938, Gorin persuaded Salich to sell him classified information from ONI covering US monitoring of Japanese officials and also private persons (Japanese-American citizens and resident aliens). Salich agreed by justifying his action on the theory that Japan was a 'common enemy' of the Soviet Union and the United States.

George Ohashi, of San Diego, is reported to have made a statement at a JACL meeting that he was not a fascist. Couple other members, Paul Nakadate and George Suzuki took esception (sic) to this remark and accused George Ohashi of being a communist and subsequently beat him up.

— portion of the note found in Gorin's pants.

Gorin and Salich were caught in late 1938, when Gorin left a spy note and cash in clothes sent for dry cleaning. The dry cleaners checked the pockets of all clothes before cleaning and found the money and note. They immediately contacted police, who contacted Ralph Van Deman, a former head of Army intelligence. Van Deman in turn informed the FBI, which investigated Salich and Gorin and obtained a confession from Salich.

== Indictment and prosecution ==
In January 1939, Gorin and his wife, Natasha, as well as Salich, were indicted under the Espionage Act of 1917. The Act was then under Title 50 of the US Code. There were three counts against each defendant:

- Count One: USC 50 §31 Copying, taking, making and obtaining documents, writings and notes of matters connected with the national defense (§1 of the Act).
- Count Two: USC 50 §32 Communicating, delivering and transmitting to Gorin as a representative of the Soviet Union writings, notes, instruments and information relating to the national defense (§2 of the Act).
- Count Three: USC 50 §34 Conspiring to communicate, deliver, transmit, and attempt to communicate, deliver and transmit to the Soviet Union and to a representative thereof, documents, writings, plans, notes, instruments and information relating to the national defense (§4 of the Act).

All defendants pleaded not guilty. The defense had several main arguments:

- The Espionage Act of 1917 was too vague in its description of what information was considered illegal and so violated the due process clause of the Fifth Amendment and "the right... to be informed of the nature and cause of the accusation" provided in the Sixth Amendment.
- The "innocuous" nature of the documents meant there was no intent to harm the US or to aid a foreign nation.
- The information trafficked in by the defendant was not related to the national defense.
- Courts, not juries, should decide whether information is "connected or related" to national defense
- Some of the information was later published in a periodical and so not secret.

The jury rejected the arguments and convicted Gorin and Salich on all three counts. Gorin got six years and Salich got four years. The Court instructed the jury to find Natasha not guilty of the first two counts, and the jury also found her not guilty of the third count.

The case was appealed in the Ninth Circuit Court of Appeals in April 1940. The case was heard by Judges Garrecht, Haney, and Healy, who rejected all of defense counsel's arguments.

The case then went to the Supreme Court. It was argued in December 1940 and decided in January 1941. The Supreme Court agreed with the Court of Appeals and rejected all of defense counsel's arguments.

== Legal principles considered ==
Several important legal principles involving the Espionage Act were discussed in Justice Stanley Forman Reed's opinion for the Court:

- The act covers "obtaining" as well as "delivery" of information.
- The act covers information "connected or related" to national defense, not only specific items listed (ships, aircraft, forts, etc.).
- The definition of "national defense'" is that of the Defense Secrets Act of 1911, "a generic concept of broad connotations, referring to the military and naval establishments and the related activities of national preparedness."
- The jury, not the court, is to decide whether or not information was "connected or related" to national defense.
- The vagueness and uncertainty of the law does not violate the Fifth or Sixth Amendments.
- Sections 1(b) and 2 require "bad faith" (scienter). The defendant must have "intent or reason to believe that the information to be obtained is to be used to the injury of the United States, or to the advantage of any foreign nation."
- Congress meant any foreign nation: "No distinction is made between friend or enemy."
- If there is no "occasion for secrecy" as with public Congressional reports, there can be no "reasonable intent to give advantage to a foreign government."

Gorin was cited in the 1971 case New York Times v. United States. The government also used Gorin in its arguments in the case of Stephen Jin-Woo Kim in 2010.
