= Defense Secrets Act of 1911 =

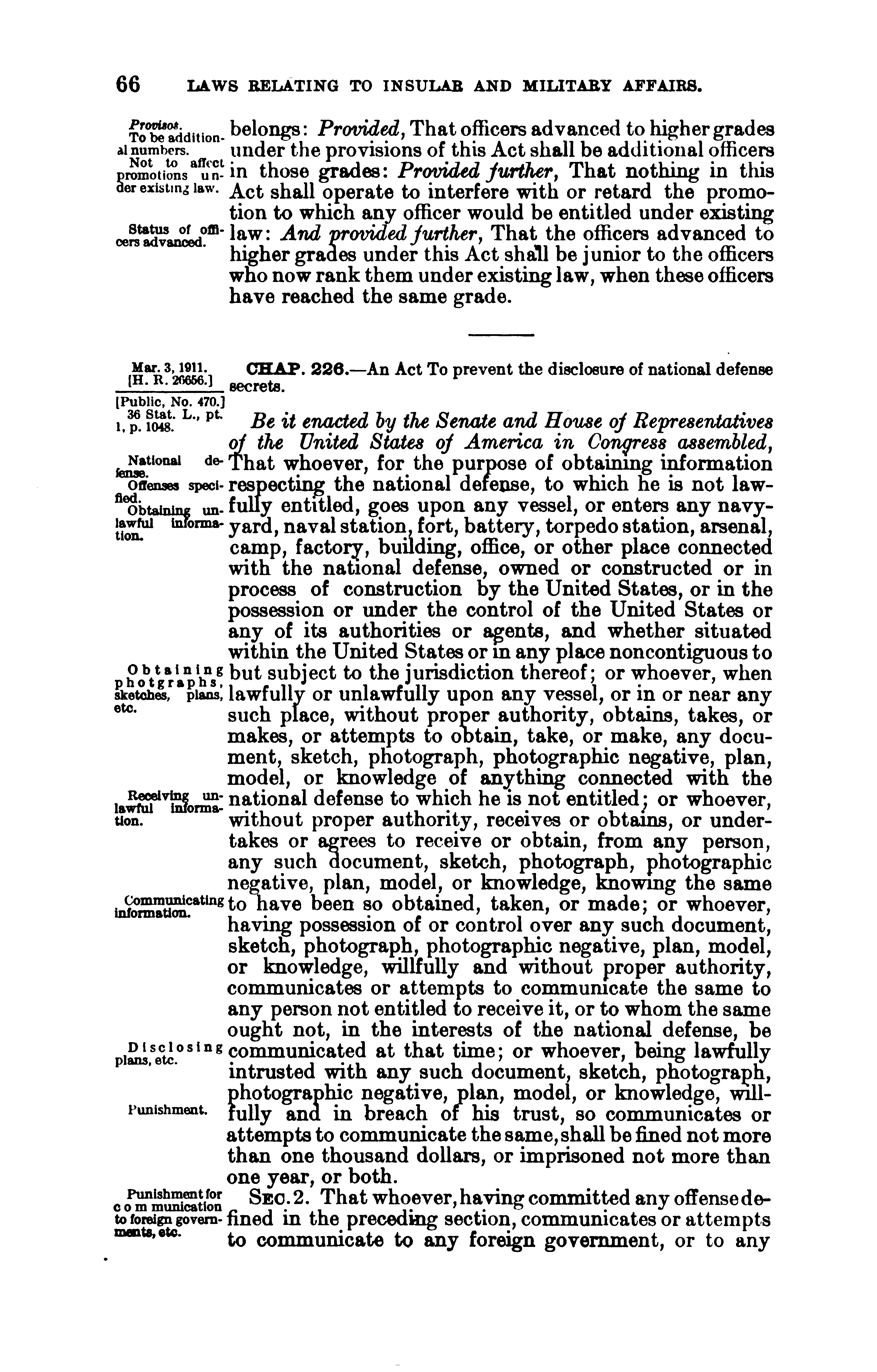

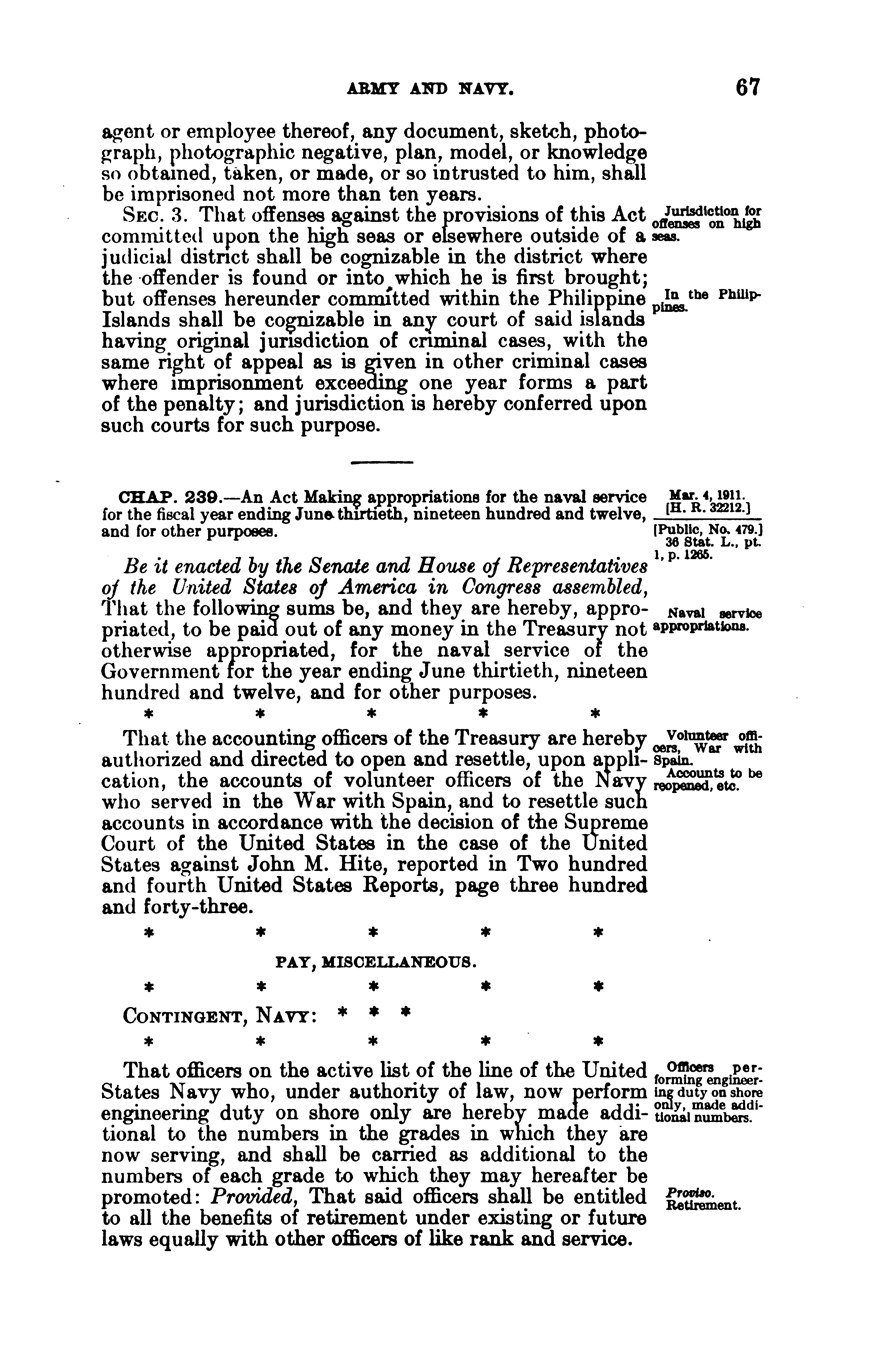

The Defense Secrets Act of 1911 (Pub. L. 61–470) was one of the first laws in the United States specifically criminalizing the disclosure of government secrets. It was based in part on the British Official Secrets Act 1889 and criminalized obtaining or delivering "information respecting the national defense, to which he is not lawfully entitled". Much of the language of the 1911 law was re-used in the Espionage Act of 1917, still in force.

== History ==
Reuben Moon reported on the US House of Representatives version of the bill, HR 26656, in January 1911. His stated purpose for bringing the bill forward were several cases of Espionage that went unprosecuted because the United States, unlike other countries at the time, lacked any anti-Espionage law. He gave examples from the Panama Canal, the Philippines, and elsewhere, in which sketches or blueprints of military installations had been available to foreign parties, sometimes for money. He also cited recent wars, like the Russo-Japanese War, where he argued knowledge of the enemy had been decisive.

The act was entitled "An Act to prevent the disclosure of national defense secrets". It was approved on March 3, 1911. At the time, the United States, under general John J. Pershing, and President William Howard Taft, was fighting the Moro Rebellion in the southern Philippines, a fallout from the Spanish–American War of 10 years earlier. The law specifically mentioned the Philippines.

The language of the 1911 act, especially the notion of information 'relating' to the 'national defense' being obtained or delivered to 'those not entitled to receive it', was retained through subsequent American secrecy laws, including the Espionage Act of 1917 and the McCarran Internal Security Act of 1950. Many later Espionage Act cases, for example Gorin v. United States, involved arguments about the exact meaning of terms like 'national defense'.

== Brief history of US government secrecy ==
Ericson argues that historically the US government had been somewhat lax regarding secrecy. For example, Thomas Paine in 1777 published information from the Committee of Secret Correspondence about France's aid to the American revolutionary war effort; he was simply fired. Alexis de Tocqueville also commented on the casual nature in which he was given original documents into his permanent possession just by asking for them. The storage of documents was haphazard as well. President Jackson even proclaimed he did not care if his political enemies obtained his documents.

However, there was a death penalty implemented for certain forms of spying during the Revolutionary War; for more information please see: Intelligence in the American Revolutionary War.

The 1869 "General Orders no. 35" limited collection of information about fortifications, and this was expanded at the time of the Spanish–American War in the late 1890s. Edgar and Schmidt write that when the DSA was passed, the few state secrets laws that existed (35 Stat 1038 and 35 Stat 1097 (1909)) related to "treason, unlawful entry into military bases, and theft of government property".

== Text of the law ==
As the laws have been revised, the original act has disappeared or been modified. Thus, the actual text of the act can only be obtained by looking at previous versions of the law. The text of the original Section 1 can be found in the images scanned at right, or reproduced in the US v Rosen opinion of 2006, linked in the 'External Links' section below.

== See also ==
- Intelligence in the American Revolutionary War
- Espionage Act of 1917
- McCarran Internal Security Act of 1950
- Computer Fraud and Abuse Act 1980s (inherited some language from DSA)
