= Ronald Humphrey =

Ronald Humphrey (born c. 1936) was a United States Information Agency (USIA) official who was convicted of spying for North Vietnam. He and co-conspirator David Truong (born Truong Dinh Hung), the son of a South Vietnamese politician Trương Đình Dzu, were arrested in 1977 and charged with conspiracy, espionage, theft of classified information and failing to register as foreign agents. They were convicted of spying for the North Vietnamese and both given a 15-year prison sentence.

Truong was a South Vietnamese expatriate living in the United States who was active in the anti-Vietnam War movement. His father had run against Nguyen Van Thieu on a peace platform. Supplied with information by Humphrey, Truong passed on diplomatic cables and classified information to North Vietnam and the successor Socialist Republic of Vietnam government. The intermediary was the wife of a naval attaché, Yung Krall, codenamed "Agent Keyseat", who was a double agent for the U.S. intelligence services. Some of the documents were used by the North Vietnamese and Viet Cong negotiators at the Paris Peace Conference. It is the only case of military espionage to come out of the Vietnam War.
