= David Truong =

South Vietnamese activist (1945–2014)

David Truong (born Trương Đình Hùng, September 2, 1945 – June 26, 2014) was a South Vietnamese national who lived in the United States and partook in the anti-Vietnam War protest movement. Truong was the son of South Vietnamese politician Trương Đình Dzu, a candidate for the presidency in the 1967 elections against Nguyễn Văn Thiệu. Dzu advocated negotiating with the Viet Cong to end the war. Truong and his co-conspirator Ronald Humphrey were arrested in January 1978 for passing diplomatic cables and classified information to the commmunist government of the newly unified Vietnam in 1976 and 1977. They were convicted of espionage in May 1978.

He was born in Saigon and also had a sister, Monique Truong Miller. In the 1960s he studied in Stanford University in the United States, having previously studied in Paris. After his conviction, Truong began his prison sentence in 1982 and was paroled in 1986.

In 1981, he married American economist Carolyn Gates and after Truong's release the couple lived in the Netherlands and later Malaysia. He taught economics and worked as an economic development consultant for the European Commission. David Truong died from cancer in June 2014 in a hospital in Penang, Malaysia.

== Spying for Vietnam ==
Truong was arrested in January 1978, and a search of his apartment revealed two Top Secret State Department documents in his possession. The documents had been provided to him by Humphrey, a United States Information Agency employee, to be passed on by Truong to Vietnam via a woman who turned out to be a double agent for the CIA and FBI. The spy ring routed purloined classified information through Vietnam's United Nations mission in New York and its French Embassy in Paris. In retaliation, the American government, which lacked formal diplomatic relations with Vietnam at the time, expelled Đinh Bá Thi, Vietnam's UN legate, from the U.S. Thi had been named an unindicted co-conspirator when Truong and his accomplice, United States Information Agency employee Ronald Humphrey, were indicted.

In 1978, Truong was tried with co-conspirator Humphrey. Charged with six counts, including conspiracy, espionage, theft of classified information and failing to register as agents of a foreign government. Humphrey's defense was that he was trying to purchase the release of his common-law wife and her four children from Vietnam. Truong and Humphrey were convicted of spying for Vietnam and both were given a 15-year prison sentence. It is the only case of military espionage to come out of the Vietnam War. The case involved passing on documents through the wife of a naval attache, Yung Krall, codenamed "Agent Keyseat".
