= Yung Krall =

American former spy born in Vietnam

- Born: Đặng Mỹ Dung; 1946 (age 79–80); Vietnam
- Died: 23 March, 2023; Atlanta, George, U.S.
- Spouse: John Krall
- Children: Lance Krall
- Parents: Đặng Quang Minh (father); Trần Thị Phàm (mother)
- Espionage activity
- Country: South Vietnam; United States
- Allegiance: United States
- Agency: FBI; CIA; NSA

Yung Krall (Vietnamese: Đặng Mỹ Dung; 1946– March 23, 2023) is an American former spy born in Vietnam. Her autobiography, A Thousand Tears Falling, recounts her life growing up in the midst of the Vietnam War, as well as her life in America as a spy for the CIA, FBI, and NSA.

She is the mother of actor and comedian Lance Krall.

== Biography ==
Yung Krall was born Đặng Mỹ Dung in 1946 near Cần Thơ in Southern Vietnam during the French Indochina era, and lived there during the First Indochina War. She was nine years old at the signing of the Geneva Conference, which divided Vietnam into North and South Vietnam. Yung's mother chose to remain in South Vietnam to raise her children while her husband, Đặng Quang Minh joined the Communist cause in the North with the NLF, eventually becoming NLF's ambassador to the U.S.S.R. Krall's father remained in the North for the greater part of her upbringing.

Krall gained employment working for American vendors on a U.S. Navy base near Saigon where she met Lt. John Krall, a U.S. Navy pilot, whom she later married. The two of them moved to the United States.

Following the fall of Saigon, using her background as a native Vietnamese, she worked with the CIA and FBI to bring down a communist Vietnamese subgroup and recruit members in the U.S. and Europe. She played a role in the capture and conviction of North Vietnamese spies Ronald Humphrey and David Truong.
