= Việt Dzũng =

- Born: Nguyễn Ngọc Hùng Dũng; September 8, 1958; Saigon, South Vietnam
- Died: December 20, 2013 (aged 55) Fountain Valley, California, United States
- Genres: Nhạc hải ngoại
- Works: "Một chút quà cho quê hương", "Lời kinh đêm"
- Label: Asia Entertainment

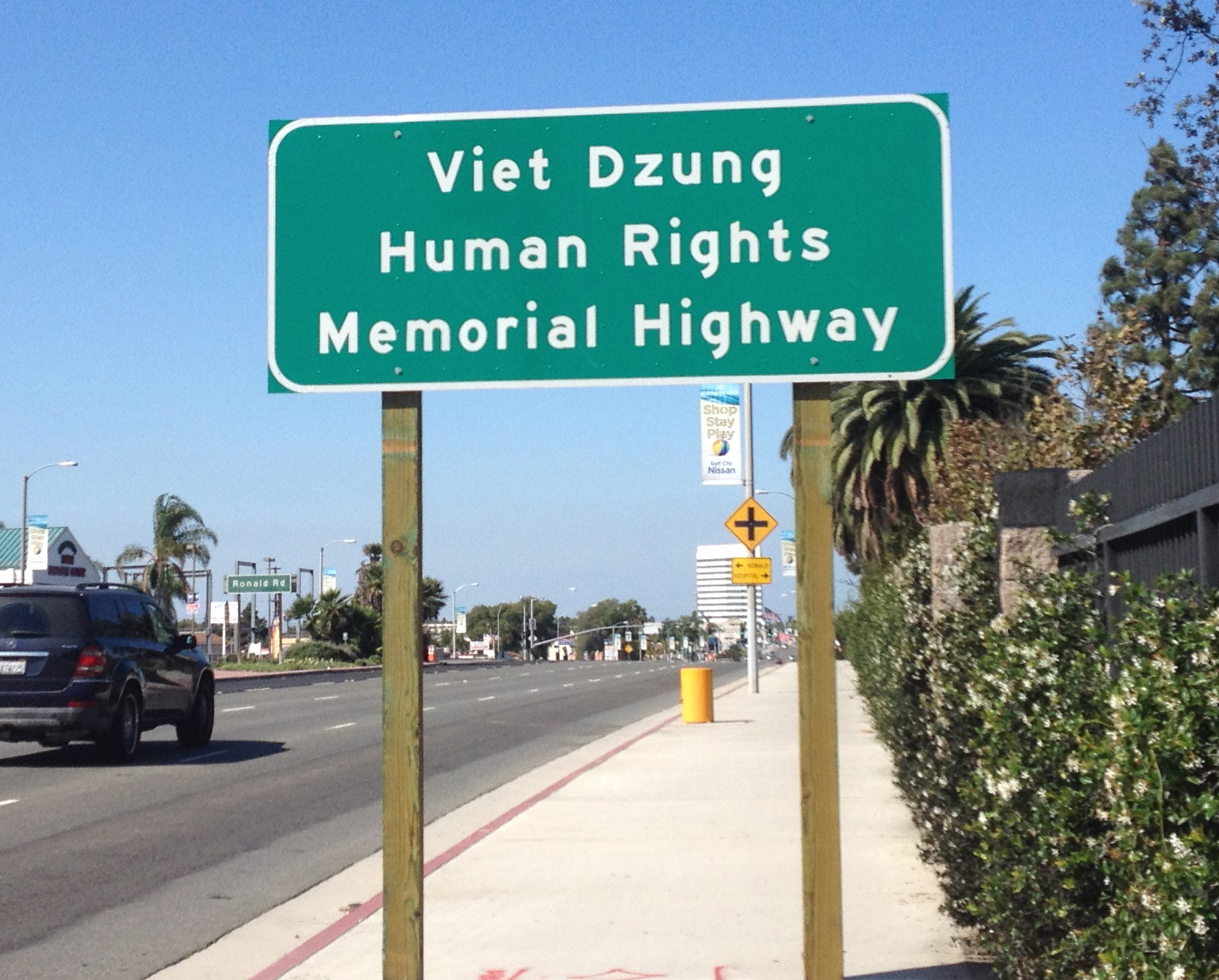
The segment of Beach Boulevard near Little Saigon, California, has been named the "Viet Dzung Human Rights Memorial Highway"

Việt Dzũng (September 8, 1958 – December 20, 2013) was a Vietnamese-American television host, musician, singer, and songwriter who was a prominent figure in the Vietnamese diaspora music scene (nhạc Việt Nam hải ngoại) in the United States. He was particularly recognized for his significant contributions to the cultural and political discourse within the overseas Vietnamese community.

== Early life and career ==
His birth name was Joachim Nguyễn Ngọc Hùng Dũng, born on September 8, 1958, in Saigon. His father was Nguyễn Ngọc Bảy, a native of Nghệ An, a former deputy in the Lower House during the Second Republic of Vietnam, and a Major and Chief Medical Officer for the General Staff and the 5th Division of the Army of the Republic of Vietnam. His mother was a former teacher at the Gia Long Girls' High School. He had one older brother, one older sister, and one younger brother. Despite being afflicted with polio from a young age and having to use crutches to move, he remained an excellent student at Lasan Taberd High School.

During the period from 1971 until before the events of April 30, 1975, he participated in many youth music festivals alongside Trường Kỳ, Tùng Giang, Nam Lộc, and others. In 1975, he became a boat person, seeking refuge in Singapore, then in the Subic refugee camp in the Philippines, before eventually resettling in the United States, where his family joined him in 1976. In his first years in the US, he composed music and won the Iowa Grand Ole Opry award. In 1985, he released the English band Children of the Ocean in collaboration with several American musicians.

Regarding Vietnamese popular music overseas, he composed a number of songs well-known within the overseas Vietnamese community, such as "Một chút quà cho quê hương" (A Small Gift for the Homeland), "Lời kinh đêm" (Night Prayer), and "Tình ca cho Nguyễn Thị Sài Gòn" (Love Song for Nguyễn Thị Sài Gòn). His album was titled Một bông hồng cho người ngã ngựa (A Rose for the Fallen). He became sworn brothers with singer-songwriter Nguyệt Ánh, Nguyễn Hữu Nghĩa, and toured extensively across the US, Australia, Japan, and Europe, pioneering the *Hưng ca* (Resurgence Song) Movement overseas, officially established on April 14, 1985, in Houston, Texas. Due to his active participation in the anti-Communist movement, Việt Dzũng and Nguyệt Ánh were sentenced to death *in absentia* by the Vietnamese government. Việt Dzũng, with his song "Một chút quà cho quê hương," along with Nam Lộc (author of "Sài Gòn vĩnh biệt"), is recognized as one of the key figures in Vietnamese overseas music.

Besides his compositions focused on the sorrows of displacement and anti-Communism, he also wrote lighthearted love songs like "Tình như cây cà rem" (Love is like an ice cream cone), "Có những cuộc tình không là trăm năm" (Some loves don't last a hundred years), "Người yêu tôi" (My Lover, set to poetry by Cung Vũ), and somber ones like "Bên đời hiu quạnh" (Beside a Lonely Life). In total, he composed over 450 songs, some of which were released in two music collections, Kinh Tỵ nạn (Refugee Sutra) and Lưu vong khúc (Exile Song). In 1990, he established his own tape and music disc production company named Việt Productions Center.

In addition to his musical activities, Việt Dzũng was also involved in literature, serving as the editor-in-chief of the monthly magazine Nhân chứng (Witness) in California. Later, he began contributing to Little Saigon Radio starting in 1993, working as a reporter and announcer for the first full-time Vietnamese radio station in Southern California. In 1997, he founded his own radio station, Radio Bolsa.

For filmed programs, he first appeared on Asia Video 9 Tình ca chọn lọc 75-95 (1995) as a singer. Subsequently, he appeared as a master of ceremonies in the grand music shows of Asia Entertainment (Trung tâm Asia), starting with video Asia 14 Yêu (1996) until Asia 73 Mùa hè rực rỡ 2013 (Radiant Summer 2013), which was his final appearance before his passing.

He frequently appeared in campaigns opposing Communism, actively supporting democratic and human rights struggles for Vietnam, participating in youth organizations in Southern California such as Thanh Sinh Phó Đức Chính and Thanh Niên Cờ Vàng (Yellow Flag Youth), advocating for human rights in Vietnam, and he consistently campaigned to assist Vietnamese boat people refugees. In 2010, he was presented with the "Community Heroes" award by California State Senator Lou Correa for 20 years of active contribution to the overseas Vietnamese community.

== Death ==
Việt Dzũng suddenly died at Fountain Valley Regional Hospital in Fountain Valley, California, United States, due to a heart condition at 10:35 a.m. on December 20, 2013, at the age of 55.

In honor of Việt Dzũng's contributions, California State Senator Lou Correa championed a resolution to name a section of Beach Boulevard near the corner of Talbert the "Việt Dzũng Human Rights Memorial Highway", which was inaugurated on August 15, 2014, within the Little Saigon area.
