= James Rosen (journalist) =

American journalist

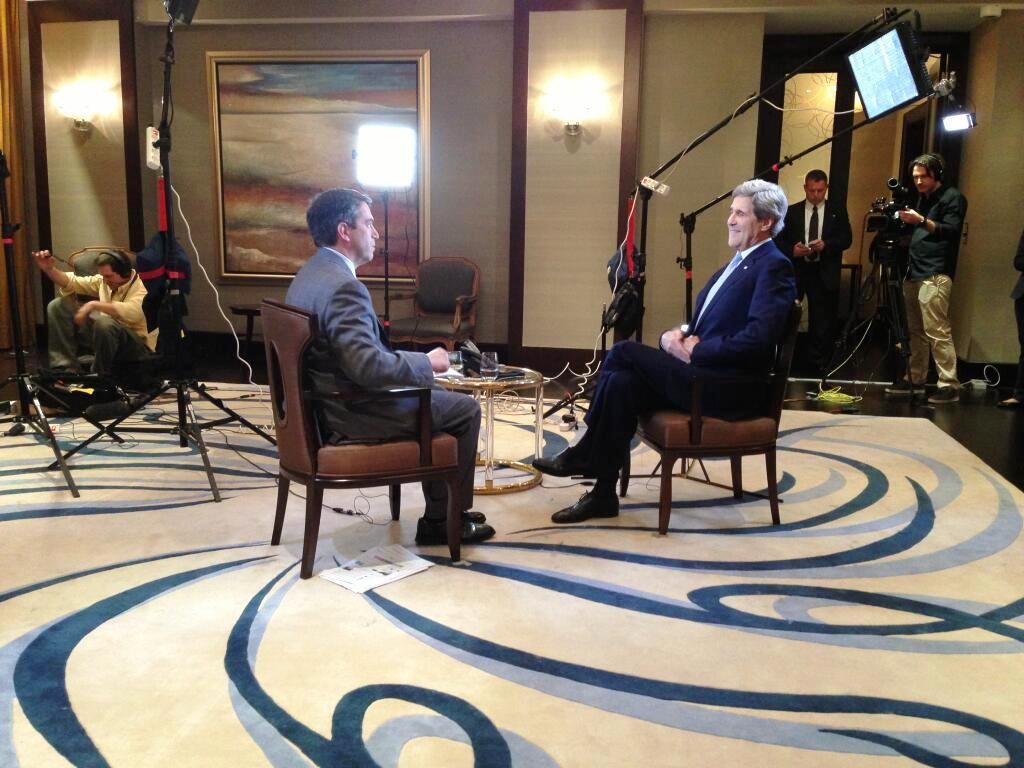
- Rosen and John Kerry in 2013
- Born: James Samuel Rosen; September 2, 1968 (age 58); New York City, US
- Education: Johns Hopkins University (BA); Northwestern University (MA)
- Occupations: Journalist, television correspondent
- Spouse: Sara Ann Durkin
- Children: 2

James Samuel Rosen (born September 2, 1968) is an American journalist, television correspondent, and author, who is a former Washington, D.C. correspondent for the Fox News Channel.

In 2013, he gained widespread public attention after Department of Justice labeled Rosen a possible criminal "co-conspirator" after being given classified information by State Department contractor Stephen Jin-Woo Kim. This led to the Justice Department surveilling Rosen via tracing his phone, the timing of his calls, and monitoring his personal emails. In response, fellow journalists and news outlets criticized the Department of Justice conduct and defended Rosen.

At the end of 2017, Rosen left Fox News after multiple accusations of sexual harassment from his female colleagues. He worked at Sinclair Broadcast Group through December 31, 2021 and then joined Newsmax as its chief White House correspondent.

== Early life and education ==
Rosen was born in 1968 in Brooklyn, New York, to Myron and Regina Rosen. His parents moved when he was young to the neighboring borough of Staten Island, and he went to public schools there. He graduated from Johns Hopkins University with a Bachelor of Arts degree in political science. He then attended the Medill School of Journalism at Northwestern University, graduating with a master's degree in journalism.

== Career ==
Rosen's first job after graduating from journalism school was as a producer for the New York television channel NY1. His on-air career began when he was hired by Roberto Soto at News 12–The Bronx. Initially Rosen was a one-man-band street reporter at News 12-The Bronx and was eventually promoted to anchorman. He also served as camera operator, editor and producer for that network. He also worked at CBS News as a researcher for lead anchor Dan Rather. Rosen worked for WREX-TV, the local NBC affiliate in Rockford, Illinois.

Rosen joined Fox News as an on-air correspondent in February 1999. According to his Fox News biography, he reported "from 49 states and more than three dozen foreign countries across five continents."

In January 2003, Rosen was named the "Funniest Celebrity in Washington" at the annual "Funniest Celebrity in Washington Contest" charity event, after performing a comedy routine that included imitations of George W. Bush, Donald Rumsfeld, Helen Thomas and Tom Brokaw, among others.

Rosen left Fox News at the end of 2017 in the context of multiple claims that he sexually harassed coworkers. Interviews with eight of his former colleagues revealed allegations of multiple instances in which Rosen made "overt physical and sexual overtures." Rosen declined to comment on these allegations when they were reported by NPR.

Reporting for Sinclair Broadcast Group on December 5, 2019, Rosen irked Speaker of the House Nancy Pelosi when he asked her if she "hates President Trump" as she was leaving a press conference regarding the impeachment inquiry against Donald Trump. Pelosi replied to Rosen, “I don’t hate anybody.” She then returned to the lectern and stated: “As a Catholic, I resent your using the word hate in a sentence that addresses me. I don’t hate anyone. So don’t mess with me when it comes to words like that.”

In June 2022, as a Newsmax reporter covering a White House briefing where actor Matthew McConaughey made an impassioned plea for gun control following the Robb Elementary School shooting in McConaughey's home town of Uvalde, Texas, Rosen asked McConaughey if he was "grandstanding."

In July 2024, as a Newsmax White House correspondent Rosen shouted out a question about then-President Joe Biden’s cognitive health to White House press secretary Karine Jean-Pierre. "Is he disabled? Is the president disabled?" Rosen asked. Reportedly, Jean-Pierre snapped back at Rosen for shouting out the question. Rosen later recounted on Newsmax, Greg Kelly Reports about being "blackballed" from asking questions at the White House in 2022 after questioning then-President Biden about his cognitive fitness.

== Books ==
In 2008 Rosen's book, The Strong Man: John Mitchell and the Secrets of Watergate was published by Doubleday; it was a biography of Richard Nixon's attorney general, John N. Mitchell and his involvement in the Watergate scandal. Rosen had spent 17 years researching and writing The Strong Man; the project was initially based on a grant Rosen had received from William F. Buckley Jr. to write the book shortly after graduating from journalism school. In 2015, Rosen published Cheney One on One: A Candid Conversation with America's Most Controversial Statesman, based on a series of interviews with former Vice President Dick Cheney.

Rosen edited A Torch Kept Lit: Great Lives of the Twentieth Century published in 2016 from the writings of William Buckley. The book includes Rosen's introduction and prefaces for each of 52 eulogies or obituaries that follow. His son Christopher Buckley has suggested that the volume, published eight years after Buckley's death, might be the greatest of his father's 60-some books.

In 2023 Rosen's book, Scalia: Rise to Greatness, 1936 to 1986 was published by Regnery Publishing. This is the first of two volumes of the biography of supreme court judge Antonin Scalia. The second volume, Scalia: The Supreme Court Years, 1986-2001 was published in 2026.

== Justice Department investigation ==
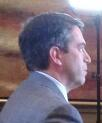
James Rosen in Doha, Qatar on March 5, 2013

On May 17, 2013, The Washington Post reported the United States Department of Justice investigated Rosen's activities by tracking his visits to the State Department, through phone traces, timing of calls and his personal emails.

In 2013, the Department of Justice of the Obama administration, under the personal direction of Attorney General Eric Holder, issued a secret search warrant targeting Rosen's emails and other records or information relevant to a government leak from Stephen Jin-Woo Kim that led to a story by Rosen about North Korea. In their analysis of this incident, the ACLU concluded: "The fundamental issue is that the government has lost a sense of proportion in enforcing our national security laws, and that should be of enormous concern to us all."

To obtain the warrants, the Justice Department said he was "accused in a Justice Department affidavit of being a possible criminal 'co-conspirator'" with Stephen Jin-Woo Kim. Fox News executive Michael Clemente said: "We are outraged to learn today that James Rosen was named a criminal co-conspirator for simply doing his job as a reporter." Eric Holder personally signed off on the search warrant of Rosen, who was labeled a "flight risk" to keep from being informed of the ongoing surveillance. The Justice Department's methods have caused various analysts and others to express concerns that "aggressive investigation of classified leaks by government officials are having a chilling effect on news organizations' ability to play a watchdog role" according to USA Today. Fox News contributor former judge Andrew Napolitano commented: "This is the first time that the federal government has moved to this level of taking ordinary, reasonable, traditional, lawful reporter skills and claiming they constitute criminal behavior."

== Personal life ==
In 2004, he married Sara Ann Durkin. Rosen lives in Washington, D.C., with his wife and two sons.
