= Trương Đình Dzu =

South Vietnamese lawyer and politician (1917–1991)

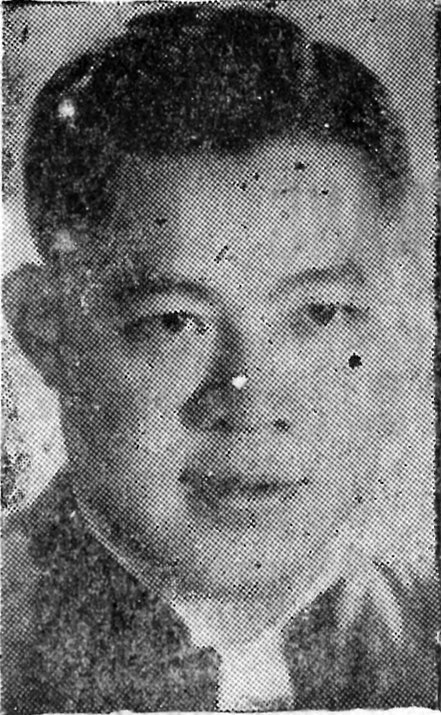
- Dzu at a press conference in Saigon, 1967
- Born: 10 November 1917; Qui Nhơn, Bình Định province, Annam, French Indochina
- Died: c. mid-1980s or c. 1991; Ho Chi Minh City, Vietnam
- Children: David Truong (son)

Trương Đình Dzu (born Trường Đình Dũ, 10 November 1917 – c. mid-1980s/1991) was a South Vietnamese lawyer and politician who unsuccessfully ran as a candidate for the presidency in the 1967 elections against Nguyễn Văn Thiệu and his running mate Nguyễn Cao Kỳ, who were the leaders of the incumbent military junta. Dzu finished second in the election and won 17% of the vote on a platform of negotiating with the National Liberation Front for South Vietnam. Politicians advocating coexistence with the communists were not allowed to register; Dzu remained silent on his policies until his candidacy was registered.

Dzu and other opposition candidates alleged electoral fraud after the poll, but he was arrested after the election on grounds of making illicit currency transactions and jailed by a military court for five years of hard labor. Due to international criticism, he was released after five months.

== Before politics ==
Dzu was born on 10 November 1917 in Qui Nhơn, Bình Định Province, in the central Vietnam. He was educated in Hanoi, and after graduating with a law degree, moved to the Mekong Delta's largest city Cần Thơ to practice in 1944, before relocating to Saigon in 1945. One of Dzu's law partners was good friend Nguyễn Hữu Thọ, who later left Saigon and went into the countryside to become the nominal political leader of the National Liberation Front, as the Vietcong called itself. That friendship later prompted voters to think that Dzu's promises of negotiated peace between the government of South Vietnam and the communists was viable.

Dzu also worked in law with Trần Văn Khiêm, the younger brother of Madame Nhu, the First Lady and sister-in-law of bachelor President Ngô Đình Diệm. This benefited Dzu and Tho as the Ngos ran kangaroo courts that were their rubber stamps and Dzu's connections gave him an advantage and the ability to influence judges and law-enforcement agencies. During the Diệm era, Dzu visited the United States and joined the Rotary Club and rose to be the organisation's director for Southeast Asia, and was known for wearing his Rotary Club tie. Dzu had also earned negative attention when he once put up his wife as collateral for a loan.

== 1961 aborted election bid ==
Dzu had declared his intention to stand as a candidate for the 1961 South Vietnamese presidential election against President Diem, but he was intimidated into withdrawing after being accused of having engaged in illegal fund transfers out of the country.

== 1967 election bid ==
In early-1967, several Americans who were detained on currency-violation charges accused Dzu of offering to have them released if they gave him a commission of US$10,000 to bribe the judges. Dzu was put under investigation, but the probe was dropped to allow him to participate in the 1967 presidential election campaign. Under contemporary laws, political activity that promoted negotiations with the Vietcong was forbidden. There had been previous instances where politicians that had advocated a ceasefire were disqualified from running.

As a little-known politician, Dzu remained silent until his candidacy was approved before exhibiting his policies. Afterwards, he campaigned with the dove as his emblem, urging negotiations. Dzu gained a reputation for being the most dynamic and eloquent of the 11 presidential candidates. He repeatedly assailed Thiệu and his deputy Kỳ in strident language, accusing them of using "dirty tricks" to hinder his campaign.

Dzu claimed that he had been meeting with Buddhist activist Thích Trí Quang and the Vietcong had called on communist sympathizers to vote for him, but later denied these. While others also advocated peace deals, Dzu was the most vigorous in disseminating his message, making competitors such as Phan Khắc Sửu and Trần Văn Hương, who had briefly served as president and prime minister respectively under the junta's supervision in 1964–65, appear lethargic.

With 17% of the vote, Dzu came second behind the ticket of General Nguyễn Văn Thiệu, hitherto the figurehead chief of state, and Air Marshal-cum-Prime Minister Nguyễn Cao Kỳ. His success caught observers by surprise. Two weeks before the poll, a study by US Embassy officials privately estimated that he would only get around 4% of the vote and come fifth on the popular vote. Of South Vietnam's 44 provinces, he came first in 5, all of which were under control of Vietcong guerrillas, and placed second in 26 behind the Thiệu–Kỳ ticket. Dzu rebutted accusations of communist coercion by pointing out that by such logic, the communists had supported Thiệu and were therefore aligned with him.

In the accompanying senate election, voters had to choose six out of the 48 candidate groupings, and the six most popular tickets of ten nominees would be elected to the 60-member upper house. Dzu endorsed five tickets, but none were successful. Along with two other failed presidential candidates, Sửu and Hoàng Cơ Bình, Dzu held a media conference accusing Thiệu and Kỳ of electoral fraud. Kỳ had not hidden his distaste for democracy or his opponents during the campaign and had described the civilian candidates as "'ordure' [dirt, filth, excrement], 'traitors', and 'destroyers of national interest'". Kỳ went on to say that if his opponents continued to attack him, he would cancel the poll.

Dzu and seven other civilian tickets filed formal complaints against the military for campaign irregularities. American officials, in line with their support for Thiệu and Kỳ, dismissed the protests as "sour grapes", but a committee from the Constituent Assembly later resolved 16–2 to void the election results due to "a pattern of fraud". The finding had no effect as Thiệu and Kỳ made a series of arrests and other crackdowns against civilian dissent.

After the election, Dzu claimed to be the Leader of the Opposition to Thiệu and Kỳ. His performance was regarded as a sign of the public discontent with military influence on politics rather than an endorsement of his policies. Nevertheless, Thiệu was embarrassed by the results and had him arrested for illicit currency transactions. Dzu was accused of illegally opening a bank account in San Francisco and was put under police surveillance.

Dzu was arrested and brought before a Special Military Court on 26 July 1968 and sentenced to five years of hard labour, but due to public pressure in South Vietnam and abroad, he was released after only five months.

== Later life ==
There are various accounts of his life after the fall of Saigon in April 1975. Some sources said that he was accused of contacts with American officials and the Central Intelligence Agency and was sent to a re-education camp by the new communist government, eventually dying in the mid-1980s. Other sources said he was invited by the new government to serve as a senior adviser in Hanoi, where he lived in Từ Liêm district and later died in Ho Chi Minh City c. 1991.

== Personal life ==
Dzu was a member of the Rotary Club and was once its director for Southeast Asia. He was known for wearing his Rotary Club tie.

Dzu's son, David Truong, who was living in the United States since the mid-1960s, was in 1978 convicted of espionage for the Vietnamese government.
