= Stephen Jin-Woo Kim =

American whistleblower

Stephen Jin-Woo Kim is an American former U.S. State Department contractor who pleaded guilty to a felony count of disclosing classified information to Fox News reporter James Rosen. Prosecutors charged that Kim's actions indirectly alerted North Korea to what U.S. intelligence officials "knew or did not know about its military capabilities and preparedness".

== Early life ==
He was born on August 15, 1967, in Seoul, South Korea. His family moved to New York in 1976. He attended Fordham Preparatory School, a Jesuit school. For college he went to the Georgetown University School of Foreign Service (1989). He tried out Wall Street but found the work did not suit him. Following that, he attended Harvard for a master's degree in national security (1992), and then Yale for a Ph.D. in diplomatic and military history (1999). He authored a book based on his dissertation. He has also extensively studied philosophy and literature.

== Employment ==
After graduation, he went to work at the Center for Naval Analyses, where he analyzed US operations in Kosovo, Afghanistan, and Iraq. After the September 11 attacks, he moved to the Lawrence Livermore National Laboratory where he focused on North Korea. He briefed the Defense Policy Board on his work as well as Henry Kissinger, Stephen Hadley, and Dick Cheney. He also worked at the Office of Net Assessment under the secretary of defense, analyzing Chinese nuclear issues.

In 2008, he went to work as a contractor at the State Department at the Bureau of Arms Control, Verification and Compliance. There, he was Senior Advisor for Intelligence to the Assistant Secretary of State for Verification, Compliance, and Implementation. He studied North Korea's nuclear program, especially its claims of dismantling its equipment. He also participated in nuclear war games at the Naval War College.

=== Incident with Rosen ===
In June 2009, Kim allegedly had a conversation with Rosen about North Korea planning a nuclear bomb test.

== Indictment ==
In August 2010, Kim was indicted by a grand jury on two charges:

- Unauthorized disclosure of national defense information in violation of 18 U.S.C. § 793(d) (the Espionage Act)
- Making false statements in violation of 18 U.S.C. § 1001(a)(2)

The government alleges that Kim's conversation with Rosen contained information related to the "national defense" (793(d) does not use the word "classified"). The alleged false statements to the FBI occurred in September 2009, regarding whether or not Kim had any contact with Rosen (whom he allegedly met around March 2009).

Kim initially pleaded not guilty. Rosen and Fox were not named in the indictment (which listed them as a "reporter" and a "news organization"), but news reports identified the parties.

Kim was defended by prominent attorneys Abbe Lowell of Chadbourne & Parke and Paul M. Thompson and James M. Commons of McDermott Will & Emery. One of Lowell's arguments was that Bob Woodward's book Obama's Wars contains far more sensitive information than the information Kim is accused of leaking, which created a double standard in leak prosecution. Lowell also said that the DOJ is "stretch[ing] the espionage laws" and having a chilling effect on government officials communicating with the press. He also said that Kim would never do anything "for which he had any reason to believe would harm [US interests]".

== Guilty plea ==
On February 7, 2014, Kim entered a guilty plea to a single felony count of disclosing classified national defense information to an unauthorized person, Rosen. His lawyer, Lowell, admitted that his client "made a decision to cross a line" and that he "should have known better". Assistant U.S. Attorney Michael Harvey added that Kim "was motivated not by an altruistic purpose but by his own ego and desire for professional advancement". Before sentencing, US District Judge Colleen Kollar-Kotelly said Kim "did lose his moral compass". Kim was sentenced to a 13-month prison term.

== See also ==
- Thomas Andrews Drake (NSA whistleblower charged under the Espionage Act, 2010)
- Jeffrey Alexander Sterling (ex-CIA convicted under Espionage Act for revealing classified information to a reporter, 2010)
