= Pierre Nguyễn Soạn =

Vietnamese Catholic bishop (1936–2024)

His Excellency Pierre Nguyễn Soạn
- Bishop Emeritus of Qui Nhơn
- Metropolis: Huế
- Diocese: Qui Nhơn
- Appointed: 3 June 1999
- Term ended: 30 June 2012
- Predecessor: Paul Huỳnh Ðông Các
- Successor: Matthieu Nguyễn Văn Khôi

Orders
- Ordination: 21 December 1968
- Consecration: 12 August 1999 by Étienne Nguyễn Như Thể

Personal details
- Born: 15 December 1936 Goi Thi, Annam, French Indochina
- Died: 8 July 2024 (aged 87) Quy Nhon, Vietnam
- Motto: Scis quia amo Te

Pierre Nguyễn Soạn (15 December 1936 – 8 July 2024) was a Vietnamese Catholic bishop who served as the Bishop of Quy Nhơn from 1999 to 2012. He held the title of Bishop Emeritus of Quy Nhơn from 2012 until his death.

== Biography ==
Pierre Nguyễn Soạn was born on 15 December 1936, in Phước Sơn, a commune in Tuy Phước District, Binh Dinh Province. He studied philosophy and theology at the Làng Sông Minor Seminary in Quy Nhơn, the minor seminary in Nha Trang, and finally at the Pontifical Academy of Saint Pius X in Da Lat. He also attended the University of Saigon, where he obtained a degree in English literature in 1971.

He was ordained a priest on 21 December 1968, and he served in various capacities within the Diocese of Quy Nhơn. After his priestly ordination, he went to Rome to study at the Pontifical Urban University, where he earned a doctorate in canon law in 1974. Upon his return to Vietnam, he served as parish priest and seminary director during the Vietnam War and its aftermath. In 1989, he was appointed vicar general and cathedral parish priest.

On 3 June 1999, Pope John Paul II appointed him Bishop of Quy Nhơn, and he was consecrated bishop on 12 August of the same year by Archbishop Étienne Nguyễn Như Thể.

He served as Secretary General of the Vietnam Bishops' Conference from 2001 to 2007. He participated in the X Ordinary General Assembly of the Synod of Bishops in October 2001 and was elected a member of the post-synodal electoral committee.

Pierre Nguyễn retired on 30 June 2012, upon reaching the age limit. He died in Quy Nhon on 8 July 2024, at the age of 87.

== Episcopal lineage ==
The episcopal lineage:

- Patriarch Eliya XII (XI) Denha
- Patriarch Yohannan VIII Hormizd
- Bishop Yohannan Gabriel
- Archbishop Joseph V Augustine Hindi
- Patriarch Joseph VI Audo
- Patriarch Eliya XIV Abulyonan
- Patriarch Yousef VI Emmanuel II Thomas
- Bishop François David
- Archbishop Antonin-Fernand Drapier, O.P.
- Archbishop Pierre Martin Ngô Đình Thục
- Archbishop Philippe Nguyễn Kim Điền, P.F.I.
- Archbishop Étienne Nguyễn Như Thể
- Bishop Pierre Nguyễn Soạn

Catholic Church titles
Preceded by Paul Huỳnh Ðông Các	Bishop of Qui Nhơn; 1999–2012	Succeeded by Matthieu Nguyễn Văn Khôi
