= Vincent Nguyễn Văn Bản =

Vietnamese Catholic prelate (born 1956)

His Excellency, The Most Reverend Vincent Nguyễn Văn Bản
- Bishop of Hải Phòng
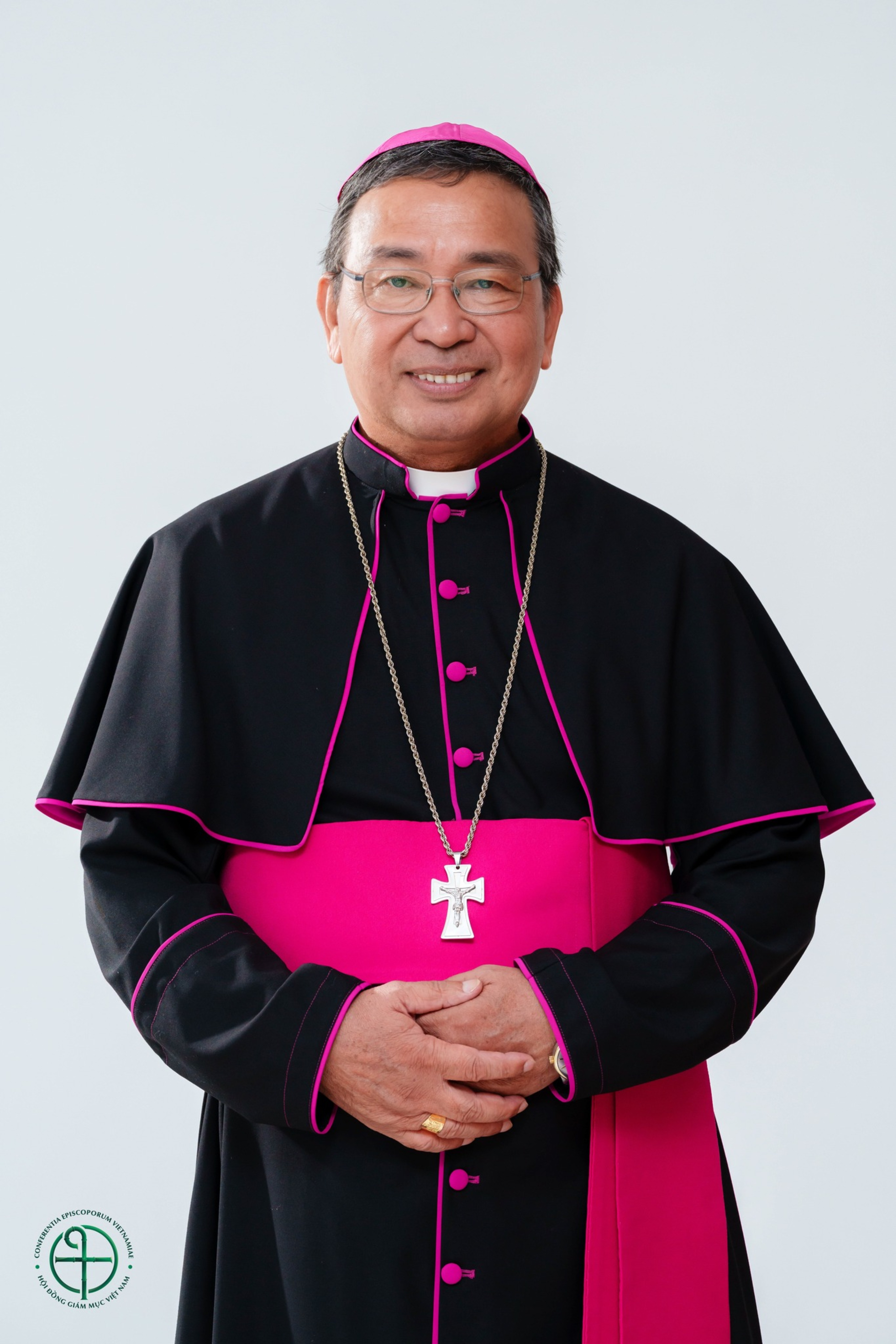
- Official portrait, 2024
- Native name: Vinh Sơn Nguyễn Văn Bản
- Province: Hà Nội
- Diocese: Hải Phòng
- Appointed: 19 March 2022
- Installed: 31 March 2022
- Predecessor: Joseph Vũ Văn Thiên
- Previous posts: Bishop of Ban Mê Thuột (2009–2022); Apostolic Administrator of Ban Mê Thuột (2022–2024)

Orders
- Ordination: 15 September 1993 by Paul Huỳnh Đông Các
- Consecration: 12 May 2009 by Étienne Nguyễn Như Thể

Personal details
- Born: 25 November 1956 (age 69) Tuy Hòa, Phú Yên, Republic of Việt Nam
- Denomination: Catholic Church
- Education: Institut Catholique de Paris
- Motto: Spiritu ambulate; (Walk in the Spirit); (Hãy bước theo Thần Khí)
- Styles
- Reference style: His Excellency; The Most Reverend
- Spoken style: Your Excellency
- Religious style: Bishop

Vincent Nguyễn Văn Bản (born 25 November 1956) is a Vietnamese Catholic prelate serving as the fourth Bishop of Hải Phòng since 2022. He previously served as the fourth Bishop of Ban Mê Thuột from 2009 to 2022.

== Biography ==
=== Early life and education ===
Nguyễn Văn Bản was born on 25 November 1956, in Tuy Hoa in Phu Yen Province, the seventh of nine children in a devout Catholic family originally from Hai Duong Province who fled south at the end of the First Indochina War. In 1968, he began his religious studies at the minor seminary of Làng Sông in Qui Nhơn. In 1975, he entered the major seminary of the Diocesan Training Center of the Diocese of Qui Nhơn, where he studied philosophy and theology until 1988. After completing his studies, he provided pastoral service at his home parish in Tuy Hoa.

=== Priesthood ===
He was ordained a priest on 15 September 1993 by bishop Paul Huỳnh Đông Các for the Diocese of Qui Nhơn. After his ordination, he served as vicar of Tuy Hoa parish until 1996, when he was sent to France to study at the Institut Catholique de Paris, where he obtained a master's degree in theology in 2005. Upon returning to Vietnam, he was appointed head of seminarian formation for the diocese and professor at the major seminary of Nha Trang. He was also appointed an expert during the XII Ordinary General Assembly of the Synod of Bishops held in October 2008.

=== Episcopate ===
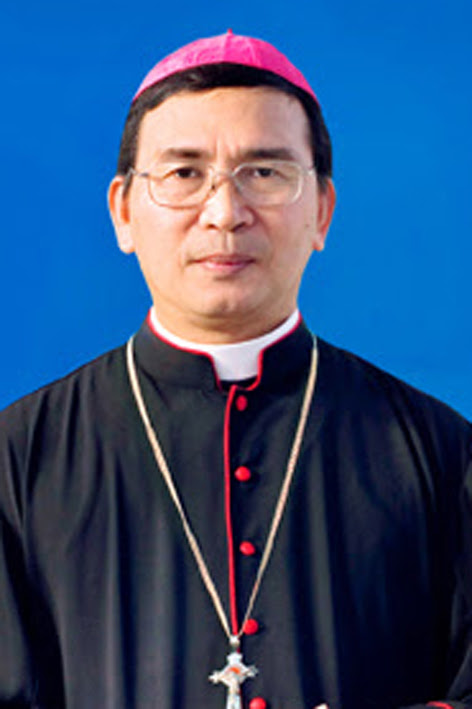
Bishop Bản as Bishop of Ban Mê Thuột in 2009.

On 21 February 2009, Pope Benedict XVI appointed him bishop of Ban Mê Thuột. He received episcopal consecration on 12 May 2009, from archbishop Étienne Nguyễn Như Thể. Within the Vietnamese Episcopal Conference, he served as chairman of the committee for sacred music for three consecutive terms from 2010 to 2019. In 2019, he was elected chairman of the Biblical Commission and re-elected for a second term for 2022–2025. During his ministry in Ban Mê Thuột, he encouraged local clergy to communicate in the ethnic languages of the local populations and introduced seminary courses in three local ethnic languages: Ede (Ê Đê), Mnong (M'Nông), and Stieng (S’tiêng). Over the years, he witnessed an increase in the number of faithful, largely due to conversions, and a growth in vocations among the youth, increasing the number of new priests, religious men, and women. He contributed to the construction of 101 new churches in the region. On 19 March 2022, Pope Francis appointed him bishop of Hai Phong. He took possession of the diocese on 31 March 2022.

== Episcopal succession ==
The episcopal succession is:

- Patriarch Eliya XII Denha
- Patriarch Yohannan VIII Hormizd
- Bishop Yohannan Gabriel
- Archbishop Augustin Hindi
- Patriarch Joseph VI Audo
- Patriarch Eliya Abulyonan
- Patriarch Yousef VI Emmanuel II Thomas
- Bishop François David
- Archbishop Antonin-Fernand Drapier, O.P.
- Archbishop Pierre Martin Ngô Đình Thục
- Archbishop Philippe Nguyễn Kim Điền, P.F.I.
- Archbishop Étienne Nguyễn Như Thể
- Bishop Vincent Nguyễn Văn Bản
