= Étienne Nguyễn Như Thể =

Vietnamese Catholic prelate (1935–2024)

The Most Reverend Étienne Nguyễn Như Thể
- Archbishop of Huế
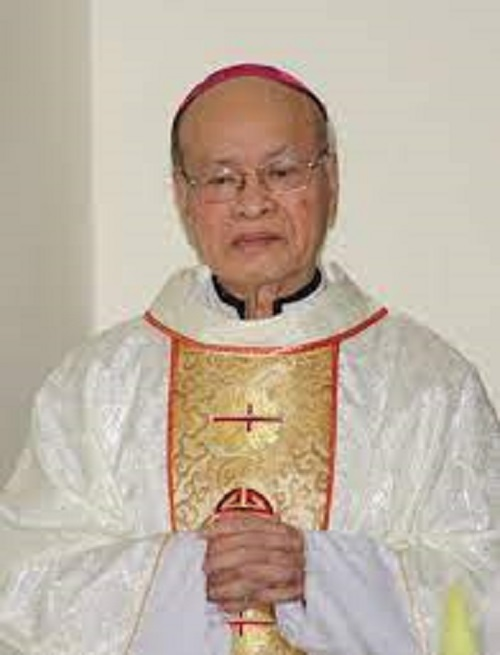
- Native name: Stêphanô Nguyễn Như Thể
- Church: Catholic
- Archdiocese: Huế
- Province: Huế
- Appointed: 1 March 1998
- Installed: 9 April 1998
- Term ended: 18 August 2012
- Predecessor: Philippe Nguyễn Kim Điền PFI
- Successor: Francis Xavier Lê Văn Hồng
- Previous posts: Apostolic Administrator of Huế (1994–1998); Titular Archbishop of Tipasa in Mauretania (1975–1998); Coadjutor Archbishop of Huế (1975–1983)

Orders
- Ordination: 6 January 1962 by Jean-Baptiste Urrutia MEP
- Consecration: 7 September 1975 by Philippe Nguyễn Kim Điền PFI

Personal details
- Born: Nguyễn Như Thể; 1 December 1935 Hải Thọ, Quang Tri Province, Annam, French Indochina
- Died: 16 December 2024 (aged 89) Huế, Vietnam
- Motto: Pro mundi vita (For the life of the world) (Để cho trần gian được sống)

Étienne Nguyễn Như Thể (1 December 1935 – 16 December 2024) was a Vietnamese Catholic prelate who served as the third Archbishop of Huế from 1998 to 2012.

== Biography ==
Nguyễn Như Thể was born on 1 December 1935 in Hải Thọ, Hải Lăng District, Quang Tri Province, Vietnam, into a deeply Catholic family with seven children, originating from Thua Thien Hue Province.

He entered the minor seminary An Ninh in Huế in 1947 and then the major seminary Saint Joseph's in Saigon in 1955.

He was ordained a priest on 6 January 1962 by Archbishop Jean-Baptiste Urrutia. After ordination, he served as a professor at the minor seminary Hoan Thiện in Huế until 1968. He then went to France to study at the Catholic Institute of Paris, where he earned a master's degree in dogmatic theology in 1970. Upon his return to Vietnam, he resumed his role as a teacher at the seminary until 1972, when he became its director.

Thể died on 16 December 2024, at the age of 89. He was interred at Thiên Thai catholic cemetery.

=== Episcopal ministry ===
Following the reunification of Vietnam under the Communist government of Hanoi, on 7 September 1975, Pope Paul VI appointed him Coadjutor Archbishop of Huế and assigned him the titular see of Tipasa in Mauretania. He was consecrated a bishop on the same day by Archbishop Philippe Nguyễn Kim Điền. He assisted Archbishop Philippe Nguyễn Kim Điền for eight years during the difficult post-war period. He resigned on 23 November 1983 for health reasons. On 23 March 1994, he was appointed Apostolic Administrator sede vacante et ad nutum Sanctae Sedis. In November of the same year, he obtained permission from the government to reopen the seminary of Huế, and in 1995, he was elected president of the Committee for the Clergy and Seminarians of the Vietnamese Bishops' Conference, re-elected for a second term in the triennium 1998–2001.

On 1 March 1998, Pope John Paul II appointed him Archbishop of Huế. He took possession of the archdiocese on 9 April of the same year. Unable to travel to Rome, he received the pallium on 14 August of the same year from Cardinal Paul Joseph Phạm Đình Tụng. He led the archdiocese for 14 years, retiring on 18 August 2012 due to age limit.

== Episcopal lineage and apostolic succession ==
The episcopal lineage is:

- Patriarch Eliya XII Denha
- Patriarch Yohannan VIII Hormizd
- Bishop Yohannan Gabriel
- Archbishop Joseph V Augustine Hindi
- Patriarch Joseph VI Audo
- Patriarch Eliya XIV Abulyonan
- Patriarch Yousef VI Emmanuel II Thomas
- Bishop François David
- Archbishop Antonin-Fernand Drapier, O.P.
- Archbishop Pierre Martin Ngô Đình Thục
- Archbishop Philippe Nguyễn Kim Điền, P.F.I.
- Archbishop Étienne Nguyễn Như Thể

The apostolic succession is:

- Bishop Pierre Nguyễn Soạn (1999)
- Archbishop Francis Xavier Lê Văn Hồng (2005)
- Bishop Vincent Nguyễn Văn Bản (2009)

Catholic Church titles
Preceded by Philippe Nguyễn Kim Điền	Archbishop of Huế; 1998–2012	Succeeded by Francis Xavier Lê Văn Hồng
Preceded by Francisco Xavier da Piedade Rebelo	Titular Archbishop of Tipasa in Mauretania; 1975–1998	Succeeded by Timothy Joseph Carroll
