= Nguyễn Văn Thuận =

Vietnamese Catholic cardinal (1928–2002)

Venerable Nguyễn Văn Thuận
- President of the Pontifical Council for Justice and Peace
- Thuận as Cardinal (2001–2002)
- Native name: Phanxicô Xaviê Nguyễn Văn Thuận
- Church: Catholic
- Appointed: 24 June 1998
- Term ended: 16 September 2002
- Predecessor: Roger Marie Élie Etchegaray
- Successor: Renato Raffaele Martino
- Other post: Cardinal-Deacon of Santa Maria della Scala (2001–2002)
- Previous posts: Titular Archbishop of Vadesi (1975–2001); Coadjutor Archbishop of Sài Gòn (1975–1994); Bishop of Nha Trang (1967–1975)

Orders
- Ordination: 11 June 1953 by Jean-Baptiste Urrutia MEP
- Consecration: 24 June 1967 by Angelo Palmas
- Created cardinal: 21 February 2001 by Pope John Paul II
- Rank: Cardinal-Deacon

Personal details
- Born: 17 April 1928 Huế, French Indochina
- Died: 16 September 2002 (aged 74) Rome, Italy
- Buried: Santa Maria della Scala, Rome, Italy
- Denomination: Catholic
- Motto: Gaudium et spes; (Joy and hope); (Vui mừng và hy vọng)
- Styles
- Reference style: His Eminence
- Spoken style: Your Eminence
- Informal style: Cardinal

Francis-Xavier Nguyễn Văn Thuận (pronounced [ŋʷjə̌ˀn van tʰwə̂ˀn]; 17 April 1928 – 16 September 2002) was a Vietnamese Catholic prelate who served as President of the Pontifical Council for Justice and Peace from 1998 to 2002. Prior to that, he served as Coadjutor Archbishop of the Archdiocese of Sài Gòn from 1975 to 1994 and as Bishop of Nha Trang from 1967 to 1975.

He was a nephew of South Vietnam's first president, Ngô Đình Diệm, and of Archbishop Ngô Đình Thục. Thuận, targeted for his faith as well as his family connections to Diệm, was detained by the communist government of Vietnam, shortly after being appointed coadjutor archbishop. He was put in a re-education camp for 13 years, nine in solitary confinement, and then put under house arrest until he was exiled to Rome in 1991. Thuận was made a cardinal in 2001 by Pope John Paul II.

Pope Francis declared him venerable on 4 May 2017.

== Early life ==
Thuận was born in Huế near the area of Phủ Cam Cathedral on 17 April 1928, the son of Nguyễn Văn Ấm and Elizabeth Ngô Đình Thị Hiệp, daughter of Ngô Đình Khả. He joined the seminary at An Ninh as a teenager, and was ordained a priest on 11 June 1953, by Monsignor Jean-Baptiste Urrutia. After three years of further studies in Rome, he was appointed in 1959–1967 as a faculty member and rector of the Seminary of Hoan Thiện, Huế.

== Episcopal career ==
He was appointed Bishop of Nha Trang on 13 April 1967 and received episcopal consecration on 4 June 1967 at Huế from Angelo Palmas, Apostolic Delegate to Viêt Nam (and later Nuncio to Colombia and to Canada), assisted by Archbishops Philippe Nguyễn Kim Điền, titular archbishop of Parium and Apostolic Administrator of Huế, and Jean-Baptiste Urrutia, titular archbishop of Carpato. On 24 April 1975, he was appointed Coadjutor Archbishop of Sài Gòn. Six days later, Sài Gòn fell to the North Vietnamese Army. Thuận, targeted for his faith as well as his family connections to Ngô Đình Diệm, was detained by the communist government of Vietnam in a re-education camp for 13 years, nine in solitary confinement.

In prison, he smuggled out messages to his people on scraps of paper. The brief reflections, copied by hand and circulated within the Vietnamese community, have been printed in the book, The Road of Hope. Through a network of influential Overseas Vietnamese, including dignitaries, like his former classmate Monsignor Trần Văn Hoài, The Road of Hope was distributed worldwide. Another book, Prayers of Hope, contains his prayers written in prison. The bishop fashioned a tiny Bible out of scraps of paper. Sympathetic guards smuggled in a piece of wood and some wire from which he crafted a small crucifix.

=== In exile ===
On 21 November 1988, Thuận was released by the communist government but kept under house arrest in the archbishop's house in Hanoi, impeded from returning to his see, Hồ Chí Minh City. He was allowed to visit Rome in 1991 but not to return. The following year, he was given a post at the International Catholic Commission for Migration in Geneva, Switzerland. On 24 November 1994, he was appointed President of the Pontifical Council for Justice and Peace, and at the same time resigned from his post of Coadjutor Archbishop of Saigon. As President of the Pontifical Council, he handled issues such as Third World debt. In 1995, he was appointed Postulator of the Cause of Beatification of Brother Nguyễn Tân Văn, also known as Marcel Van. On 21 February 2001, Thuận was created a Cardinal Deacon of Santa Maria della Scala. He died of cancer in a clinic in Rome, Italy, on 16 September 2002, at the age of 74.

== Beatification process ==
On 16 September 2007, the fifth anniversary of the cardinal's death, the Catholic Church began the beatification process for Thuận. Pope Benedict XVI expressed "profound joy" at news of the official opening of the beatification cause. Catholics in Vietnam also positively received the news on beatification process opening for the cardinal. In the words of a catechist from the Archdiocese of Hồ Chí Minh City, "Nguyễn Văn Thuận is an example of holiness for Vietnamese Catholics and for the entire world." Waldery Hilgeman is postulator of the cause.

In his 2007 encyclical, Spe Salvi, Benedict XVI referred to Thuận's Prayers of Hope, saying: "During thirteen years in jail, in a situation of seemingly utter hopelessness, the fact that he could listen and speak to God became for him an increasing power of hope, which enabled him, after his release, to become for people all over the world a witness to hope—to that great hope which does not wane even in the nights of solitude."

== Writings ==
- François-Xavier Nguyễn Văn Thuận. Five Loaves & Two Fish 1969 ISBN 978-0819826763
- François-Xavier Nguyễn Văn Thuận. The Road of Hope: A Gospel from Prison 2001 ISBN 978-0819864734
- François-Xavier Nguyễn Văn Thuận. Prayers of Hope, Words of Courage 2002 ISBN 978-0819859389
- François-Xavier Nguyễn Văn Thuận. Five Loaves & Two Fish 2003 ISBN 978-0819826763
- François-Xavier Nguyễn Văn Thuận. Prières d'espérance 1995 ISBN 978-2866791872
- François-Xavier Nguyễn Văn Thuận. J'ai suivi Jésus: un évêque témoigne 1997 ISBN 978-2712206451

=== Quotes ===
- Recorded on the Feast of the Holy Rosary, 7 October 1976, in Phú Khánh prison, during his solitary confinement: "I am happy here, in this cell, where white mushrooms are growing on my sleeping mat, because You are here with me, because You want me to live here with You. I have spoken much in my lifetime: now I speak no more. It's Your turn to speak to me, Jesus; I am listening to You".

== See also ==
- Roman Catholicism in Vietnam
- Johann Bernhard Brinkmann
