= Phủ Cam Cathedral =

- Immaculate Heart of Mary Cathedral
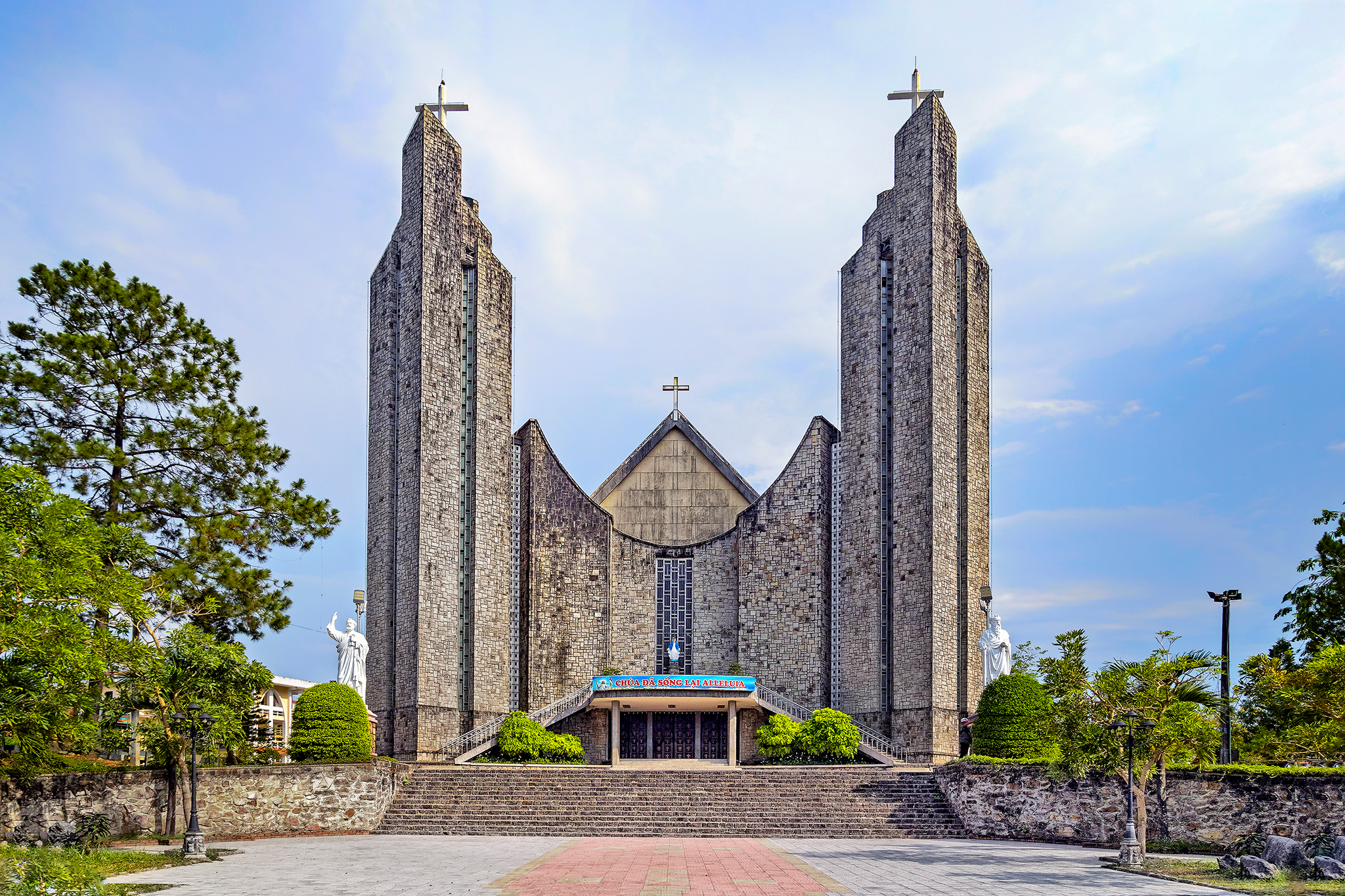
- The façade of Phủ Cam Cathedral (2019)
- Phủ Cam Cathedral
- Location: 1 Đoàn Hữu Trưng, Phước Vĩnh, Huế
- Country: Vietnam
- Denomination: Roman Catholic

History
- Status: Cathedral
- Founded: 1684
- Consecrated: 29 June 2000

Architecture
- Functional status: Active
- Architect: Ngô Viết Thụ
- Architectural type: Modern

Administration
- Archdiocese: Archdiocese of Huế

Phủ Cam Cathedral (Vietnamese: Nhà thờ Chính tòa Phủ Cam) is a Latin Catholic cathedral in Huế, Vietnam, and seat of the Archdiocese of Huế. Built in almost 40 years (1963—2000) at the site where a Catholic church has existed since the 17th century, this church is one of the largest in Huế.

== History ==
Phủ Cam Cathedral stands on a hill where an orange plantation once stood. In 1684, Father Langlois acquired land on Phước Quả Hill to the Southeast of the Imperial City to build a large stone church, which was completely dismantled in 1698. Then in 1898, Bishop Eugène Marie Allys (Bishop Lý, as people used to call him) erected a large brick structure, with tiled roof, at the same location on Phước Quả Hill. That church, designed by and then constructed under the direction of Bishop Lý, was completed in 1902.

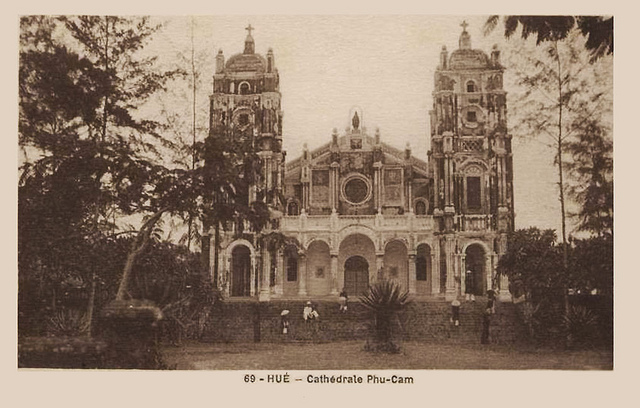
The church that Bishop Eugène Marie Allys erected

The residence of the Papal Delegation to Vietnam, which oversaw Vietnam, Thailand, Cambodia and Laos together, was built next to the former cathedral (Note: This former cathedral was demolished in the 1960s to make way for the current Phủ Cam Cathedral.) in Huế on 20 May 1925. (Note: This residence of the Papal Delegation was moved to Hanoi in 1951.)

The construction of the current church started on the property in 1963, following the design of Ngô Viết Thụ and took nearly 40 years. (Note: During this period, President Ngô Đình Diệm of South Vietnam was killed in a coup that took place in Saigon. Archbishop Ngô Đình Thục of the Archdiocese—Diệm's brother—was in Rome at the time for the Second Vatican Council and was unable to return to Vietnam because of the political situation.) It was still taking place in 1968 when the unfinished building was heavily damaged by bombing during the Tet Offensive. (Note: Over 400 people supportive of the South Vietnamese government were rounded up at the cathedral in February 1968 by the Viet Cong and then led to the creek where they were shot dead.) Construction was then delayed and ultimately abandoned after 1975, although it could be seen in the mid-1990s that the nave was practically completed.

Under the direction of Archbishop Nguyễn Như Thể, the Cathedral was completed in May 2000, with the official consecration taking place during the Feast of Saints Peter and Paul on 28 and 29 June 2000. Saints Peter and Paul are the patrons of the parish.

Archbishop Francis Xavier Lê Văn Hồng inaugurated the new rectory on 8 October 2014 in a ribbon-cutting and blessing ceremony. It was built with money collected in the area and from benefactors abroad.

== Description ==
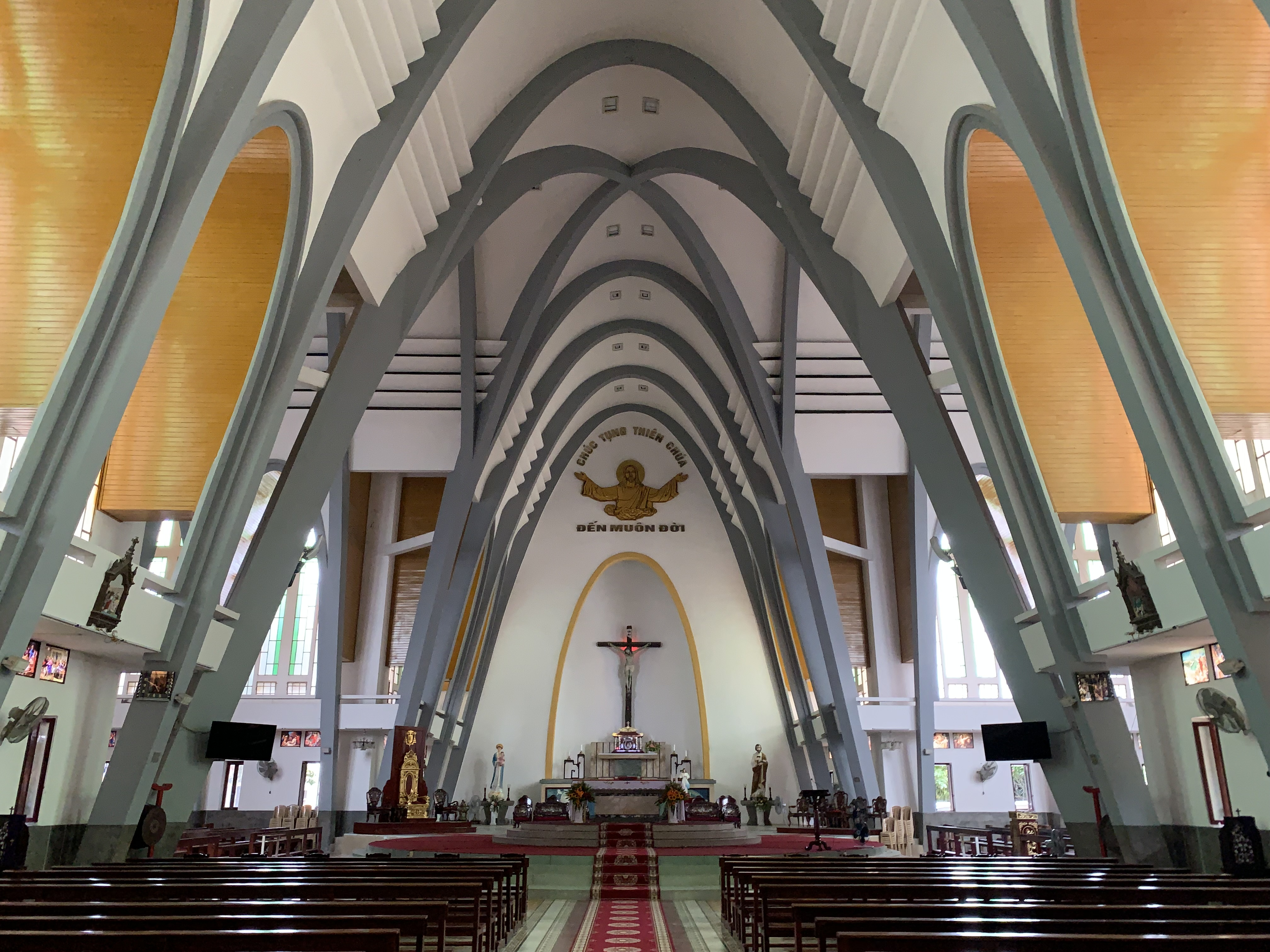
The interior of the cathedral

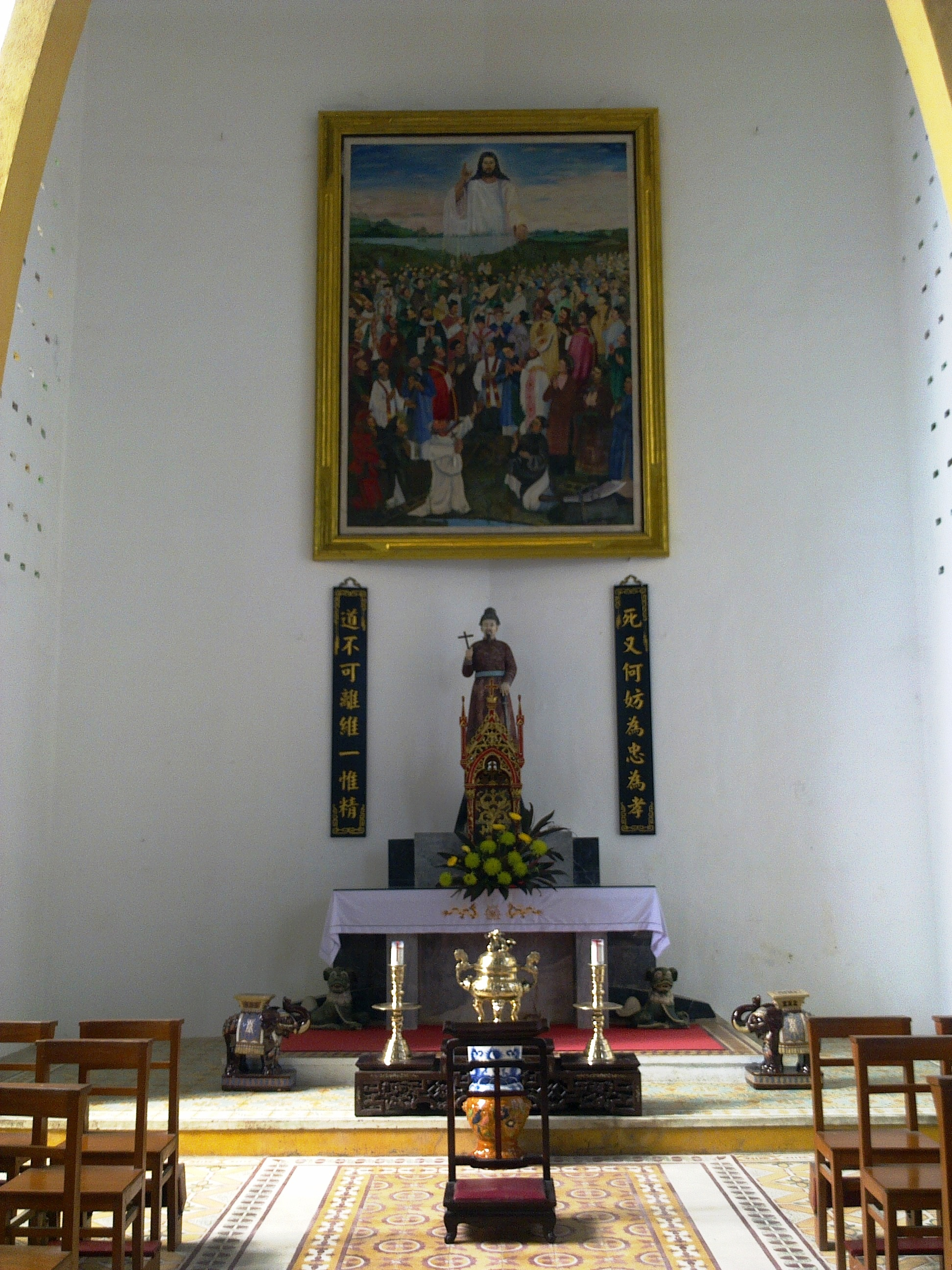
The altar dedicated to St. Paul Tống Viết Bường inside the Cathedral

Built in the modern style on a small hill at one end of Nguyễn Trường Tộ street, the current Phủ Cam Cathedral was designed by Ngô Viết Thụ. Supporting concrete pillars were built close to the walls and gradually bent. Each of the four corners has three such pillars, creating a fairly large space inside the building. The interior of the cathedral was built following classical Catholic tradition. There are two rows of coloured glass windows located in the upper interior of the cathedral. Inside, there is a cross made of steel and concrete on a round pillar. The cathedral has a marble altar located on an elevated round-shaped platform. The building has two wings extending to the right and left; the tomb of the former archbishop Philippe Nguyễn Kim Điền (1921–1988) is on the left and a shrine dedicated to Saint Paul Tống Viết Bường, one of the Vietnamese Martyrs, is on the right. In front of the building are two statues: Saint Peter is on the right and on the left is Saint Paul and other missionaries of the Archdiocese of Huế.

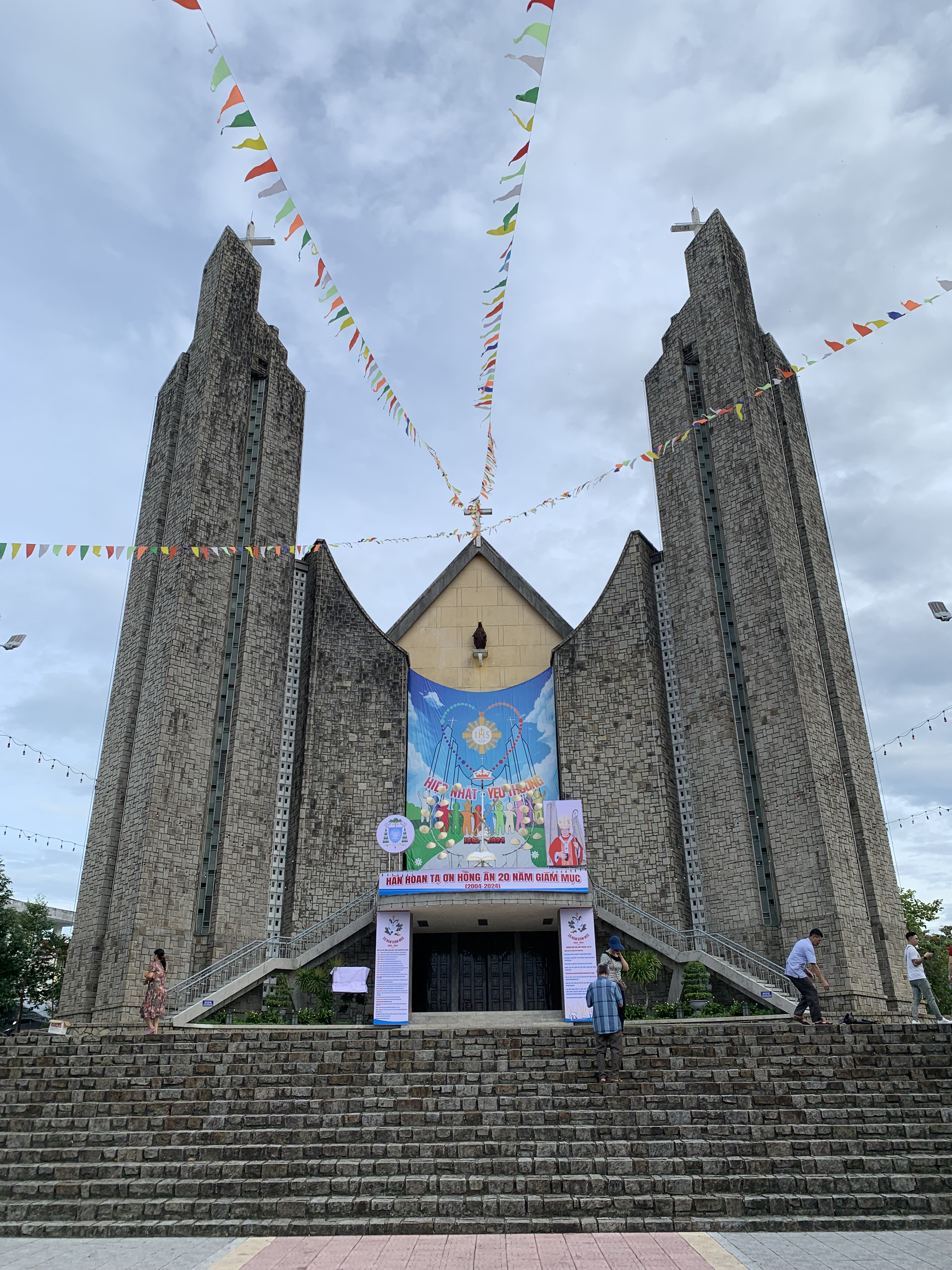
The façade has three sections. The main section in the middle is curved and significantly shorter than the two towering outer sections, making it look like an open Bible in perspective.

== See also ==
- Catholic Church in Vietnam
