= Marcel Nguyễn Tân Văn =

Vietnamese Redemptorist brother (1928–1959)

Servant of God Marcel Van CSsR
- Born: March 15, 1928; Ngăm Giáo, near Bắc Ninh (Vietnam)
- Died: July 10, 1959 (aged 31); Internment camp at Yen Binh, (North Vietnam)

Marcel Nguyễn Tân Văn (March 15, 1928 – July 10, 1959) was a Vietnamese Redemptorist brother. During his life, he reported receiving messages and visions from Thérèse of Lisieux, Jesus Christ, and the Blessed Virgin Mary. He is called "The Apostle of Love", continuing the teachings of Therese of Lisieux's "Little Way." He died in a North Vietnamese internment camp. His cause for beatification was opened in 1997 by archbishop Nguyễn Văn Thuận. Van called himself "Little brother of the Christ Child".

== Biography ==
=== Early childhood (1928-1935) ===
Nguyễn Tân Văn was born to a devout Catholic family in Ngam Giao, a village in northern Vietnam. Van was baptized under the patronage of Saint Joachim. During his childhood, he was joyful and mischievous. As early as the age of three, he often expressed a desire to become a saint. When his sister Anne-Marie Tê was born in 1932, his family sent him to live with his aunt, since they considered his excessive displays of affection dangerous for the newborn child. He returned to live with his parents two years later at age six.

Since Van then wanted to make his First Communion, his pastor allowed him to begin his catechism. Despite his young age, Van made his First Holy Communion six months later, as he had been well prepared by his mother. On that day, he asked the Lord for two graces:

1. To keep his heart pure so that he could love Him with all his heart.
2. To give all men and women a perfect and rock solid faith.

=== Rectory at Huu-Bang (1935–1941) ===
Expressing a strong desire to become a priest, in May 1935 his mother took Van to live with the priest Joseph Nha in the rectory of Huu-Bang, where he would receive special preparation for the priesthood. Such arrangements were common in Vietnam during that time period, and several other boys lived with Van. As at Ngam Giao, Van had permission to receive Holy Communion every day. This brought about admiration from his peers, but eventually made some of the adult catechists jealous. One of them, Master Vinh, made his life particularly difficult. He tormented Van severely, allowing him to receive Holy communion only on days when he agreed to be beaten, depriving him of food, and preventing him from reciting his rosary. The pastor was unaware of all this. Van courageously resisted, attributing his strength to his devotion to the Blessed Virgin Mary. "Thanks to her", he writes, "The devil was never able to win." Eventually, the catechist was punished by the pastor for misbehaving and left the rectory.

In 1936, when Van was eight, two typhoons struck the region in quick succession, causing famine and destroying his family's farm. They fell into deep poverty and were unable to financially support his education. He was then forced to become a servant at the rectory, and put to the side his preparation for the priesthood. The pastor exploited him as a slave. After Van obtained his primary school education at 12 years old, Nha definitively stopped his formation.

Due to these severe difficulties, and seeing that he would no longer receive training to become a priest, Van escaped. He wandered around for some time, was temporarily homeless, and eventually was able to return to his family. His time there was also difficult, since they thought that he was guilty of bad behavior, and such rumors had been circulated in the village. Nha eventually visited his family, declaring him innocent of any wrong, and Van eventually agreed to return to work at the rectory of Huu-Bang. But this time, he started with the other boys a resistance league to improve the spiritual poverty that had settled there, and encourage each other in the practice of virtue.

=== Minor seminary (1942-1943) ===
In 1942, at age 13 Van entered the minor seminary of Lan-Song, which was under the responsibility of Dominican friars. But after only six months of studies, it was closed and occupied by the Japanese military. Van then continued his studies at the rectory of St. Thérèse's parish in Qang Uyên, under Maillet, a Dominican missionary. In the summer of 1942, it was there that he discovered Therese of Lisieux's autobiography, the Story of a Soul, which was a turning point in his spiritual life. Indeed, Van had felt in his heart for a long time an ardent desire to become a saint, but knew his own weakness. He knew that holiness through harsh penances and exercises would be impossible for him to achieve. Therese's book showed him that holiness is possible even for the little ones, and from then on she was his spiritual sister.

A short time afterwards, Van recounted having Therese appear to him and speak with him familiarly, and that this occurred on a regular basis for a period. According to Van, she personally taught him her "little way," and asked him to pray for the French, whom he had previously disliked due to their colonisation of Vietnam. Thérèse spoke to him about God, his love, his paternity, and invited him to converse with God as would two friends. She showed him that God, in fact, was interested in the everyday things of our lives.

Soon after, Van had a vision of Alphonsus Liguori, founder of the Redemptorists, though Van only recognized him later, at first believing that it had been Our Lady of Sorrows. Upon reading a Redemptorist publication he felt the desire to join the order, and he recounted a little later that Therese also encouraged him in this vocation. But the missionary who had been educating him, Maillet, had plans to send him to a Dominican seminary and was shocked at Van's refusal. This being one of a string of misunderstandings, and thinking that Van was being stubborn and prideful, Maillet drove him away for the minor seminary in June 1943. He then returned to the rectory of Huu-Bang, before staying briefly with his family.

=== Redemptorists (1944-1959) ===
In June 1944, Van was accepted at the Redemptorist convent in Hanoi. He arrived on July 16, but was sent home due to his small size, since the religious brothers had a heavy work load. In effect, though he was 16 years old, he looked like he was 12. However, by his prayer and perseverance he was admitted three months later to the community, and became a postulant on October 17, receiving the name Marcel. In his biography, Van indicated that it was during this period that he had his conversations with Jesus. At the request of the novice master, Van wrote the story of his childhood, as well as his conversations with Jesus, Mary and Therese. After initial difficulties, notably due to his young age and small size, he eventually became an exemplary religious.

In July 1954, after the Geneva Accords, Vietnam was split in two. While many Christians were fleeing to seek refuge in South Vietnam, Marcel Van asked to return to the north which had become communist. He was arrested on May 7, 1955, and was tried and sentenced to 15 years hard labor but he died after 4 years of imprisonment.

He spent much of his time in prison ministering to the other prisoners, and was a great source of comfort for many of them. Witnesses described him as being radiant in faith, peace and joy. He died from exhaustion, tuberculosis and beriberi on July 10, 1959, at the age of 31. In December 1949, he had written to his superiors: "Who can know the power of love, who can know the sweetness... there will come a day when I will die, but I will die consumed by love".

== Spirituality ==
Marcel Van's spirituality was heavily influenced by Therese of Lisieux's "Little Way," as well as by Alphonsus Liguori, the founder of the Redemptorist order. He was a model of intense faith lived in simplicity, humility and trust in God, with a joyful and playful nature. Due to the intense trials he went through, he was also deeply united to Jesus’ sacrifice on the cross throughout his life.

A religious order located in Argancy, France, "Les Missionaires de l’Amour de Jésus" (The Missionaries of Jesus’ Love), has been founded based on the spiritualities of Marcel Van and Saint Therese of Lisieux.

== The Conversations ==
In the foreword to the Conversations, Cardinal Christoph Schönborn has written on their spiritual and doctrinal value. While he reminds the reader that it is the church's prerogative to authenticate such happenings, he states that: "The message that little Van transmits to us is of a theological and spiritual accuracy which far surpasses his own intellectual knowledge." Summarizing the general message of the Conversations, Schönborn says that what is "at the heart of little Van’s experience and message: his unbounded confidence in Him who is Love."

=== Unbaptized children ===
In the Conversations, this passage (spoken by Jesus) suggests a solution to the Catholic debate on the salvation of unbaptized children:

Offer Me your will and I will put it in the souls of children on earth. Henceforth you can rest assured that all little children already belong to Me... Children saved in this manner are baptized in Love itself. They are allowed to confess their faith in love. This act of love is accomplished by will.

== Beatification ==
The process of beatification for Marcel Van was opened in the Roman Catholic Diocese of Belley-Ars on March 26, 1997, with Cardinal Francis-Xavier Nguyen Van Thuan as the first General Postulator. The current actor for Marcel Van's beatification is the French association "Les Amis de Van."

== Complete works ==
Antonio Boucher, a French Canadian Redemptorist, was Marcel Van's spiritual director. After Van's death, Boucher spent 20 years compiling and translating his writings from Vietnamese into French. Since he mastered the Vietnamese language and knew Van intimately, his translation is considered to be of a very high quality.

Boucher wrote about the Conversations: "When reading the text, I felt that this very little brother whom Jesus, Mary and Therese guided by the hand, would have a role to play in the Church and in the world. Also, I felt pressured not to lose this treasure that passed through my eyes, through my hands and through my heart. I humbly admit that Br. Marcel taught me more about the spiritual life than I taught him."

Marcel Van's writings are divided into four volumes:

- Autobiography. Which was written in obedience to his novice master and spiritual director.
- Conversations. Which were interior conversations that Marcel had with Jesus, Mary and St. Therese.
- Correspondence. This includes letters to his spiritual director, to his sister Anne-Marie, superiors, confreres, family and friends.
- Other Works. This includes poems, letters to Jesus, etc.

Besides French and English, his spiritual writings are so far partially or fully translated into Italian, Portuguese, Spanish, German, Croatian and Russian.

== Devotion ==
Văn is one of the patrons of Croatian music group Duhovni kutak, which published a translation of his Autobiography in Croatian in 2020.

== Bibliography ==
In English:

- The Complete Works, in four volumes:
  - Autobiography, by Marcel Van, foreword by Cardinal Ngyuen Van Thuan, Amis de Van Editions, 2005
  - Conversations, by Marcel Van, foreword by Cardinal Christoph Schönborn, Amis de Van Editions, 2001
  - Correspondence, by Marcel Van, foreword by Archbishop Renato Boccardo, Amis de Van Editions, 2006
  - The Other Works are currently being translated into English, as of January 2016.
- Short History of Van, by Fr. Antonio Boucher, foreword by Cardinal Ngyuen Van Thuan, Amis de Van Editions, 2001
- Marcel Van: the Trial of Love, by Catherine Saint-Pierre, Magnificat Editions, 2006
- The Combat of Love, by Alexandre Ilic and Catherine Bouvier, Amis de Van Editions, 2014

In French:

- The Complete Works, in four volumes:
  - Autobiographie, foreword by Cardinal Ngyuen Van Thuan, Amis de Van Editions, 2000
  - Colloques, foreword by Cardinal Christoph Schönborn, Amis de Van Editions, 2001
  - Correspondances, foreword by Archbishop Renato Boccardo, Amis de Van Editions, 2006
  - Autres Écrits, foreword by Cardinal Marc Ouellet, Amis de Van Editions, 2014
- Petite histoire de Van, Père Antonio Boucher CSsR, Amis de Van Editions, 2001
- Marcel Van, ou l'infini pauvreté de l'Amour, Père Gilles Berceville OP, Éditions de l'Emmanuel/Amis de Van, 2009
- Tu as du prix à mes yeux, Conference presented by the Père Gilles Berceville, OP, Éditions de l’Emmanuel/Amis de Van, 2010
- Quel est ton secret, petit Van ?, Collective, Amis de Van Editions, 2000
- Van, petit frère de Thérèse Revue Vianney n°80, Alain d'Orange, Mission Thérésienne, juin 2004
- Une pensée par jour, Texts assembled by Sophie Hudault, Médiaspaul, 2012
- Van, dis-nous en qui tu crois, Bénédicte Delélis, Anne-Sophie Rahm, Eric Puybaret, MAME - Graine de Saints, 2013
- Les voyages de Van, Carnet de voyage, Camille Ledigarcher, Alexandre Ilic, Amis de Van Editions, 2014
- Prier 15 jours, Père Jean-Philippe Auger, CSsR, Éditions Nouvelle Cité, 2012
- Le Combat de l’Amour, (Manga), Alexandre Ilic, Catherine Bouvier, Amis de Van Editions, 2014
- Van, la force de l’amour, (Comic book), Christelle Pécout, Gwendolyn Levier, Amis de Van Editions, 2015

Collection "Une mission extraordinaire" ("An Extraordinary Mission"):

- 1) La grâce d’une mère admirable, Georgette Blaquière, Amis de Van Editions
- 2) Un saint de poche, Renée de Tryon-Montalembert, Amis de Van Editions
- 3) Ô Marie, tu es ma véritable mère, Père Eric de Kermadec, Amis de Van Editions
- 4) Van, un fils de Saint Alphonse, Père Joseph Lê Phung, CSsR et Père Dominique Joly, CSsR, Amis de Van Editions
- 5) Van, petit frère spirituel de Thérèse, Père Pierre Descouvemont et Monseigneur Guy Gaucher, Amis de Van Editions
- 6) Un novice à l’école de l’Amour, Père Olivier de Roulhac, OSB, Amis de Van Editions
- 7) Van et la relation sponsale à Jésus, Père Francis Frost, Amis de Van Editions
- 8) "Mon âme est mère", Père Jules Mimeault, CSsR, Amis de Van Editions
- 9) L’âme sacerdotale, Père Jean-Christophe Thibaut, Amis de Van Editions
- 10) Van s’efface pour laisser parler Dieu, Père Antoine Birot, Amis de Van Editions
- 11) Les missions de Van, Père Olivier de Roulhac, OSB, Amis de Van Editions
- 12) Les armes de Van dans les combats de la vie, Grégoire Corneloup, Amis de Van Editions
- 13) Le mystère de la souffrance chez Van, Père Olivier de Roulhac, OSB, Amis de Van Editions
- 14) Van, en route vers la sainteté à travers les blessures de la vie, Bernadette Lemoine, Amis de Van Editions
- 15) Van, un veilleur dans l’amour, Père Olivier de Roulhac, OSB, Amis de Van Editions
- 16) Avec Marcel Van, redécouvrons la filiation, Père Jules Mimeault, CSsR, Amis de Van Editions
- 17) Van, enraciné dans la foi et dans l’amour, Père Louis Pelletier, Amis de Van Editions
- 18) La famille asiatique dépassée ou prophétique?, Elizabeth Nguyên, Amis de Van Editions
- 19) Van : un enfant devenu prophète de la vie, Père Dominique Joly, CSsR, Amis de Van Editions
- 20) Thérèse et Van- souffrance et joie: le paradoxe de l’amour, Père Louis Menvielle, Amis de Van Editions
- 21) L’enfance sauvera le monde - Témoignage de Marcel Van et de Georges Bernanos, Père Gilles Berceville, OP, Amis de Van Editions.
- 22) Le salut des enfants non baptisés, Laurent Aventin, Amis de Van Editions.

Collection "Prier avec Van" ("Praying with Van"):

- Rosaire en 35 mystères sur 7 jours, Père Jules Mimeault, CSsR, Amis de Van Editions.
- Chemin de croix – textes tirés des écrits de Marcel Van, Amis de Van Editions.
- Neuvaine avec Marcel Van, Amis de Van Editions.

== Sources ==
- « Marcel Van, Un coeur à coeur avec Jésus » (accessed September 10, 2013)
- "Les Amis de Van" [archive], on Les Amis de Van, amisdevan.org (accessed September 10, 2013)
