= Johann Bernhard Brinkmann =

Roman Catholic bishop

His Excellency Johann Bernhard Brinkmann
- Bishop of Münster
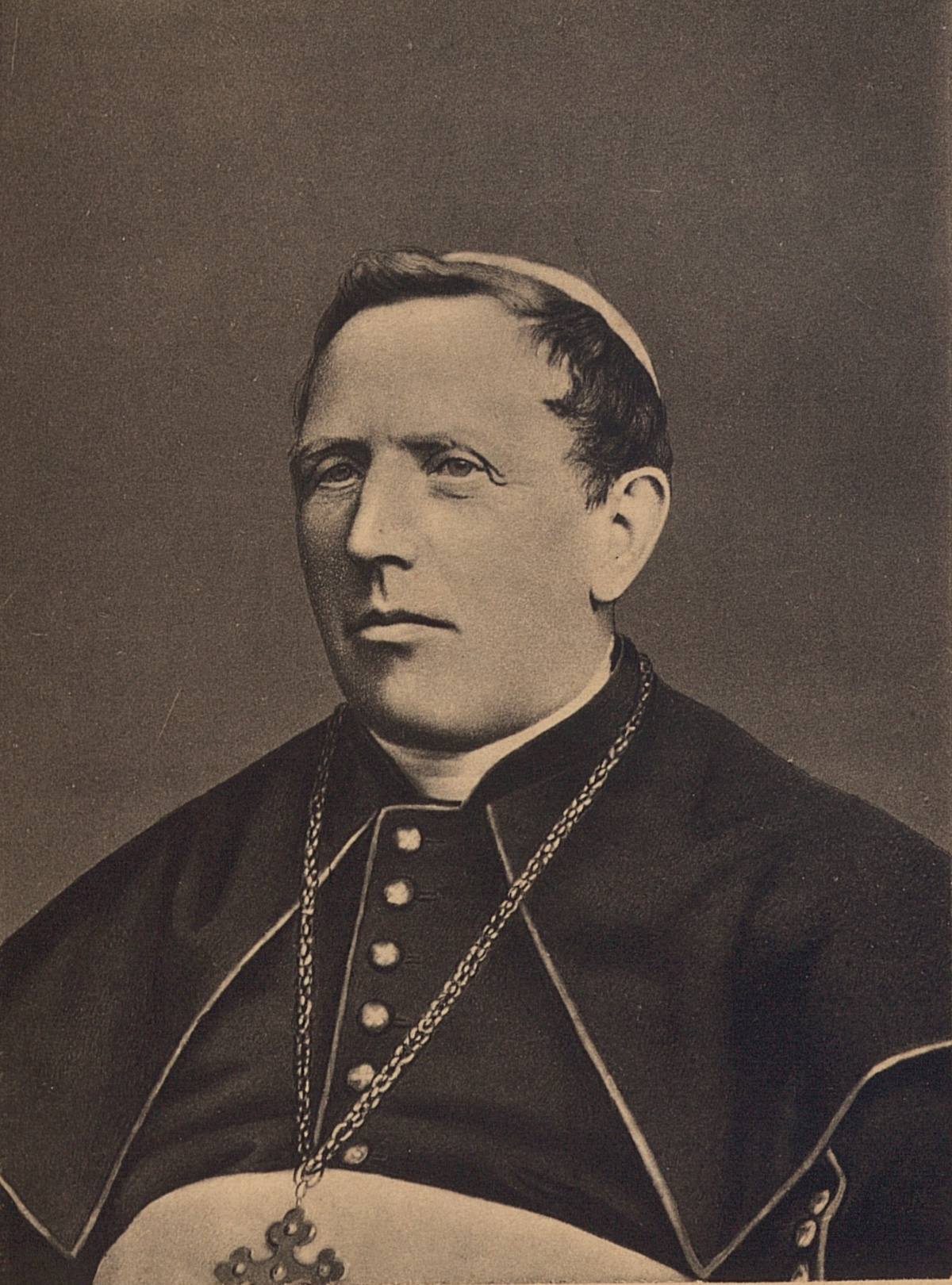
- Bishop Johann Bernhard Brinkmann
- Diocese: Münster
- See: Münster
- Appointed: 6 April 1870
- Installed: 27 June 1870
- Term ended: 13 April 1889
- Predecessor: Johann Georg Müller
- Successor: Hermann Jakob Dingelstad

Orders
- Ordination: 25 May 1839 by Johannes Scheifes
- Consecration: 4 October 1870 by Paul Ludolf Melchers, S.J.

Personal details
- Born: 4 February 1813 Everswinkel
- Died: 13 April 1889 (aged 76)
- Denomination: Roman Catholic

Johannes Bernhard Brinkmann, also known as Johann Bernhard Brinkmann (4 February 1813 – 13 April 1889), was a Roman Catholic theologian and Bishop of Münster from 1870 to 1889.

== Life ==
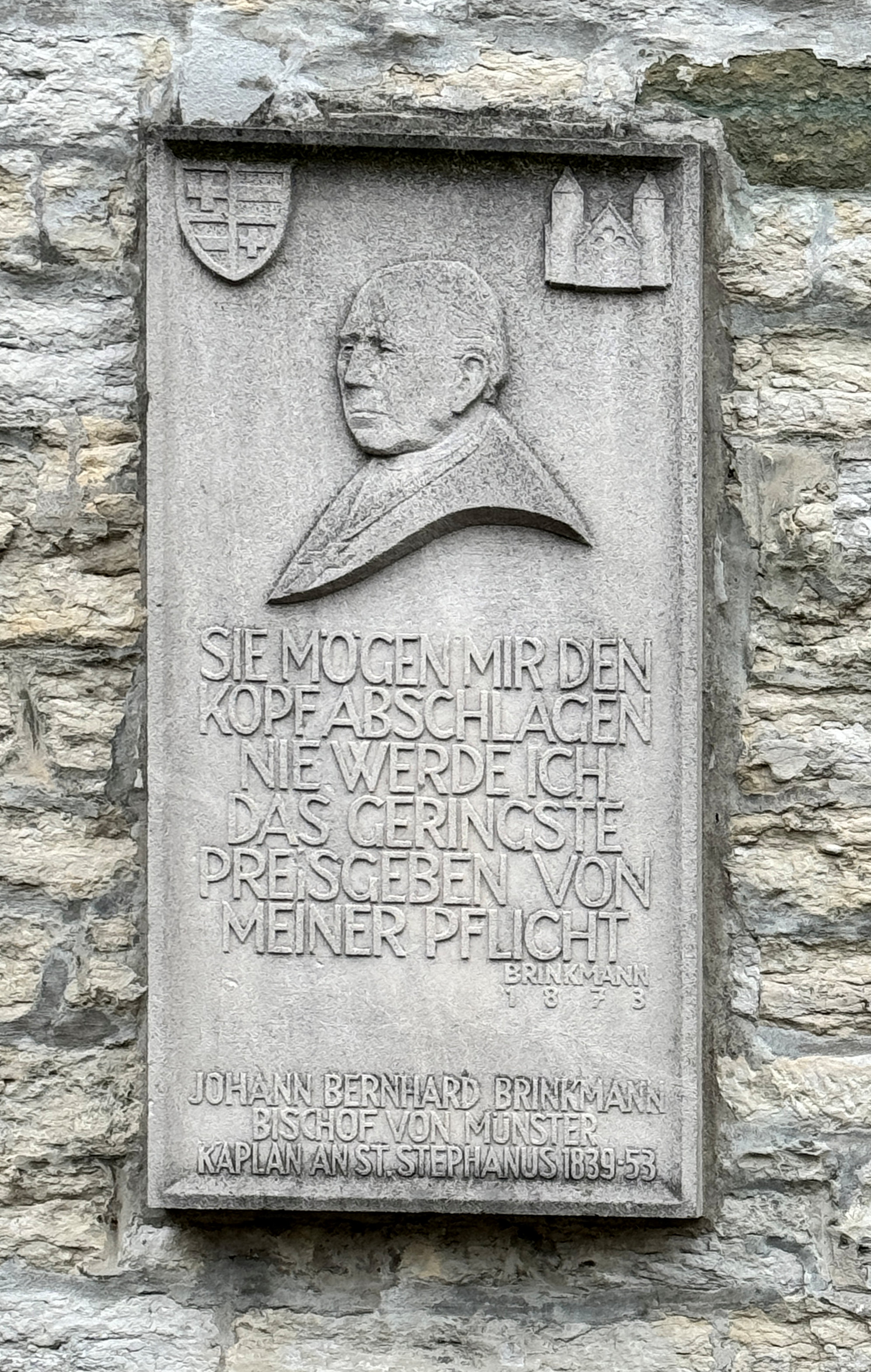
The memorial of Johann Bernhard Brinkmann in Beckum

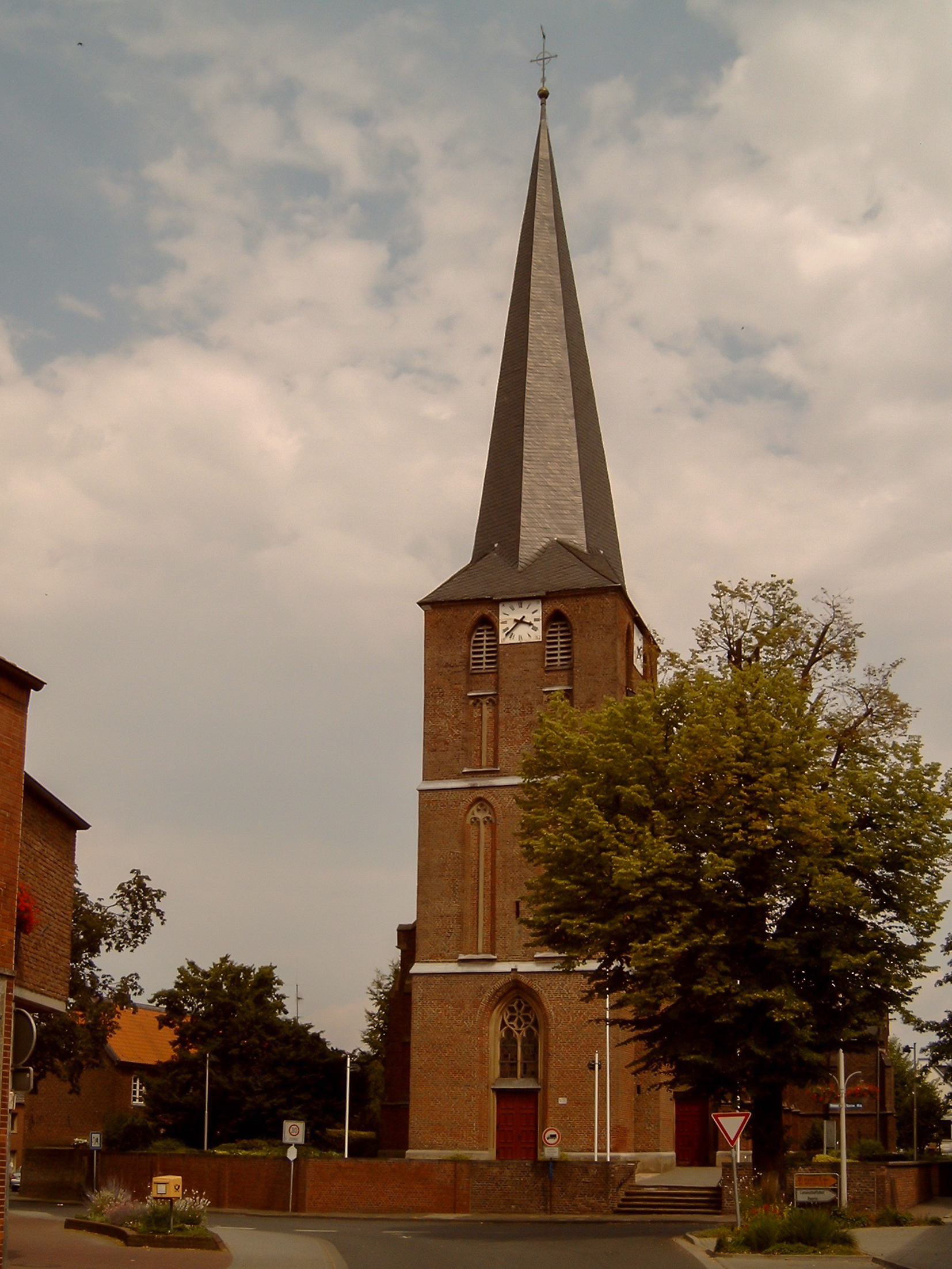
St. Lambertus church in Leuth

His birthplace, the Bishop's House, still stands in Everswinkel on the west side of St. Magnus Church. At his father's request, Brinkmann as the only son was supposed to learn the woodturning trade after attending elementary school. However, he resisted this and did military service.

After studying Theology and being ordained a priest in 1839, Brinkmann pursued a straightforward career. For thirteen years, he served as a chaplain in Beckum, and from 1854 to 1858, he was rector of the Marian pilgrimage site in Kevelaer, where he founded the Congregation of Secular Priests of Kevelaer. In 1857, he became Vicar General of the Diocese of Münster, and in 1870, he was elected its bishop. He was consecrated bishop on 4 October 1870, by the then Archbishop of Cologne and later Cardinal Paulus Melchers, SJ.

During the Kulturkampf, he was deposed and charged by Prussia in 1875 for violating the Kulturkampf laws (He was imprisoned for forty days by the Prussian government the same year). He preempted his deposition by going into exile in the Netherlands, where he lived under an assumed name in Leuth, near the Dutch border, in the rectory of the parish of St. Lambertus. Through his confidants (i.e., the also deposed district administrator of Münster, Heinrich von Droste zu Hülshoff), he retained indirect influence over events in his diocese. Only after the repeal of the Kulturkampf laws and nine years of exile did the bishop return to Münster in 1884, where he received a triumphant welcome as "Confessor Bishop" of the Diocese. Around 30,000 people gathered in front of the west portal of the cathedral to receive his blessing. The bishop dedicated the diocese to the Sacred Heart of Jesus after his return from exile. He died in 1889 after a short illness and was buried in the choir of the Münster Cathedral.

== Remembrance ==
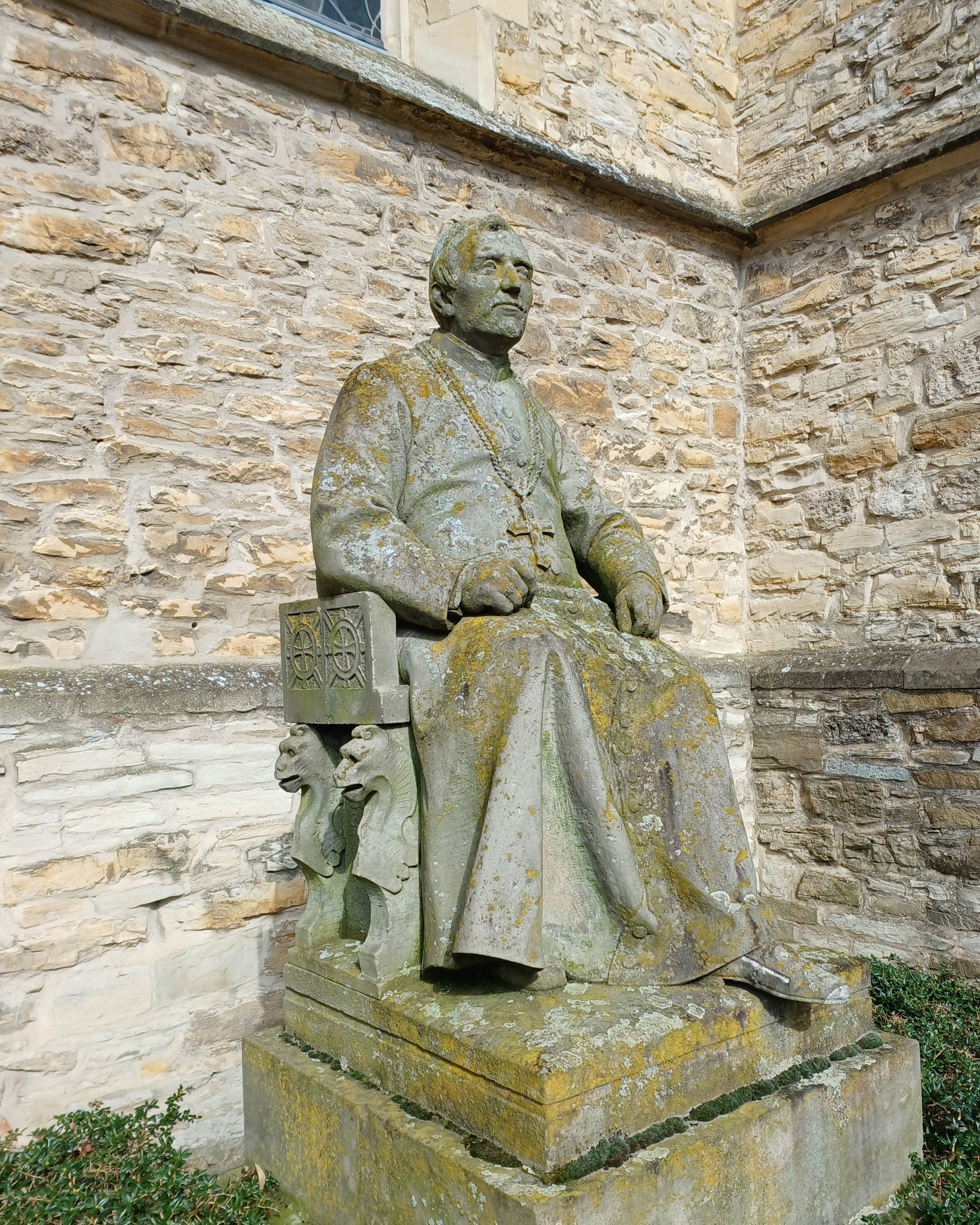
Monument in the church square by sculptor August Schmiemann (1913)

In Everswinkel, a monument to Bishop Brinkmann stands in the church square of St. Magnus. Created by sculptor August Schmiemann in 1913 to commemorate the bishop's 100th birthday, the monument depicts the bishop in full vestments, seated on his throne, life-size.

== See also ==
- Nguyễn Văn Thuận

Catholic Church titles
Preceded by Johann Georg Müller	Bishop of Münster; 1870–1889	Succeeded by Hermann Jakob Dingelstad
