= François Lemasle =

French bishop (1874–1946)

François Lemasle MEP
- Vicar Apostolic of Huế; Titular Bishop of Teuchira
- Church: Roman Catholic Church
- Archdiocese: Huế
- See: Diocese of Teuchira
- Installed: 4 February 1937
- Term ended: 26 September 1946
- Predecessor: Alexandre Chabanon (Huế); Johann Baptist Hierl (Teuchira)
- Successor: Jean-Baptiste Urrutia (Huế)

Orders
- Ordination: 26 June 1898 by Alexandre Cardot
- Consecration: 27 May 1937 by Ange-Marie Gouin

Personal details
- Born: François-Arsène-Jean-Marie-Eugène Lemasle; 19 December 1874 Servon, Manche, France
- Died: 26 September 1946 (aged 71) Saigon, French Cochinchina, French colonial empire

François-Arsène-Jean-Marie-Eugène Lemasle (19 December 1874 – 26 September 1946) was a French Roman Catholic prelate and missionary. He was ordained a deacon on 5 March 1898 by Alexandre Cardot, and was ordained a priest on 26 June 1898 by Cardot as well. On 4 February 1937, Lemasle was appointed as the Vicar Apostolic of the Archdiocese of Huế and the Titular Bishop of the Diocese of Teuchira. Lemasle was consecrated a bishop on 27 May 1937 by Ange-Marie Joseph Gouin.
