= Ngô Viết Thụ =

Vietnamese architect

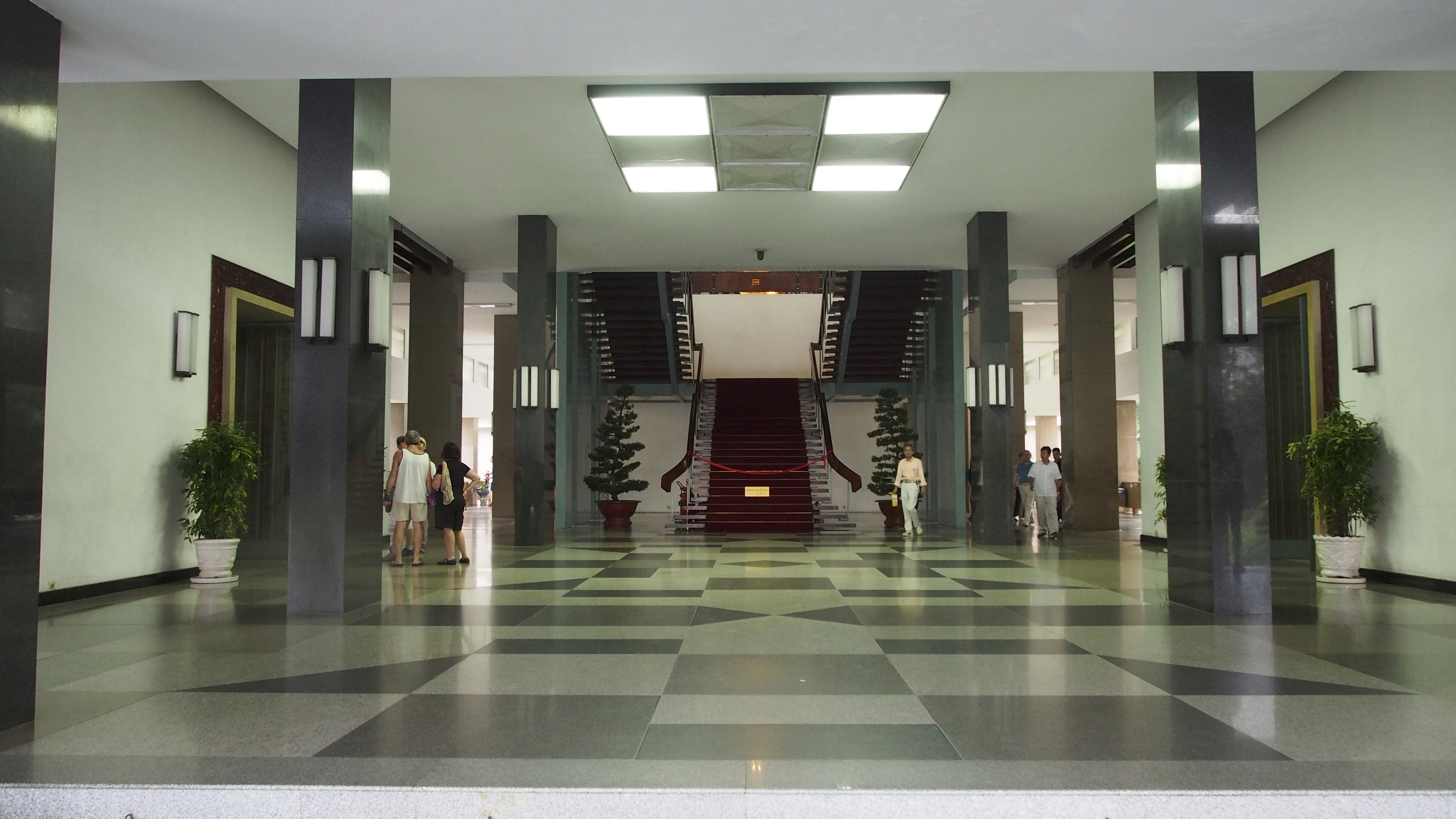
Independence Palace (Dinh Độc Lập), also known as Reunification Palace (Vietnamese: Dinh Thống Nhất), built on the site of the former Norodom Palace, is a landmark in Ho Chi Minh City, Vietnam. It was designed by architect Ngô Viết Thụ and was the home and workplace of the President of South Vietnam during the Vietnam War. It was the site of the end of the Vietnam War during the Fall of Saigon on April 30, 1975, when a North Vietnamese Army tank crashed through its gates. Wikipedia

Ngô Viết Thụ (17 September 1927 – 3 September 2000) was a Vietnamese architect.

Ngô Viết Thụ was born on 17 September 1927 in Thừa Thiên, French Indochina. He married Võ Thị Cơ and had eight children, one of whom, Dr. Ngô Viết Nam Sơn, is also an architect and planner, working both in the United States and in Vietnam.

He studied architecture at the École supérieure d'architecture in Đà Lạt, before transferring to study at the École des Beaux-Arts in Paris. He graduated and won the First Grand Prize of Rome (Grand Prix de Rome) in 1955, the highest recognition of Beaux-Arts schools for an architect in France. From 1955 to 1958, he became resident at the Villa Medicis (Rome), sponsored by the Academy of France, to conduct research in architecture and urban planning. During that time, his research was exhibited annually, together with the works of other Grand Prix de Rome's residents, with the presence of the Presidents of France and Italy during the opening days. After working on several projects in Paris and in London, he was invited by President Ngô Đình Diệm to return to Vietnam to work on national projects in1960.

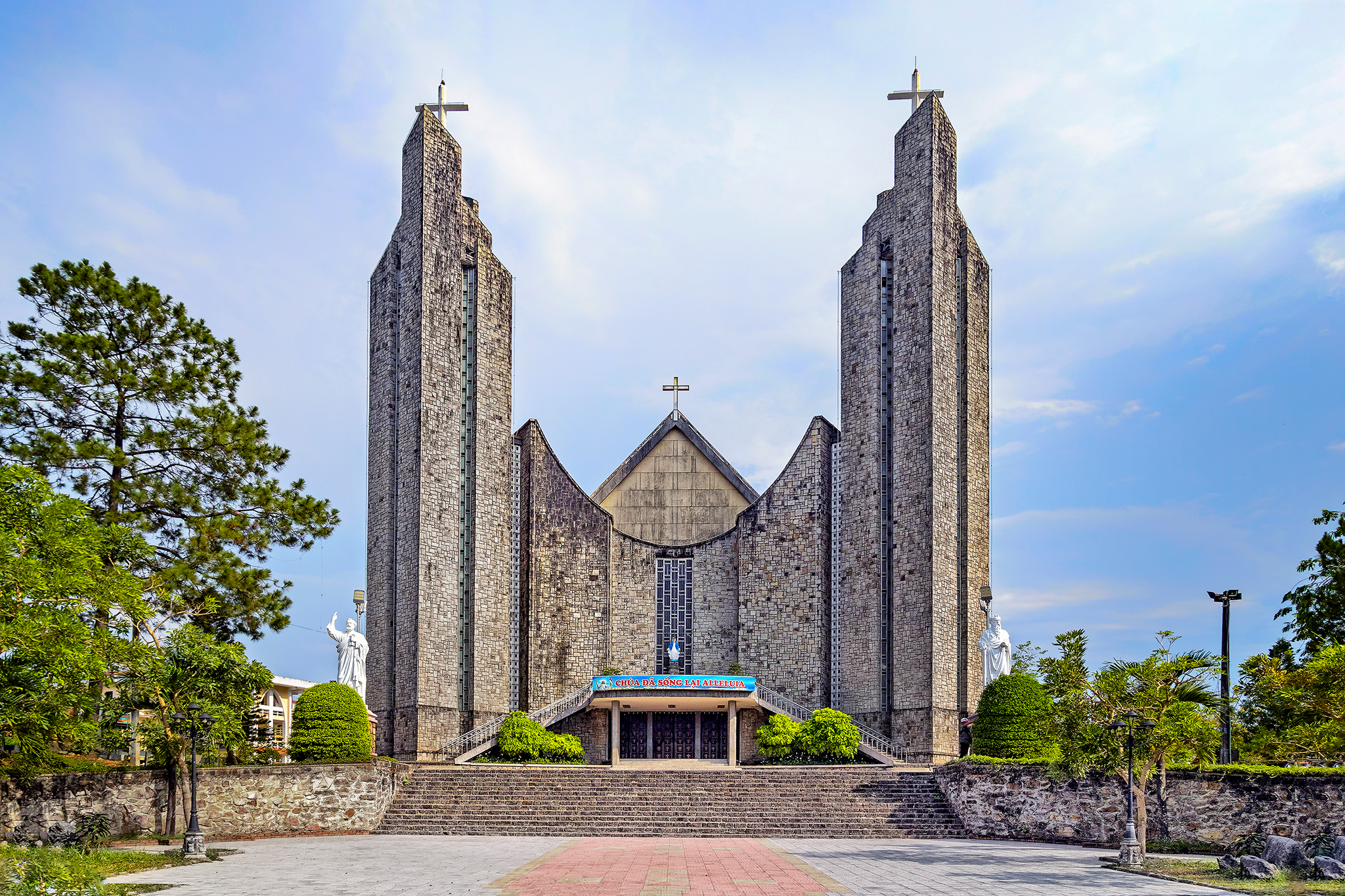
Phủ Cam Cathedral

In 1962, he was the first Asian architect to become an Honorary Fellow of the American Institute of Architects. He designed the Independence Palace (also known as the Presidential Palace, 1962–66, later renamed Reunification Palace, on 30 April 1975) in Ho Chi Minh City, Huế University's campus (1961–63), Atomic Research Center at Đà Lạt (1962–1965), Thủ Đức University Campus (1962), Hương Giang 1 Hotel in Huế (1962), Phủ Cam Cathedral (1963), the Air Vietnam Headquarters (1972), the Agriculture University in Thủ Đức (1975), Sông Bé Hospital (1985), Century Hotel in Huế (1990). He had associated with international architects in the design of University of Medicine of Saigon (Chief of Vietnamese Team, associating with CRS from Houston), International Art Center in Paris (collaborating with architects Paul Tournon and Olivier-Clément Cacoub). Aside from being an architect, he was an innovative painter. Two of his most famous paintings were "National Landscape" (displayed at the main dining room of the Independence Palace) and "Speed" (private collection).

== Death ==
Ngô Viết Thụ died on 3 September 2000 in Ho Chi Minh City, aged 72.
