= Francis Xavier Lê Văn Hồng =

Vietnamese Catholic prelate (born 1940)

The Most Reverend Francis Xavier Lê Văn Hồng
- Archbishop Emeritus of Huế
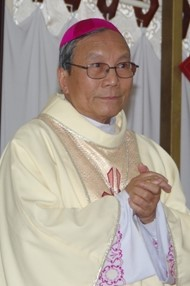
- Hồng in 2015
- Native name: Phanxicô Xaviê Lê Văn Hồng
- Archdiocese: Huế
- Province: Huế
- Appointed: 18 August 2012
- Installed: 20 August 2012
- Term ended: 29 October 2016
- Predecessor: Étienne Nguyễn Như Thể
- Successor: Joseph Nguyễn Chí Linh
- Other post: Vice President of the Catholic Bishops' Conference of Việt Nam (2013–2016)
- Previous post: Auxiliary Bishop of Huế & Titular Bishop of Gadiaufala (2005–2012)

Orders
- Ordination: 21 December 1969 by Jean-Baptiste Urrutia MEP
- Consecration: 7 April 2005 by Étienne Nguyễn Như Thể

Personal details
- Born: 30 June 1940 (age 86) Quảng Trị, Annam, French Indochina
- Motto: Sicut qui ministrat (As one who serves) (Như một người phục vụ)
- Styles
- Reference style: His Excellency; The Most Reverend
- Spoken style: Your Excellency
- Religious style: Your Excellency

Francis Xavier Lê Văn Hồng (born June 30, 1940) is a Vietnamese Catholic prelate who served as the fourth Archbishop of Huế from 2012 to 2016 and the Vice President of the Catholic Bishops' Conference of Vietnam.

== Biography ==
Lê Văn Hồng was born on June 30, 1940, in Quang Tri, Vietnam. After finishing his studies at Pontifical College of St. Pius X of Đà Lạt, he was ordained a priest for the Archdiocese of Huế on December 21, 1969. He was a professor at Hoan Thien minor seminary and served as a parish priest until he was sent to France for his further studies in 1999. He returned to Vietnam in 2002 and was in charge of pastoral activities for Phú Hậu Parish.

On February 19, 2005, he was named auxiliary bishop of Huế and was consecrated by Stephen Nguyễn Như Thể, Archbishop of Huế, on April 7 the same year.

He was appointed Archbishop of Huế on August 18, 2012, by Pope Benedict XVI, succeeding Thể after the latter's resignation due to the age limit.

On October 29, 2016, Pope Francis named Joseph Nguyễn Chí Linh as his successor.
