= Archdiocese of Huế =

Catholic archdiocese in central Vietnam

Coordinates: 16.4667°N 107.5830°E

Archdiocese of Huế Archidioecesis Hueensis Tổng Giáo Phận Huế

Catholic
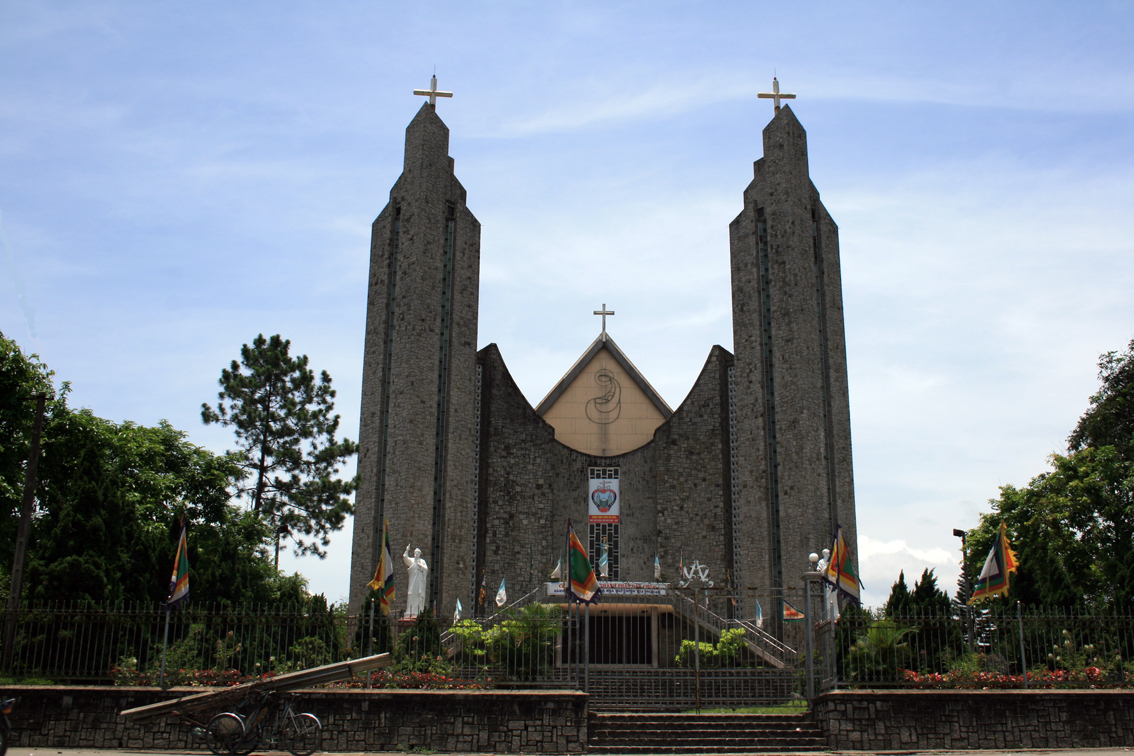
- Phủ Cam Cathedral

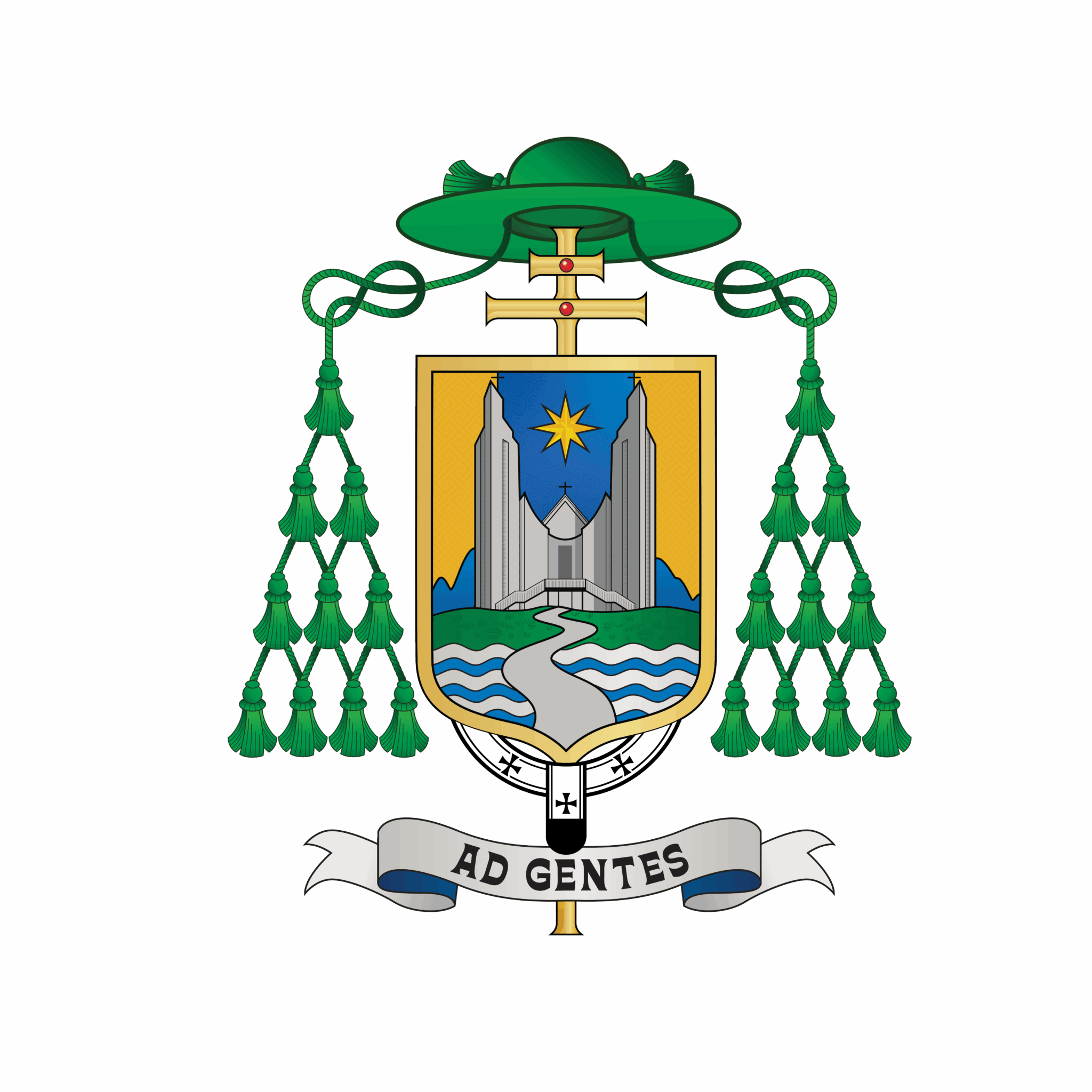
- Coat of arms of Archbishop Ngân

Location
- Country: Vietnam
- Ecclesiastical province: Huế

Statistics
- Area: 9,823 km^{2} (3,793 sq mi)
- Population: Total; Catholics: (as of 2022); 1,796,240; 68,303 (3.8%)
- Parishes: 96

Information
- Denomination: Roman Catholic
- Sui iuris church: Latin Church
- Rite: Roman Rite
- Established: 27 August 1850 - Established as Apostolic Vicariate; 24 November 1960 - Elevated as Metropolitan Archdiocese
- Cathedral: Cathedral of the Immaculate Heart of Mary
- Patron saint: Our Lady of La Vang
- Secular priests: 143

Current leadership
- Pope: Leo XIV
- Metropolitan Archbishop: Joseph Ðặng Ðức Ngân
- Bishops emeritus: Joseph Nguyễn Chí Linh; Francis Xavier Lê Văn Hồng

Map
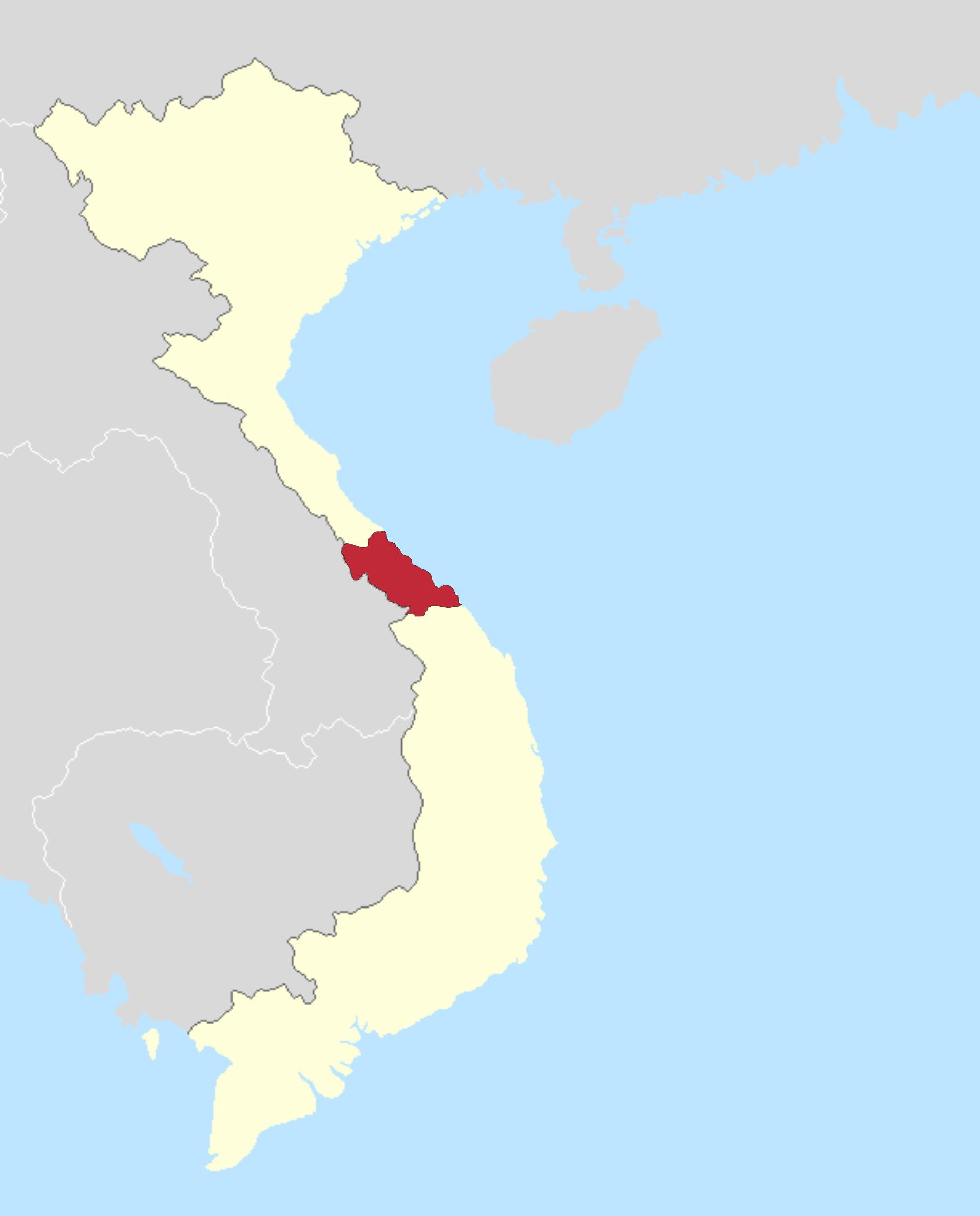

Website
- tonggiaophanhue.net

The Archdiocese of Huế (Latin: Archidioecesis Huéensis) is a Roman Catholic Archdiocese in central Vietnam.

The creation of the archdiocese in its present form was declared on 24 November 1960. It covers an area of 12,227 km^{2} and has been under the leadership of Archbishop Joseph Nguyễn Chí Linh, who was previously the Bishop of Thanh Hóa, since 2016.

The suffragan dioceses are:

- Diocese of Ban Mê Thuột
- Diocese of Đà Nẵng
- Diocese of Kontum
- Diocese of Nha Trang
- Diocese of Quy Nhơn.

Immaculate Heart of Mary Cathedral in Huế has been assigned as the cathedral of the archdiocese.

By 2004, the Archdiocese of Huế had about 65,770 Roman Catholics (3.3% of the population), 93 priests and 177 parishes.

== Ordinaries ==
=== Vicars Apostolic of Northern Cochin (1850–1924) ===
Vicar Apostolic		Period in office	Status	Reference
1	Bishop François-Marie-Henri-Agathon Pellerin, M.E.P.	August 27, 1850 – September 13, 1862	Died in office	
2	Bishop Joseph-Hyacinthe Sohier, M.E.P.	September 13, 1862 – September 03, 1876	Died in office	
3	Bishop Martin-Jean Pontrianne, M.E.P.	August 31, 1877 – July 30, 1879	Died in office	
4	Bishop Louis-Marie-Antoine Caspar, M.E.P.	March 23, 1880 – July 18, 1907	Resigned	
5	Bishop Eugène-Marie-Joseph Allys, M.E.P.	January 30, 1908 – December 03, 1924	Remained as Vicar Apostolic of Huê.	

=== Vicars Apostolic of Huế (1924–1960) ===
Vicar Apostolic		Period in office	Status	Reference
1	Bishop Eugène-Marie-Joseph Allys, M.E.P.	December 03, 1924 – June 20, 1931	Resigned	
2	Bishop Alexandre-Paul-Marie Chabanon, M.E.P.	June 20, 1931 – June 04, 1936	Died in Office	
3	Bishop François-Arsène-Jean-Marie-Eugène Lemasle, M.E.P.	February 04, 1937 – September 26, 1946	Died in Office	
4	Bishop Jean-Baptiste Urrutia, M.E.P.	February 21, 1948 – November 24, 1960	Resigned	

=== Archbishops of Huế (1960–present) ===
Archbishop		Coat of Arms	Period in office	Status	Reference
1	Pierre-Martin Ngô Ðình Thục		24 November 1960 – 30 September 1964	Resigned	
2	Philippe Nguyễn Kim Điền PFI		11 March 1968 – 8 June 1988	Died in office	
–	Étienne Nguyễn Như Thể		23 March 1994 – 1 March 1998	Apostolic Administrator	
3	Étienne Nguyễn Như Thể		1 March 1998 – 18 August 2012	Resigned	
4	Francis Xavier Lê Văn Hồng		18 August 2012 – 29 October 2016	Resigned	
5	Joseph Nguyễn Chí Linh		29 October 2016 – 24 May 2025	Resigned	
6	Joseph Ðặng Ðức Ngân		24 May 2025 – present	Incumbent	

==== Coadjutor Vicar Apostolic of Northern Cochin (1850–1924) ====
Coadjutor Vicar Apostolic		Period in office	Reference
1	Bishop Joseph-Hyacinthe Sohier, M.E.P.	August 27, 1850 – September 13, 1862	

==== Coadjutor Vicar Apostolic of Huế (1924–1960) ====
Coadjutor Vicar Apostolic		Period in office	Reference
2	Bishop Alexandre-Paul-Marie Chabanon, M.E.P.	August 02, 1930 – June 20, 1931	

==== Coadjutor Archbishops of Huế (1960–present) ====
Coadjutor Archbishop	Coat of Arms	Period in office	Reference
1	Étienne Nguyễn Như Thể		September 07, 1975 – November 23, 1983
3	Joseph Ðặng Ðức Ngân		September 21, 2023 – May 24, 2025

==== Auxiliary Bishop of Huế (1960–present) ====
Auxiliary Bishop		Coat of Arms	Period in office	Reference
1	Jacques Lê Văn Mẫn		April 13, 1984 – December 7, 2001	
2	Francis Xavier Lê Văn Hồng		February 19, 2005 – August 18, 2012	

=== Other secular clergy who became bishops ===
- Dominique Marie Hồ Ngọc Cẩn, appointed Coadjutor Vicar Apostolic of Bùi Chu and Titular Bishop of Zenobias in 1935 and later succeeded
- Thaddeus Anselm Lê Hữu Từ O.Cist (deacon here until 1918), appointed Vicar Apostolic of Phát Diệm and Titular Bishop of Daphnusia in 1945
- Simon Hòa Nguyễn Văn Hiền, appointed Vicar Apostolic of Sài Gòn and Titular Bishop of Sagalasse in 1955 and later Bishop of Đà Lạt
- Francis-Xavier Nguyễn Văn Thuận, appointed Bishop of Nha Trang in 1967 and later appointed Titular Archbishop of Vadesi and Coadjutor Archbishop of Sài Gòn in 1975 (later appointed Vice President and President of the Pontifical Council for Justice and Peace) (elevated to Cardinal in 2001)
