= Francisco Xavier da Piedade Rebelo =

Indian Catholic prelate (1891 - 1975)

Dom Francisco Xavier da Piedade Rebelo
- Apostolic Administrator Emeritus of Goa e Damão India; Titular Bishop of Tipasa in Mauretania
- Church: Roman Catholic Church

Orders
- Ordination: 26 September 1915

Personal details
- Born: 4 September 1891; Margao, Goa, Portuguese India
- Died: 7 July 1975 (aged 83); Margao, Goa, India

Dom Bishop Francisco Xavier da Piedade Rebelo (September 4, 1891 – July 7, 1975) was a prelate of Goan origin, the first Goan to head the Archdiocese of Goa and Daman, as apostolic administrator.

== Early life ==
Rebello was born to João Fenelon da Piedade Rebelo and his wife Perciliana Esmeralda da Piedade de Miranda, in Margao, South Goa. He was ordained priest on September 26, 1915, incardinated in the Archdiocese of Goa and Daman.

== Religious appointments ==
On November 15, 1963, he was appointed auxiliary bishop of Goa, being consecrated on December 21, 1963 by James Robert Knox, apostolic nuncio in India, with the Bishop of Guntur, Ignatius Mummadi and the Bishop of Poona Andrew Alexis D'Souza co-consecrating .

With the withdrawal in 1966 of the Goa and Daman Archbishop Patriarch Dom José Vieira Alvernaz, after the takeover of Goa, Daman and Diu by the Indian Union, he was appointed apostolic administrator sede plena, until 1972, when he retired on grounds of age.

== Death ==
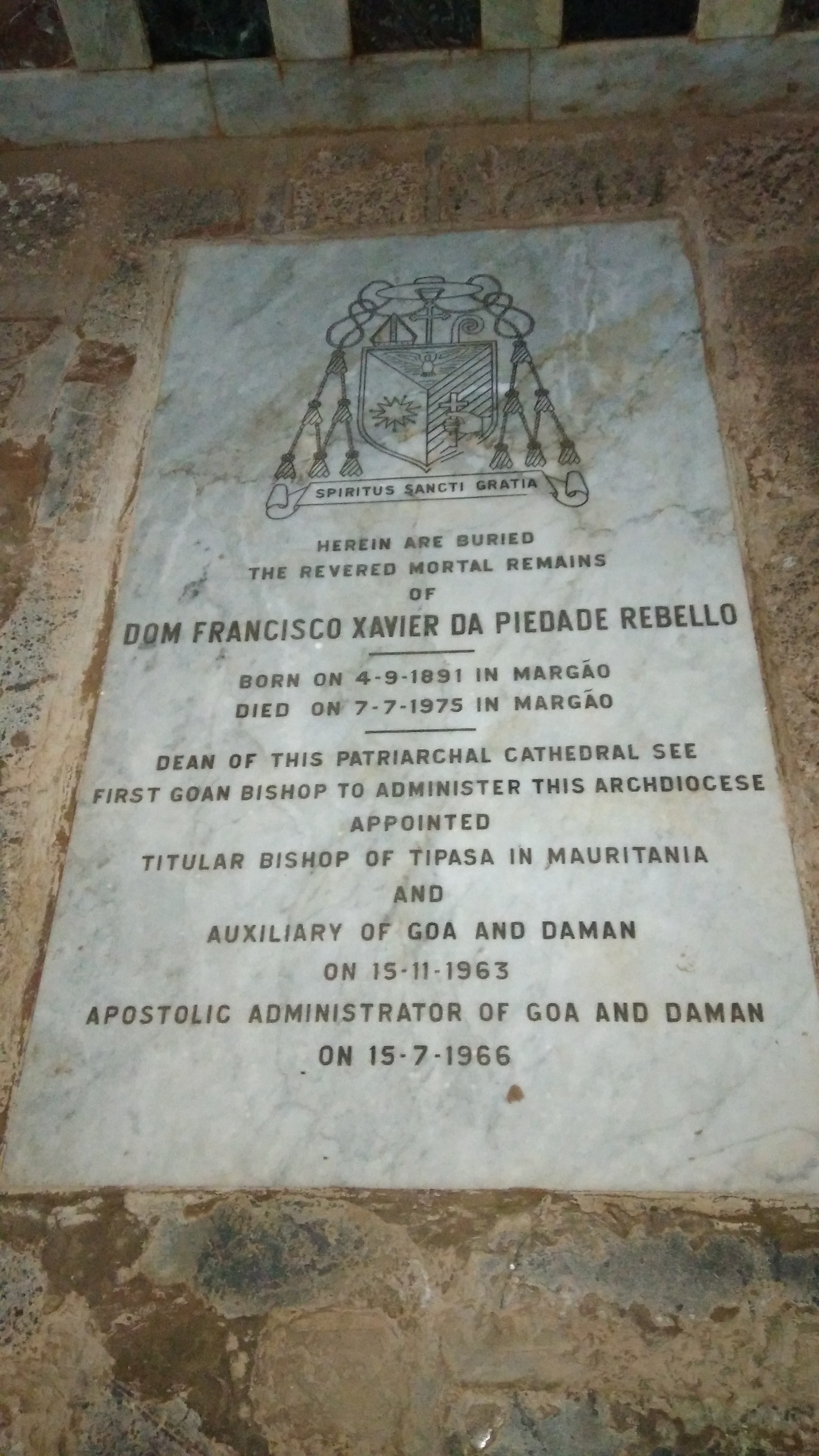
Burial place of Dom Francisco Xavier da Piedade Rebello inside Se Cathedral, Old Goa

He died in Margão, on 7 July 1975.

== Legacy ==
A prominent road in Fatorda, Margao, has been named in his honour.
