= Jean-Baptiste Urrutia =

French bishop (1901–1979)

His Excellency, The Most Reverend Jean-Baptiste Urrutia MEP
- Vicar Apostolic of Huế; Titular Archbishop of Isauropolis; Titular Archbishop of Carpathus
- Church: Roman Catholic Church
- Diocese: Huế
- See: Diocese of Isauropolis
- Installed: 12 February 1948
- Term ended: 24 November 1960
- Predecessor: François Lemasle (Huế); Stanislas Baudry (Isauropolis)
- Successor: Ngô Đình Thục (Huế); Philip Pocock (Isauropolis)

Orders
- Ordination: 6 June 1925 by Jean Budes de Guébriant
- Consecration: 27 May 1948 by Antonin Drapier

Personal details
- Born: 6 November 1901; Aldudes, Pyrénées-Atlantiques, France
- Died: 15 January 1979 (aged 77); Montbeton, Tarn-et-Garonne, France

Jean-Baptiste Urrutia (6 November 1901 – 15 January 1979) was a French Roman Catholic missionary from the Paris Foreign Missions Society. He was an attendee at the Second Vatican Council.

Ordained in 1925, he was sent to Annam in French Indochina. He taught at the An Ninh Minor Seminary, where he had François-Xavier Nguyễn Văn Thuận as a student. He ordained Thuận in 1953. Urrutia was consecrated bishop in partibus in 1948 and made Titular Bishop of Isauropolis as well as apostolic vicar of the Huế during the Indochina War.

He retired in 1960, near Our Lady of La Vang Sanctuary and was expelled from Vietnam in 1975 by the communists. He spent his last years in Montbeton, France, where he died in 1979, aged 77.
