= François David =

Chaldean Catholic bishop of Amadiyah (1870–1939)

- Eparch of Amadiya
- Native name: فرانسوا ديفيد
- Church: Chaldean Catholic Church
- Diocese: Eparchy of Amadiya
- In office: 24 February 1910 – 1 October 1939
- Predecessor: Jacques-Jean Sahhar
- Successor: Jean Kurio

Orders
- Ordination: 4 June 1893 by Eliya Abulyonan
- Consecration: 15 August 1910 by Yousef VI Emmanuel II Thomas

Personal details
- Born: 14 October 1870 Araden, Van vilayet, Ottoman Empire
- Died: 1 October 1939 (aged 68)

François David (Note: also Francis David or Francis Daoud (Arabic: فرانسوا ديفيد)) (14 October 1870 – 1 October 1939) was an ethnic Assyrian who served as the Chaldean Catholic Bishop of Amadiya in modern-day Iraq.

== Biography ==
David was born in Araden in 1870. He was ordained as a priest in the Chaldean Catholic Church in 1893. He was consecrated as bishop by Chaldean Patriarch Yousef VI Emmanuel II Thomas, who appointed him as the bishop of the Chaldean Catholic Eparchy of Amadiya in Kurdistan on 15 January 1910.

He became the principal consecrator of a French Archbishop of the Latin Church, Antonin Drapier, who later became Apostolic Delegate to French Indochina, and ordained some bishops there. The Chaldean lineage therefore includes a few members of the Latin episcopate in Vietnam.
