= Philippe Nguyễn Kim Điền =

Vietnamese Catholic prelate (1921–1988)

The Most Reverend Philippe Nguyễn Kim Điền PFJ
- Archbishop of Huế
- Native name: Philípphê Nguyễn Kim Điền
- Province: Huế
- See: Huế
- Appointed: 11 March 1968
- Term ended: 8 June 1988
- Predecessor: Pierre Martin Ngô Đình Thục
- Successor: Étienne Nguyễn Như Thể
- Previous posts: Apostolic Administrator of Huế & Titular Archbishop of Parium (1964-1968); Bishop of Cần Thơ (1960-1968)

Orders
- Ordination: 21 July 1947 by Marie Pierre Jean Cassaigne MEP
- Consecration: 11 January 1961 by Pierre Martin Ngô Đình Thục

Personal details
- Born: March 13, 1921 Long Đức, Trà Vinh province, Cochinchina, French Indochina
- Died: June 8, 1988 (aged 67) Ho Chi Minh City, Vietnam
- Buried: Phủ Cam Cathedral
- Motto: Omnia omnibus (All things to all men) (Nên mọi sự cho mọi người)

Philippe Nguyễn Kim Điền PFJ was a Vietnamese Catholic prelate who served as the second Archbishop of Huế from 1968 to 1988, during the country's period of late 20th-century wars and eventual reunification.

== Biography ==
Nguyễn Kim Điền was born on March 13, 1921, in Long Đức, Vietnam. After being ordained a priest in 1947 and serving as a professor and later rector of the seminary, he joined the Little Brothers of Jesus. After joining the order for sometime, Dien worked as a street cleaner and a rag picker in Saigon. He was appointed Bishop of Cần Thơ in 1960 at the recommendation of the previous bishop and his friend, Paul Nguyễn Văn Bình, who was appointed Archbishop of Saigon. He later became the Apostolic Administrator of Huế and Titular Archbishop of Pario in 1964 after the 1963 South Vietnamese coup d'état left Archbishop Pierre Martin Ngô Đình Thục unable to return from the Second Vatican Council in Rome. He ultimately succeeded Thục after being appointed Archbishop of Huế in 1968. He served as a Council Father during the Second Vatican Council on sessions one though four.

During his tenure as archbishop, he kept the Roman Catholic community together facing government efforts to control the church after Vietnam's reunification. He kept the local community strong amid seminary closures and the forced “reeducation” of many priests. The Vietnamese government formed the “Committee for the Solidarity of Patriotic Vietnamese Catholics” in 1983, attempting to separate the Vietnamese Roman Catholic church from Rome's papal authority. Điền was opposed to this committee and was placed under house arrest in 1984 until his death in 1988. During his house arrest, he continued to circulate letters among parishioners “and the authorities apparently made no serious attempt to replace him”. Priests and nuns were reported to have been arrested for distributing his statements clandestinely in Vietnam. These were also smuggled abroad. Điền was highly regarded in Vietnam. He was never a fervent anti-communist; he was a "priest of the people" who embraced the social reforms that came as a result of Vatican II. He was, however, critical of the government's policies and denounced the restrictions on Mass and other religious ceremonies, the anti-Catholic message children received in school, and the fact that Catholics were discriminated against when seeking employment. At one point during his tenure, he was placed under surveillance and two priests under his authority were arrested.

Being under house arrest prevented him from attending the 1986 Vatican Congregation for the Evangelization of Peoples; this prohibition would merit a formal protest from cardinals and bishops from 40 countries. Điền died of an illness in hospital in Ho Chi Minh City on June 8, 1988.

His tomb is located to the left inside the Phủ Cam Cathedral in Huế.

Điền was a priest for 40.8 years and a bishop for 27.3 years.
