= Antonin Drapier =

French Catholic archbishop (1891–1967)

Antonin-Fernand Drapier O.P.
- Delegate to Indochina
- Church: Catholic Church
- See: Apostolic Delegation to Indochina
- In office: 28 November 1936 – April 1950
- Predecessor: Victor Dreyer
- Successor: John Jarlath Dooley
- Other post: Titular Archbishop of Neocaesarea in Ponto (1929-1967)
- Previous post: Apostolic Delegate to Mesopotamia, Kurdistan, and Lesser Armenia (1929-1936)

Orders
- Ordination: 24 April 1924 by Charles-Albert-Joseph Lecomte
- Consecration: 22 December 1929 by François David

Personal details
- Born: 28 April 1891 Creuë (part of present-day Vigneulles-lès-Hattonchâtel), Meuse, France
- Died: 30 July 1967 (aged 76)

Ordination history of Antonin Drapier
History
Episcopal consecration
- Consecrated by: François David
- Date: 22 December 1929
Episcopal succession
Bishops consecrated by Antonin Drapier as principal consecrator
- Jean-Baptiste-Maximilien Chabalier: 24 February 1938
- Pierre Martin Ngô Đình Thục: 4 May 1938
- Felix Hedde: 30 November 1939
- Jean Marie Phan Đình Phùng: 3 December 1940
- Jean Cassaigne: 24 June 1941
- Jean-Liévin-Joseph Sion: 22 April 1942
- Santos Ubierna: 21 September 1942
- Raymond-Marie-Marcel Piquet: 18 January 1944
- Jean-Baptiste Urrutia: 27 May 1948
- Étienne-Auguste-Germain Loosdregt: 30 June 1952

Antonin-Fernand Drapier (28 April 1891 – 30 July 1967) was a French prelate of the Catholic Church who worked in the diplomatic service of the Holy See.

He was born on 28 April 1891 in Creuë-en-Woëvre, France. He was ordained priest of the Dominican Order on 24 April 1924.

He was named titular archbishop of Neocesarea di Ponto and Apostolic Delegate to Mesopotamia, Kurdistan, and Lesser Armenia on 7 October 1929. He received his episcopal consecration on 22 December 1929 from François David, Bishop of the Chaldean Catholic Eparchy of Amadiya.

He was appointed Apostolic Delegate to Indochina on 28 November 1936.

He retired in 1950 and died on 30 July 1967.

Being consecrated by a Chaldean bishop, he was one of very few Roman Catholic bishop who couldn't trace their episcopal lineage to cardinal Scipione Rebiba or other Roman Catholic episcopal lineages but to an Eastern one. During his service in Indochina he consecrated a few local bishops and as of 2025 there are 9 Roman Catholic bishops in the Chaldean episcopal lineage (mostly in Vietnam).
