= Ngô Đình Thục =

Vietnamese Catholic prelate (1897–1984)

The Most Reverend Ngô Đình Thục
- Archbishop of Huế
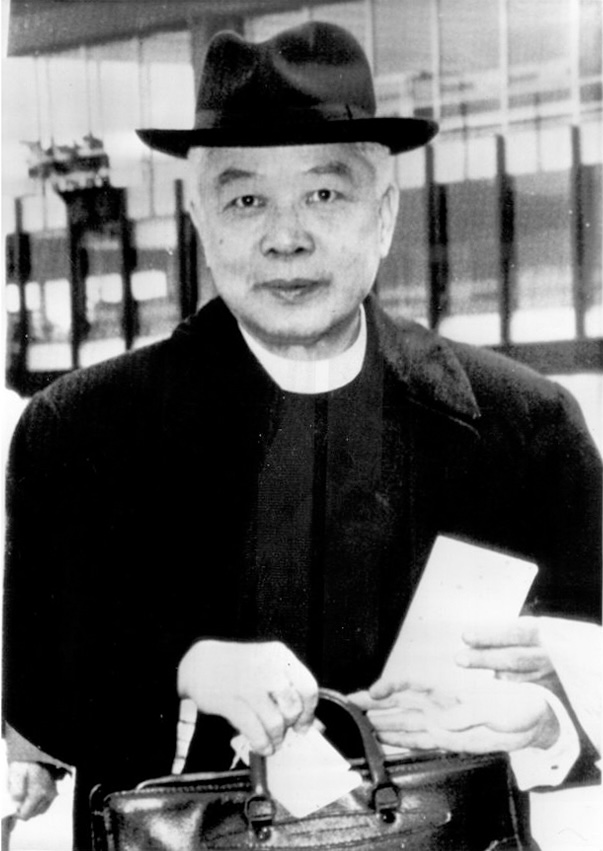
- Thục in 1963
- Native name: Phêrô Máctinô Ngô Đình Thục
- Archdiocese: Huế
- Province: Huế
- Appointed: 24 November 1960
- Installed: 12 April 1961
- Term ended: 17 February 1968
- Predecessor: Jean-Baptiste Urrutia MEP (as Vicar Apostolic)
- Successor: Philippe Nguyễn Kim Điền PFI
- Other post: Titular Archbishop of Bulla Regia (1968–1984)
- Previous posts: Vicar Apostolic of Vĩnh Long (1938–1960); Titular Bishop of Saesina (1938–1960)

Orders
- Ordination: 20 December 1925 by Eugène-Marie-Joseph Allys MEP
- Consecration: 4 May 1938 by Antonin Drapier OP

Personal details
- Born: 6 October 1897 Huế, Annam, French Indochina
- Died: 13 December 1984 (aged 87) Carthage, Missouri, US
- Buried: Park Cemetery, Carthage, Missouri (present); Resurrection Cemetery, Springfield, Missouri (formerly)
- Denomination: Catholic Church
- Parents: Ngô Đình Khả
- Education: Philosophy, theology, Catholic canon law
- Alma mater: Pontifical Gregorian University
- Motto: Miles Christi (Soldier of Christ) (Chiến sĩ Chúa Kitô)
- Signature: Ngô Đình Thục's signature

Ordination history
History
Priestly ordination
- Ordained by: Eugène-Marie-Joseph Allys MEP
- Date: 20 December 1925
Episcopal consecration
- Principal consecrator: Antonin Drapier OP
- Co-consecrators: Isidore-Marie-Joseph Dumortier MEP, Dominique Maria Hồ Ngọc Cẩn
- Date: 4 May 1938
Episcopal succession
Bishops consecrated by Ngô Đình Thục as principal consecrator
- Simon Hòa Nguyễn Văn Hiền: 30 November 1955
- Paul Nguyễn Văn Bình: 30 November 1955
- Philippe Nguyễn Kim Điền PFI: 22 January 1961
- Michel Nguyễn Khắc Ngư: 22 January 1961
- Antoine Nguyễn Văn Thiện: 22 January 1961
- Joseph Trãn Vãn Thiên: 22 January 1961
- Clemente Domínguez y Gómez: 11 January 1976
- Manuel Corral: 11 January 1976
- Camilo Estévez: 11 January 1976
- Michael Donnelly: 11 January 1976
- Francis Sandler: 11 January 1976
- Michel-Louis Guérard des Lauriers: 7 May 1981
- Moisés Carmona: 17 October 1981
- Adolfo Zamora: 17 October 1981
- Christian Marie Datessen: 25 September 1982
- Styles
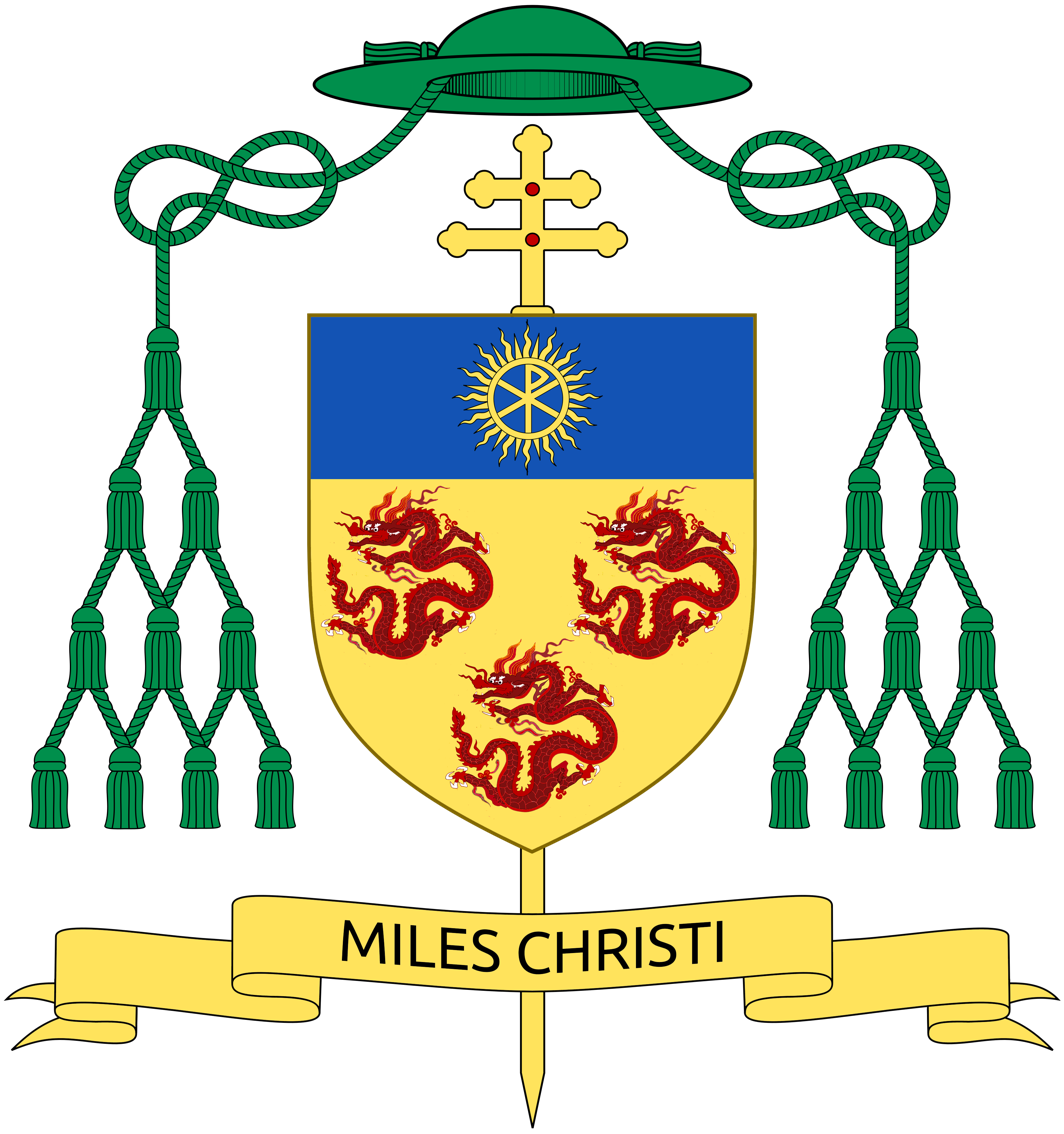
- Reference style: His Excellency; The Most Reverend
- Spoken style: Your Excellency
- Religious style: Your Excellency

Pierre Martin Ngô Đình Thục (Vietnamese pronunciation: [ŋo ɗîŋ̟ tʰùk]) (6 October 1897 – 13 December 1984) was a Vietnamese Catholic prelate who served as the first Archbishop of Huế in the Republic of Vietnam from 1960 until 1968. He later lived in exile in Europe due to the unrest in his country and became a sedevacantist, consequently excommunicated twice by the Catholic Church. Five months before he died, he repented of his views and was reconciled with the Church.

He was a member of the Ngô family who ruled South Vietnam before and during the early years of the Vietnam War and was the founder of Dalat University. While Thục was in Rome attending the second session of the Second Vatican Council, the 1963 South Vietnamese coup overthrew and assassinated his younger brothers, Ngô Đình Diệm (who was president of South Vietnam) and Ngô Đình Nhu. Thục was unable to return to Vietnam and lived the rest of his life exiled in Italy, France, and the United States. During his exile, he was involved with Traditionalist Catholic movements and consecrated a number of bishops without the Vatican's approval for the Palmarian and sedevacantist groups. Today, various Independent Catholic and sedevacantist groups claim to have derived their apostolic succession from Thục.

== Biography ==
=== Early life and family ===
Thục was born on 6 October 1897, in Huế, French Indochina, to an affluent Roman Catholic family as the second of the six surviving sons born to Ngô Đình Khả, a mandarin of the Nguyễn dynasty who served Emperor Thành Thái during the French occupation of Vietnam.

Thục's elder brother, Khôi, served as a governor and mandarin of the French-controlled Emperor Bảo Đại's administration. At the end of World War Two, both Khôi and Thục's younger brother Diệm were arrested for having collaborated with the Japanese. Diệm was released, but Khôi was subsequently shot by the Việt Minh as part of the August Revolution of 1945 (and not buried alive as is sometimes stated). Thục's brothers Diệm, Nhu and Cẩn, were politically active. Cardinal François Xavier Nguyễn Văn Thuận (1928–2002) was Thục's nephew.

=== Priesthood and early episcopacy ===
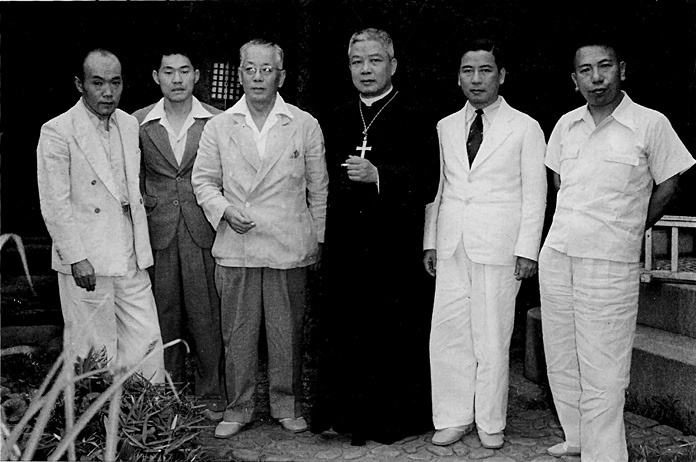
Ngo Dinh Diem (second from right) and Bishop Ngo Dinh Thuc (third from right) in Japan, August 28, 1950

At age twelve, Thục entered the minor seminary in An Ninh. He spent eight years there before going on to study philosophy at the major seminary in Huế. Following his ordination as a priest on 20 December 1925, he was selected to study theology in Rome, and is often said to have earned three doctorates from the Pontifical Gregorian University in philosophy, theology, and canon law; this is not substantiated by the university's archives however. He briefly lectured at the Sorbonne and gained teaching qualifications before returning to Vietnam in 1927.

On 8 January 1938, Pope Pius XI created the Apostolic Vicariate of Vĩnh Long in Vietnam and personally chose Thục (then aged 41) to be it its first vicar apostolic. On 4 May of the same year, with his family in attendance, Thục was consecrated a bishop by Archbishop Antonin Drapier, Apostolic Delegate to Indochina, and co-consecrators Bishop Isidore-Marie-Joseph Dumortier, M.E.P., Vicar Apostolic of Saigon, and Bishop Dominique Maria Hồ Ngọc Cẩn, Vicar Apostolic of Bùi Chu.

In 1950, Diệm and Thục applied for permission to travel to Rome for the Holy Year celebrations at the Vatican but went instead to Japan to lobby Prince Cường Để to enlist support to seize power. They met Wesley Fishel, an American academic consultant for the U.S. government. Fishel was a proponent of the anti-colonial, anti-communist third force doctrine in Asia and was impressed by Diệm. He helped the brothers organise contacts and meetings in the United States to enlist support.

With the outbreak of the Korean War and the onset of McCarthyism in the early 1950s, Vietnamese anti-communists were a sought-after commodity in the United States. Diệm and Thục were given a reception at the State Department with the Acting Secretary of State James Webb, where Thục did much of the talking. Diệm and Thục also forged links with Cardinal Francis Spellman, the most politically influential American cleric of his time, and Spellman became one of Diệm's most powerful advocates. Diệm then managed an audience with Pope Pius XII in Rome with his brother's help, and then settled in the US as a guest of the Maryknoll Fathers. Spellman helped Diệm to garner support among right-wing and Catholic circles. Thục was widely seen as more genial, loquacious, and diplomatic than his brother, and it was acknowledged that Thục would be highly influential in the future regime. As French power in Vietnam declined, Diệm's support in America, which Thục helped to nurture, made his stock rise. Emperor Bảo Đại made Diệm the prime minister of the State of Vietnam because he thought Diệm's connections would secure foreign financial aid.

=== Diệm's rule ===
In October 1955, Diệm deposed Bảo Đại in a fraudulent referendum organised by Nhu and declared himself President of the newly proclaimed Republic of Vietnam, which then concentrated power in the Ngô family, who were dedicated Roman Catholics in a Buddhist majority country. Power was enforced through secret police and the imprisonment and torture of political and religious opponents. The Ngôs' policies and conduct inflamed religious tensions. The government was biased towards Catholics in public service and military promotions, as well as the allocation of land, business favors and tax concessions. Thục, the most powerful religious leader in the country, was allowed to solicit "voluntary contributions to the Church" from Saigon businessmen, which was likened to "tax notices". Thục also used his position to acquire farms, businesses, urban real estate, rental property and rubber plantations for the Catholic Church. He also used Army of the Republic of Vietnam personnel to work on his timber and construction projects.

On 24 November 1960, Thục was appointed Archbishop of Huế by Pope John XXIII.

=== Buddhist unrest and downfall of Diệm ===
In May 1963, in the central city of Huế, Buddhists were prohibited from displaying the Buddhist flag during Vesak celebrations commemorating the birth of Gautama Buddha, when the government cited a regulation prohibiting the display of non-government flags at Thục's request. A few days earlier, Catholics were encouraged to fly flags to celebrate Thục's 25th anniversary as bishop, but were ordered by Diem's government to fly Vietnamese flags as more important. Government funds were used to pay for Thục's anniversary celebrations, and the residents of Huế—a Buddhist stronghold—were also forced to contribute. These perceived double standards led to a Buddhist protest against the government. Buddhist leader Thích Trí Quang proclaimed a five-point "manifesto of the monks" that demanded freedom to fly the Buddhist flag, religious equality between Buddhists and Catholics, compensation for the victims' families, an end to arbitrary arrests, and punishment of the officials responsible. The protest ended when nine civilians were killed by a bomb blast which Diệm blamed on the Viet Cong. American journalists, who supported American intervention in Vietnam and opposed Diem for opposing it, blamed the military and even Archbishop Thuc for the deaths. Later, the Ngôs' forces entered the Buddhist pagodas across the country. The synchronized military operations, the speed at which banners were erected declaring the ARVN resolve to defeat communism, and doctored propaganda photos purporting to show Viet Cong infiltration of the Buddhists suggested that the actions were long premeditated. In an attempt to maintain secrecy, special printing presses had produced propaganda materials only hours before the raids.

Diệm was overthrown and assassinated together with Nhu on 2 November 1963. Ngô Đình Cẩn was sentenced to death and executed in 1964. Of the six brothers, only Thục and Luyện survived the political upheavals in Vietnam. Luyện, the youngest, was serving as ambassador in London, and Thục had been summoned to Rome for the Second Vatican Council. Because of the coup, Thục remained in Rome during the Council years (1962–65). He was among the bishops who were against the statements of the council.

=== Exile in Rome ===
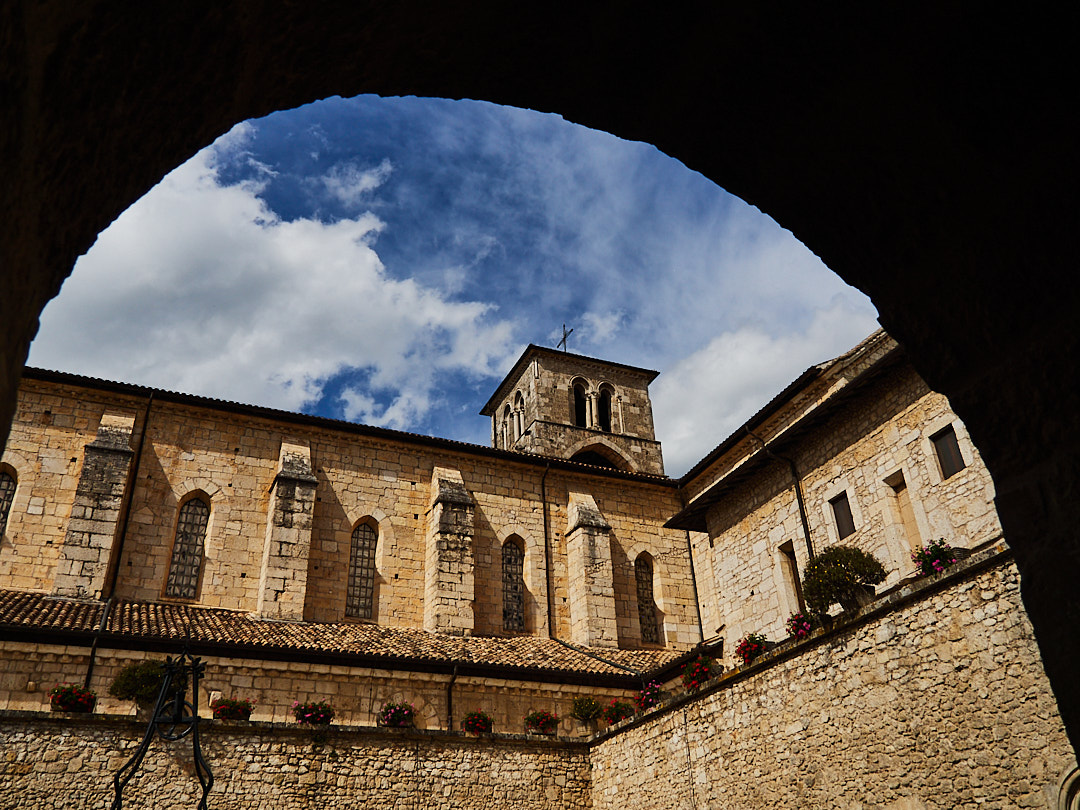
The Cistercian Casamari Abbey in the Province of Frosinone, close to Rome. Archbishop Thục lived here for some time during his Italian exile.

After the closing of the Second Vatican Council, none of the relevant governments – American, Vietnamese or the Vatican – consented to Thục returning to Vietnam. Thus, he began his exile in Rome. He moved lodgings several times while here; from a Roman parish, to the Cistercian Casamari Abbey and then to the town of Arpino, close to Rome.

According to Thục, the Americans forced the South Vietnamese government to refuse him permission to return, and that Paul VI used this inability to return to force him to resign and appoint Bishop Philippe Nguyễn Kim Điền, one of Paul VI's favorites, as his replacement. Aside from this leaving him estranged from his homeland, the fall of the Ngô family also saw him cut off from income streams he previously had access to, leaving him with only what he had brought to Rome and donations from Vietnamese congregants to keep him from destitution.

Despite claims later made by Thục, there is no evidence that he was among the traditionalist voices at the time the Second Vatican Council had been in session. Nevertheless, with his own personal discontent building by the late 1960s during his exile, he noticed others who had grown discontented with the liberalizing changes in the Catholic world following on from the Council: the traditionalist Catholics. This pushback was most notably exemplified by the figure of Archbishop Marcel Lefebvre and his Society of St. Pius X. In 1974, with the controversy over this issue growing and becoming more trenchant, Archbishop Thục traveled to the International Seminary of Saint Pius X in Écône, Switzerland to give a speech, visiting the SSPX and recasting himself as an ardent traditionalist.

=== Consecrations of bishops and declaration of sedevacantism ===
A Swiss priest Thục formerly knew in Écône, Switzerland, Father Maurice Revaz, former Chancellor of the Swiss Diocese of Sion and professor of canon law in Ecône at the International Seminary of Saint Pius X of the traditionalist Society of Saint Pius X (SSPX), came to Thục and invited him to go to Spain, saying that the Blessed Virgin Mary wanted him to render her a service. On 1 January 1976, in El Palmar de Troya, Spain, Thục ordained Clemente Domínguez y Gómez — who claimed to have repeatedly witnessed apparitions of the Blessed Virgin Mary — and others as priests for the Carmelites of the Holy Face (later the Palmarian Catholic Church), and on 11 January 1976, consecrated Dominguez and four others as bishops. When news of the illicit consecrations became public, Thục, Domínguez and all other consecrated bishops were excommunicated by Pope Paul VI on 17 September 1976. Thục stated that he had gone to Palmar de Troya on the spur of the moment, though contemporary sources show him to have been a regular visitor since 1968. Later, Thuc was pardoned and readmitted to the Church.

On 7 May 1981, Thục purported to consecrate another priest Michel-Louis Guérard des Lauriers as a bishop. On 17 October, Thục also purported to consecrate two Mexican sedevacantist priests and former seminary professors Moisés Carmona and Adolfo Zamora as bishops. Carmona and Zamora were among the priests who formed the Unión Católica Trento (Tridentine Catholic Union).

On 21 March, Laetare Sunday, he publicly proclaimed this declaration during a Pontifical High Mass in Sankt Michael Church in Munich.

In response to these purported consecrations and his declaration of sedevacantism, the Congregation for the Doctrine of the Faith again declared him ipso facto excommunicated on 8 April 1983.

In 1982, Thuc declared:

in so far as I am a bishop of the Roman Catholic Church, I judge that the Chair of the Roman Catholic Church is vacant; and it behooves me, as bishop, to do all that is needed so that the Roman Catholic Church will endure in its mission for the salvation of souls.

Thuc's contemporaries were shocked by his actions and suggested they were due to mental illness or dementia.

In 1983, Thục departed for the United States at the invitation of Louis Vezelis, an American Franciscan former priest who later became a sedevacantist bishop. Thục collaborated with Vezelis in the operation of a seminary in Rochester, New York, United States.

=== Reconciliation and death ===
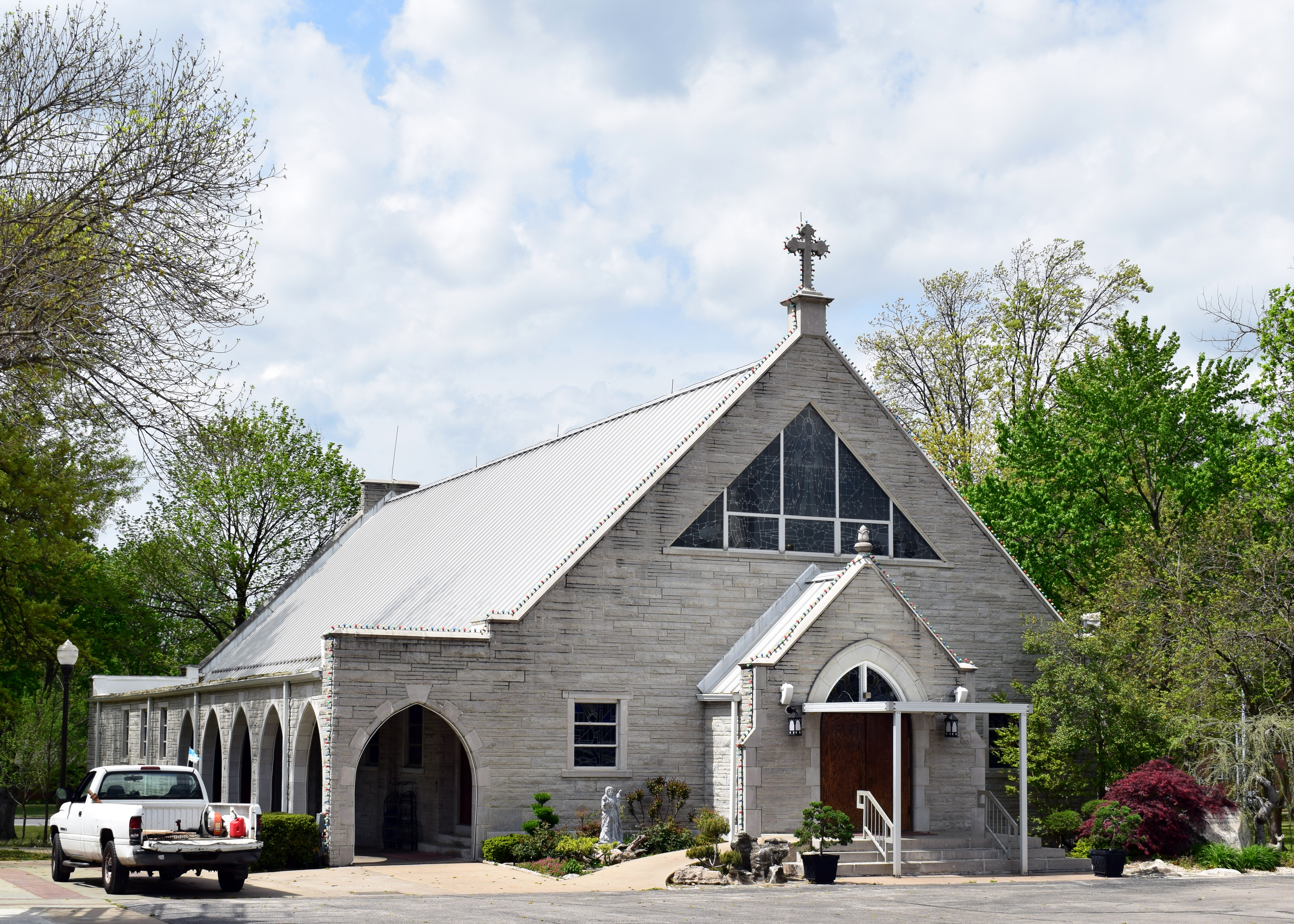
Shrine of the Immaculate Heart of Mary on the campus of the Congregation of the Mother Co-Redemptrix, (now Congregation of the Mother of the Redeemer) in Carthage, Missouri.

Thục began to be increasingly sought out by the expatriate and refugee Vietnamese community, including old friends and contacts from Huế and Saigon. They facilitated his extraction from sedevacantism and Thục returned to the Catholic Church on 11 July 1984, after asking forgiveness from the Church and recanting his views. He later came to stay with the Congregation of the Mother Co-Redemptrix in Carthage, Missouri and later celebrated a Mass during the Marian Days.

Thục died on 13 December 1984, at the age of 87, only a few months after being received back into the Church. He was buried in the Resurrection Cemetery in Springfield, Missouri.

== See also ==
- Roman Catholicism in Vietnam
