= François Sully =

French journalist (1927–1971)

- Sully in 1965
- Born: 27 August 1927; Paris, France
- Died: 24 February 1971 (aged 43); Long Bình, South Vietnam
- Occupation: Journalist

Note: The "François Sully" credited in The Foreman Went to France (1942) was British character actor Francis L. Sullivan.

François Sully (1927–1971) was a French journalist and photographer best known for his work during the Vietnam War. Sully was one of the earliest journalists to cover the Vietnam War and spent 24 years in Indochina. At the time of his death in a command helicopter crash near the Cambodian border, he was viewed as the dean of the Saigon press corps.

== Life ==
Sully was born on 27 August 1927 in France and fought against the Nazis in the French Resistance as a teenager and was wounded on his seventeenth birthday in Paris. After the liberation of Paris he enlisted in the French Army, fought the Nazis in Germany and then volunteered for the French Expeditionary Forces, arriving in Saigon when the Japanese surrendered in 1945. Discharged in Saigon, Sully tried his hand as a tea planter and rancher before turning to journalism. In 1947 he joined Asie du Sud-Est, a now defunct French magazine, working for them until 1953. He was assigned to cover the battle of Dien Bien Phu by Time-Life. He escaped from behind the Viet Minh lines. In 1959 he joined United Press International (UPI). He wrote articles for Time magazine and his photographs were carried by Black Star until he joined Newsweek in early 1961.

In March 1962, Sully was to be expelled from South Vietnam by President Ngo Dinh Diem, egged on by Madame Nhu, as his reporting was deemed "helpful to the enemy". Unofficially, Diem intended the expulsion to serve as a warning to all journalists reporting the failings of his U.S.-assisted war against the Viet Cong. The other journalist on the expulsion list was Homer Bigart of the New York Times. Diem backed down after the U.S. Mission explained that expulsion would only worsen an already bad relationship with the press. Five months later, however, in August 1962, Sully was sent packing after some seventeen years in Indochina. The Newsweek issue of 20 August 1962 carried a long article by Sully "Viet Nam: The Unpleasant Truth". His expulsion became a major political affair between Saigon and Washington. Sully departed Saigon on 9 September, with most of the press corps at the airfield in a show of solidarity. After his expulsion Sully proceeded to Harvard where he put in a year at the Nieman Foundation and worked in bordering countries to Vietnam. He returned to the Newsweek bureau in Saigon after the November 1963 Coup and assassination of Ngo Dinh Diem.

During his work as Newsweek's Saigon Bureau Chief, Sully also wrote for a number of other newsmagazines including The Nation and The New Republic. In 1967 and 1968, Sully wrote articles for McGraw-Hill's business-reporting service World News which distributed them to Business Week, Medical World News, Engineering News Record, and other publications. In addition to writing news stories and taking photographs, Sully wrote Age of the Guerrilla: The New Warfare (New York: Parent's Magazine Press, 1968; reprinted by Avon, 1970) and compiled and edited We the Vietnamese: Voices from Vietnam (New York: Praeger, 1971).

Sully was the insider's insider amongst the press corps in Vietnam. His sources were numerous inside the Viet Minh and Viet Cong, inside the Palace in Saigon and at grassroots levels in every province in the North and South. He spoke several languages and was fluent in French, English, Vietnamese and Lao.

Sully died in late February 1971. On 23 February 1971 he was aboard the command helicopter of General Do Cao Tri (the 'Patton of the Parrots Beak') as it was on its way to the area bordering Cambodia. The helicopter had lifted off from Trang Lon Tay Ninh airstrip and was heading towards a firebase just across the Vietnam-Cambodia border. As the helicopter was taking off reaching approximately 80 feet its engine exhaust spewing out flames. 80 feet (24 m) Helicopter Pilots on the ground recognized it as a FOD (foreign object damage) accident. The helicopter turned left and crashed on its left skid then turned over. Immediately a metallic fire engulfed the aircraft as the fire was fed with JP4 jet fuel. Sully alone was ejected to the ground about 20 feet from the fire, all others died in the crash.

Sully died from injuries suffered in the fall at Long Binh Military field hospital. Sully was buried in Mac Dinh Chi Cemetery in Saigon. He left his insurance policy of 18 million piasters (equivalent to $45,000 at February 1971 exchange rates) to Vietnamese orphans.

== See also ==
- List of journalists killed and missing in the Vietnam War

== References and further reading ==
- Grant, Zalin. Facing the Phoenix: The CIA and the Political Defeat of the United States in Vietnam. W. W. Norton & Co., 1991. ISBN 978-0-393-02925-3
- "François Sully". Newsweek, 17 September 1962, p. 68
- "François Sully". Newsweek, 8 March 1971, p. 75
- Moir, Nathaniel L. (2023). "To Each His Turn ... Today Yours, Tomorrow Mine: François Sully's Turn in History". The Journal of American-East Asian Relations. 30 (3). Brill: 274–309. doi:10.1163/18765610-30030005.
