= Family Health (disambiguation) =

Family Health may refer to:

- Family medicine
- Family Health (magazine), an American health magazine
- Family Health International renamed FHI 360, nonprofit human development organization based in North Carolina

== See also ==
- Family Health Care Decisions Act
