= Mai Phương =

Vietnamese actress (1985–2020)

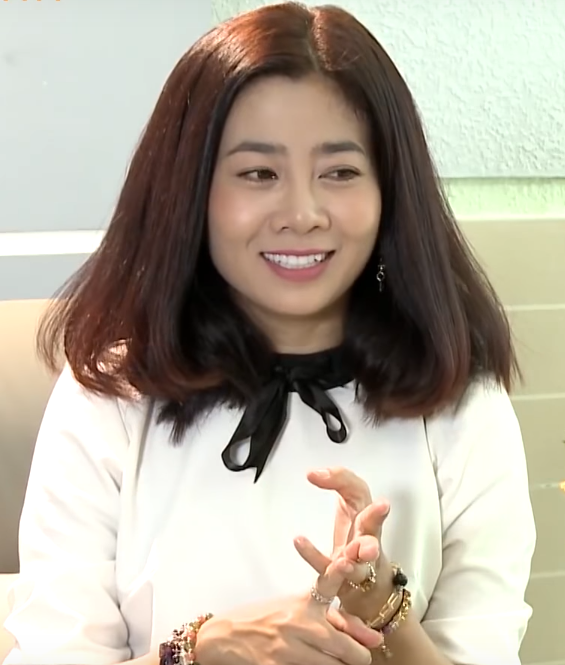
- Mai Phương in 2019
- Born: 14 January 1985; Haiphong, Vietnam
- Died: 28 March 2020 (aged 35); Ho Chi Minh City, Vietnam
- Education: Ho Chi Minh City College of Stage Performance and Cinematics
- Occupation: Actress
- Years active: 2005–2019

Phan Thị Mai Phương (14 January 1985 – 28 March 2020) was a Vietnamese actress. She starred in Trai nhảy as Hồng (2007), Cuộc phiêu lưu của Hai Lúa (2009) as Sáu Nhú, and Những thiên thần áo trắng (2010) as Mai, and in 2019 she was part of the second season of the reality show Ký ức vui vẻ.

== Biography ==
Phan Thị Mai Phương was born on 14 January 1985. She was educated at the Faculty of Drama, Ho Chi Minh City College of Stage Performance and Cinematics, graduated in 2006. After becoming part of the Phu Nhuan Drama Stage troupe, she started work as a stage actor, before transitioning to television acting.

In 2005, Mai Phương starred as Hồng in Nguyễn Mỹ Khanh's film series Xóm Cào Cào. In 2007, she starred in Trai nhảy as Đậu; Ân Nguyễn of VnExpress called it "a highlight in Mai Phương's career", and she still was known by the nickname "bé Đậu" due to her role in the movie. She later starred in the TV series Cuộc phiêu lưu của Hai Lúa (2009) as Sáu Nhú and Những thiên thần áo trắng (2010) as Mai, respectively. She also appeared in Hương phù sa, Mộng phù du, Một ngày không có em, and Sóng đời. M. Khuê of Người Lao Động called her "a notable name in the Vietnamese entertainment industry at that time".

In August 2013, Mai Phương gave birth to a daughter, whom she raised her as a single mother after her boyfriend, singer Phùng Ngọc Huy (she did not disclose whom the father was), emigrated to the United States, and she subsequently retired temporarily from entertainment activities. She appeared in Những bà mẹ bỉm sữa (2018), a sitcom which Mai Phương said was similar to her in personality. In 2019, she accepted a role in the web drama Thần chết tập sự, which filmed in Ho Chi Minh City, in order to be closer to her daughter.

In August 2018, following symptoms of coughing and pain, Mai Phương was diagnosed with terminal lung cancer, and she stayed at Military Hospital 175 for treatment, before being discharged on 10 September. She therefore reduced her work in entertainment due to her illness, including declining an invitation to the first season of Ký ức vui vẻ.

In 2019, Mai Phương appeared in the second season of Ký ức vui vẻ as part of the 1990s team led by actress Ốc Thanh Vân, a long-time close friend of hers who had visited her at the hospital during her medical treatment and prior to her death. She was also cast by Hồ Ngọc Xum in a starring role in his 2019 television series Con ông Hai Lúa; according to fellow actor Thanh Nam, she had to drive at least fifty kilometers to work on the series.

Following another hospitalization at Hospital 175 in September 2019, Mai Phương died in her home on 28 March 2020 from cancer; she was 35. Her funeral took place on the next day, 29 March 2020, at Nguyễn Tri Phương Hospital's Funeral hall in District 5 as a Protestant one per her wishes and. Due to the COVID-19 pandemic in Vietnam, the funeral was kept private and had few guests, she was subsequently cremated at Bình Hưng Hòa Cemetery on 31 March.
