= Maxwell M. Geffen =

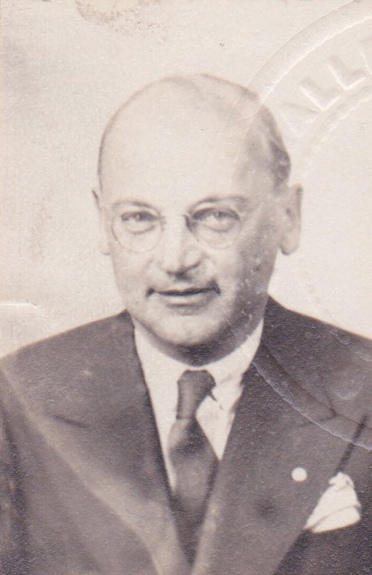
- Maxwell M. Geffen in 1941
- Born: May 28, 1896; Brooklyn, New York
- Died: October 11, 1980 (aged 84); Manhasset, New York
- Occupation: American publisher

Maxwell M. Geffen (May 28, 1896 – October 11, 1980) was an American publisher.

== Life and career ==
Geffen graduated from the Columbia University School of Journalism in 1916. He then worked as a correspondent for The New York American newspaper. From 1922 to 1941 he was the publisher of New York Medical Week, the official publication of the New York County Medical Society. From 1938 until 1957 he and Victor Knauth edited Omnibook Magazine, which published abridged versions of current best-sellers. Geffen was also one of the founders of the Blue List, a daily paper that consisted entirely of advertising for municipal bonds that was later merged into Standard & Poor's, which was in turn acquired by McGraw-Hill. He also founded a magazine for doctors, Medical World News, in 1961 and sold it to McGraw-Hill in 1966 for $17 million.

In 1968, at the age of 72, he resigned as a senior vice president at McGraw-Hill and became the principal owner and chairman of the publisher David McKay, Ltd. In the same year, he started another magazine, Family Health, which was later renamed to Health.

== Personal life ==
He was the brother-in-law of the writer Matthew Josephson.

== Death ==
Geffen died Saturday, October 11, 1980, at North Shore University Hospital in Manhasset, New York.
