= Omnibook (magazine) =

American magazine featuring abridged books

Omnibook was a magazine published from 1938 until 1957 by Omnibook Inc. in New York. It was edited by Maxwell M. Geffen and Victor W. Knauth and featured "authorized abridgements of current best-selling books."
