= Ngo Dinh Diem =

President of South Vietnam from 1955 to 1963

President Ngô Đình Diệm
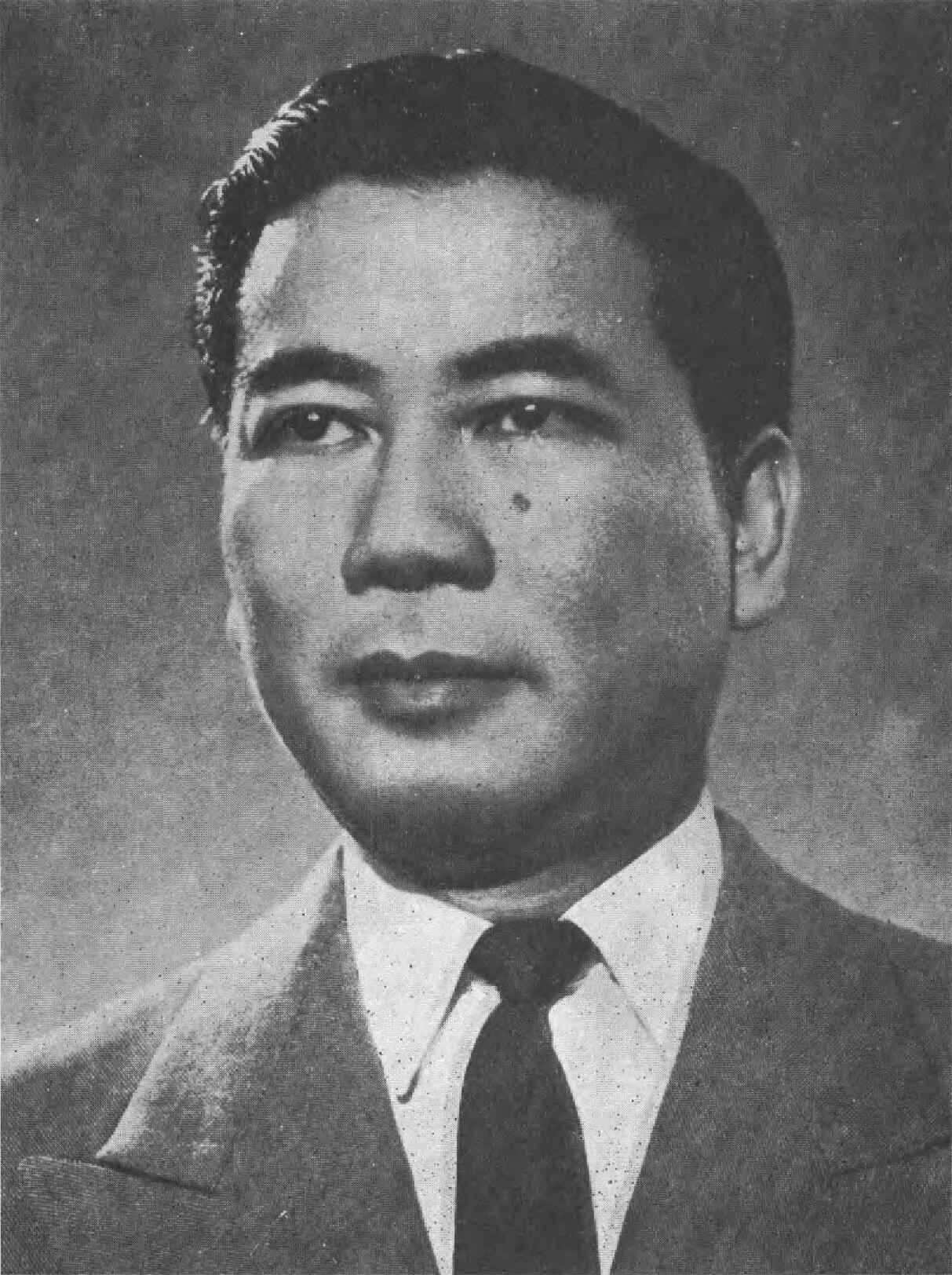
- Official portrait, 1956

1st President of South Vietnam
- In office 26 October 1955 – 2 November 1963
- Vice President: None (1955–1956); Nguyễn Ngọc Thơ (1956–1963)
- Preceded by: Position established Bảo Đại as Chief of the State of Vietnam
- Succeeded by: Nguyễn Văn Thiệu; Dương Văn Minh (as Chairman of the Military Revolutionary Council)

Minister of National Defense of South Vietnam
- In office 26 October 1955 – 2 November 1963
- President: Himself
- Preceded by: Position established
- Succeeded by: Trần Văn Đôn

Minister of National Defense of the State of Vietnam
- In office 6 July 1954 – 26 October 1955
- Prime Minister: Himself
- Preceded by: Phan Huy Quát
- Succeeded by: Position abolished

6th Prime Minister of the State of Vietnam 1st Prime Minister of South Vietnam
- In office 26 June 1954 – 26 October 1955
- Deputy: Nguyễn Văn Xuân (1954); Trần Chánh Thành (1954–1955)
- Head of State: Bảo Đại
- Preceded by: Prince Bửu Lộc
- Succeeded by: Position abolished

Minister of Personnel of the Nguyễn dynasty
- In office 8 April 1933 – 18 July 1933
- Monarch: Bảo Đại
- Preceded by: Nguyễn Hữu Bài
- Succeeded by: Thái Văn Toản

Personal details
- Born: 3 January 1901 Huế, Annam, French Indochina
- Died: 2 November 1963 (aged 62) Saigon, South Vietnam
- Cause of death: Assassination by shooting
- Resting place: Mạc Đĩnh Chi Cemetery (until 1983); Lái Thiêu Cemetery
- Party: Personalist Labor Revolutionary Party
- Other political affiliations: Dai Viet Renaissance Society
- Parent: Ngô Đình Khả (father)
- Relatives: Ngô Đình Khôi (brother); Ngô Đình Thục (brother); Ngô Đình Nhu (brother); Ngô Đình Cẩn (brother); Ngô Đình Luyện; (brother)
- Education: Huế Pellerin Seminary; National School College; Hau Bo School, Hanoi; Michigan State University

Military service
- Allegiance: South Vietnam
- Battles/wars: Vietnam War

Ngô Đình Diệm (Note: chữ Hán: 吴廷琰) (/djɛm/ dyem, /ˈjiːəm/ YEE-əm or /ziːm/ zeem; Vietnamese: [ŋō ɗìn jîəmˀ]; 3 January 1901 – 2 November 1963) was a South Vietnamese politician. He was the final prime minister of the State of Vietnam (1954–1955), and later the first president of South Vietnam (Republic of Vietnam) from 1955 until his capture and assassination during the CIA-backed 1963 coup d'état.

Diệm was born into a prominent Catholic family with his father, Ngô Đình Khả, being a high-ranking mandarin for Emperor Thành Thái during the French colonial era. Diệm was educated at French-speaking schools and considered following his brother Ngô Đình Thục into the priesthood, but eventually chose to pursue a career in the civil service. He progressed rapidly in the court of Emperor Bảo Đại, becoming governor of Bình Thuận Province in 1929 and interior minister in 1933. However, he resigned from the latter position after three months and publicly denounced the emperor as a tool of France. Diệm came to support Vietnamese nationalism, promoting both anti-communism, in opposition to Ho Chi Minh, and decolonization, in opposition to Bảo Đại. He established the Cần Lao Party to support his political doctrine of Person Dignity Theory, which was a blend of the philosophies of Personalism, especially as understood by French philosopher Emmanuel Mounier, and of Confucianism, which Diệm and his father had greatly admired. Diệm supported the Confucian concept of "Mandate of Heaven", and wished to make it the basis of political theory that would emerge in Vietnam.

After several years in exile in Japan, the United States, and Europe, Diệm returned home in July 1954 and was appointed prime minister by Bảo Đại. The 1954 Geneva Conference took place soon after he took office, formally partitioning Vietnam along the 17th parallel. Diệm, with the aid of his younger brother Ngô Đình Nhu, soon consolidated power in South Vietnam. After the 1955 State of Vietnam referendum, he proclaimed the creation of the Republic of Vietnam, with himself as president. His government was supported by other anti-communist countries, most notably the United States. Diệm pursued a series of nation-building projects, promoting industrial and rural development. From 1957 onward, as part of the Vietnam War, he faced several assassination and coup attempts, and a communist insurgency backed by North Vietnam. This insurgency eventually formally organized under the banner of the Viet Cong. In 1962, Diệm established the Strategic Hamlet Program as the cornerstone of his counterinsurgency effort.

In 1963, Diệm's favoritism towards Catholics and persecution of practitioners of Buddhism in Vietnam led to the Buddhist crisis. The event damaged relations with the United States and other previously sympathetic countries, and his organization lost favor with the leadership of the Army of the Republic of Vietnam. On 1 November 1963, the country's leading generals launched a coup d'état with assistance from the Central Intelligence Agency. Diệm and his brother, Nhu, initially escaped, but were recaptured the following day and assassinated on the orders of Dương Văn Minh, who succeeded him as president.

Diệm has been a controversial historical figure. Some have considered him a tool of the United States, while others have portrayed him as an anti-capitalist and traditionalist. At the time of his assassination, Western media widely considered him a dictator, though South Vietnamese offered a variety of views, generally acknowledging that he strongly opposed American interference.

== Family and early life ==
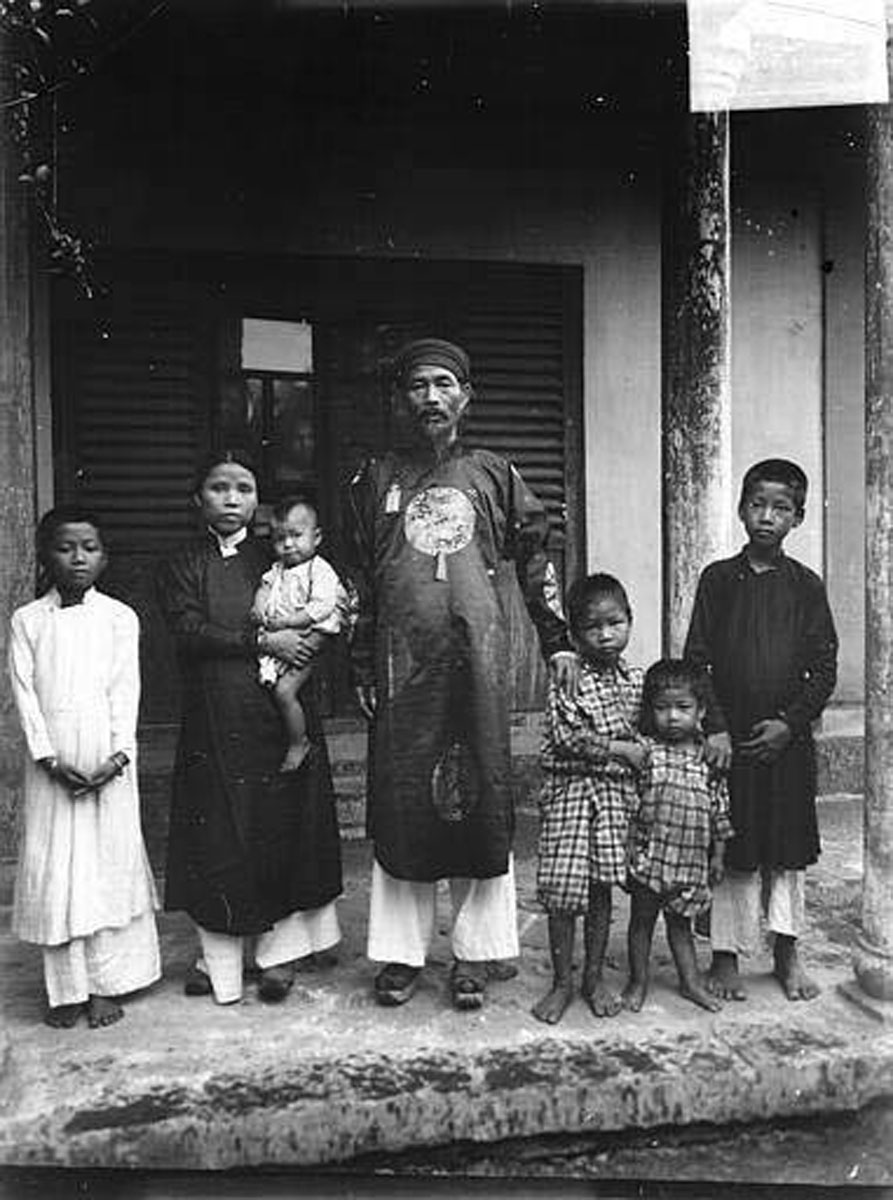
A photo of 4 year old Diệm (third from right) with his family in 1905 or 1906. His father Ngô Đình Khả stands in the centre.

Ngô Đình Diệm was born in 1901 in Huế, Annam, French Indochina, now in Central Vietnam. His family originated in Đại Phong, Lệ Thủy, Quảng Bình. His ancestors were said to be among Vietnam's earliest Catholic converts in the 17th century. Diệm was given a saint's name at birth, Gioan Baotixita (John the Baptist), following the custom of the Catholic Church. The Ngô-Đình family suffered under the anti-Catholic persecutions of Emperors Minh Mạng and Tự Đức. In 1880, while Diệm's father, Ngô Đình Khả (1850–1925), was studying in British Malaya, an anti-Catholic riot led by the Văn Thân almost wiped out the Ngô-Đình clan. Over 100 of the Ngô clan were "burned alive in a church including Khả's father, brothers, and sisters."

Ngô Đình Khả was educated in a Catholic school in British Malaya, where he learned English and studied the European-style curriculum. He was a devout Catholic and scrapped plans to become a Roman Catholic priest in the late 1870s. He worked for the commander of the French armed forces as an interpreter and took part in campaigns against anti-colonial rebels in the mountains of Tonkin during 1880. He rose to become a high-ranking mandarin, the first headmaster of the National Academy in Huế (founded in 1896), and a counsellor to Emperor Thành Thái. He was appointed minister of the rites and chamberlain and keeper of the eunuchs. Despite his collaboration with the French colonizers, Khả was "motivated less by Francophilia than by certain reformist ambitions". Like Phan Châu Trinh, Khả believed that independence from France could be achieved only after changes in Vietnamese politics, society, and culture had occurred. In 1907, after the ouster of emperor Thành Thái, Khả resigned his appointments, withdrew from the imperial court, and became a farmer in the countryside.

Khả decided to abandon his studies for the priesthood and instead married. After his first wife died childless, Khả remarried and, in a period of twenty-three years, had twelve children with his second wife, Phạm Thị Thân, nine of whom survived infancy – six sons and three daughters. As a devout Roman Catholic, Khả took his entire family to daily morning Mass and encouraged his sons to study for the priesthood. Having learned both Latin and classical Chinese, Khả strove to make sure his children were well educated in both Christian scriptures and Confucian classics. During his childhood, Diệm laboured in the family's rice fields while studying at a French Catholic primary school (Pellerin School) in Huế, and later entered a private school started by his father, where he studied French, Latin, and classical Chinese. At the age of fifteen he briefly followed his elder brother, Ngô Đình Thục, who would become Vietnam's highest-ranking Catholic bishop, into seminary. Diệm swore himself to celibacy to prove his devotion to his faith, but found monastic life too rigorous and decided not to pursue a clerical career. According to Mark Moyar, Diệm's personality was too independent to adhere to the disciplines of the Church, while Jarvis recalls Ngô Đình Thục's ironic observation that the Church was "too worldly" for Diệm. Diệm also inherited his father's antagonism toward the French colonialists who occupied his country.

At the end of his secondary schooling at Lycée Quốc học, the French lycée in Huế, Diem's outstanding examination results elicited the offer of a scholarship to study in Paris. He declined and, in 1918, enrolled at the prestigious School of Public Administration and Law in Hanoi, a French school that prepared young Vietnamese to serve in the colonial administration. It was there that he had the only romantic relationship of his life when he fell in love with one of his teacher's daughters. After his love interest chose to persist with her religious vocation and entered a convent, he remained celibate for the rest of his life. Diệm's family, educational, and religious values greatly influenced his life and career. Historian Edward Miller stated that Diệm "displayed Christian piety in everything from his devotional practices to his habit of inserting references to the Bible into his speeches"; he also enjoyed showing off his knowledge of classical Chinese texts.

== Early career ==
After graduating at the top of his class in 1921, Diệm followed in the footsteps of his eldest brother, Ngô Đình Khôi, joining the civil service in Thừa Thiên as a junior official. Starting from the lowest rank of mandarin, Diệm steadily rose over the next decade. He first served at the royal library in Huế, and within one year was the district chief in both Thừa Thiên and nearby Quảng Trị province, presiding over seventy villages. Diệm was promoted to be a provincial chief (Tuần phủ) in Ninh Thuận at the age of 28, overseeing 300 villages.

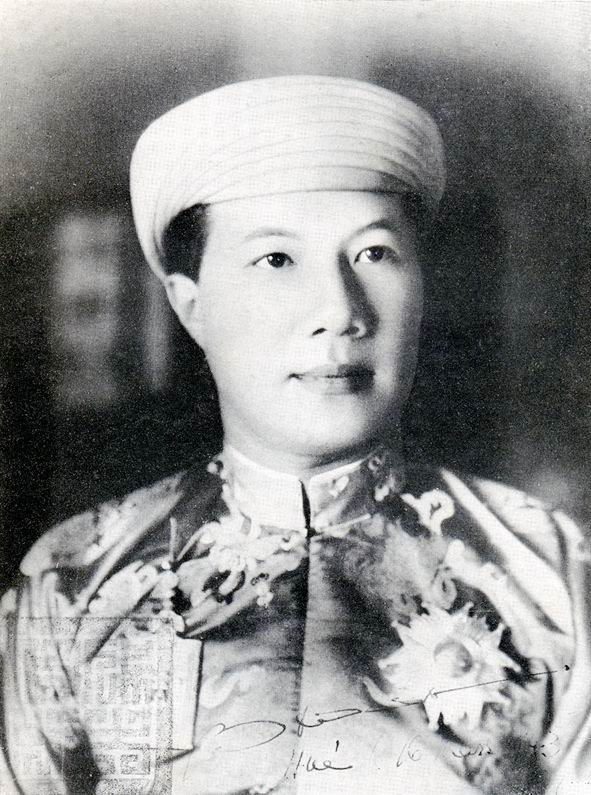
Portrait of emperor Bảo Đại

During his career as a mandarin, Diệm was known for his industriousness and incorruptibility, and as a Catholic leader and nationalist. Catholic nationalism in Vietnam during the 1920s and 1930s facilitated Diệm's ascent in his bureaucratic career.

Diệm's rise was also facilitated through his brother Ngô Đình Khôi's marriage to the daughter of Nguyễn Hữu Bài, who was the Catholic head of the Council of Ministers at the Huế court. Bài also supported the indigenization of the Vietnamese Church and giving more administrative powers to the monarchy. Bài was highly regarded among the French administration. Diệm's religious and family ties impressed Bài and he became Diệm's patron. The French were impressed by his work ethic but were irritated by Diệm's frequent calls to grant more autonomy to Vietnam. Diệm contemplated resigning but encouragement from the populace convinced him to persist. In 1925, he first encountered communists distributing propaganda while riding horseback through the region near Quảng Trị. Revolted by calls for violent socialist revolution contained in the propaganda leaflets, Diệm involved himself in anti-communist activities for the first time, spreading his own anti-communist pamphlets.

In 1929, he was promoted to the governorship of Bình Thuận Province and was known for his work ethic. In 1930 and 1931, he helped the French suppress the first peasant revolts organized by the communists. According to historian Bernard B. Fall Diệm put the revolts down as he believed they would not lead to the removal of the French but might threaten the leadership of the mandarins. In 1933, with the ascension of Bảo Đại to the throne, Diệm accepted Bảo Đại's invitation to be his interior minister following lobbying by Nguyễn Hữu Bài. Soon after his appointment, Diệm headed a commission to advise on potential administration reforms. After calling for the French administration to introduce a Vietnamese legislature and many other political reforms, he resigned after three months in office when his proposals were rejected. Diệm denounced Emperor Bảo Đại as "nothing but an instrument in the hands of the French administration", and renounced his decorations and titles from Bảo Đại. The French administration then threatened him with arrest and exile.

For the next decade, Diệm lived as a private citizen with his family in Huế, although he was kept under surveillance. He spent his time reading, meditating, attending church, gardening, hunting, and in amateur photography. Diệm also conducted extensive nationalist activities during those 21 years, engaging in meetings and correspondence with various leading Vietnamese revolutionaries, such as his friend, Phan Bội Châu, a Vietnamese anti-colonial activist, whom Diệm respected for his knowledge of Confucianism and argued that Confucianism's teachings could be applied to a modern Vietnam. With the start of the World War II in the Pacific, seeing an opportunity for Vietnam to challenge French colonization, he attempted to persuade the Japanese forces to declare independence for Vietnam in 1942 but was ignored. Diệm also tried to establish relationships with Japanese diplomats, army officers, and intelligence operatives who supported Vietnam's independence. In 1943, Diệm's Japanese friends helped him to contact Prince Cường Để, an anti-colonial activist, who was in exile in Japan.

After contacting Cường Để, Diệm formed a secret political party, the Association for the Restoration of Great Vietnam (Việt Nam Đại Việt Phục Hưng Hội), which was dominated by his Catholic allies in Huế. When its existence was discovered in the summer of 1944, the French declared Diệm to be subversive and ordered his arrest. He flew to Saigon under Japanese military protection, staying there until the end of WWII.

In 1945, after the coup against French colonial rule, the Japanese offered Diệm the post of prime minister in the Empire of Vietnam under Bảo Đại, which they organized on leaving the country. He declined initially, but reconsidered his decision and attempted to reverse the refusal. However, Bảo Đại had already given the post to Trần Trọng Kim. In September 1945, after the Japanese withdrawal, Ho Chi Minh proclaimed the Democratic Republic of Vietnam, and in the Northern half of Vietnam, his Viet Minh began fighting the French administration. Diệm attempted to travel to Huế to dissuade Bảo Đại from joining Hồ but was arrested by the Việt Minh along the way and exiled to a highland village near the border. He might have died of malaria, dysentery, and influenza had the local tribesmen not nursed him back to health. Six months later, he was taken to meet Hồ, who recognized Diệm's virtues and, wanting to extend the support for his new government, asked Diệm to be a minister of the interior. Diệm refused to join the Việt Minh, assailing Hồ for the murder of his brother Ngô Đình Khôi by Việt Minh cadres.

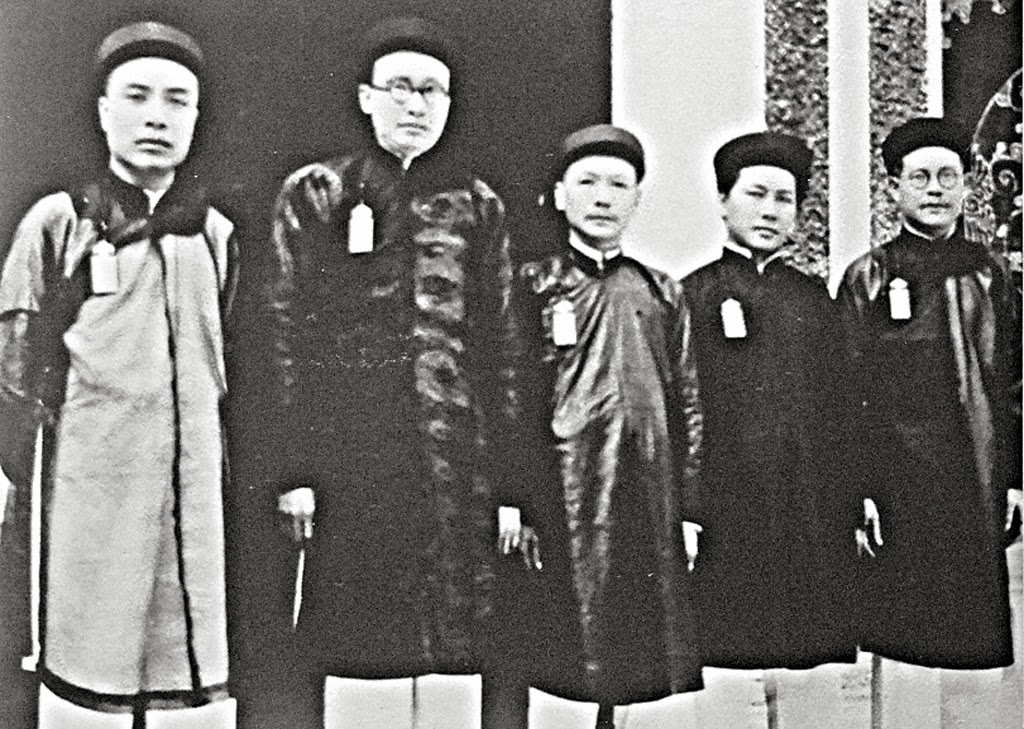
The five high-ranking mandarins (Thượng thư) of the Nguyễn dynasty during the reign of Emperor Bảo Đại (from left to right): Hồ Đắc Khải, Phạm Quỳnh, Thái Văn Toản, Ngô Đình Diệm, and Bùi Bằng Đoàn.

During the Indochina War, Diệm and other non-communist nationalists had to face a dilemma: they did not want to restore colonial rule and did not want to support the Việt Minh. As one of the most prominent attentistes, Diệm proclaimed his neutrality and attempted to establish a Third Force movement that was both anti-colonialist and anti-communist. In 1947, he became the founder and chief of the National Union Bloc (Khối Quốc Gia Liên Hiệp) and then folded it into the Vietnam National Rally (Việt Nam Quốc Gia Liên Hiệp), which united non-communist Vietnamese nationalists. He also established relationships with some leading Vietnamese anti-communists like Nguyễn Tôn Hoàn (1917–2001), a fellow Catholic and political activist. His other allies and advisors were dominated by Catholics, especially his family members and their friends.

Diệm also secretly maintained contact with high-ranking leaders of the Democratic Republic of Vietnam, attempting to convince them to leave Ho Chi Minh's government and join him. Meanwhile, Diệm lobbied French colonial officials for "true independence" for Vietnam, but was disappointed when Bảo Đại agreed to French demands for an "associate state" within the French Union, which allowed France to maintain its diplomatic, economic, and military policies in Vietnam. In the meantime, the French and the Vietnamese anti-communist, accommodationist nationalists had created the State of Vietnam, whereas Diệm refused Bảo Đại's offer to become the prime minister. On 16 June 1949, he published a new manifesto in newspapers proclaiming a third force different from the Việt Minh and Bảo Đại, but it raised little interest and provided further evidence to both the French and Việt Minh that Diệm was a dangerous rival.

In 1950, the Việt Minh lost patience and sentenced him to death in absentia, and the French refused to protect him. Ho Chi Minh's cadres tried to assassinate him while he was traveling to visit his elder brother Thục, bishop of the Vĩnh Long diocese in the Mekong Delta. Recognizing his political status, Diệm decided to leave Vietnam in 1950.

According to Miller, during his early career, there were at least three ideologies that influenced Diệm's social and political views in the 1920s and 1930s. The first of these were Catholic nationalism, which Diệm inherited from his family's tradition, especially from his brother Bishop Ngô Đình Thục and Nguyễn Hữu Bài, who advised him to "return the seal" in 1933 to oppose French policies. The second was Diệm's understanding of Confucianism, especially through his friendship with Phan Bội Châu who argued that Confucianism's teachings could be applied to modern Vietnam. Lastly, instructed by Ngô Đình Nhu, Diệm began to examine Personalism, which denounced both liberalism and communism, and then applied this doctrine as the main ideology of his regime.

== Exile ==
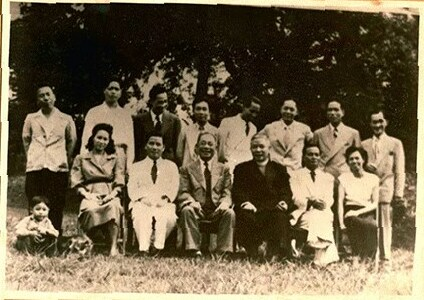
Diệm alongside Prince Cường Để in Japan, 1950

Diệm applied for permission to travel to Rome for the Holy Year celebrations at the Vatican. After gaining French permission, he left in August 1950 with his older brother, Bishop Ngô Đình Thục. Before going to Europe, Diệm went to Japan where he met with Prince Cường Để, his former ally, and discussed Cường Để's efforts to return to Vietnam and his capacity to play some roles in his homeland. Diệm's friend also managed to organize a meeting between him and Wesley Fishel, an American political science professor at the University of California, Los Angeles who was working for the CIA in Japan. Fishel was a proponent of the anti-colonial, anti-communist third force doctrine in Asia and was impressed with Diệm and helped him organize connections in the United States. In 1951, Diệm flew to the United States to seek the support of government officials but he was not successful in winning US support for Vietnamese anti-communists.

In Rome, Diệm obtained an audience with Pope Pius XII at the Vatican before undertaking further lobbying across Europe. He also met with French and Vietnamese officials in Paris and sent a message indicating that he was willing to be the Prime Minister of the State of Vietnam to Bảo Đại but Bảo Đại refused to meet with him. Diệm returned to the United States to continue building support among Americans. Nonetheless, to Americans, the fact that Diệm was an anti-communist was not enough to distinguish him from Bảo Đại and other State of Vietnam leaders. Some American officials worried that his devout Catholicism could hinder his ability to mobilize support in a predominantly non-Catholic country. Diệm recognized that concern and broadened his lobbying efforts to include a development focus in addition to anti-communism and religious factors. Diệm was motivated by the knowledge that the US was enthusiastic in applying their technology and knowledge to modernize postcolonial countries. With the help of Fishel, then at Michigan State University (MSU), Diệm was appointed as a consultant to MSU's Government Research Bureau. MSU was administering government-sponsored assistance programs for Cold War allies, and Diệm helped Fishel to lay the foundation for a program later implemented in South Vietnam, the Michigan State University Vietnam Advisory Group.

The Americans' assessments of Diệm were varied but Diệm did gain favor with some high-ranking officials, such as Supreme Court Justice William O. Douglas, Roman Catholic cardinal Francis Spellman, Representative Mike Mansfield of Montana, and Representative John F. Kennedy of Massachusetts along with numerous journalists, academics, and the former director of the Office of Strategic Services William J. Donovan. Although he did not succeed in winning official support from the US, his personal interactions with American political leaders promised the prospect of gaining more support in the future. Mansfield remembered after the luncheon with Diệm held on 8 May 1953, he felt that "if anyone could hold South Vietnam, it was somebody like Ngô Đình Diệm". According to John Cooney, Cardinal Francis Spellman played a prominent role in creating the political career of Ngô Đình Diệm. In Diệm, Spellman had seen the qualities he desired in any leader: ardent Catholicism and rabid anti-Communism

During Diệm's exile, his brothers Nhu, Cẩn, and Luyện played important roles in helping him build international and internal networks and support in different ways for his return to Vietnam. In the early 1950s, Nhu established the Cần Lao Party, which played a key role in helping Diệm attain and consolidate his power.

== Becoming prime minister and consolidation of power ==
Until 1953, the State of Vietnam was nominally independent from Paris. Since dissatisfaction with France and Bảo Đại was rising among non-communist nationalists, and support from non-communist nationalists and Diệm's allies was rising for his "true independence" point of view, Diệm sensed that it was time for him to come to power in Vietnam.

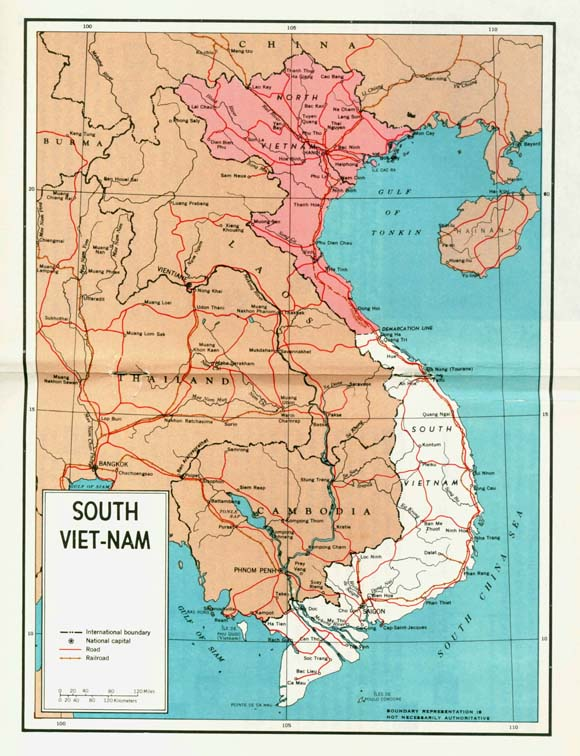
Map of North and South Vietnam, partitioned at the 17th parallel.

In early 1954, Bảo Đại offered Diệm the position of prime minister in the new government in Vietnam. In May 1954, the French surrendered at Điện Biên Phủ and the Geneva Conference began in April 1954. On 16 June 1954, Diệm met with Bảo Đại in France and agreed to be the Prime Minister if Bảo Đại would give him military and civilian control. On 24 June 1954, Diệm returned from exile, arriving at Tân Sơn Nhứt airport in Saigon. Diệm was officially appointed Prime Minister of the State of Vietnam on 26 June. On 7 July 1954, Diệm established his new government with a cabinet of 18 people.

In the first period of his premiership, Diệm did not have much power in the government; he lacked control of the military and police forces, and the civil system's key positions were still held by French officials. He also could not control the Bank of Indochina. Besides, Diệm had to face massive obstacles: refugee issues; the French colonists wanting to remove Diệm to protect France's interest in South Vietnam; General Nguyễn Văn Hinh, a Francophile, the leader of National Army, was ready to oust Diệm; the leaders of the Hòa Hảo and Cao Đài sectarian armies wanted positions in Diệm's cabinet and complete administrative control over the areas in which they had large numbers of followers; and the major threat of Bình Xuyên, an organized crime syndicate that controlled the National Police led by Lê Văn Viễn, whose power was focused in Saigon. In summer 1954, the three organizations controlled approximately one-third of the territory and population of South Vietnam. Besides his own political skills, Diệm had to trust in his relatives and the backing of his American supporters to overcome the obstacles and neutralize his opponents.

=== Partition ===
On 21 July 1954, the Geneva Accords, signed between the French and the Viet Minh, temporarily partitioned Vietnam at the 17th parallel, pending elections in July 1956 to reunify the country. The Democratic Republic of Vietnam controlled the north (including his hometown Quảng Bình province), while the French-associated State of Vietnam controlled the south with Diệm as the prime minister. Diệm criticized the French for abandoning North Vietnam to the communists at Geneva, claimed that the terms did not represent the will of the Vietnamese people, and refused French suggestions to include more pro-French officials in the government.

The Geneva Accords allowed for freedom of movement between the two zones; this put a large strain on the south. Diệm had only expected 10,000 refugees, but by August, there were more than 200,000 waiting for evacuation from Hanoi and Hải Phòng. Overall, there were about one million Northern émigrés, who played an important role in articulating anti-communist discourse in South Vietnam. To address the refugee situation, Diem's government arranged for their relocation to fertile and underpopulated provinces in the western Mekong Delta. The Diệm regime also provided them with food and shelter, farm tools, and housing materials, as well as digging irrigation canals, building levees, and dredging swamp-lands to help stabilise their lives.

=== Establishing control ===
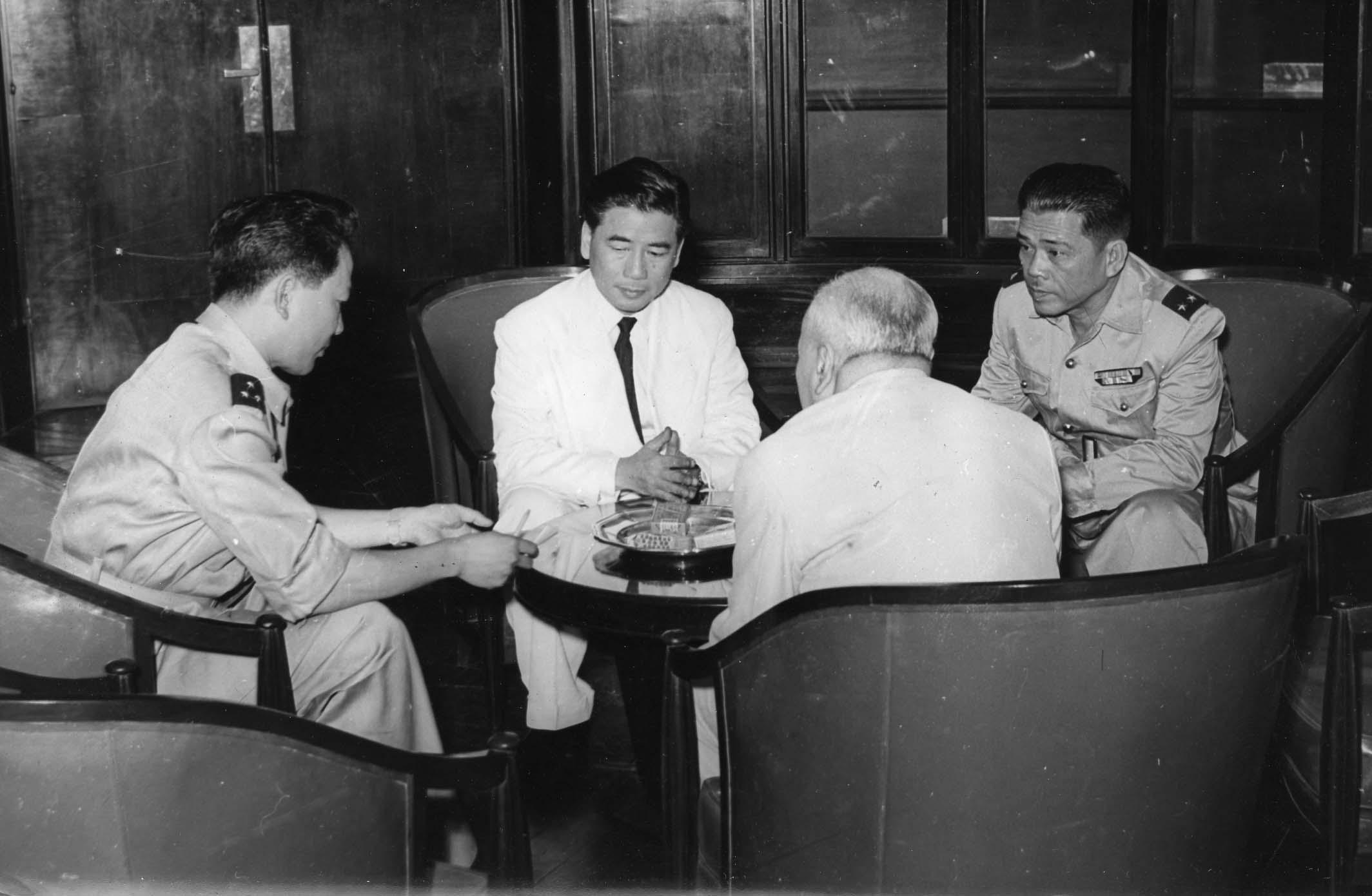
Prime Minister Diệm (centre-left) meeting with General Nguyễn Văn Hinh, Lê Văn Viễn and Nguyễn Văn Xuân in October 1954.

In August 1954, Diệm also had to face the "Hinh crisis" when Hinh launched a series of public attacks on Diem, proclaiming that South Vietnam needed a "strong and popular" leader, as well as threatening to coup. However, at the end of 1954, Diệm successfully forced Hinh to resign from his post. Hinh had to flee to Paris and hand over his command of the national army to General Nguyễn Văn Vy. But the National Army officers favoured Diệm's leadership over General Vy, which forced him to flee to Paris. Despite the failure of Hinh's alleged coup, the French continued to encourage Diệm's enemies in an attempt to destabilize him.

On 31 December 1954, Diệm established the National Bank of Vietnam and replaced the Indochinese banknotes with new Vietnamese banknotes. In early 1955, although American advisors encouraged Diệm to negotiate with the leaders of the political-religious forces who threatened to overthrow his position and to forge an anti-communist bloc, he was determined to attack his enemies to consolidate his power. In April 1955, Diệm's army forces took most of Bình Xuyên's posts in Saigon after a victory in the Battle of Saigon. Within a few months, Diệm's troops wiped out the Bình Xuyên's remnants, leaving only a few small bands, who then joined forces with the communists.

The defeat of Bình Xuyên increased the authority and prestige of Diệm's government and marked the end of French efforts to remove Diệm. Most of the Cao Đài leaders chose to rally to Diệm's government. Diệm then dismantled the private armies of the Cao Đài and Hòa Hảo religious sects. By the end of 1955, Diệm had almost taken control of South Vietnam, and his government was stronger than ever before. In April 1956, along with the capture of Ba Cụt, the leader of the last Hòa Hảo rebels, Diệm almost subdued all of his non-communist enemies, and could focus on his Vietnamese communist opponents. According to Miller, Diệm's capacity in subduing his enemies and consolidating his power strengthened U.S. support of his government, although the U.S. government had planned to withdraw its backing from Diệm during his early difficult years of leadership.

== Presidency (1955–1963) ==
=== Establishment of the Republic of Vietnam ===
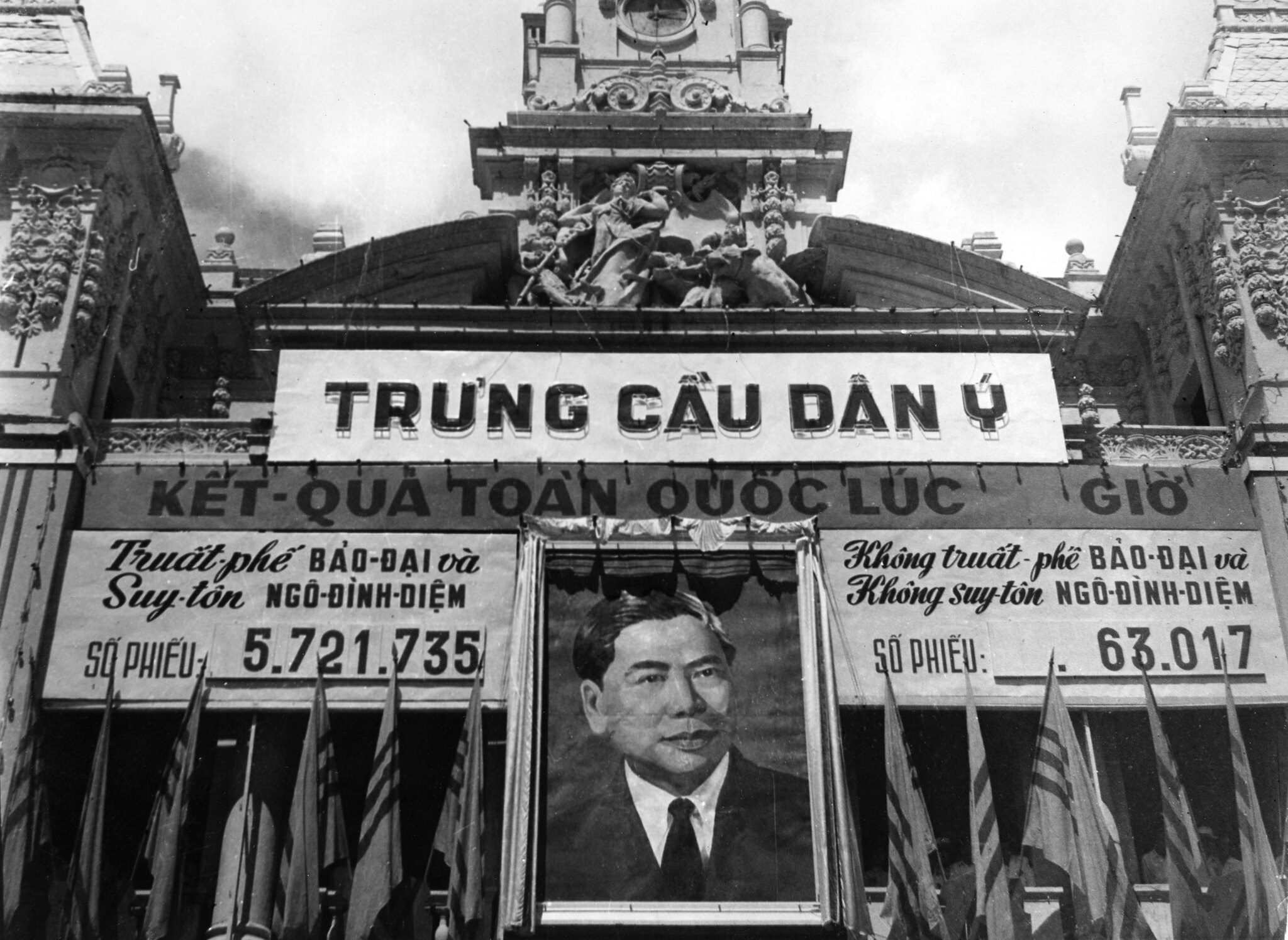
Results of the 1955 referendum posted on Saigon City Hall

In South Vietnam, a referendum was scheduled for 23 October 1955 to determine the future direction of the south, in which the people would choose Diệm or Bảo Đại as the leader of South Vietnam. Diệm, with the support of his brother Ngô Đình Nhu and the Cần Lao Party, used an avid propaganda campaign to destroy Bảo Đại's reputation and garner support for Diem. Supporters of Bảo Đại were not allowed to campaign, and were physically attacked by Nhu's workers. Official results showed 98.2 per cent of voters favoured Diệm, an implausibly high result that was condemned as fraudulent. The total number of votes far exceeded the number of registered voters by over 380,000, further evidence that the referendum was heavily rigged. For example, only 450,000 voters were registered in Saigon, but 605,025 were said to have voted for Diệm.

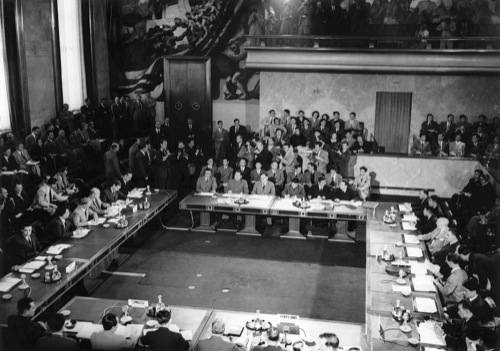
Representatives meeting at the 1954 Geneva Accords

On 26 October 1955, Diệm proclaimed the formation of the Republic of Vietnam, with himself as its first President until 26 October 1956. The first Constitution provided articles to establish the republic and organize the election of its president. The 1954 Geneva Accords prescribed elections to reunify the country in 1956. Diệm refused to hold these elections, claiming that a free election was not possible in the North and that since the previous State of Vietnam had not signed the accords, they were not bound by it. Diệm claimed his government had the legal right to refuse the general elections, because the State of Vietnam had been recognized by France as a fully sovereign state within the French Union on 4 June 1954 and the country became independent from the treaties signed by France. According to historian Keith Taylor, Diệm's rejection of the Geneva Accords was a way of objecting to the French colonization of Vietnam, while at the same time expressing his opinion of Bảo Đại, and the establishment of the First Republic of Vietnam served to assert Vietnamese independence from France. At the same time, the first Constitution of the Republic of Vietnam was promulgated. According to the Constitution, the President was granted an inordinate amount of power, and his governing style became increasingly authoritarian over time.

Diệm's rule was authoritarian and nepotistic. His most trusted official was his brother Nhu, leader of the primary pro-Diệm party, the Cần Lao Party. Nhu was an opium addict and admirer of Adolf Hitler. He modeled the Cần Lao secret police's marching style and torture styles on Nazi methodology. Cẩn, another brother, was put in charge of the former Imperial City of Huế. Although neither Cẩn nor Nhu held any official role in the government, they ruled their regions of South Vietnam absolutely, commanding private armies and secret police forces. Diệm's youngest brother Luyện was appointed Ambassador to the United Kingdom. His elder brother, Ngô Đình Thục, was Archbishop of Huế. Despite this, Thuc lived in the Presidential Palace, along with Nhu, Nhu's wife, and Diệm. Diệm was nationalistic, devoutly Catholic, anti-Communist, and preferred the philosophies of personalism and Confucianism.

Presidential Standard of South Vietnam (1955–1963)

Diệm's rule was also pervaded by family corruption. Cẩn was widely believed to be involved in several illegal operations, namely the illegal smuggling of rice to North Vietnam on the black market, the opium trade via Laos, in monopolizing the cinnamon trade, and amassing a fortune in foreign banks. With Nhu, Cẩn competed for U.S. contracts and rice trade. Thuc, the most powerful religious leader in the country, was allowed to solicit "voluntary contributions to the Church" from Saigon businessmen, which was likened to "tax notices". Thuc also used his position to acquire farms, businesses, urban real estate, rental property, and rubber plantations in the name of the Catholic Church. He also used Army of the Republic of Vietnam (ARVN) personnel to work on his timber and construction projects. The Nhus amassed a fortune by running numbers and lottery rackets, manipulating currency and extorting money from Saigon businesses, while Luyen became a multimillionaire by speculating in Piastres and British Pounds on the currency exchange using inside government information.

However, Miller wrote that Diệm also clamped down on corruption. South Vietnam was divided into colonial-era provinces, of which governors enjoyed sweeping powers and firmly controlled local administrations, creating a problem of corruption and cronyism. The governors were seen as petty tyrants, and Diệm launched corruption probes while also replacing many of the governors. However, starting in 1954, the political turmoil prevented him from taking further measures. The MSUG, an American advisory body created to aid the Diệm's regime, recommended that Diệm centralize power by abolishing local administrations and reforming the existing ones into much larger "areas", with much less power and no financial autonomy. Diệm objected to abolishing the position of province chiefs, arguing that only local governments could address "the needs of local people" as he believed that requiring fiscal self-sufficiency from the local governments was key to creating the "ethos of mutual responsibility" – a key concept in Diệm's communitarian interpretation of democracy.

The Cần Lao Party played a key role in Diệm's regime, often acting as much more than a tool of political organization. Initially, the party acted secretly based on a network of cells, and each member only knew the identities of a few other members. When necessary, the Party could assume the role of the government. After 1954, the existence of the party was recognized, but its activities were hidden from public view. In the early 1950s, Diệm and Nhu used the party to mobilize support for Diệm's political movements. According to the Republic of Vietnam decree 116/BNV/CT, the Cần Lao Party was established on 2 September 1954. Personalism, as part of Person Dignity Theory, officially became the basic doctrine of Diệm's regime, reflected in the Constitution's preface, which declared that "Building Politics, Economy, Society, Culture for the people based on respecting Personalism".

=== Elections ===
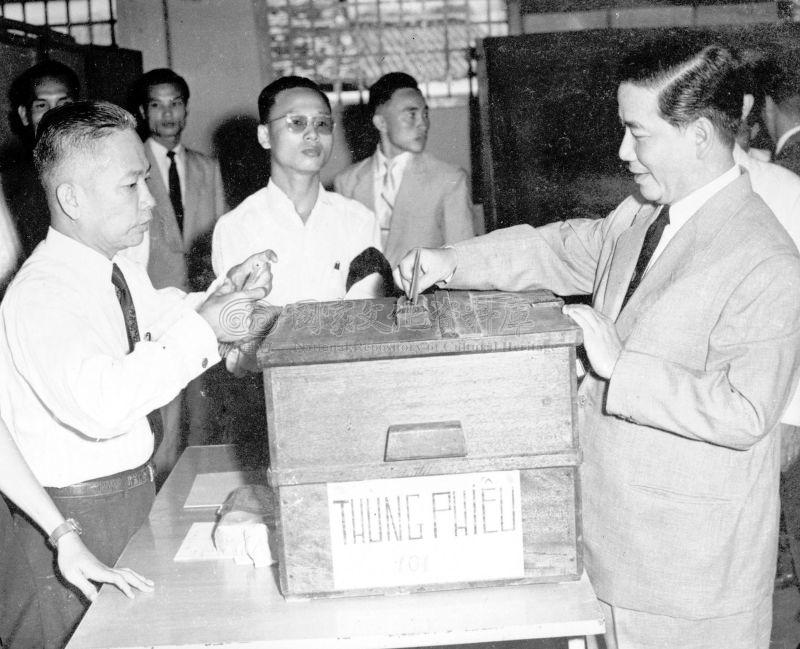
Diệm (right) voting in the 1959 parliamentary election

According to Miller, democracy, to Diệm, was rooted in his dual identity as Confucian and Catholic, and was associated with communitarianism and the doctrine of Personalism. He defined democracy as "a social ethos based on certain sense of moral duty", not in the U.S. sense of "political right" or political pluralism and in the context of an Asian country like Vietnam, Confucian and Catholic values were relevant to deal with contemporary problems in politics, governance, and social change. In this sense, Diệm was not a reactionary mandarin lacking an interest in democracy as he has been portrayed by some scholars. His way of thinking about democracy became a key factor of his approach to political and administrative reform. Diệm argued that post-colonial Vietnam must be a democratic country, but noted that Vietnamese democracy should develop out of its precolonial models, rather than European and American concepts, arguing that Vietnamese "institutions, customs and the principles underlying them are democratic facts." Researching the Nguyễn dynasty, Diệm asserted that the moral norm of Nguyễn-era Vietnam was that it was founded "on the people", following the Confucian concept of Mandate of Heaven; people could and often did withdraw their support from unpopular monarchs, causing their downfall. Diệm considered it an "indigenous Vietnamese democratic tradition" and wished to make it the basis of democracy that would emerge in Vietnam.

Diệm's ideology of personalism was largely influenced by the Confucian notion that self-improvement meant cooperation with one's local community and society at large; he thought that there is a tension between individual's personal ambitions and community's ethos of mutual responsibility. Inspired by the writings of Catholic philosopher Emmanuel Mounier, Diệm considered his ideology of personalism a "third way" of communitarianism, presenting an alternative to both individualism and collectivism, insisting that democracy couldn't be realised "by drafting and promulgating documents and regulations", but that civil liberties granted by democratic regime to its citizens should serve "collective social improvement", serving each person's community rather than the individual itself.

In 1955, Diệm wrote that "democracy is primarily a state of mind, a way of living that respects the human person, both with regard to ourselves and with regard to others" and that "more than any other form of government, democracy demands that we all display wisdom and virtue in our dealings with each other." In 1956, Diem added that democracy had to foster a feeling of community and mutual responsibility, arguing that respect for democracy lays in "decency in social relations", thus defining Vietnamese democracy as inherently communitarian and not individualist.

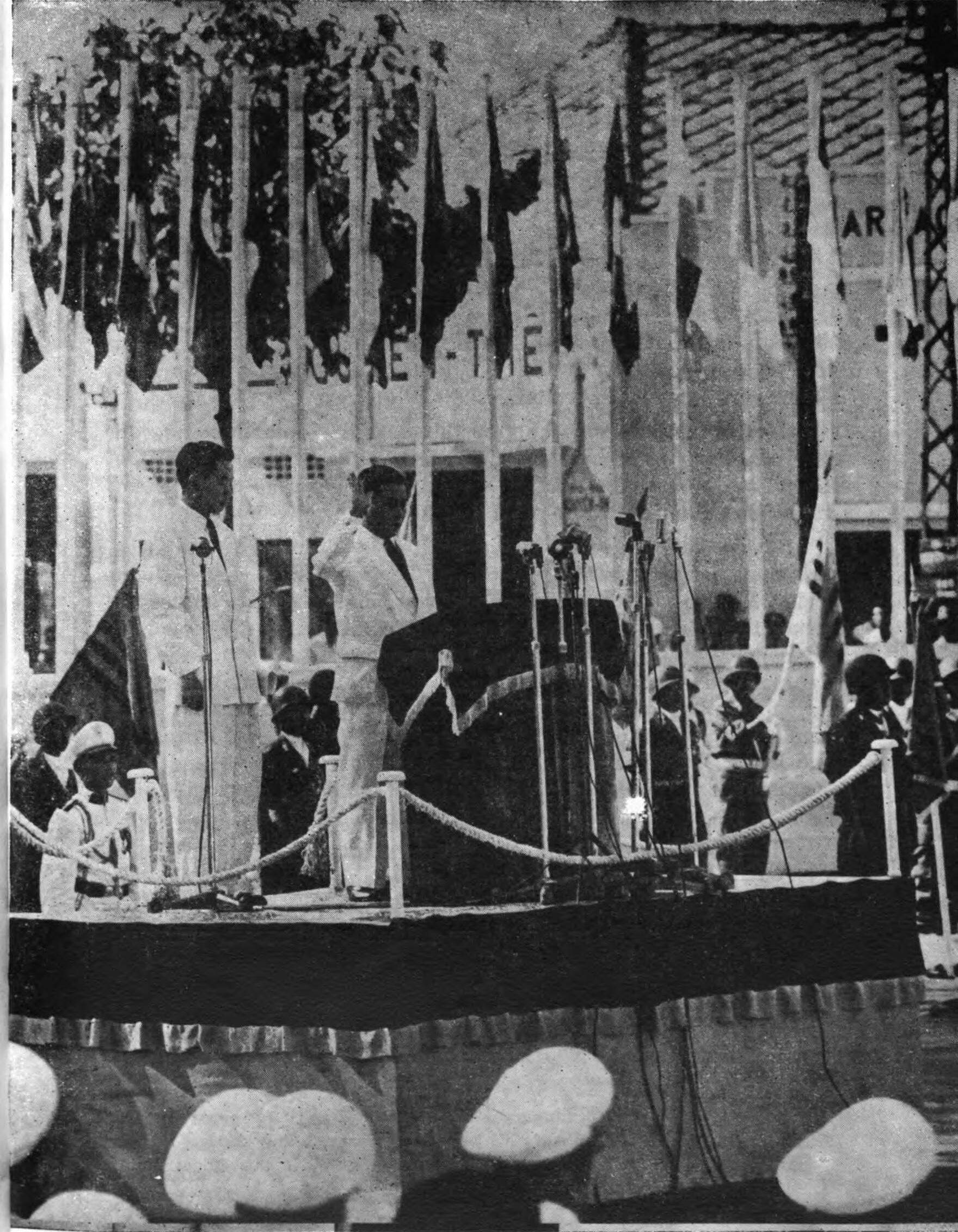
Diệm taking the oath as First President of the Republic of Vietnam

In summer and fall of 1955, Diệm's administration had to decide the fate of the former emperor Bảo Đại. Bảo Đại was initially supposed to remain the head of state until the National Assembly elections, but Diệm's cabinet decided to decide the monarch's fate through a referendum. Miller highlights that despite the popular belief that the referendum was put forward by Edward Lansdale, it was Diệm who decided to organise the referendum as a way to burnish his democratic credentials and attempt to realise his democratic ideas. While the monarch was highly unpopular given his collaboration with the French colonial regime, the new government committed to further diminishing Đại's reputation with aggressive smear campaign and large pro-rallies. Additionally, the referendum itself was considered non-secret, given that the voters were given ballots with the photos of Diệm and Bảo Đại on it and were supposed to tear it in half and deposit the slice with their preferred candidate into the box – this made one's choice visible to everyone. Miller notes that the referendum reveals the eccentric nature of Diệm's understanding of democracy – in the sense of political pluralism, the vote appeared inherently authoritarian; but to Diệm his margin appeared legitimate, as he described democracy as "state of mind" in which the people elect the morally superior leader. Thus Diệm was "adamant that the outcome was entirely consistent with his view of democracy as the citizenry's embrace of a common moral ethos".

On 4 March 1956, the elections for the first National Assembly were held. These elections were considerably more free and fair than the referendum, and some governmental candidates would highly contest with independents and oppositionist candidates for their seats, according to Miller. On this occasion, non-government candidates were allowed to campaign and the election had an atmosphere of legitimate pluralism, but the government retained the right to ban candidates deemed to be linked to the communists or other 'rebel' groups, and campaign material was screened. However, Miller notes that in some districts the opposition candidates withdrew due to police intimidation and military presence. Surprisingly, instead of letting the draft constitution be created by a handpicked commission, Diệm dissolved it and had the constitution be made by the National Assembly deputies instead. The government hailed the process as democratic and transparent, given how the Assembly meetings were open and media presence was allowed; the National Revolutionary Movement dominated the council, but a handful of opposition figures had won seats as well.

However, Diệm's regime of "democratic one man rule" faced increasing difficulties. After coming under pressure from within Vietnam and from the United States, Diệm agreed to hold legislative elections in August 1959 for South Vietnam. However, in reality, newspapers were not allowed to publish names of independent candidates or their policies, and political meetings exceeding five people were prohibited. Candidates who ran against government-supported opponents faced harassment and intimidation. In rural areas, candidates who ran were threatened using charges of conspiracy with the Việt Cộng, which carried the death penalty. Phan Quang Đán, the government's most prominent critic, was allowed to run. Despite the deployment of 8,000 ARVN plainclothes troops into his district to vote, Đán still won by a ratio of six to one. The busing of soldiers to vote for regime approved candidates occurred across the country. When the new assembly convened, Đán was arrested.

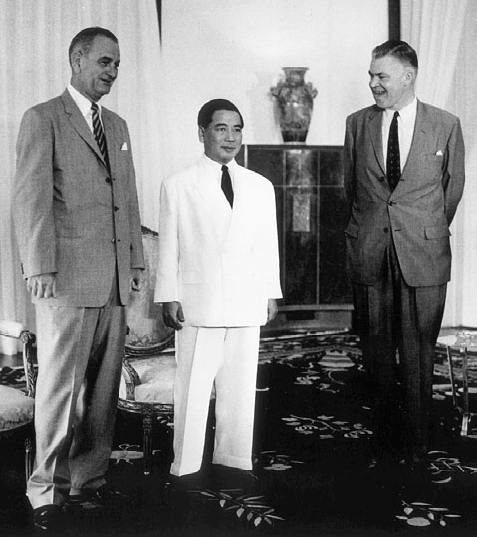
Diệm with U.S. Vice President Lyndon B. Johnson and Ambassador Frederick Nolting in 1961

In May 1961, U.S. Vice President Lyndon B. Johnson visited Saigon and enthusiastically declared Diệm the "Winston Churchill of Asia". When asked why he had made the comment, Johnson replied, "Diệm's the only boy we got out there." Johnson assured Diệm of more aid in molding a fighting force that could resist the communists.

=== Socio-economic policies ===
During his presidency, Diệm imposed programs to reform Saigon society in accordance with Catholic and Confucian values. Brothels and opium dens were closed, divorce and abortion were made illegal, and adultery laws were strengthened. Additionally, Diệm's government established many schools and universities, such as the National Technical Center at Phú Thọ in 1957, the University of Saigon (1956), the University of Huế (1957), and the University of Dalat (1957).

=== Rural development ===
Diệm hoped to develop a national, revolutionary spirit within the citizens of South Vietnam as well as a vibrant communal democracy and an independent, non-communist Vietnam. He saw the peasantry as the key to this nation-building as he believed the peasantry was more likely to put the country before their own self interest in a spirit of volunteerism. A Special Commissariat for Civic Action was established to extend the reach of the Saigon government into rural areas and to help create 'model villages' to show rural peasants that the South Vietnamese government was viable as well as allowing citizen volunteers, and experts, to help these communities develop and tie them to the nation. The Special Commissariat for Civic Action was considered a practical tool of Diệm's government to serve "the power vacuum", and be a force of influence for Diệm's government, in the rural countryside following the departure of Việt Minh cadres after the Geneva Accords (1954).

Geoffrey C. Stewart's study provides a clearer picture of Diệm's domestic policies and a further understanding of his government's efforts in reaching and connecting with local communities in South Vietnam that shows "an indigenous initiative" of the government in building an independent and viable nation.

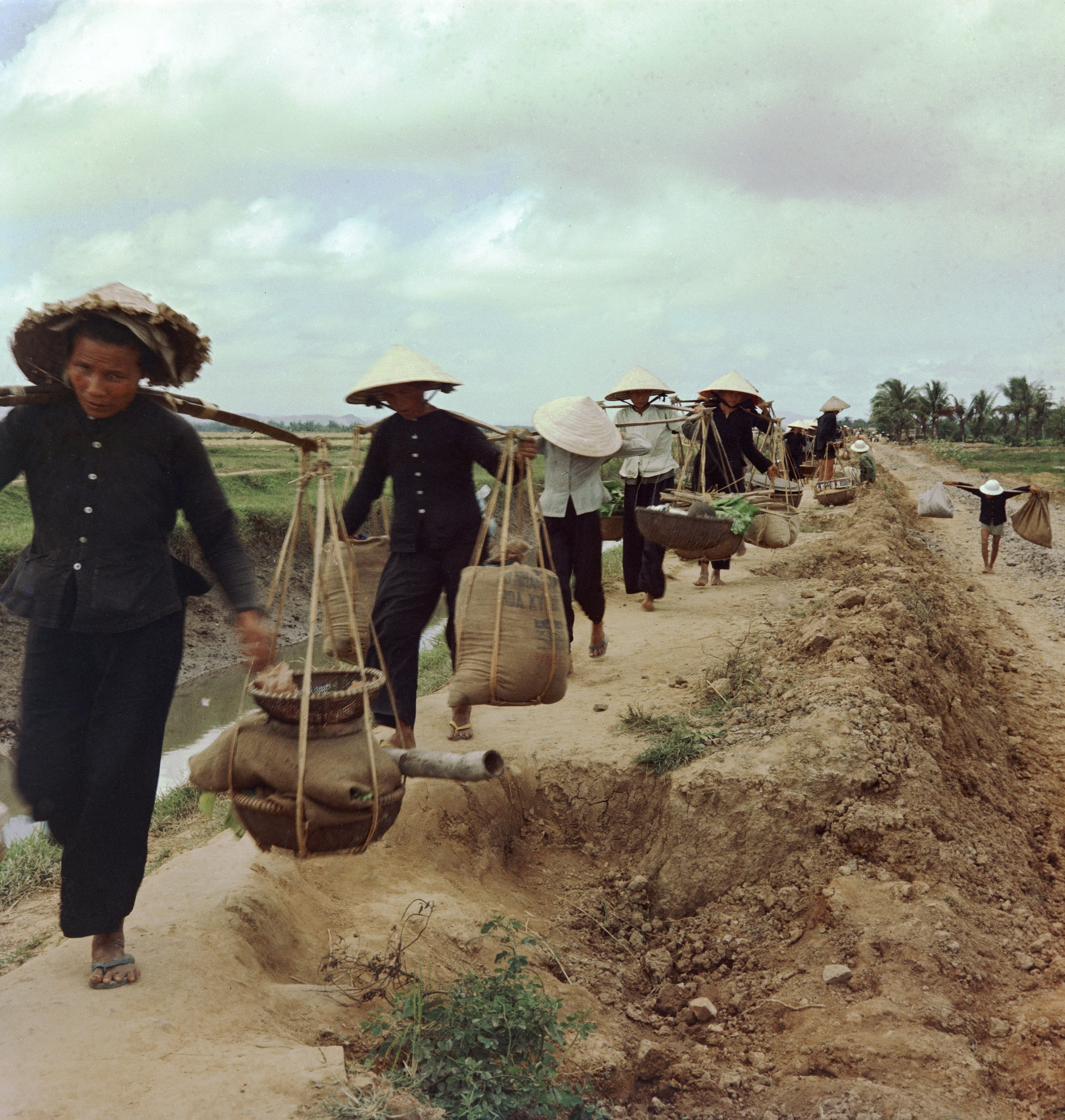
Vietnamese farmers in Tuy Hoa, 1966.

Land Reform In South Vietnam, especially in Mekong Delta, landholdings in rural areas were concentrated in small number of rich landlord families. Thus, it was urgent to implement land reform in South Vietnam. Diệm had two attempts to control the excesses of the land tenancy system by promulgating the Ordinance 2 on 28 January 1955 to reduce land rent between 15% and 25% of the average harvest and the Ordinance 7 on 5 February 1955 to protect the rights of tenants on new and abandoned land and enhancing cultivation. In October 1956, under urging from Wolf Ladejinsky, Diệm's personal adviser on agrarian reform, Diệm promulgated a more serious ordinance on the land reform, in which he proclaimed a "land to the tiller" (not to be confused with other Land reform in South Vietnam like Nguyễn Văn Thiệu's later 'Land to the Tiller" program) program to put a relatively high 100 hectares limit on rice land and 15 hectares for ancestral worship.

However, this measure had no real effect because many landlords evaded the redistribution by transferring the property to the name of family members. Besides, during the 1946–54 war against the French Union forces, the Việt Minh had gained control of parts of southern Vietnam, initiated land reform, confiscated landlords' land and distributed it to the peasants. Additionally, the ceiling limit was more than 30 times that allowed in Japan, South Korea, and Taiwan, and the 370,000 acres (1,500 km^{2}) of the Catholic Church's landownings in Vietnam were exempted. The political, social, and economic influences of the land reform was minimal. From 1957 to 1963, only 50 percent of expropriated land was redistributed, and only 100,000 out of approximately one million tenant farmers in South Vietnam benefited from the reform. Farmers were required to pay for land they acquired under the program, and the program was riddled with corruption and inefficiency.

Support for the Vietcong was driven by resentment of Diệm's reversal of Viet Minh land reforms in the countryside. The Viet Minh had confiscated large private landholdings, reduced rents and debts, and leased communal lands, mostly to poorer peasants. Diệm brought the landlords back, people who had been farming land for years had to return it to landlords and pay years of back rent. Marilyn B. Young wrote that "The divisions within villages reproduced those that had existed against the French: 75% support for the Vietcong, 20% trying to remain neutral and only 5% firmly pro-Saigon government".

Resettlement According to Miller, Diệm, who described tenant farmers as a "real proletariat" and pursued the goal of "middle peasantization", was not a beholden to large landowners, instead of vigorously implementing Land Reform, Diệm had his own vision in Vietnamese rural development based on resettlement, which focused on redistribution of people (rather than land), could reduce overpopulation and lead to many benefits in socio-economic transformation as well as military affairs and security, especially anti-communist infiltration. Moreover, Diệm was ambitious to envision resettlement as a tactic to practice the government's ideological goals. The differences between the US and Diệm over nation building in countryside shaped the clashes in their alliance.

The Cái Sắn resettlement project: In late 1955, with the help of US material support and expertise, Diệm's government implemented the project Cái Sắn in An Giang province, which aimed to resettle one hundred thousand northern refugees.

Land Development program (Khu dinh điền): In early 1957, Diệm started a new program called the Land Development to relocate poor inhabitants, demobilized soldiers, and minority ethnic groups in central and southern Vietnam into abandoned or unused land in Mekong Delta and Central Highlands, and cultivating technological and scientific achievements to transform South Vietnam and ensure security and prevent communist infiltration. Diệm believed that the program would help improve civilians' lives, teach them the values of being self-reliant and hard working. At the end of 1963, the program had built more than two hundred settlements for a quarter of a million people. Nevertheless, the lacks of conditions in these areas along with the corruption and mercilessness of local officials failed the program.

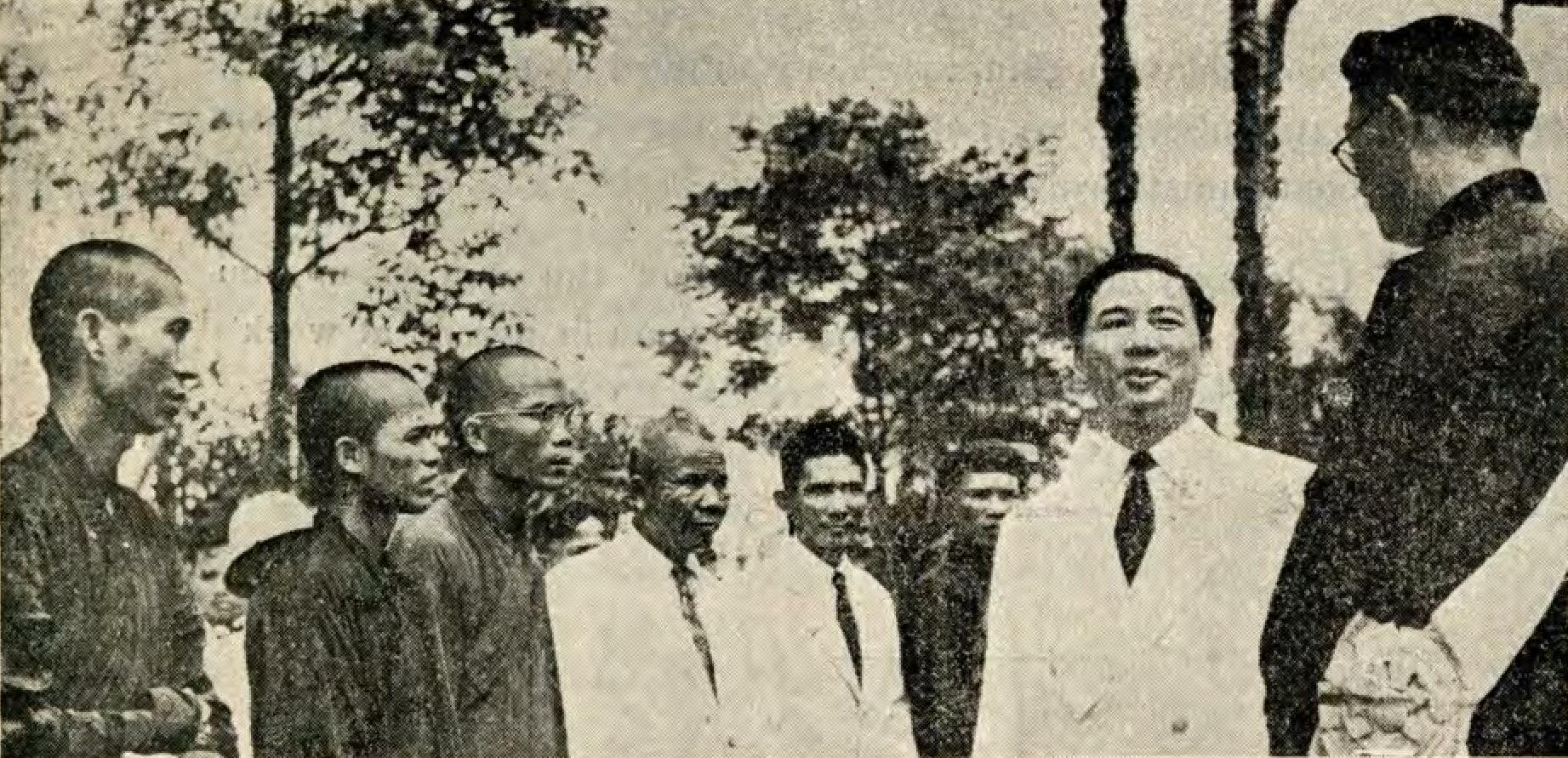
Diem (center right) is welcomed by monks and village elders in central Vietnam.

Agroville program (khu trù mật): During late 1959 and early 1960, motivated by the idea of population reunification, Diệm introduced the Agroville Program, which he intended to physically relocate residents who lived in remote and isolated regions in Mekong delta into new settlements in "dense and prosperous areas" – proposing to offer them urban modernity and amenities without leaving their farms, and to keep them far away from the communists. Nonetheless, by late 1960, Diệm had to admit that the program's objective failed since the residents were not happy with the program and the communists infiltrated it, and he had to discard it.

According to Miller, the disagreement between the US and Diệm over agrarian reform made their alliance "move steadily from bad to worse". Miller argues that Diệm wished to support poor peasantry by gradual modernisation and moderate redistribution of land. Diệm wanted to acquire and distribute the land of rich landowners, but also wished to protect the property of middle-landlords. One of the main concerns of Diệm was overpopulation, aggravated by the mass migration of refugees from the North, something that Diệm wished to alleviate by resettlement. Diệm considered resettlement an important part of his economic nationalism, arguing that utilising Vietnamese land would increase the production of grains and rubber and allow South Vietnam to enter international trade. Ideologically, Diệm considered this policy a key to his "Personalist revolution" – the resettled villages would be "neither communist-style collectives nor incubators of rugged individualism", but they would rather conform to his ideal of communitarianism. Rendering landless peasants freeholders was seen as a step towards reforming the Vietnamese society as a whole.

In late 1955, a Cai San Project was launched that aimed to settle northern refugees in rural areas previously occupied by Hòa Hảo partisans. This project created an intense social conflict between the settlers and Cai San natives, and Diệm offered a concession to the local landowners by decreeing that refugees must sign rental contracts with them. This sparked refugee demonstrations that only started to fade away when Diệm ordered that refugees have the right to buy out the land they worked at. While initially considered a failure, especially due to the fact that the resettlement sparked anti-government sentiment and created social conflicts, Miller notes that Cai San became fairly prosperous by 1960, and the settlement did gradually evolve into a pro-government stronghold, thus succeeding in its aim at counter-insurgency. Many of the counter-insurgency programs progressed too quickly however, and ended up destabilising the regime. When Robert Thompson sent Filipino field operatives into local hamlet settlements, they reported that South Vietnamese peasants accepted Viet Cong claims that "America had replaced France as a colonial power in Vietnam".

=== Counter-insurgency ===
During his presidency, Diệm strongly focused on his central concern: internal security to protect his regime as well as maintain order and social change: staunch anti-subversion and anti-rebellion policies. After the Bình Xuyên was defeated and the Hòa Hảo and Cao Đài were subdued, Diệm concentrated on his most serious threat: the communists. Diệm's main measures for internal security were threats, punishment and intimidation. His regime countered North Vietnamese and communist subversion (including the assassination of over 450 South Vietnamese officials in 1956) by launching campaigns known as "Denounce the Communists". Tens of thousands of suspected communists were detained in "political re-education centers". The North Vietnamese government claimed that over 65,000 individuals were imprisoned and 2,148 killed in the process by November 1957. In a 1961 letter to the International Control Commission, North Vietnamese general Võ Nguyên Giáp stated that each "Denounce the Communists" campaign had resulted in hundreds arrested, wounded or killed, sometimes thousands. According to historian Gabriel Kolko, from 1955 to by the end of 1958, 40,000 political prisoners had been jailed and many were executed. Historian Guenter Lewy considers such figures exaggerated, stating that there were only 35,000 prisoners in total in South Vietnam during the period.

By the end of 1959, Diệm was able to entirely control each family and the communists had to suffer their "darkest period" in their history. Membership declined by two thirds and they had almost no power in the countryside of South Vietnam. Diệm's repression extended beyond communists to anti-communist dissidents and anti-corruption whistleblowers. In 1956, after the "Anti-Communist Denunciation Campaign", Diệm issued Ordinance No. 6, which placed anyone who was considered a threat to the state and public order in jail or house arrest.

Nevertheless, Diệm's hard policies led to fear and resentment in many quarters in South Vietnam and negatively affected his relations with the US in terms of counter-insurgent methods. On 22 February 1957, when Diệm delivered a speech at an agricultural fair in Buôn Ma Thuột, a communist named Hà Minh Tri attempted to assassinate the president. He approached Diệm and fired a pistol from close range, but missed, hitting the Secretary for Agrarian Reform's left arm. The weapon then jammed and security overpowered Tri before he was able to fire another shot. Diệm was unmoved by the incident. The assassination attempt was the desperate response of the communists to Diệm's relentless anti-communist policies.

As opposition to Diệm's rule in South Vietnam grew, a low-level insurgency began to take shape there in 1957. Finally, in January 1959, under pressure from southern communist cadres who were being successfully targeted by Diệm's secret police, Hanoi's Central Committee issued a secret resolution authorizing the use of armed insurgency in the South with supplies and troops from the North. On 20 December 1960, under instructions from Hanoi, southern communists established the Vietcong (VC) in order to overthrow the government of the south. On 11 November 1960, a failed coup attempt against Diệm was led by Lieutenant Colonel Vương Văn Đông and Colonel Nguyễn Chánh Thi of the ARVN Airborne Division. There was a further attempt to assassinate Diệm and his family in February 1962 when two air force officers – acting in unison – bombed the Presidential Palace.

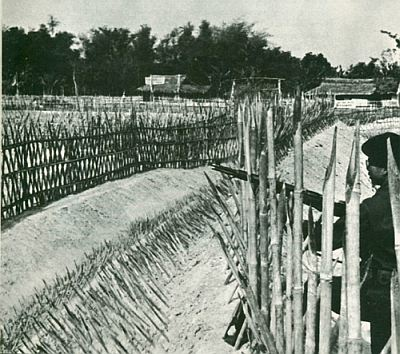
South Vietnamese "Strategic Hamlet"

In 1962, the cornerstone of Diệm's counterinsurgency effort – the Strategic Hamlet Program (Vietnamese: Ấp Chiến lược), "the last and most ambitious of Diệm's government's nation building schemes", was implemented, calling for the consolidation of 14,000 villages of South Vietnam into 11,000 secure hamlets, each with its own houses, schools, wells, and watchtowers supported by South Vietnamese government. The hamlets were intended to isolate the VC from the villages, their source for recruiting soldiers, supplies, and information, and to transform the countryside. In the end, because of many shortcomings, the Strategic Hamlet Program was not as successful as had been expected and was cancelled after the assassination of Diệm. However, according to Miller, the program created a remarkable turnabout in Diệm's regime in their war against communism. Frederick Nolting reported that Diệm named reestablishing control and security as his number one priority regarding the countryside. While appearing receptive to building an "infrastructure of democracy" in the rural areas, Diệm emphasised that it would have to wait until the conclusion of the war. However, the Strategic Hamlet Program was exposed as an almost complete failure in the aftermath of the 1 November 1963 coup that left Diệm murdered. US officials discovered, for example, that only 20% of the 8,600 hamlets that the Diệm regime had reported "Complete" met the minimum American standards of security and readiness.

=== Religious policies and the Buddhist crisis ===
Diệm attempted to enshrine the importance of religion in the Republic of Vietnam. However, unlike Indonesia under Sukarno, South Vietnam neither created a Ministry of Religious Affairs nor tried to control religious activities. The Republic's Personalist Revolution sought to offer a framework for religious freedom and diversity as a counter to communism's atheism. This approach, while intending to strengthen anticommunist nationalism, inadvertently amplified religious consciousness, particularly among Buddhist activists.

South Vietnam was often portrayed as having a Buddhist majority, comprising over 70% of the population. These figures, reported by foreign journalists, were overestimated, as Westerners commonly mistook folk religion for Buddhism. The actual number of Buddhists was much smaller, at most about 27%.

Diệm was widely regarded by "orthodox" historians as having pursued pro-Catholic policies that antagonized many Buddhists. Specifically, the government was regarded as being biased towards Catholics in public service and military promotions, as well as the allocation of land and business favors. The distribution of firearms to village self-defense militias intended to repel Viet Cong (VC) guerrillas was done so that weapons were given only to Catholics. The "private" status that was imposed on Buddhism by the French, which required official permission to conduct public activities, was not repealed by Diệm.

Portrayals by Western media at the time were distorted, as Vietnamese Buddhism in fact flourished under Diệm's First Republic. Słowiak argues that Diệm's favoritism towards Catholics was not a sign of corruption and nepotism, but that it was necessary for Diệm to favor people loyal towards him, given the precarious internal situation of Vietnam. Diệm had contributed to Buddhist communities in South Vietnam by giving them permission to carry out activities that were banned by the French and supported money for Buddhist schools, ceremonies, and building more pagodas. Among the eighteen members of Diệm's cabinet, there were five Catholics, five Confucianists, and eight Buddhists, including a vice-president and a foreign minister. Only three of the top nineteen military officials were Catholics. Of South Vietnam's 4,766 pagodas, 1,275 were built during Diệm's rule, with many receiving government financial support.

The regime's relations with the United States worsened during 1963, as discontent among South Vietnam's Buddhist majority was simultaneously heightened. In May, in the heavily Buddhist central city of Huế – the seat of Diệm's elder brother as the local Catholic archbishop – the Buddhist majority was prohibited from displaying Buddhist flags during Vesak celebrations commemorating the birth of Gautama Buddha when the government cited a regulation prohibiting the display of non-government flags. A few days earlier, however, white and yellow Catholic papal flags flew at the 25th anniversary commemoration of Ngô Đình Thục's elevation to the rank of bishop. According to Miller, Diệm then proclaimed the flag embargo because he was annoyed with the commemoration for Thục. However, the ban on religious flags led to a protest led by Thích Trí Quang against the government, which was suppressed by Diệm's forces, and unarmed civilians were killed in the clash. Diệm and his supporters blamed the Việt Cộng for the deaths and claimed the protesters were responsible for the violence. Although the provincial chief expressed sorrow for the killings and offered to compensate the victims' families, they resolutely denied that government forces were responsible for the killings and blamed the Viet Cong. According to Diệm, it was the communists who threw a grenade into the crowd.

The Buddhists pushed for a five-point agreement: freedom to fly religious flags, an end to arbitrary arrests, compensation for the Huế victims, punishment for the officials responsible, and religious equality. Diệm then banned demonstrations and ordered his forces to arrest those who engaged in civil disobedience. On 3 June 1963, protesters attempted to march towards the Từ Đàm pagoda. Six waves of ARVN tear gas and attack dogs failed to disperse the crowds. Finally, brownish-red liquid chemicals were doused on praying protesters, resulting in 67 being hospitalized for chemical injuries. A curfew was subsequently enacted.

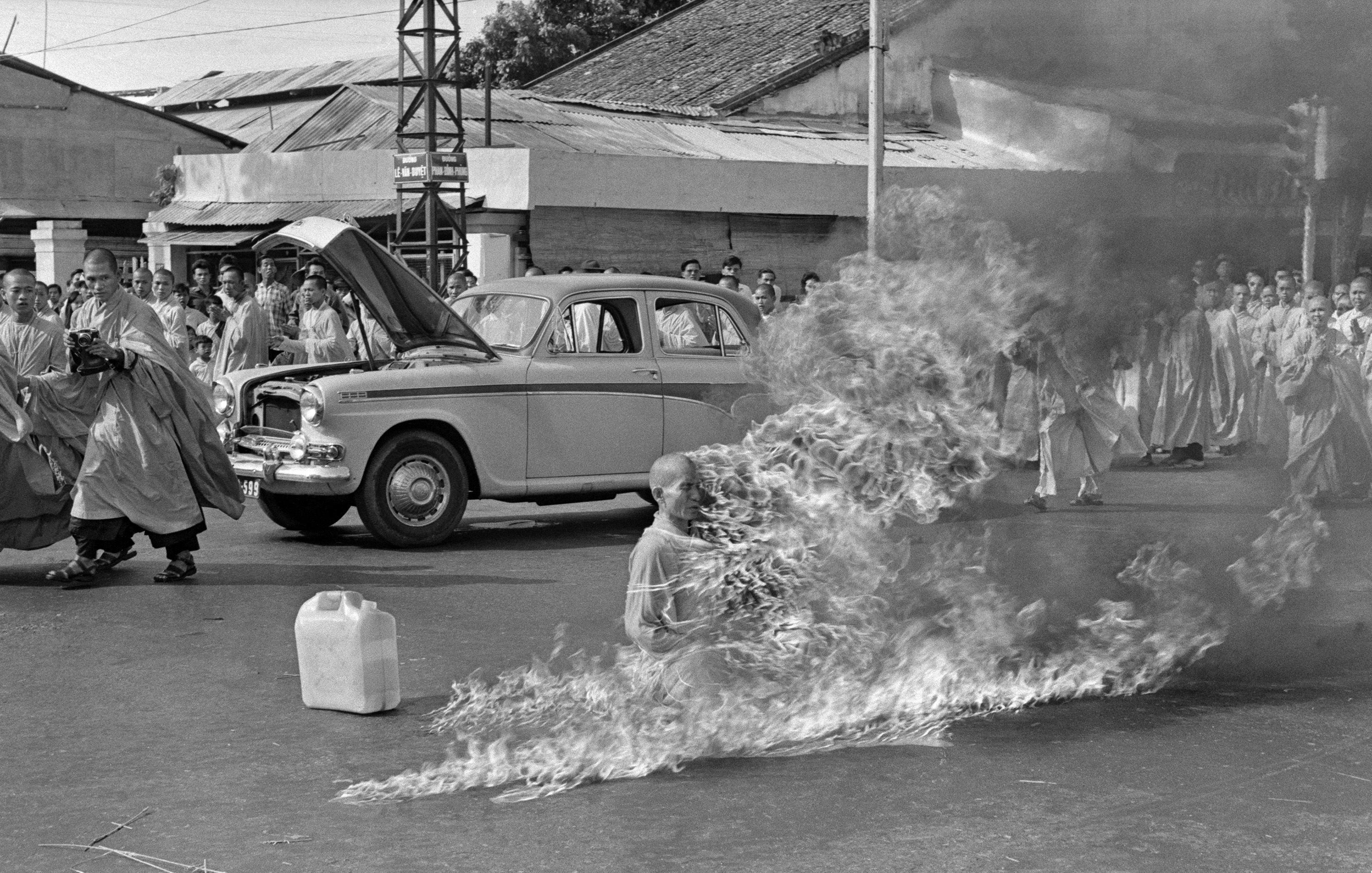
Buddhist monk, Thích Quảng Đức, set himself on fire in the middle of a busy Saigon intersection in protest of Diệm's policies

The turning point came in June when a Buddhist monk, Thích Quảng Đức, set himself on fire in the middle of a busy Saigon intersection in protest of Diệm's policies; photos of this event were disseminated around the world, and for many people these pictures came to represent the failure of Diệm's government. A number of other monks publicly self-immolated, and the US grew increasingly frustrated with the unpopular leader's public image in both Vietnam and the United States. Diệm used his conventional anti-communist argument, identifying the dissenters as communists. As demonstrations against his government continued throughout the summer, the special forces loyal to Diệm's brother, Nhu, conducted an August raid of the Xá Lợi pagoda in Saigon. Pagodas were vandalized, monks beaten, and the cremated remains of Quảng Đức, which included his heart, a religious relic, were confiscated. Simultaneous raids were carried out across the country, with the Từ Đàm pagoda in Huế looted, the statue of Gautama Buddha demolished, and the body of a deceased monk confiscated. When the populace came to the defense of the monks, the resulting clashes saw 30 civilians killed and 200 wounded. In all 1,400 monks were arrested, and some thirty were injured across the country. The United States indicated its disapproval of Diệm's administration when ambassador Henry Cabot Lodge Jr. visited the pagoda. No further mass Buddhist protests occurred during the remainder of Diệm's rule.

Madame Nhu Trần Lệ Xuân, Nhu's wife, inflamed the situation by mockingly applauding the suicides, stating, "If the Buddhists want to have another barbecue, I will be glad to supply the gasoline." The pagoda raids stoked widespread public disquiet in Saigon. Students at Saigon University boycotted classes and rioted, which led to arrests, imprisonments, and the closure of the university; this was repeated at Huế University. When high school students demonstrated, Diệm arrested them as well; over 1,000 students from Saigon's leading high school, most of them children of Saigon civil servants, were sent to re-education camps, including, reportedly, children as young as five, on charges of anti-government graffiti. Diệm's foreign minister Vũ Văn Mẫu resigned, shaving his head like a Buddhist monk in protest. When he attempted to leave the country on a religious pilgrimage to India, he was detained and kept under house arrest.

At the same time that the Buddhist crisis was taking place, a French diplomatic initiative to end the war had been launched. The initiative was known to historians as the "Maneli affair", after Mieczysław Maneli, the Polish Commissioner to the International Control Commission who served as an intermediary between the two Vietnams. In 1963, North Vietnam was suffering its worst drought in a generation. Mieczysław Maneli conveyed messages between Hanoi and Saigon negotiating a declaration of a ceasefire in exchange for South Vietnamese rice being traded for North Vietnamese coal. On 2 September 1963, Mieczysław Maneli met with Nhu at his office in the Gia Long Palace, a meeting that Nhu leaked to the American columnist Joseph Alsop, who revealed it to the world in his "A Matter of Fact" column in the Washington Post. Nhu's purpose in leaking the meeting was to blackmail the United States with the message that if Kennedy continued to criticize Diệm's handling of the Buddhist crisis, Diệm would reach an understanding with the Communists.

There have been many interpretations of the Buddhist crisis and the immolation of Thích Quảng Đức in 1963. Relating the events to the larger context of Vietnamese Buddhism in the 20th century and looking at the interactions between Diệm and Buddhist groups, the Buddhist protests during Diệm's regime were not only the struggles against discrimination in religious practices and religious freedom, but also the resistance of Vietnamese Buddhism to Diệm's nation-building policies centered by a personalist revolution that Buddhists considered a threat to the revival of Vietnamese Buddhist power. Until the end of his life, Diệm, along with his brother Nhu still believed that their nation-building was successful and they could resolve the Buddhist crisis in their own way, like what they had done with the Hinh crisis in 1954 and the struggle with the Bình Xuyên in 1955.

Jerema Słowiak of Jagiellonian University notes that the American media coverage skewed the true background of the conflict, spreading the "narrative of evil dictator Diệm oppressing good, peaceful Buddhists". Because of this, Diệm was considered a brutal and corrupt dictator in the United States at the time of his assassination. However, Diệm enjoyed relatively good relations with the Buddhists until 1963, and sponsored numerous Buddhist temples, especially Xá Lợi Pagoda in 1956. Vietnamese Buddhists had a nationalist vision for Vietnam of their own, and were political enemies of Diệm, engaged in "a clash of two competing visions of Vietnam". The Buddhist challenge to Diệm was politically motivated and constituted struggle for power rather than a religious conflict – the Buddhists protested mainly against the Ngo family and rejected Diệm's concessions, as their explicit goal was removal of Diệm. Thích Trí Quang, the leader of the Buddhist movement, insisted that the agitation must not stop until the South Vietnamese government is overthrown, and stated his intention to "call for suicide volunteers" if necessary. Edward Miller also argues that the primary cause of the protests was the opposition to Diệm and his agenda rather than the discriminatory policies, as the Buddhist movements of Vietnam had their own political goals that starkly contrasted with Diệm's. Diệm reacted to the Buddhist resistance the same way he reacted to the Sect Crisis of 1955, and Xá Lợi Pagoda raids successfully broke the protesters' movement. The military supported Diệm, and army leaders helped plan the raids and advocated for a forceful response to the protests, and only American disapproval drove military cliques to reconsider their support for Diệm.

=== Foreign policy ===
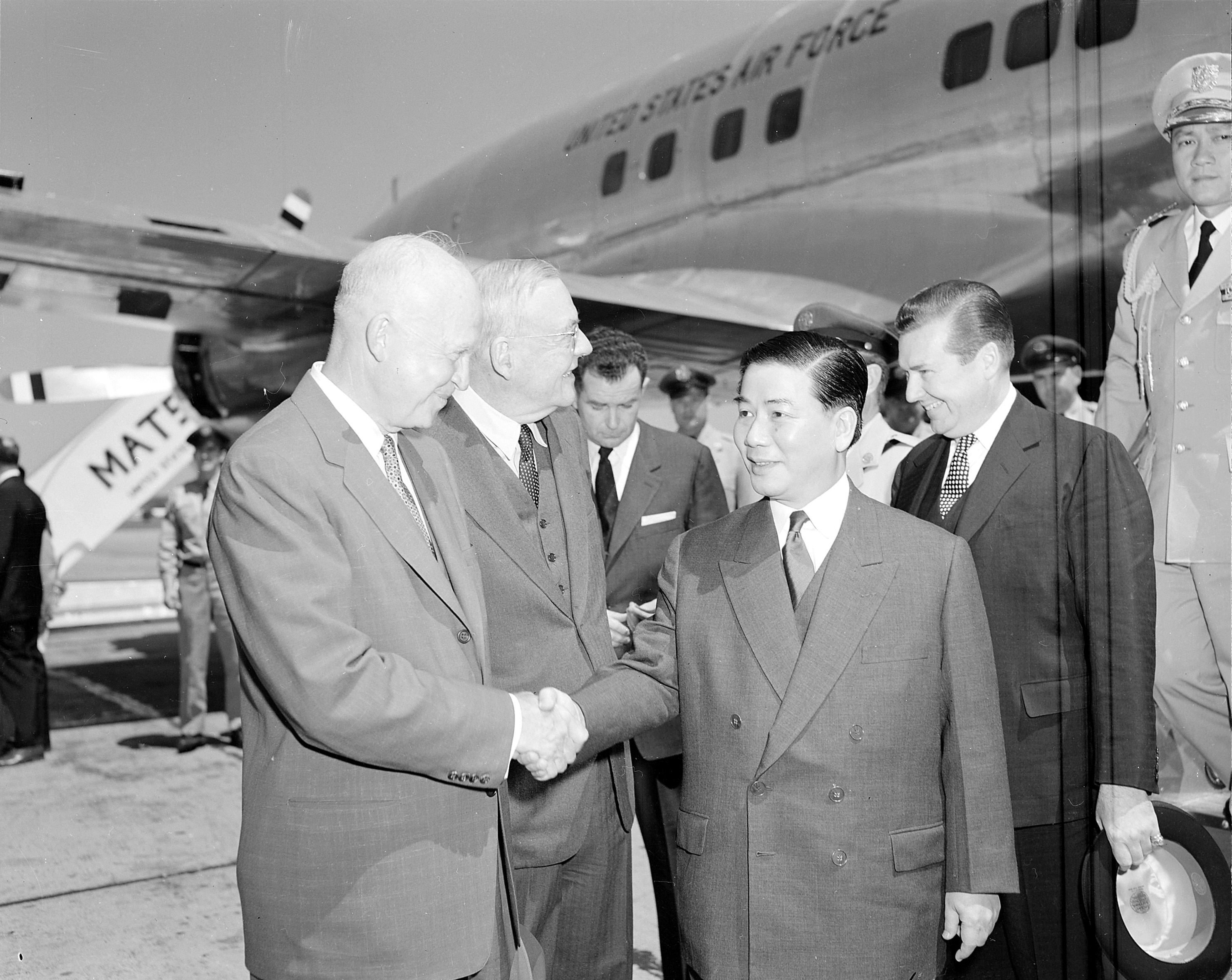
Diệm, accompanied by US Secretary of State John Foster Dulles, arrives at Washington National Airport in 1957. Diệm is shown shaking hands with the president of the U.S. Dwight D. Eisenhower.

The foreign policy of the Republic of Vietnam (RVN), according to Fishel, "to a very considerable extent", was the policy of Ngô Đình Diệm himself during this period. He was the decisive factor in formulating foreign policies of the RVN, besides the roles of his adviser – Ngô Đình Nhu and his foreign ministers: Trần Văn Độ (1954–1955), Vũ Văn Mẫu (1955–1963) and Phạm Đăng Lâm (1963) who played subordinate roles in his regime. Nevertheless, since Diệm had to pay much attention to domestic issues in the context of the Vietnam War, foreign policy did not receive appropriate attention from him. Diệm paid more attention to countries that affected Vietnam directly and he seemed to personalize and emotionalize relations with other nations. The issues Diệm paid more attention in foreign affairs were: the Geneva Accords, the withdrawal of the French, international recognition, the cultivation of the legitimacy of the RVN and the relations with the United States, Laos (good official relations) and Cambodia (complicated relations, especially due to border disputes and minority ethnicities), and especially North Vietnam. Besides, the RVN also focused on diplomatic relations with other Asian countries to secure its international recognition.

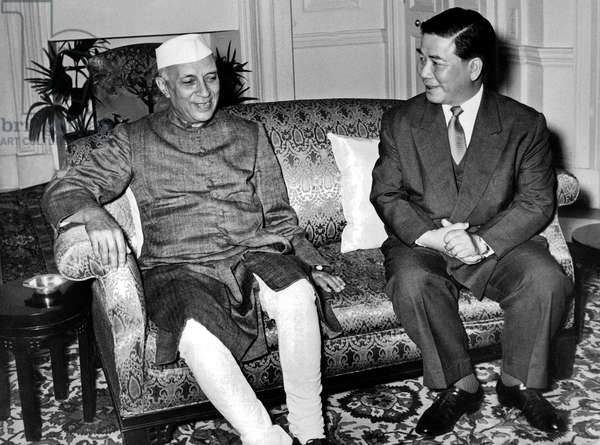
Ngô Đình Diệm meeting with Indian Prime Minister Jawaharlal Nehru during a visit to India in 1957

Diệm's attitude toward India was not harmonious due to India's non-alignment policy, which Diệm assumed favored communism. It was not until in 1962, when India voted for a report criticizing the communists for supporting the invasion of South Vietnam, that Diệm eventually reviewed his opinions toward India. For Japan, Diệm's regime established diplomatic relations for the recognition of war reparations, which led to a reparation agreement in 1959 with the amount of US$49 million (equivalent to US$514 million in 2023). Diệm also established friendly relations with non-communist states, especially the Republic of Korea, the Republic of China, the Philippines, the Kingdom of Thailand, the Kingdom of Laos and the Federation of Malaya, where Diệm's regime shared the common recognition of communist threats.

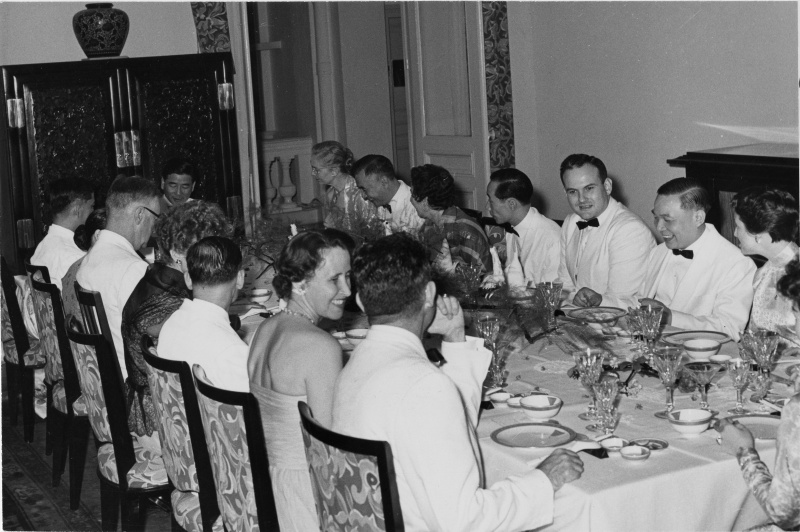
Guests seated at the table for a dinner party at the Presidential Palace in Saigon, 1958

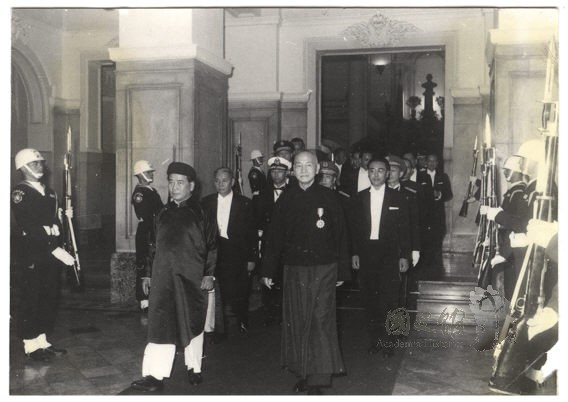
President Diệm being welcomed by President Chiang Kai-shek, 1960

Regarding the relations with communist North Vietnam, Diệm maintained hostility and never made a serious effort to establish any relations with it. In relations with France, as an anti-colonialism nationalist, Diệm did not believe in France and France was always a negative factor in his foreign policy. He also never "looked up on France as a counterweight to American influence". However, in 1963, Diệm's government entered into secret negotiations with communist North Vietnam, partly because of the economic difficulties of the North. The two sides agreed that the two Vietnams would exist for a period of exchange and interaction before general elections and a coalition government headed by Diệm in the South would be established.

Concerning relations with the US, although Diệm admitted the importance of the US-RVN alliance, he perceived that the US's assistance to the RVN was primarily serving its own national interest, rather than the RVN's national interest. Taylor adds that Diệm's distrust of the US grew because of its Laotian policy, which gave North Vietnam access to South Vietnam's border through southern Laos. Diệm also feared the escalation of American military personnel in South Vietnam, which threatened his nationalist credentials and the independence of his government. In early 1963, the Ngô brothers even revised their alliance with the US. Moreover, they also disagreed with the US on how to best react to the threat from North Vietnam. While Diệm believed that before opening the political system for the participation of other political camps, military, and security matters should be taken into account; the US wanted otherwise and was critical of Diệm's clientelistic government, where political power based on his family members and trusted associates. The Buddhist crisis in South Vietnam decreased American confidence in Diệm, and eventually led to the coup d'état sanctioned by the US. Ultimately, nation-building politics "shaped the evolution and collapse of the US-Diem alliance". The different visions in the meanings of concepts – democracy, community, security, and social change – were substantial, and were a key cause of the strains throughout their alliance.

== Coup and assassination ==
As the Buddhist crisis deepened in July 1963, non-communist Vietnamese nationalists and the military began preparations for a coup. Bùi Diễm, later South Vietnam's Ambassador to the United States, reported in his memoirs that General Lê Văn Kim requested his aid in learning what the United States might do about Diệm's government. Diễm had contacts in both the embassy and with the high-profile American journalists then in South Vietnam, David Halberstam (New York Times), Neil Sheehan (United Press International), and Malcolm Browne (Associated Press).

The coup d'état was designed by a military revolutionary council including ARVN generals led by General Dương Văn Minh. Lieutenant Colonel Lucien Conein, a CIA officer, had become a liaison between the US Embassy and the generals, who were led by Trần Văn Đôn, and they met each other for the first time on 2 October 1963, at Tân Sơn Nhất airport. Three days later, Conein met with General Dương Văn Minh to discuss the coup and the stance of the US towards it. Conein then delivered the White House's message of American non-intervention, which was reiterated by Henry Cabot Lodge Jr., the U.S. ambassador, who gave secret assurances to the generals that the United States would not interfere.

The coup was chiefly planned by the Vietnamese generals. Unlike the coup in 1960, the plotters of the 1963 coup knew how to gain broad support from other ARVN officer corps. They obtained the support of Generals Tôn Thất Đính, Đỗ Cao Trí, and Nguyễn Khánh of the III, II, and I Corps respectively. However, commander of the IV Corps Huỳnh Văn Cao remained loyal to Diệm.

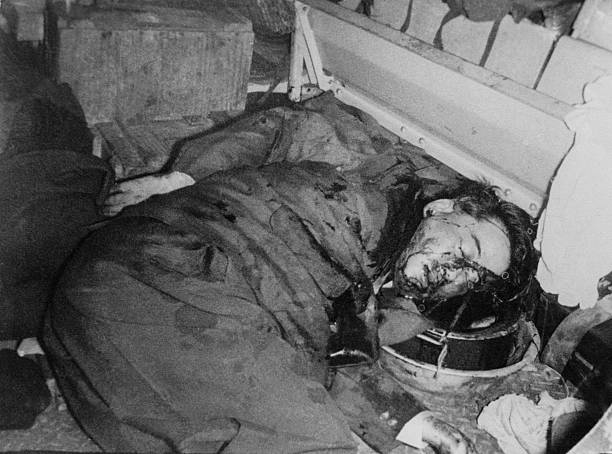
Ngô Đình Diệm after being shot and killed in the 1963 coup

On 1 November 1963, Conein donned his military uniform and stuffed three million Vietnamese piastres into a bag to be given to General Minh. Conein then called the CIA station and gave a signal indicating that the planned coup against Diệm was about to start. Minh and his co-conspirators swiftly overthrew the government.

With only the palace guard remaining to defend Diệm and his younger brother Nhu, the generals called the palace offering Diệm exile if he surrendered. That evening, however, Diệm and his entourage escaped via an underground passage to Cha Tam Catholic Church in Cholon, where they were captured the following morning. On 2 November 1963, the brothers were assassinated together in the back of an M113 armored personnel carrier with a bayonet and revolver by Captain Nguyễn Văn Nhung, under orders from Minh. Diệm was buried in an unmarked grave in Mạc Đĩnh Chi Cemetery. In 1983 the Vietnamese government closed the cemetery, and ordered all remains to be exhumed and removed. Diệm and his brother were reburied in Lái Thiêu Cemetery.

== Aftermath ==
Upon learning of Diệm's ouster and assassination, Ho Chi Minh reportedly stated: "I can scarcely believe the Americans would be so stupid". The North Vietnamese Politburo was more explicit:

The consequences of the 1 November coup d'état will be contrary to the calculations of the US imperialists ... Diệm was one of the strongest individuals resisting the people and Communism. Everything that could be done in an attempt to crush the revolution was carried out by Diệm. Diệm was one of the most competent lackeys of the US imperialists ... Among the anti-Communists in South Vietnam or exiled in other countries, no one has sufficient political assets and abilities to cause others to obey. Therefore, the lackey administration cannot be stabilized. The coup d'état on 1 November 1963 will not be the last.

After Diệm's assassination, South Vietnam was unable to establish a stable government and several coups took place. It then fared badly in the war against the communists. While the United States continued to influence South Vietnam's government, the assassination bolstered North Vietnamese attempts to characterize the South Vietnamese as "supporters of colonialism".

== Honours ==
=== Foreign honours ===
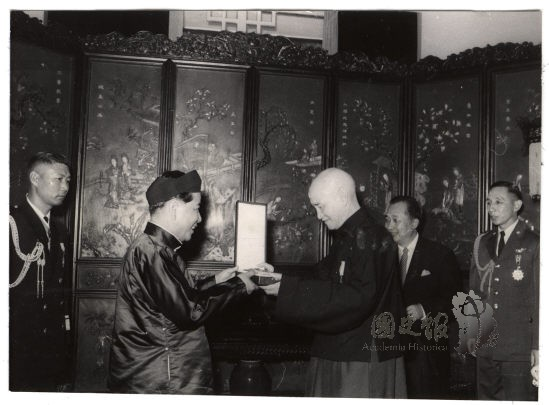
Republic of China President Chiang Kai-shek presenting the Order of Brilliant Jade to Diệm

- Malaya:
  - Honorary Recipient of the Order of the Crown of the Realm (D.M.N.(K)), 1960
- Philippines:
  - Grand Collar of the Order of Sikatuna, 13 October 1956
- Thailand
  - Order of Chula Chom Klao, 27 August 1957
- Australia
  - Knight Grand Cross of the Order of St. Michael and St. George, 1957
- South Korea
  - First Class of the Order of Merit for National Foundation, 1957
- Republic of China
  - Order of Brilliant Jade, 1960

== Legacy ==
Orthodox scholars argue that Diem was a corrupt tyrannical puppet, while revisionist historians believe Diem was an independent leader who knew what was necessary to allow his young regime to survive. According to Encyclopædia Britannica, "Diem established an autocratic regime that was staffed at the highest levels by members of his own family… The military tactics Diem used against the insurgency were heavy-handed and ineffective and served only to deepen his government's unpopularity and isolation."

Diệm's assassination led to the collapse of his regime and to the end of the first Republic of Vietnam. His nine years of power from 1954 to 1963 can be evaluated at many levels by his part in resolving the northern refugees issue, establishing and consolidating the power of his regime, subduing the sects, and pacifying the country. Diệm stabilized the Southern Vietnam, which had suffered in the First Indochina War, and built a relatively stable government in Saigon in the late 1950s. The normality and domestic security created conditions for economic recovery and the development of education in South Vietnam, which contributed educated human resources to serve the nation.

According to historian Philip Catton, Diệm was first and foremost a Vietnamese nationalist who was wary of dependence on the United States and "feared the Americans nearly as much as the Communist insurgents". Diệm constantly clashed with his American advisors over policies and had a completely different understanding of both democracy and Catholic values in comparison to the West. Keith Taylor argues that while Diệm's rule was authoritarian, it was also necessary given the precarious situation of the south. His claim that the South Vietnamese army would gradually gain experience and skill in both warfare and intelligence under Diệm's command, and his assassination turned the tide in favor of the north, with the subsequent governments proving inefficient and incapable of organising successful resistance to Viet Cong advances.

Recent scholarship reveals South Vietnamese discourse illustrated Diệm's agency and single-mindedness, challenging earlier assumptions of his subservience to the United States. Even his contemporaries were surprised when the Pentagon Papers showed just how determined he was to resist American interference. While many anti-communist South Vietnamese came to admire him personally, they rejected his centralized, clandestine political system, which ignored growing public dissatisfaction.

== Sources ==
- Bùi Diễm; Chanoff, David (1999). In the jaws of history. Vietnam war era classics series. Bloomington: Indiana University Press. ISBN 978-0-253-33539-5.
- Buttinger, Joseph (1967). Vietnam: A Dragon Embattled. Praeger Publishers.
- Cao, Văn Luận (1972). Bên giòng lịch sử, 1940–1965. Trí Dũng, Sài Gòn.
- Catton, Philip E. (2003). Diem's Final Failure: Prelude to America's War in Vietnam. University Press of Kansas. ISBN 978-0700612208.
- Chapman, Jessica M. (2013). Cauldron of Resistance: Ngo Dinh Diem, the United States, and 1950s Southern Vietnam. Cornell University Press. ISBN 978-0801450617.
- Fall, Bernard B. (1967). The Two Viet-Nams. Praeger Publishers.
- Gettleman, Marvin E. (1966). Vietnam: History, Documents, and Opinions on a Major World Crisis. Harmondsworth, Middlesex: Penguin Books.
- Henderson, William; Fishel, Wesley R. (1966). "The Foreign Policy of Ngo Dinh Diem". Vietnam Perspectives. 2 (1): 3–30. JSTOR 30182487.
- Jacobs, Seth (2006). Cold War Mandarin: Ngo Dinh Diem and the Origins of America's War in Vietnam, 1950–1963. Lanham, Maryland: Rowman & Littlefield. ISBN 0-7425-4447-8.
- Jarvis, Edward (2018). Sede Vacante: the Life and Legacy of Archbishop Thục. Berkeley, California: Apocryphile Press. ISBN 978-1-949643-02-2.
- Karnow, Stanley (1997). Vietnam: A History. New York: Penguin Books. ISBN 0-670-84218-4.
- Kolko, Gabriel (1994). Anatomy of a war : Vietnam, the United States, and the modern historical experience. New Press, W.W. Norton & Company. ISBN 978-1-56584-218-2.
- Langguth, A.J. (2000). Our Vietnam: The War 1954–1975. New York: Simon and Schuster. ISBN 0743212444.
- Maclear, Michael (1981). Vietnam: The Ten Thousand Day War. New York: Methuen Publishing. ISBN 0-423-00580-4.
- Miller, Edward (2004). "Vision, Power and Agency: The Ascent of Ngô Đình Diệm, 1945–54". Journal of Southeast Asian Studies. 35 (3): 433–458. doi:10.1017/S0022463404000220. S2CID 145272335.
- Miller, Edward (2014). "Religious Revival and the Politics of Nation Building: Reinterpreting the 1963 'Buddhist crisis' in South Vietnam". Modern Asian Studies. 49 (6): 1903–1962. doi:10.1017/S0026749X12000935.
- Miller, Edward (2013). Misalliance: Ngo Dinh Diem, the United States, and the Fate of South Vietnam. Harvard University Press. ISBN 978-0674072985.
- Morgan, Joseph G. (1997). The Vietnam lobby: the American Friends of Vietnam, 1955-1975. Chapel Hill, NC: University of North Carolina Press. ISBN 978-0-8078-2322-4.
- Moyar, Mark (2006). Triumph Forsaken: The Vietnam War, 1954–1965. Cambridge University Press. ISBN 978-0511511646.
- Nguyen, Phi-Vân (2018). "A Secular State for a Religious Nation: The Republic of Vietnam and Religious Nationalism, 1946–1963". The Journal of Asian Studies. 77 (3): 741–771. doi:10.1017/S0021911818000505. hdl:1993/34017.
- Sheehan, Neil (1989). A Bright Shining Lie. New York: Vintage Books. ISBN 978-0-679-72414-8.
- Olson, James S. (1996). Where the Domino Fell. St. Martin's Press. ISBN 0-312-08431-5.
- Stewart, Geoffrey C. (2011). "Hearts, Minds and Công Dân Vụ: The Special Commissariat for Civic Action and Nation-Building in Ngô Đình Diệm's Vietnam, 1955–1957". Journal of Vietnamese Studies. 6 (3): 44–100. doi:10.1525/vs.2011.6.3.44.
- Stewart, Geoffrey C. (2017). Vietnam's Lost Revolution: Ngô Đình Diệm's Failure to Build an Independent Nation, 1955–1963. Cambridge University Press. ISBN 978-1316160992.
- Taylor, Keith W., ed. (2015). Voices from the Second Republic of South Vietnam (1967-1975). Studies on Southeast Asia series. Ithaca, New York: Southeast Asia Program Publications, Cornell University Press. ISBN 978-0-87727-765-1.
- Tan, Mitchell (2019). "Spiritual Fraternities: The Transnational Networks of Ngô Đình Diệm's Personalist Revolution and the Republic of Vietnam, 1955–1963". Journal of Vietnamese Studies. 14 (2): 1–67. doi:10.1525/vs.2019.14.2.1. S2CID 182587669.
- Trần Mỹ-Vân (2005). A Vietnamese Royal Exile in Japan: Prince Cường Để (1882-1951). Routledge Studies in the Modern History of Asia. Routledge. ISBN 978-0-415-29716-5.
- Tran, Nu-Anh (2022). Disunion: Anticommunist Nationalism and the Making of the Republic of Vietnam. University of Hawaiʻi Press. ISBN 978-0824887865.
- Trần Quang Minh. "A Decade of Public Service: Nation Building during the Interregnum and Second Republic (1964–1975)". In Taylor (2015).
- Tucker, Spencer C., ed. (2001). Encyclopedia of the Vietnam War: A Political, Social, and Military History (1 ed.). New York: Oxford University Press. ISBN 978-0195135251.
- Warner, Denis (1964). The Last Confucian: Vietnam, South-East Asia, and the West. Sydney: Angus and Robertson.

Political offices
Preceded by Prince Nguyễn Phúc Bửu Lộc	Prime Minister of the State of Vietnam; 1954–1955	Succeeded by Position abolished
Preceded by Position established	President of the Republic of Vietnam; 1955–1963	Succeeded by Dương Văn Minh (as Chairman of the Military Revolutionary Council)
