= Lê Văn Tám Park =

Park in Ho Chi Minh City, Vietnam; previously was the cemetery

- Công viên Lê Văn Tám
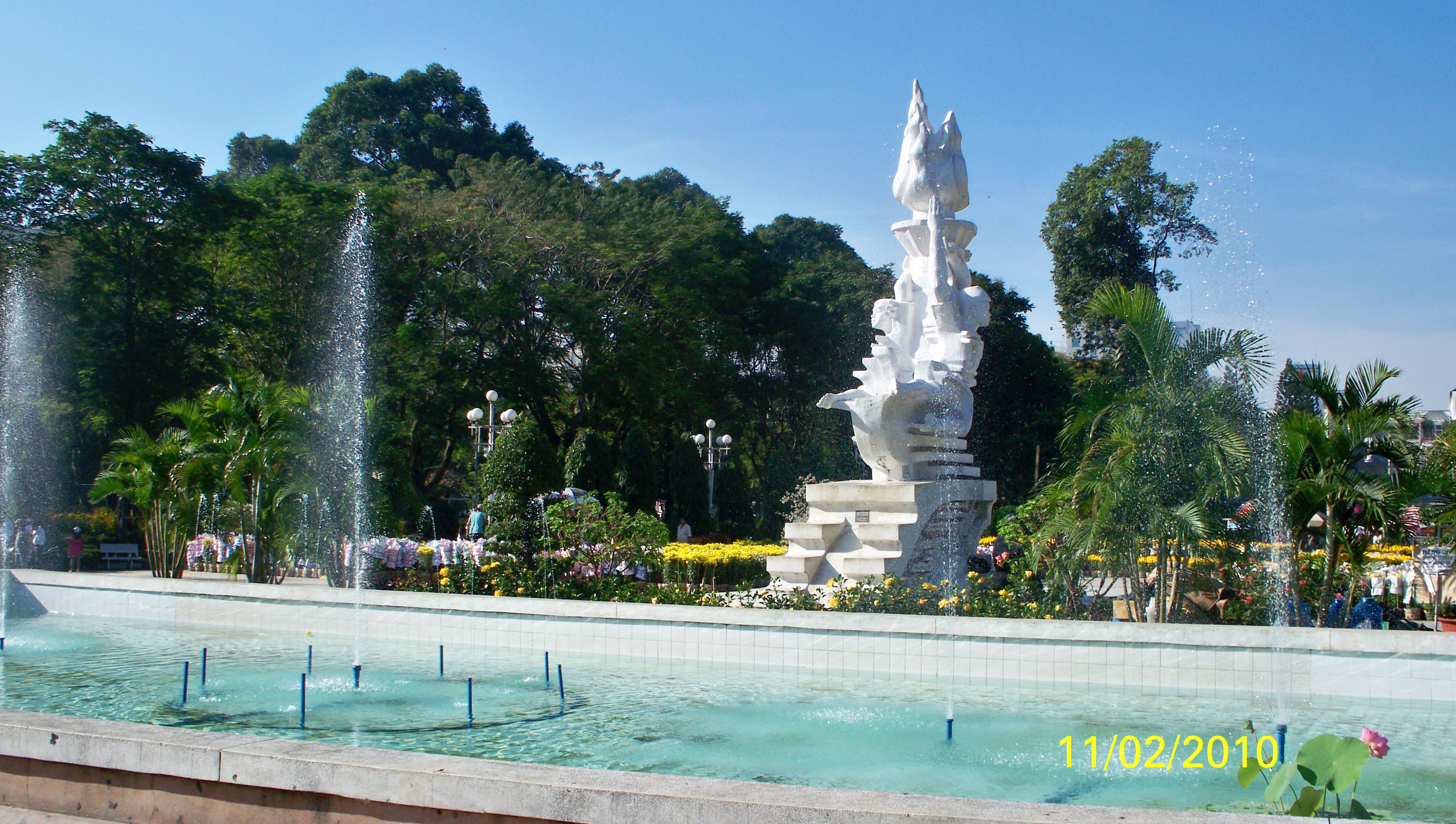
- Interactive map of Lê Văn Tám Park
- Type: Urban park
- Location: Đa Kao, District 1, Ho Chi Minh City (now is Tân Định, Ho Chi Minh City)
- Area: 6 hectares (15 acres)
- Opened: 1985
- Public transit: L4 Lê Văn Tám Park station (proposed)

Cemetery details
- Location: Ho Chi Minh City
- Country: Vietnam
- Coordinates: 10°47′19″N 106°41′37″E
- Type: memorial
- Find a Grave: Mạc Đĩnh Chi Cemetery

Le Van Tam Park (Vietnamese: Công viên Lê Văn Tám), previously known as Mạc Đĩnh Chi Cemetery, is a park in Downtown Ho Chi Minh City, Vietnam. It formerly was a large and prestigious French colonial cemetery.

== Mạc Đĩnh Chi Cemetery ==
The cemetery originated as a military cemetery administered by the French Navy for those killed during the 1859 battle for the Gia Dinh Citadel.

By the 1880s administration of the cemetery was transferred from the French Navy to municipal authorities and the cemetery was used for French governors and colonial officials, high-ranking Vietnamese politicians, generals, former war heroes, celebrities and prominent members of the South Vietnamese society.

The cemetery was built by the French and had a European style confined within a quiet environment. Small winding roads, lined with eucalyptus trees interspersed with straight roads, gave access to all corners of the cemetery; eight-foot, white concrete walls enclosed the cemetery. There were mausoleums, eight to ten feet high and six to eight feet wide, erected by families to commemorate their deceased. Additionally, there were tombstones with a block of stone marking the deeds of the person.

The main gate of the cemetery was located opposite the north end of rue de Bangkok, which was renamed as rue de Massiges in 1920 and the cemetery became known as the Cinietiere de la rue de Massiges. In March 1955 rue de Massiges was renamed Mạc Đĩnh Chi street, after the renowned ancient Vietnamese scholar and diplomat Mạc Đĩnh Chi (1280–1350) and the cemetery then became known as the Mạc Đĩnh Chi Cemetery.

South Vietnamese President Ngo Dinh Diem and his brother Ngo Dinh Nhu were interred there in unmarked graves following their assassinations. The famous French correspondent for Time and Newsweek magazines François Sully and the American missionary Grace Cadman were also buried there. Other notable burials included Nguyen Van Thinh and Lê Văn Tỵ.

== Rezoning into park ==
In the early 1980s, Vietnam's communist government declared the cemetery a corrupt reminder of the past. In 1983 the Ho Chi Minh City People's Committee passed a resolution to abolish the cemetery, and ordered all remains to be exhumed and removed. Family members were given two months to claim their loved ones, most of them was later relocated at Lái Thiêu Cemetery (formerly of Bình Dương province then). Then the mausoleums and tombstones were bulldozed to the ground to create a children's park and playground.

The park is dominated by a sculpture of Le Van Tam, a communist martyr of the First Indochina War, who supposedly soaked his clothes in petrol and turned himself into a human torch to destroy a French fuel depot at Thị Nghè (now Thạnh Mỹ Tây) near Saigon in January 1946. In 2005 research showed that Le Van Tam was a fictional propaganda character created by the Viet Minh.

== See also ==
- Bình Hưng Hòa Cemetery
- Category:Burials at Mac Dinh Chi Cemetery
