= Bình Hưng Hòa Cemetery =

Inactive cemetery in Ho Chi Minh City, Vietnam

- Interactive map of Bình Hưng Hòa Cemetery

Details
- Location: Ho Chi Minh City
- Country: Vietnam
- Coordinates: 10°47′41″N 106°36′45″E
- Type: memorial

Binh Hung Hoa Cemetery (Vietnamese: Nghĩa trang Bình Hưng Hòa) was formerly the largest cemetery in the urban area of Ho Chi Minh City. It was located in the suburban outskirts of the city but due to the rapid urbanization of Ho Chi Minh City, the urban area eventually eclipsed the cemetery. There are several illegal houses built in and around the cemetery, and an estimated 300,000 residents live among the tombs. In Vietnamese custom, the dead are often buried and therefore puts the pressure on land near the city, especially a large city like Ho Chi Minh City.

Burials at the cemetery ceased in January 2011, with the Department of Natural Resources and Environment and Binh Tan District authorities planning to relocate the site's 70,000 graves to another location. The present site is intended to be redeveloped as a residential area.

== See also ==
- Mạc Đĩnh Chi Cemetery
