= Keith Taylor (historian) =

American historian and writer (born 1946)

- Born: 1946 (age 79–80); Michigan, United States
- Education: George Washington University (BA, PhD); University of Michigan (D.Phil)
- Scientific career
- Fields: Southeast Asian studies Vietnamese studies
- Workplaces: Cornell University

Keith Weller Taylor (born 1946) is an American historian. He is Professor of Sino-Vietnamese Cultural Studies in the Department of Asian Studies at Cornell University. He received his PhD from the University of Michigan in 1976. Contrary to the majority of Western historians with expertise in Vietnamese history, who predominantly discuss the events of the 20th century, particularly the US involvement, Taylor's scholarly exploration primarily delves into the pre-colonial history of Vietnam prior to the 20th century. He is now considered one of the pioneer experts in this field. He fought in Vietnam as a soldier in the United States Army, and subsequently has visited Vietnam for research and scholarly exchange many times and lived continuously in Vietnam for two years in the early 1990s while studying and teaching. He has researched all periods of the Vietnamese past and has developed a particular interest in Vietnamese poetry and how it has changed from generation to generation. In 2015 he received the Phan Châu Trinh Cultural Foundation Prize for Vietnamese Studies in Ho Chi Minh City.

== Publications ==
- The Birth of Vietnam: Sino-Vietnamese Relations to the Tenth Century and the Origins of Vietnamese Nationhood. University of Michigan Press. 1976.
- Taylor, Keith Weiler (1983). The Birth of Vietnam. Berkeley, California: University of California Press. doi:10.2307/jj.8501140. ISBN 978-0-52007-417-0. JSTOR jj.8501140. LCCN 81011590. OCLC 1131176955. S2CID 265239427.
- Taylor, K. W.; Whitmore, John K., eds. (1995). Essays Into Vietnamese Pasts. Ithaca, New York: Cornell University Southeast Asia Program. doi:10.7591/9781501718991. ISBN 978-0-87727-718-7. JSTOR 10.7591/j.ctv1nhmtn. OCLC 1091450831.
- Borri, Christoforo; Baron, Samuel (2006). Views of Seventeenth-Century Vietnam: Christoforo Borri on Cochinchina and Samuel Baron on Tonkin. Ithaca, New York: Cornell University Press. doi:10.7591/9781501720901. ISBN 978-0-87727-771-2. JSTOR 10.7591/j.ctv3s8qt9. LCCN 2009280899. OCLC 1262600216. S2CID 160903627.
- Taylor, K. W. (2013). A History of the Vietnamese. Cambridge: Cambridge University Press. doi:10.1017/CBO9781139021210. ISBN 978-1-107-24435-1. LCCN 2012035197. OCLC 843761714. S2CID 161759966.
- Voices from the Second Republic of South Vietnam (1967–1975). Ithaca, New York: Cornell University Press. 2014. ISBN 978-0-877-27765-1. JSTOR 10.7591/j.ctv1ntf5z. OCLC 1056969970.

== See also ==
- David Chandler
- Christopher Goscha
- Victor Lieberman
