= Victor Knauth =

American journalist

Victor Whitman Knauth (10 June 1895 – 2 September 1977) was a journalist, publisher, and broadcasting executive. Knauth served as the editor-in-chief and an owner of The Bridgeport Times-Star, a newspaper published in Bridgeport, Connecticut. He also owned two Northeastern radio stations.

== Early life, education, and military service ==
Knauth was born in New York City on June 10, 1895. He graduated from Morristown School (now Morristown-Beard School) in Morristown, New Jersey, in 1914. Knauth then attended Harvard University in Cambridge, MA as a member of the class of 1918. He left his studies at Harvard in 1917 to enlist with the 101st Field Artillery Regiment of the American Expeditionary Forces. Knauth served as a sergeant and then as a lieutenant in France during World War I. He also served as an instructor in field communications at Camp de Souge in Bordeaux, France. During his military service, Knauth participated in the Chemin des Dames offensive.

== Career in journalism and media ==
Knauth began his career in journalism as a reporter at The Springfield Republican, a newspaper published in Springfield, Massachusetts. He then worked as a reporter at the Atlanta Journal-Constitution, San Francisco Chronicle, and New York World. In 1926, Knauth joined United Press International as a foreign correspondent. He covered news at their bureau in London and then their Moscow bureau.

Returning to the U.S. in 1928, Knauth began working in the public relations field. He joined Ivy Lee, the firm that pioneered the field of public relations. Knauth wrote copy to promote the opening of the Empire State Building and the development of Rockefeller Center. These experience with Ivy Lee led Knauth to co-found Keen, Simmons, & Knauth as a public relations firm headquartered in New York City.

In 1938, Knauth acquired a controlling interest in The Bridgeport Times-Star. He also served as vice president of the Select Printing Company, a publishing company, president of Round Table Press, and an owner of Omnibook Magazine. Knauth purchased WAVZ-1300, an AM station that aired in New Haven, Connecticut in 1949. Nine years later, he bought WTRY, an AM station that broadcast from Troy, NY. (Troy lies in the Albany, NY Capital Region.)

== Social service and philanthropy ==
Knauth served as president of the Norwalk Hospital Association in Norwalk, Connecticut. He also served on the Boards of Education, Selectman, and Zoning for Wilton, Connecticut.

== Family ==
Knauth married medical doctor Marjorie Lord Strauss on January 21, 1931. They had two children: John and Mary.
