= Family Health (magazine) =

- Categories: Health magazine
- Publisher: Family Media
- Founder: Maxwell M Geffen
- Founded: 1969
- Final issue: 1991
- Country: USA
- Based in: New York City
- Language: English

Family Health was an American health magazine. The magazine was founded by Maxwell M Geffen in the 1969. Its target audience was women. The publisher of the magazine was Family Media. In 1981 it was renamed Health. Hank Herman served as the editor-in-chief of the magazine, which ceased publication in 1991.
