= Medical World News =

Medical World News was an American magazine for the medical profession. It was published between 1960 and 1994.

== History ==
Medical World News was founded in April 1960 by Maxwell M Geffen, a New York publisher.

The founding editor of Medical World News was Morris Fishbein. In 1994 the magazine ceased publication.

== Acquisition ==
The magazine was sold to McGraw-Hill and in March 1981 it was sold by McGraw-Hill to Hospital Equities, an operator of health care facilities.

Miller Freeman, Inc. acquired the magazine from Hospital Equities.

== Photo archive ==
In 1985 McGovern Center for Historical Collections (endowed by John P. McGovern) acquired an archive of photographs from Medical World News.

This archive is accessible at The Texas Medical Center Library in Houston.

== Video version ==
In 2020, a digital video-based version of Medical World News was launched by MJH Life Sciences.

The company, under the name of Intellisphere, obtained and filed the copyright for the title in 2013.

== See also ==
- Modern Healthcare
