= Madame Nhu =

First Lady of South Vietnam from 1955 to 1963

Trần Lệ Xuân
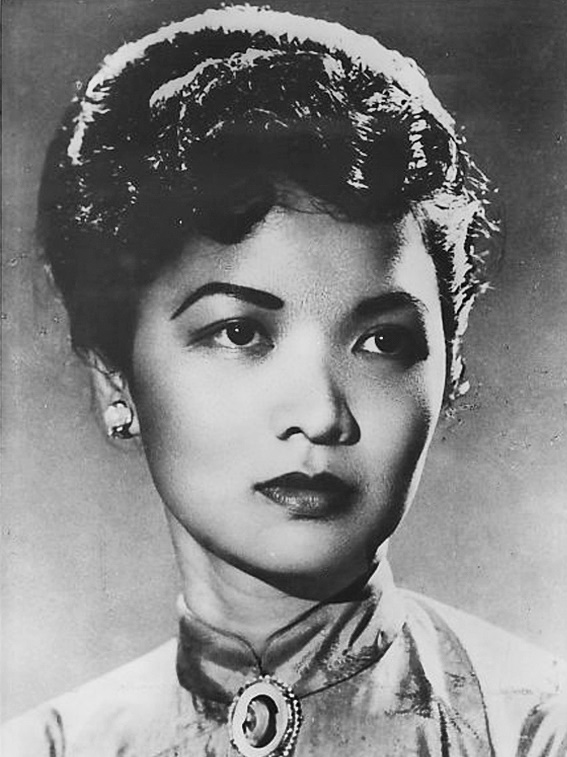
- Madame Nhu in the 1950s

First Lady of South Vietnam de facto
- In role 26 October 1955 – 2 November 1963
- President: Ngo Dinh Diem
- Preceded by: Position established
- Succeeded by: Nguyễn Thị Mai Anh

Personal details
- Born: 22 August 1924 Hanoi, Tonkin, French Indochina
- Died: 24 April 2011 (aged 86) Rome, Italy
- Party: Cần Lao
- Spouse: Ngô Đình Nhu (m. 1943; died 1963)
- Relations: Ngo Dinh Diem (brother-in-law); Trần Văn Khiêm (brother); Trần Văn Đỗ (uncle)
- Children: Ngô Đình Trác; Ngô Đình Quỳnh; Ngô Đình Lệ Thủy; Ngô Đình Lệ Quyên
- Parents: Trần Văn Chương (father); Thân Thị Nam Trân (mother)
- Education: Lycée Albert Sarraut

Trần Lệ Xuân (Vietnamese pronunciation: [t͡ɕən˨˩ le˧˨ʔ swən˧˧]; 22 August 1924 – 24 April 2011), more popularly known in English as Madame Nhu, was the de facto First Lady of South Vietnam from 1955 to 1963. She was the wife of Ngô Đình Nhu, who was the brother and chief advisor to President Ngô Đình Diệm. As Diệm was a lifelong bachelor and because she and her family lived in the Saigon Governor’s Palace together with him, she was considered to be the first lady.

Known for her candid vitriolic comments that criticized and severely denounced the Viet Cong, the Buddhist community of South Vietnam, and the strong U.S. influence and presence in the country, she went to live in exile in France after her husband, Nhu, and her brother-in-law, Diệm, were assassinated in 1963.

== Early years ==
Trần Lệ Xuân, whose given name means "Spring Splendor" or “Tear of Spring,” was born in 1924 into a wealthy aristocratic family in Hanoi, French Indochina, then part of the French colonial empire. Her paternal grandfather was close to the French colonial administration, while her father, Trần Văn Chương, studied law in France and practiced in Bac Lieu in the Mekong Delta before marrying into the ruling imperial dynasty. Her father also served as the first foreign secretary for Indochina under Japanese occupation. Her mother, Thân Thị Nam Trân, was a granddaughter of Emperor Đồng Khánh and a cousin of Emperor Bảo Đại. The Trầns were under observation by the French police who doubted their loyalty to France, with M. Chương dismissed as a "little runt" controlled by his wife, while Madame Chương, described as "beautiful and very intriguing...the one who directs her husband," was known for "her dogged ambition as for her coucheries utilitaires—sleeping around with people of influence from any and all nationalities. Madame Chuong was accused by the French secret police (French Sûreté) of sleeping with Japanese diplomats so her husband was hired by them.

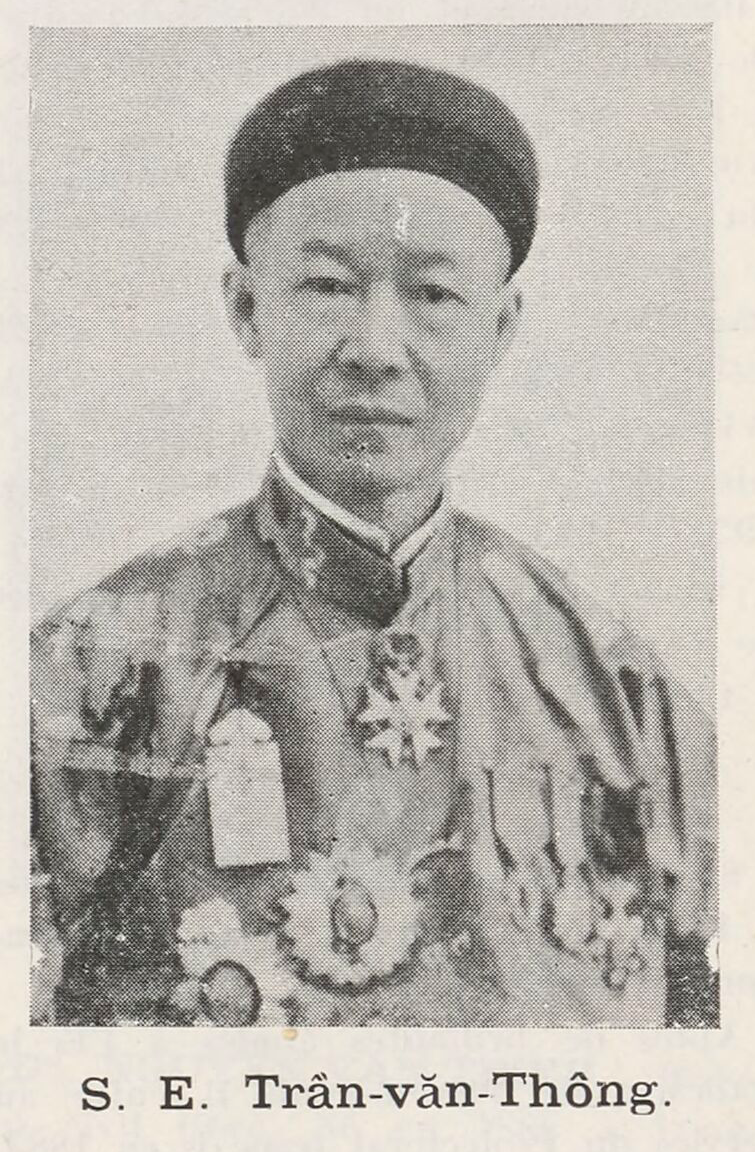
Mandarin Trần Văn Thông, the grandfather of Xuân

Lệ Xuân's education at the Lycée Albert Sarraut, a prestigious French school in Hanoi, was entirely in French, and she remembered as a schoolgirl learning about French history but nothing about Vietnamese history, and of singing songs about the landscapes of France, observing later the purpose of her education was to eradicate any sense of a Vietnamese identity, and to make her into a proper young Frenchwoman. The purpose of French educational policies in Vietnam was always in reference to France's self-proclaimed mission civilisatrice ("civilizing mission") to make all Vietnamese into "Frenchmen with yellow skin," and thus French teachers tried to stamp out any sense of a Vietnamese identity in their students. The message French teachers taught their students was that to be French was to be "civilized" and to be Vietnamese was to be "uncivilized." She then dropped out of Lycée Albert Sarraut.

Lệ Xuân spoke French at home and could not write in Vietnamese. Hence, as an adult, she drafted her speeches in French and had them translated into Vietnamese. She gained a reputation in her youth as a tomboy who loved ballet and piano, once dancing solo at Hanoi's National Theatre. She had an elder sister named Trần Lệ Chi (who married the Frenchman Etienne Oggeri and changed her name to Lechi Oggeri) and a younger brother, Trần Văn Khiêm. Like many other Vietnamese, Lệ Xuân was to find that no matter how hard she tried to be French, the French were only prepared to accept whites as French.

When Lệ Xuân came of age, her mother introduced her to a series of eligible young men, but she insisted on Nhu, who was fourteen years her senior and referred to her as a "little niece" in accordance with Vietnamese custom. In accordance with Vietnamese tradition, they were married three years after being betrothed in 1940. In May 1943, aged 18, she married Nhu, and converted from Mahayana Buddhism to Roman Catholicism, her husband's religion. Madame Nhu later admitted she married Nhu as a way of getting away from her family, saying "I never had a sweeping love. I read about such things in books, but I do not believe that they really existed. Or perhaps only for a very few people". After an uprising by the Viet Minh in August 1945, her brother-in-law, Ngô Đình Khôi, the eldest of the Ngô brothers, was buried alive, and Nhu and another brother, Ngô Đình Cẩn, were forced to flee.

She, her mother-in-law and her eldest daughter, at the time a baby, were captured. Thinking her piano was a radio for communicating with French colonialists, the Viet Minh blew it up and then exiled her to a remote village for four months, where she lived on two bowls of rice a day. The French dismissed Nhu from his post at the National Library due to his brother (Diệm)'s nationalist activities, and he moved to Đà Lạt and lived comfortably, editing a newspaper, where his wife bore three more children. The French war in Vietnam made little impression on Madame Nhu from her home in Đà Lạt, and she often called the war une guerre bizardouille ("a bizarre little war") as the fighting never affected her personally. Nhu was during these years building a secret political party called the Cần Lao (Personalist Labour Party) based on the Catholic philosophy of personalism (people were persons, not individuals) while Madame Nhu later saying "I was alone most of the time. My husband would simply disappear without a word". To improve her husband's career, Madame Nhu befriended her cousin, the Emperor Bảo Đại during this time.

== Rise to power ==
Madame Nhu's brother-in-law, Ngô Đình Diệm, had been appointed Prime Minister of the State of Vietnam by her mother's distant cousin, Emperor Bảo Đại, after the French had been defeated at the Battle of Điện Biên Phủ. At the start of 1955, French Indochina was dissolved, leaving Diệm in temporary control of the south. After the French defeat at Điện Biên Phủ, the French wanted to hang on to a zone of influence in the south by keeping the Emperor Bảo Đại as Head of State, while the Americans wanted to push the French out by having Diệm create a republic. Diệm in the words of an American diplomat had developed "a blind hatred of the French" and the Americans believed that South Vietnam needed an anti-Communist leader who was not tainted with any associations with the French, which led them to back Diệm. Madame Nhu had lobbied Bảo Đại to appoint her brother-in-law Prime Minister and believed that it was her influence that led to the appointment. She was deeply shocked to learn the real reason why Bảo Đại had appointed Diệm Prime Minister was out of the expectation that he would fail, thereby curtailing his career. The State of Vietnam was in a serious political and economic crisis by 1954 that almost nobody expected Diệm to navigate effectively. Nhu never forgave the Emperor and the French for this plot to ruin Diệm.

In order to ensure American support for Diệm, Madame Nhu befriended Americans working at the embassy in Saigon known to be CIA agents. For their part, the French backed General Nguyễn Văn Hinh as Prime Minister, and he in turn had won the support of the Bình Xuyên crime syndicate that dominated the economic life of Saigon. Giving Madame Nhu an additional reason to intrigue against Hinh was his repeated boasting that when he deposed Diệm he would make Madame Nhu into another of his concubines. At a party, Madame Nhu confronted Hinh to tell him: "You are never going to overthrow this government because you don't have the guts. And if you do overthrow the government, you will never have me because I will claw your throat out first!"

To win support for Diệm, Madame Nhu hit upon the idea of enlisting support from the million or so refugees from North Vietnam, many of them Catholics who fled to the south after the Geneva accords had partitioned Vietnam, organizing them for a massive pro-Diệm demonstration on 21 September 1954. The rally in Saigon led to a confrontation on the streets between Madame Nhu and Bình Xuyên gunmen, with Madame Nhu daring the thugs to kill her right then and there, which caused them to demur, and the rally went on. Emboldened by this triumph, Diệm saw a chance to put his Roman Catholic values into practice and to strike a blow at the Bình Xuyên at the same time by shutting down the brothels, gambling houses and opium dens of Saigon owned by the Bình Xuyên while having pornographic magazines burned on the streets (the Bình Xuyên were the largest producers and sellers of pornography in Vietnam).

A referendum was scheduled for 23 October 1955, to determine the future direction of the south. It was contested by Bảo Đại, advocating the restoration of the monarchy, while Diệm ran on a republican platform. The elections were held, with Nhu and the family's Cần Lao Party, which supplied Diệm's electoral base, organising and supervising the elections. Campaigning for Bảo Đại was prohibited, and the result was rigged, with Bảo Đại's supporters attacked by Nhu's paid thugs. Diệm claimed 98.2% of the vote, including 605,025 votes in Saigon, where only 450,000 voters were registered. Diệm's tally exceeded the registration numbers in other districts. As a result, Diệm defeated Bảo Đại and became the first president of South Vietnam. Madame Nhu made no secret of her dislike for Bảo Đại, calling him "that French puppet".

== Post-elections ==
After the election, the couple moved into the Presidential Palace. Madame Nhu was influential on government policy and, since her brother-in-law, Ngô Đình Diệm, was unmarried, she was regarded as the First Lady of South Vietnam. She attempted to syncretize Roman Catholicism with a cult around herself as a modern reincarnation of Vietnam's fabled Trưng Sisters, who raised a revolt against China and temporarily defeated the Han dynasty in AD 40. President Diệm never married and is not known to have had a relationship with any women, though his bodyguard noted he was fond of keeping "good looking men around him". Diệm, who was known for his poor social skills, decided to have his sister-in-law serve as the unofficial First Lady of South Vietnam. Madame Nhu frequently talked to the Vietnamese, French and other foreign press quite candidly. Madame Nhu's marriage was unhappy as she wrote in her diary of an all consuming "rising desire" in her body, complained her husband had little interest in sex with her, and wrote with disgust of his affections for a younger woman whom she called that "creature" who was very "vulgar" and "dirty". Madame Nhu devoted her time to politics, championing a new Family Code she presented to parliament in October 1957 and passed in June 1958 to replace the old French code that banned concubinage and polygamy; allowed women to open bank accounts and own property; and required that daughters be given greater inheritance rights.

In 1962, she had a statue erected in Saigon to the memory of the Trưng Sisters, with the facial features modelled on herself, and also established the Women's Solidarity Movement, a female paramilitary organization. The statue cost US$20,000, a substantial sum at the time, given that South Vietnam was a developing country, but she was undeterred by criticism about largesse. She pressured the wives of ARVN officers and public servants into joining her "movement". A flamboyant woman, Madame Nhu took to flashing around her handgun in public, and the Women's Solidarity Movement was intended to allow Vietnamese women to participate in the fight against the Viet Cong, just as the Trưng sisters had fought against the Chinese, but most of the women who joined the movement were upper-class women who believed that their husbands would benefit by being given government jobs.

Her father became the ambassador to the United States while her mother was South Vietnam's observer at the United Nations. Two of her uncles were cabinet ministers.

Her parents resigned from their posts in 1963, in protest over the treatment of Buddhists under the regime of President Diệm and disowned their daughter.

Howard Jones says "Madame Nhu was chauffeured in a black Mercedes and wore a small diamond crucifix", and "wore form-fitting apparel so tight that one French correspondent suggestively described her as 'molded into her ... dress like a dagger in its sheath.' On formal occasions, she wore red satin pantaloons with three vertical pleats, which was the mark of the highest-ranking women of the imperial court in ancient Annam." When Diệm once criticized her collarless apparel, she snapped: "It's not your neck that sticks out, it's mine, so shut up."

== Advocacy ==
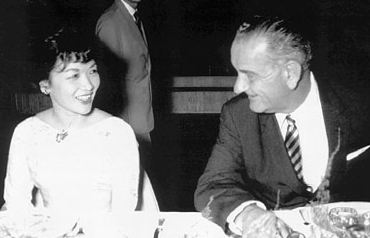
Madame Nhu, wearing her signature áo dài, and then-Vice President Lyndon B. Johnson in May 1961.

During her brother-in-law's presidency, Madame Nhu pushed for the passing of "morality laws" outlawing abortion, adultery, divorce, contraceptives, dance halls, beauty pageants, boxing and animal fighting, and closed down all brothels and opium dens. She was widely mocked by the public who regarded her as a hypocrite, with some considering the boat neck áo dài she played a major role in creating to be sexually suggestive and therefore inappropriate. Her family received further scorn as her sister Trần Lệ Chi, who was married to Nguyễn Hữu Châu, had a French lover named Étienne Oggeri, and critics alleged that Madame Nhu introduced the "morality laws" so that her sister's husband could not get a divorce. Since Châu was also wealthy, the Ngô family would have lost highly valuable assets. In addition, her brother, Khiêm, used his government connections to bilk rich entrepreneurs. Diệm had stated before becoming president, "The history of China bears witness to the grave crises brought on by the empresses and their relatives." The Diệm regime tended to favor giving high positions to Roman Catholics, which alienated the Buddhist majority over time.

Madame Nhu exerted influence with her fiery attitude, often abusing Diệm and Nhu, who bowed to her angry tirades. Madame Nhu was frequently mocked by the media for her ostentatious flaunting of power, and was sometimes called the "Dragon Lady", as well as "Lucretia Borgia" and "The Queen Bee". She once stated "Power is wonderful. Total power is totally wonderful." In Vietnam, Madame Nhu was called the Tiger Lady as dragons are considered lucky and benevolent (mythical) animals in Vietnamese culture that are the wise and kindly friends of humanity, whereas the tiger is considered a symbol of ferocity, and many Vietnamese found the term "Dragon Lady" mystifying and insulting. She once told a group of American congressmen, "I'm not exactly afraid of death. I love power and in the next life I have a chance to be even more powerful than I am. U.S. Defense Secretary McNamara noted that "I saw Madame Nhu as bright, forceful, and beautiful, but also diabolical and scheming—a true sorceress."

She had a message to Diệm's opponents: "We will track down, neutralize and extirpate all these scabby sheep." French journalist François Sully wrote that Madame Nhu was "conceited, and obsessed with a drive for power that far surpasses that of even her husband ... It is no exaggeration to say that Madame Nhu is the most detested personality in South Vietnam." Sully was promptly expelled from Vietnam by the Ngô family.

Madame Nhu claimed that she and her husband were responsible for Diệm's triumph over the Bình Xuyên in the Battle for Saigon in 1954. She claimed it was the family's destiny to save South Vietnam. Following the collapse of the coup, her influence in the family began to rise.

As her husband's influence grew, as did her own vicariously, so did American distaste for them. Wesley Fishel, the anti-Communist academic from Michigan State University who had led an advisory group that helped to train Vietnamese public servants and who had lobbied American politicians in the 1950s to support Diệm's bid for power, resigned along with his staff. Fishel called Madame Nhu "Brilliant, vivacious, bitchy and brutal in her Borgia-like fashion", claiming that she and her husband were evil influences corrupting the regime.

She often exerted her influence through bouts of shouting. Sometimes when she disagreed with a proposal or decision that had been made inside the palace by some ministers or other senior public servants, she would verbally abuse them and intimidate them into adopting her preferred stance.

On 27 February 1962, two dissident Republic of Vietnam Air Force pilots, Nguyễn Văn Cử and Phạm Phú Quốc, bombed the Independence Palace, the official residence of the Ngô family, with the aim of assassinating them. One bomb landed in a room where Diệm was reading, but failed to detonate. The family escaped to the cellar unhurt, except for Madame Nhu, who sustained an arm fracture while running for cover.

Diệm reacted to the bombing by cracking down on political dissidents and further tightening control of the press. Madame Nhu added, "[y]ou open a window to let in light and air, not bullets. We want freedom, but we don't want to be exploited by it." In a radio interview in late 1962, she mockingly remarked that American journalists were "intoxicated with communism".

The following year she instructed her Women's Solidarity Movement to oppose American attempts "to make lackeys of Vietnamese and to seduce Vietnamese women into decadent paths." As relations became strained, she publicly accused the Americans of having supported the 1960 coup.

== Buddhist crisis ==
On 8 May 1963, a series of celebrations were held by Buddhist priests all over South Vietnam to honor Buddhist holiday of Vesak, as 8 May was the 2,527th anniversary of the Buddha's birthday. The Catholic Diệm disapproved of Vesak, and ordered the police to put down the celebrations under a law which forbade religious symbols from being paraded in the streets. A series of clashes occurred all over South Vietnam as the police sought to end the marches. When she heard that Diệm was to sign a statement offering compensation to the families of Buddhist protesters shot dead by the police of his brother Ngô Đình Cẩn, Nhu was reported to have thrown a bowl of soup at him. On 8 June 1963, Madame Nhu released a statement through the Women's Solidarity Movement accusing the Buddhists of neutralism, effectively accusing them of being communist collaborators. It then implored "bonzes of good faith" to stop helping the communists, otherwise Vietnamese Buddhism would be seen as a "small anti-nationalist branch of a dubious international association, exploited and controlled by communism and oriented to the sowing of the disorder of neutralism". She made another attack on the United States, calling on Diệm to "keep vigilance on all others, particularly those inclined to take Viet Nam for [a] satellite of [a] foreign power or organization." Madame Nhu publicly mocked Thích Quảng Đức, who performed a self-immolation on 11 June 1963 in a crowded Saigon street to protest against the shooting of Buddhists by Diệm's regime. She labelled it a "barbecue" and stated, "Let them burn and we shall clap our hands." She further offered to provide more fuel and matches for the Buddhists, noting the "barbecuing" was not "self-sufficient" because "imported gasoline" was used. The monk's suicide followed Ngô Đình Nhu's repression of the Buddhist-inspired protests and was responsible for the regime's continuing instability. According to historian Howard Jones, these comments "all but put the finishing touch on the Diệm regime".

Her own father went on radio to condemn her comments. A Confucian, Chương said that the regime had alienated "the strongest moral forces", implying that they had lost the Mandate of Heaven. She responded by calling him a "coward". Her mother said that "There is an old proverb in my country which means 'one should not make oneself or one's family naked before the world'... I was sick... Now, nobody can stop her ... She never listened to our advice." After these comments, the U.S. ambassador, Frederick Nolting, told Diệm that if he did not denounce his sister-in-law's comment in public, the U.S. would have to stop supporting him, but the president refused to do so, and assailed the monks. In an interview with David Halberstam, Madame Nhu said that it was "embarrassing to see people [Buddhist leaders] so uncultured claiming to be leaders". The U.S. embassy told Diệm that these comments violated an agreement between the Buddhists and his regime to avoid verbal exchanges, but Diệm refused to keep his family's end of the bargain, saying that his sister-in-law was obliged to expose "extremists" to keep the public informed. In July, the U.S. government rejected a request from her to travel to the United States for a public speaking tour, fearing a public relations disaster. On 3 August, she called the Buddhists "seditious elements who use the most odious Communist tactics to subvert the country."

This occurred after special forces loyal to the Ngôs raided the Xá Lợi Pagoda in Saigon in August. The pagoda was vandalized, monks beaten, and the cremated remains of Thích Quảng Đức, which included a heart which had not disintegrated, were confiscated. Simultaneous raids were carried out across the country, with the Từ Đàm Pagoda in Huế being looted, the statue of Gautama Buddha demolished, and the body of a deceased monk stolen. When the populace came to the defense of the monks, the resulting clashes saw 30 civilians killed and 200 wounded. Notably, President Diệm sent his sister-in-law a letter asking her not to talk in public about the clashes as her "barbecue" remarks had been a public relations disaster for his regime, both at home and abroad. Through her paramilitary organization, Madame Nhu claimed that the Buddhists were "controlled by communism" and that they were manipulated by the Americans, calling on Diệm to "expel all foreign agitators whether they wear monks' robes or not". A few days after the raids, Madame Nhu described the deadly attacks on the Buddhists as "the happiest day in my life since we crushed the Bình Xuyên in 1955", and assailed them as "communists".

The United States, in a position of some leverage owing to the considerable U.S. aid flowing into South Vietnam, in August 1963 wished to give President Diệm a chance to rid himself of both his brother and Madame Nhu. In a cable drafted by Assistant Secretary of State for Far Eastern Affairs, Roger Hilsman, to Ambassador Henry Cabot Lodge, Lodge was instructed to advise Diệm of a call for "the removal of the Nhus from the scene." U.S. President John F. Kennedy supported the message in the cable upon its approval by most of his advisors.

Her comments further stoked open infighting with her parents, who would eventually disown her and seek refuge in the United States. Her father, Trần Văn Chương, the ambassador to the United States, resigned in protest, along with all but one of the staffers at the embassy. Chương charged Diệm with having "copied the tactics of totalitarian regimes". His wife, who was South Vietnam's observer at the United Nations, resigned and spoke of mass executions and a reign of terror under Diệm and Nhu. She predicted that if Diệm, Nhu, and Madame Nhu did not leave Vietnam, then they would inevitably be killed. Madame Nhu claimed Buddhist leader Thích Trí Quang "spoke for many intellectuals who had repeatedly ridiculed her."

Following the pagoda raids, Trí Quang was given asylum at the U.S. Embassy after Ngô Đình Nhu's plans to assassinate him were uncovered. Madame Nhu gave a media interview in which she called on government troops to invade the American embassy and capture Thích Trí Quang and some other monks who were staying there, saying that the government must arrest "all key Buddhists". In a media interview, her husband responded to his parents-in-law by vowing to kill his father-in-law, claiming his wife would participate. He said "I will have his head cut off. I will hang him in the center of a square and let him dangle there. My wife will make the knot on the rope because she is proud of being a Vietnamese and she is a good patriot."

== Visiting the United States ==
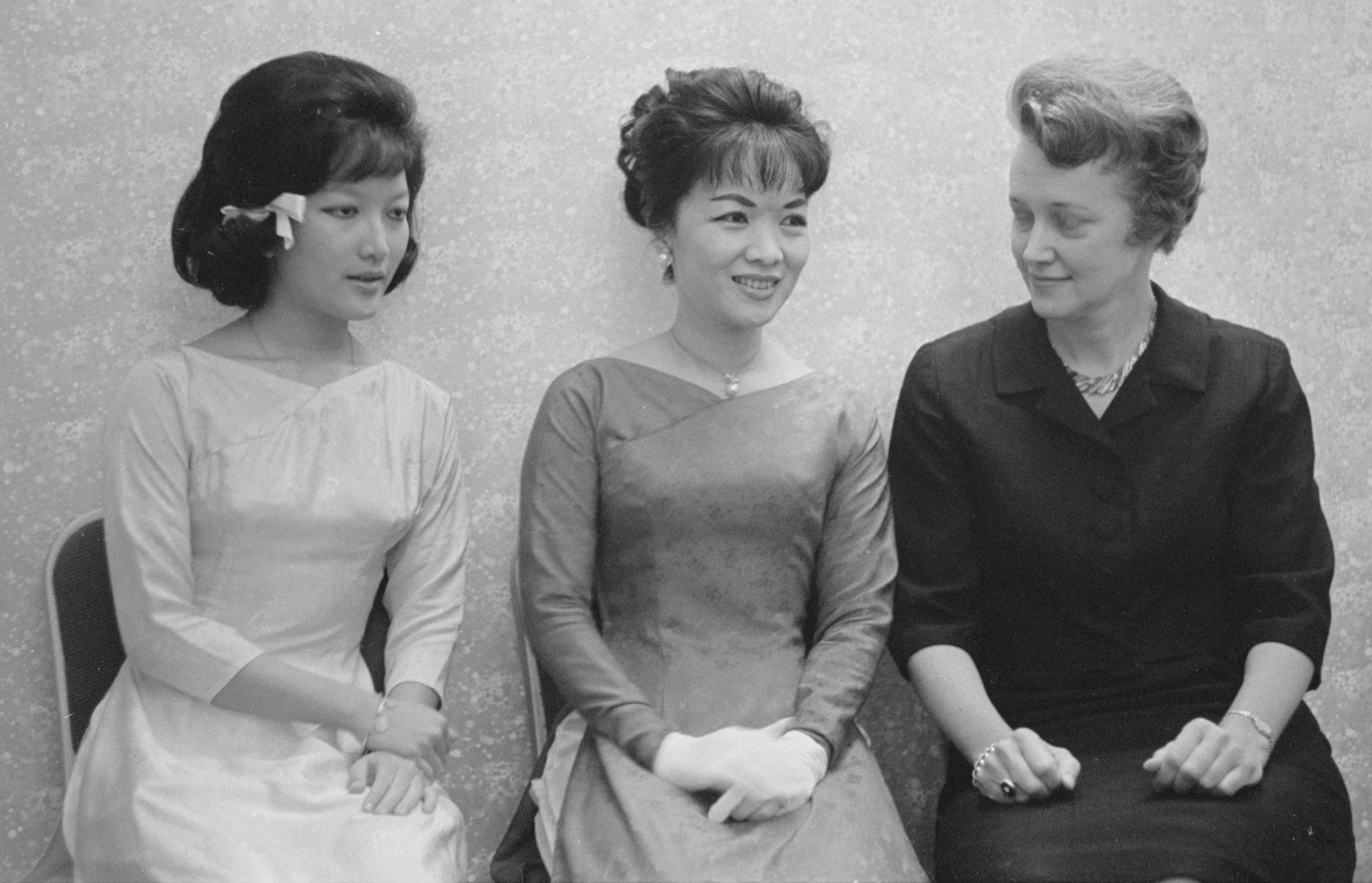
Madame Nhu (center) with her daughter Le Thuy (left) and Frances Lewine (right), before speaking at the Women's National Press Club at the Statler Hilton Hotel

When acting U.S. ambassador William Trueheart warned that development aid might be withheld if the repression orchestrated by the Ngôs continued, Madame Nhu denounced it as blackmail. Nhu and Diệm, fearing a cut in aid, sent Madame Nhu to the United States on a speaking tour. She departed South Vietnam on 9 September 1963 in an expedition that brought widespread international scorn to her family's regime. She had predicted "a triumphant lecture tour". She left on 17 September for the Inter-Parliamentary Union meeting in Yugoslavia, followed by a trip to Italy and possibly to the United States, where she had an invitation to speak before the Overseas Press Club of New York.

Madame Nhu's comments were such that President John F. Kennedy became personally concerned. He asked his advisers to find means of having Diệm gag her. McGeorge Bundy thought her comments were so damaging that it would only be acceptable for Ngô Đình Diệm to remain in power if she were out of the picture. The National Security Council deemed her a threat to U.S. security, and told the then United States Ambassador to South Vietnam, Henry Cabot Lodge Jr. to seek her permanent removal from South Vietnam.

There was also speculation that she could turn up at the United Nations in New York and embarrass South Vietnam and the U.S. Bundy said in a meeting that "this was the first time the world had been faced with collective madness in a ruling family since the days of the czars" and her comments provoked much debate on how to get Diệm to silence her.

In Madame Nhu's first destination, Belgrade, she said in an interview that "President Kennedy is a politician, and when he hears a loud opinion speaking in a certain way, he tries to appease it somehow", referring to the opposition to her family's rule. She continued: "if that opinion is misinformed, the solution is not to bow to it, but the solution should be to inform."

=== McNamara–Taylor mission ===
The issue resulted in an awkward confrontation when U.S. Defense Secretary Robert McNamara and the Chairman of the Joint Chiefs of Staff, General Maxwell Taylor, traveled to Vietnam for a fact-finding mission known as the McNamara–Taylor mission about the progress of the war. One of the purposes of the mission was to achieve, in the words of President Kennedy, "a visible reduction in influence of Nhus, who are symbol to disaffected of all that they dislike in GVN [Government of (South) Vietnam]. This we think would require Nhus' departure from Saigon and preferably Vietnam at least for extended vacation."

On 29 September 1963 meeting with Diệm, McNamara bemoaned "the ill-advised and unfortunate declarations of Madame Nhu", who had described U.S. military advisors as "acting like little soldiers of fortune". McNamara said that such comments would damage bilateral military cooperation and deter American officers from helping the South Vietnamese forces. Lodge denounced the comments and said, "These men should be thanked, not insulted." However, one of his aides lost his composure and asked if "there were not something the government could do to shut her up." Diệm was stunned by the comments and retorted that "one cannot deny a lady the right to defend herself when she has been unjustly attacked", saying his sister-in-law was entitled to freedom of speech. But McNamara reinforced the point, noting to Diệm that "This is not satisfactory. The problems were real and serious. They had to be solved before the war could be won."

=== Arrival in the U.S. ===
Madame Nhu arrived in the United States on 7 October, and her arrival was greeted by the United Nations' launching of an inquiry into the repression of Buddhists in South Vietnam. Kennedy had resisted the temptation to deny her an entry visa and his administration soon came under a flurry of verbal attacks.

Despite U.S. Vice President Lyndon Johnson's advice for her to stop damaging relations with inappropriate rhetoric, Madame Nhu refused to back down, describing herself as a scapegoat for American shortcomings and failures. She went on to accuse the administration of betraying her family, saying "I refuse to play the role of an accomplice in an awful murder ... According to a few immature American junior officials—too imbued by a real but obsolete imperialist spirit, the Vietnamese regime is not puppet enough and must be liquidated." She accused the Americans of undermining South Vietnam through "briberies, threats and other means" to destroy her family because they "do not like" it. She further mocked Kennedy's entourage, asking why "all the people around President Kennedy are pink?"

She denounced American liberals as "worse than communists" and Buddhists as "hooligans in robes". Her father did not share the same beliefs and followed her around the country rebutting her comments, denouncing the "injustice and oppression" and stating that his daughter had "become unwittingly the greatest asset to the communists." She predicted that Buddhism would become extinct in Vietnam. The Oram Group, the Madison Avenue PR firm that had been hired to promote Diệm's image in the U.S. for $3,000 per month, ended its relationship with Diệm during Madame Nhu's visit under the grounds she had so badly damaged the image of the Diệm government in America that there was nothing that could be done to improve his image and a continued association was going to cost the Oram Group other clients. American journalists had discovered Madame Nhu was "unfortunately too beautiful to ignore" as a Kennedy administration staffer complained, and that it was easy to provoke her into saying something outrageous, causing a media circus to develop around her as she traveled across America.

In the wake of the tumultuous events, Madame Nhu appeared on NBC-TV's Meet the Press on 13 October 1963, defending her actions and those of the South Vietnamese government. "I don't know why you Americans dislike us ... Is it because the world is under a spell called liberalism? Your own public, here in America, is not as anti-Communistic as ours is in Vietnam. Americans talk about my husband and I leaving our native land permanently. Why should we do this? Where would we go? To say that 70 percent of my country's population is Buddhistic is absolutely true. My father, who was our ambassador to the United States until two months ago, has been against me since my childhood."

=== Kennedy assessment ===
Upon the assassination of the Diệm brothers, President Kennedy's feelings were expressed to close friend Paul "Red" Fay, Acting Secretary of the Navy. The circumstances which allowed the flow towards the elimination from South Vietnam of the Diệm regime, Kennedy held, were due to the active personality of Madame Nhu. The Secretary recalls the President's feelings and in an oral history interview gave volunteered paraphrase of the words addressed to him,

That goddamn bitch. She's responsible for the death of that kind man. You know, it's so totally unnecessary to have that kind man die because that bitch stuck her nose in and boiled up the whole situation down there.

== Downfall ==
On 2 November 1963, Diệm and Nhu were assassinated in a coup d'état led by General Dương Văn Minh (Armed Forces Council) with the understanding that the United States would not intervene. At the time of the assassinations, Madame Nhu was in Beverly Hills, California, traveling with her 18-year-old daughter, Ngô Đình Lệ Thủy. Her other children were in Vietnam at the family retreat in Đà Lạt and she feared that they would meet the same fate as their father. The children were not harmed by the generals and were flown out of the country into exile in Rome, where they were placed in the custody of their uncle, Archbishop Thục. Madame Nhu later flew to Rome to join them.

In response to the killings of Diệm and Nhu, she immediately accused the United States, saying "Whoever has the Americans as allies does not need enemies", and that "No coup can erupt without American incitement and backing". She went on to predict a bleak future for Vietnam and said that, by being involved in the coup, the troubles of the United States in Vietnam were just beginning. She called the deaths an "indelible stigma" against the U.S. and said "My family has been treacherously killed with either official or unofficial blessing of the American government, I can predict to you now that the story is only at its beginning". She invoked biblical analogies, saying "Judas has sold the Christ for thirty pieces of silver. The Ngô brothers have been sold for a few dollars". When asked if she wanted asylum in the United States, she said, "I cannot stay in a country whose government stabbed me in the back. I believe all the devils in hell are against us".

In the aftermath of the coup, the statues of the Trưng Sisters that Madame Nhu had erected with her own facial features were demolished by jubilant anti-Diệm rioters. The Times of Vietnam office was also burned down, and the newspaper was never published again.

== Life in exile ==
The military government of Vietnam under General Dương Văn Minh confiscated all of the property in Saigon that belonged to Madame Nhu and her family, and she was not allowed to return to South Vietnam. She went to Rome briefly before moving to France and later Italy, with her children. Her daughter, Lệ Thủy, died in 1967, at age 22, in a car accident in Longjumeau, France. Her younger daughter, Ngô Đình Lệ Quyên, who grew up to be an Italian-Vietnamese human rights lawyer, also died in a car accident in 2012.

In November 1982 Madame Nhu accorded a first significant interview on the historic events in Vietnam to Judith Vecchione in Rome. Vecchione was a producer for Vietnam: A Television History. The interview, one of at least two hundred and fifty-nine for the series, lasts a recorded fifty-two minutes but Madame Nhu's subjectivity was far from the hard facts demanded of the producers' intended content and barely two minutes of her observations found use. The series subsequently aired on PBS in 1983.

On 2 November 1986, Madame Nhu charged the United States with hounding her family during the arrest of her younger brother, Trần Văn Khiêm, who was charged in the strangling-deaths of their parents in their Washington, D.C., home after being cut out of their will.

In 1993, she sued her parents' insurance company to prevent it from awarding their death-benefit because she contested the validity of their wills. Her parents allegedly changed their wills, disinheriting their son Khiem and Madame Nhu and making their sister Le Chi the sole beneficiary.

In the 1990s, she was reportedly living on the French Riviera and charging the press for interviews. In 2002, she gave an interview to journalist Truong Phu Thu of Dân Chúa Mỹ Châu, a Vietnamese Catholic community publication. It was published in October 2004. The article stated that she was living in Paris and working on her memoirs.

In her last years, she lived with her eldest son, Ngô Đình Trác, and youngest daughter, Ngô Đình Lệ Quyên, in Rome, and was reportedly working on a book of memoirs to be published posthumously.

In early April 2011, she was taken to a hospital in Rome where she died three weeks later, on Easter Sunday, 24 April 2011.

== Books about Madame Nhu ==
- Finding the Dragon Lady: the Mystery of Vietnam's Madame Nhu, authored by Monique Brinson Demery
  (PublicAffairs Books, published September 2013). There is the significant claim upon this book that the author was ultimately entrusted with Madame Nhu's unpublished memoirs; and that additionally revealed to the author had been a diary presented as Madame Nhu's, from the years leading up to the coup, this having the only known provenance, a Vietnamese-American U.S. Army Captain James Văn Thạch.
- Trần Lệ Xuân Giấc Mộng Chính Trường (Vietnamese book)
- Đệ Nhất Phu Nhân Trần Lệ Xuân (Vietnamese book)
- La République du Viêt-Nam et les Ngô-Đình – written by the children of Madame Nhu, Ngô Đình Quynh and Ngô Đình Lệ Quyên, also family friend Madame Jacqueline Willemetz (French book)

== Influence on Vietnamese fashion ==
In the early 1960s, Madame Nhu popularized her own version of the traditional áo dài that was considered controversial in its day due to its tight fit and low-cut neckline. According to Boi Tran Huynh, a scholar of Vietnamese visual arts, "To foreigners, this collar made sense given the tropical conditions, but conservatives saw it as too suggestive for Vietnamese women."

== Children ==
- Ngô Đình Lệ Thủy was born in Hue in 1945. She died on 12 April 1967, in an automobile accident in Longjumeau, France.
- Ngô Đình Trác (son) was born in Dalat in 1949. He graduated with a degree in agricultural engineering, married an Italian woman, and had 4 children. He died in 2021 due to a stroke.
- Ngô Đình Quỳnh (son) was born in Dalat in 1952. He graduated from ESSEC (École supérieure des sciences économiques et commerciales), a private school training professionals in the economy; currently works as a trade representative for a U.S. company in Brussels, Belgium.
- Ngô Đình Lệ Quyên was born in Saigon in 1959. She received a PhD from the University of Rome. Lệ Quyên was a lawyer in the legal IT sector and was invited as a guest lecturer at presentations by Law Faculty of the University of Rome. She served as Commissioner of Immigration Caritas Europe. On 16 April 2012, she was killed in a traffic accident on the way to work in Rome.

Honorary titles
Preceded by Empress Nam Phương	First Lady of South Vietnam; 1955–63	Succeeded by Madame Nguyen Van Thieu (in 1967)
