= Khiêm Trần =

Khiêm Trần may refer to the following individuals:

- Trần Văn Khiêm, younger brother of Madame Ngô Ðình ('Madame Nhu'), former First Lady of South Vietnam
- Trần Thiện Khiêm, a South Vietnamese general
