= Mê Linh Square =

Square in Ho Chi Minh City, Vietnam

- City square
- Công trường Mê Linh
- Former name: Place Rigault de Genouilly
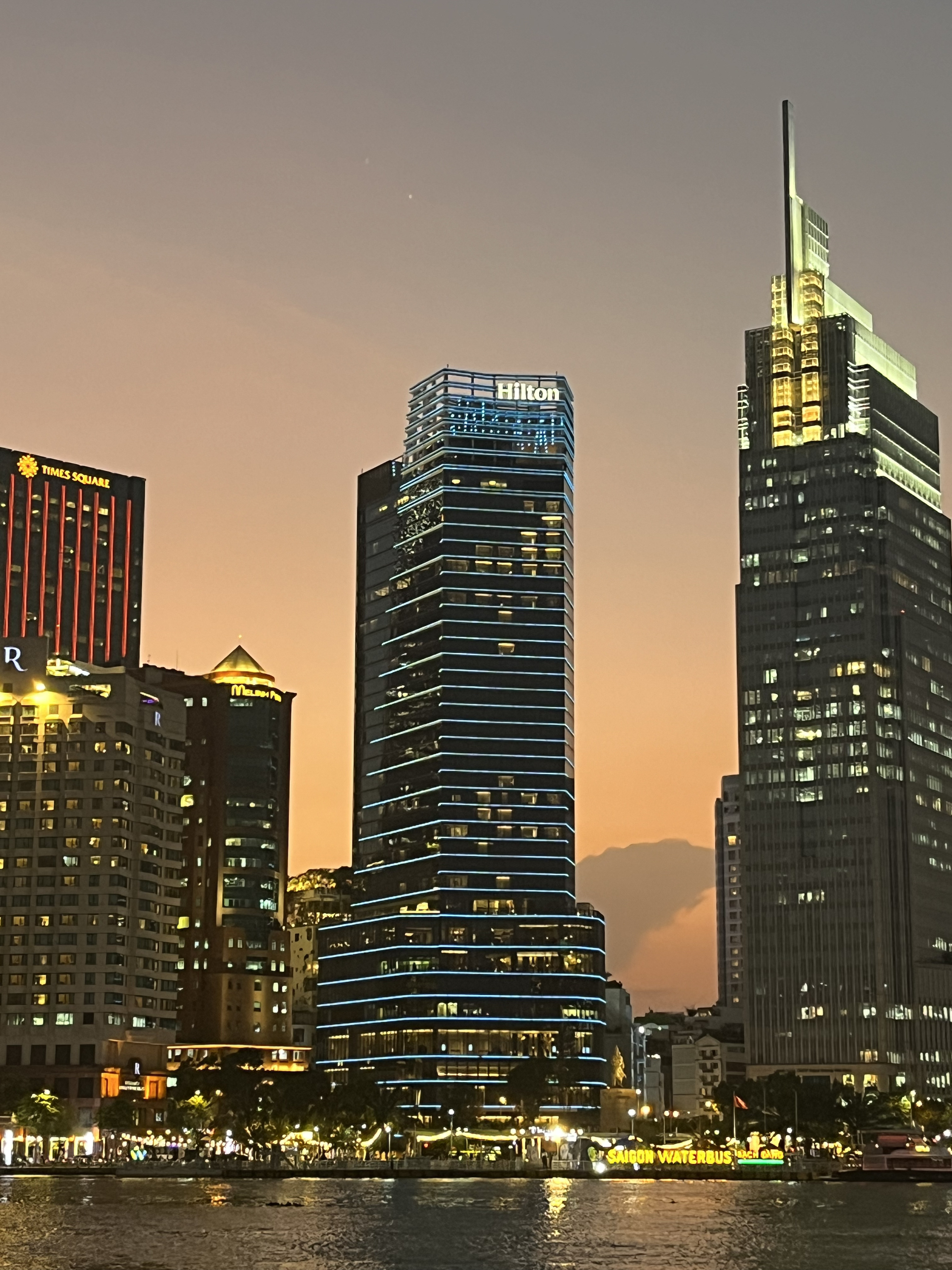
- Mê Linh Square in 2024
- Completed: 1962
- Dedicated to: Trưng Sisters & Trần Hưng Đạo (Note: The name Mê Linh Square is not related to Trần Hưng Đạo, but rather to the way his statue points towards Bạch Đằng Wharf Park on the Saigon River, commemorating the Battle of Battle of Bạch Đằng (1288) when he commanded the Đại Việt army and people in preparing a large ambush on the Bạch Đằng River, contributing to the victory over the Mongol invasions of Vietnam.)
- Owner: Ho Chi Minh City
- Location: Bạch Đằng Quay, Saigon, Ho Chi Minh City
- Interactive map of Mê Linh Square
- Coordinates: 10°46′31″N 106°42′23″E

Mê Linh Square (Vietnamese: Công trường Mê Linh) is a city square next to the Saigon River in Saigon ward, downtown Ho Chi Minh City, Vietnam. The square has a semi-circular shape and features a statue of Trần Hưng Đạo, it is separated from the Saigon River by the Bạch Đằng Quay.

== History ==
Prior to the square's original layout in 1863, its site was the junction of the quayside street and a historic road of Saigon that once ran through the old citadel (Thành Quy), which was named by the French as rue Impériale (1865), rue Nationale (1870), rue Paul Blanchy (1901), then Trưng Nữ Vương street and now is known as Hai Bà Trưng Street. According to scholar Vương Hồng Sển, the wharf opposite of the square was where the French naval ships anchored to capture Saigon in 1859.

Initially known as the "Rond-point", the square was planned to serve as a central point for the European city that was going to be built. By 1871, four other streets radiating from the square: rue Vannier, rue Turc, rue de Thu-Dau-Mot (Thủ Dầu Một) and rue de Yokohama (modern-day Ngô Đức Kế, Hồ Huấn Nghiệp, Thi Sách and Phan Văn Đạt, respectively) had also been opened, giving the area its present road layout.

On 17 February 1879, the occasion of the 20th anniversary of the capture of Saigon, the authorities inaugurated a bronze statue of Admiral Charles Rigault de Genouilly (1807–1873) by sculptor Alexandre-Victor Lequien (1822–1905) on the roundabout. This statue stood on a granite pedestal and was fenced off with golden-pointed railings, the Rond-point was henceforth known as place Rigault de Genouilly. The semi-circular open space of the square, in addition to the central roundabout where the Rigault de Genouilly statue stood, consisted of three surrounding gardens with two pyramid-shaped monuments placed on two of the three gardens. The first monument in the middle garden was relocated from its original position on the riverside at the end of rue Catinat. Its base read: « À Lamaille, le commerce saïgonnais reconnaissant » (translating to "To Lamaille with gratitude, Saigon merchants"). The second monument in the left garden was a memorial to Ernest Doudart de Lagrée (1823–1868), the naval officer and explorer who died in Yunnan in 1868 while leading the Mekong expedition. And just like the first monument, this one was reerrected. It was first erected on boulevard Charner, shortly after the Grand Canal was filled in. In 1890, it was relocated to boulevard Bonard but only stood there for a few years. Then in 1895, to make space for the Municipal Theatre, it was again relocated to place Rigault de Genouilly. Additionally, in 1891, the terminus of the steam tramway line from Saigon to Chợ Lớn was installed on the quayside opposite the square.

Following the August Revolution in 1945, the Rigault de Genouilly statue was abducted and scholar Vuong Hong Sen revealed that it was later melted down. In 1955, place Rigault de Genouilly was renamed Mê Linh Square by the South Vietnamese government, after the two Trưng sisters' home prefecture. In March 1962, Madame Nhu, as the head of the newly started Women's Solidarity Movement, erected a statue of the Trưng sisters at the square's center. The statue, cast by sculptor Nguyễn Văn Thế, portrayed the two sisters on a large three-legged pedestal, with one leg resembling an elephant trunk and the other two resembling the animal's legs. Mê Linh Square was also renovated with a pond added. However, the Trưng sisters' faces and figures were said to resemble Madame Nhu herself, and a rumor started that she had asked for the statue to be modeled after her own facial features. Consequently, after the coup d'état in November 1963, the anti-government crowd tore down the statue and rolled the broken-off head through the streets. The pedestal was then left empty until 1967, when the current statue of Trần Hưng Đạo, commissioned by the Republic of Vietnam Navy and cast by sculptor Phạm Thông, occupied the spot. During the third Mongol invasion of Đại Việt, Trần Hưng Đạo was the commander of the naval battle on the Bạch Đằng River which resulted in Đại Việt's victory, and thus the South Vietnamese Navy chose him as their patron saint. The statue depicts Trần Hưng Đạo standing with his left hand holding a sword and his right hand pointing across the Saigon River.

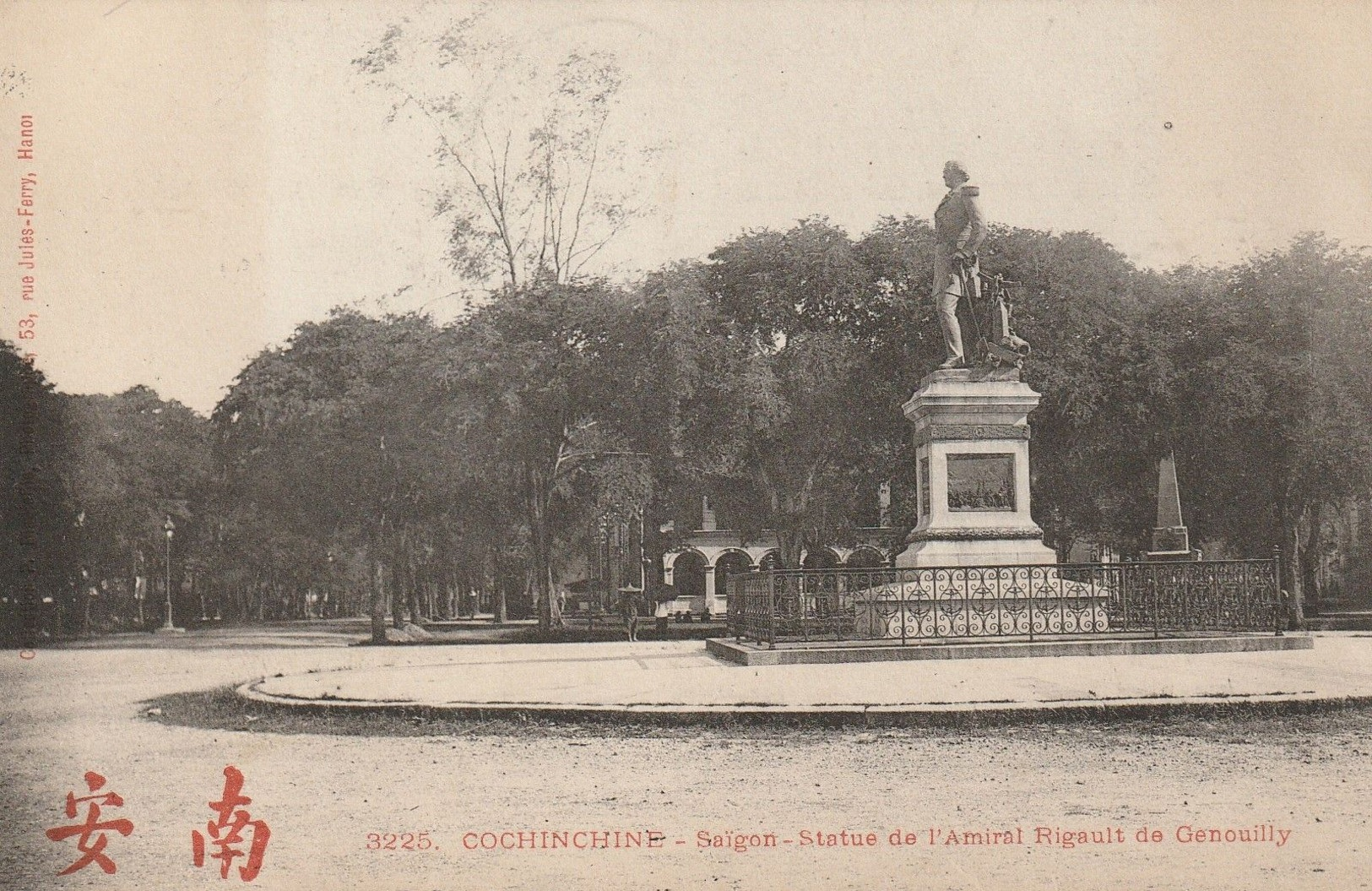
Statue of Rigault de Genouilly and the monument of Doudart de Lagrée in the background

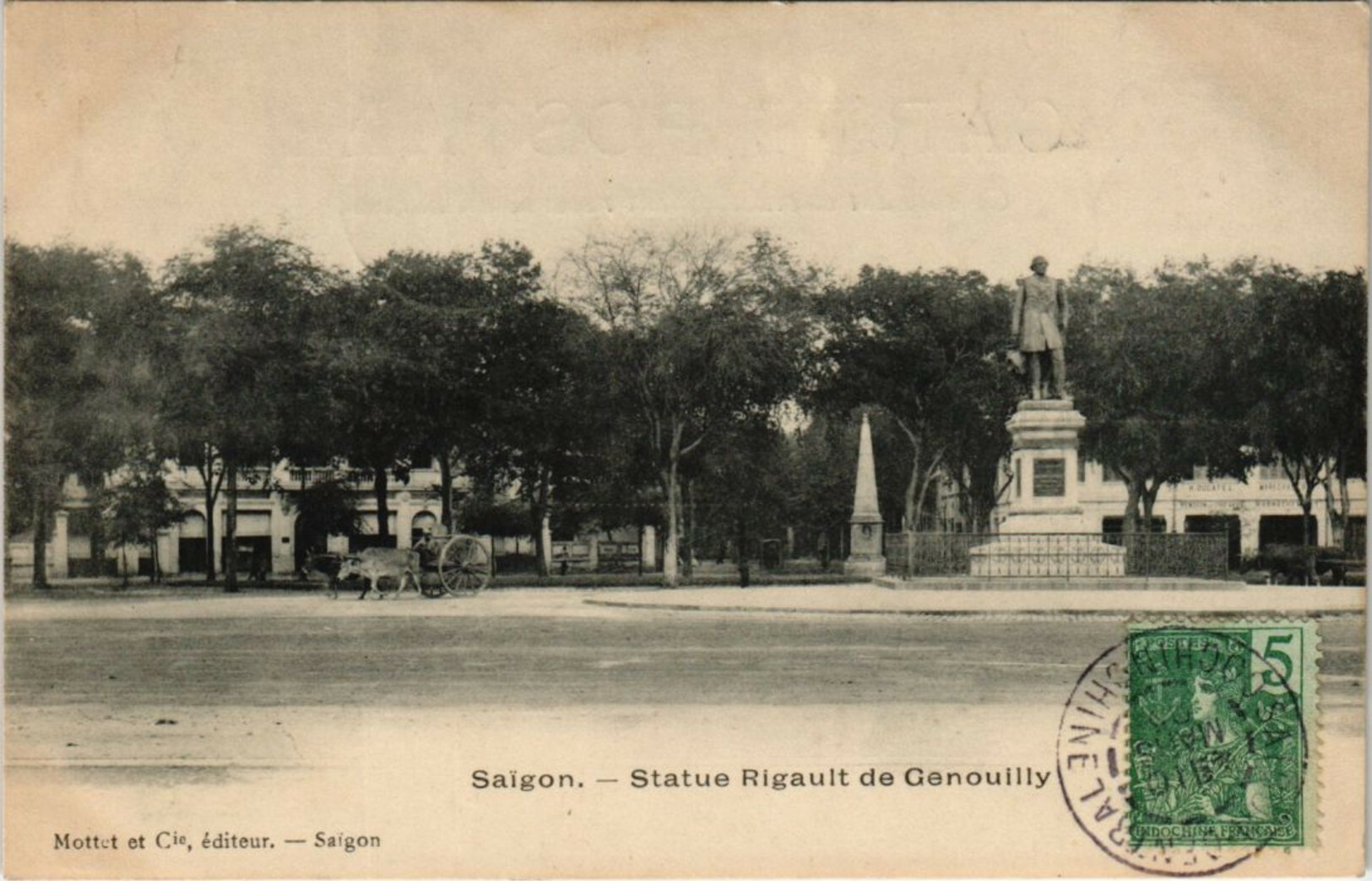
Another view of the Rigault de Genouilly statue and the Lamaille monument in the background

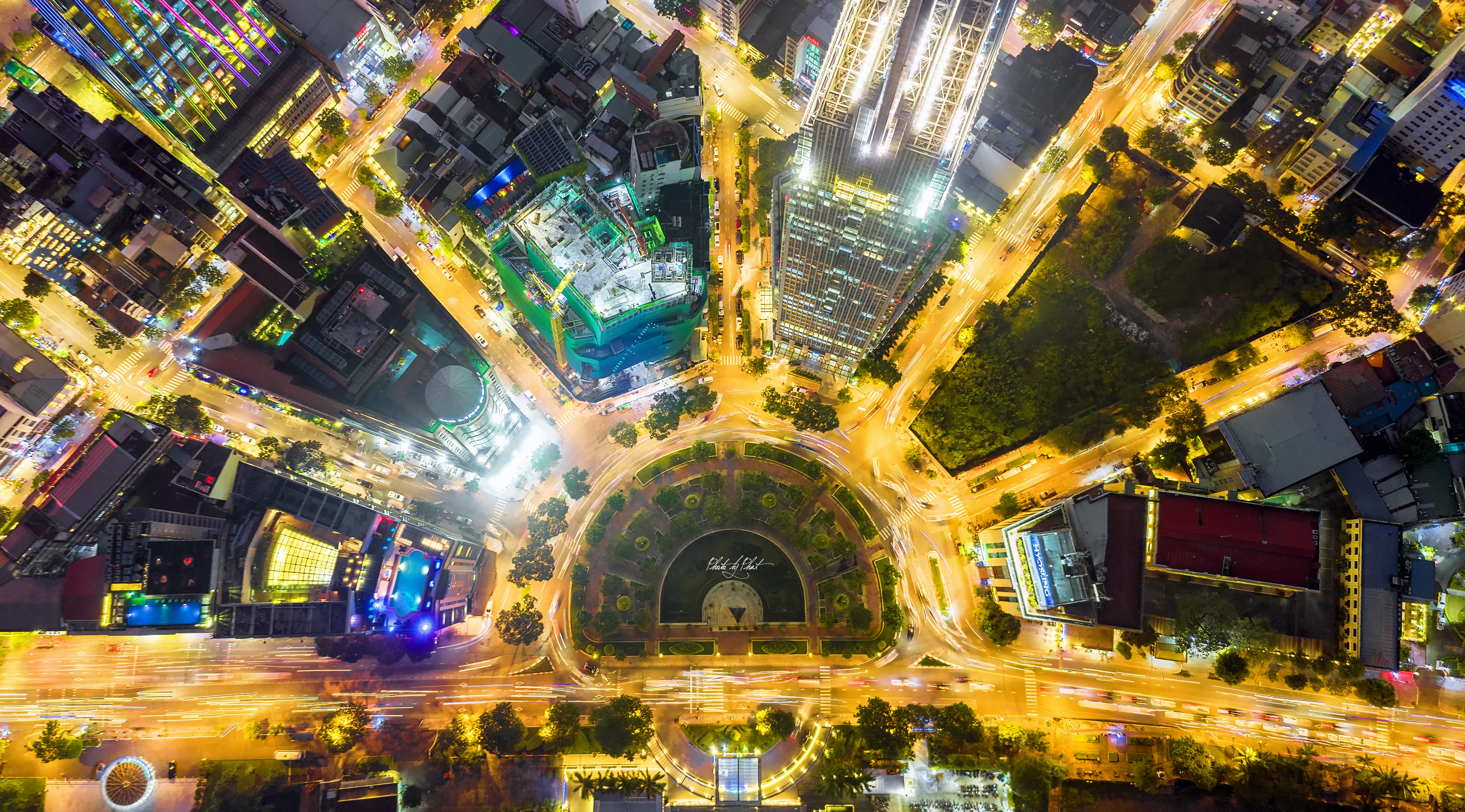
Me Linh Square viewed from above in 2019

== Buildings surround ==
Buildings located in the same block will be marked with corresponding characters from the buildings directly adjacent to the square.

=== Directly adjacent ===
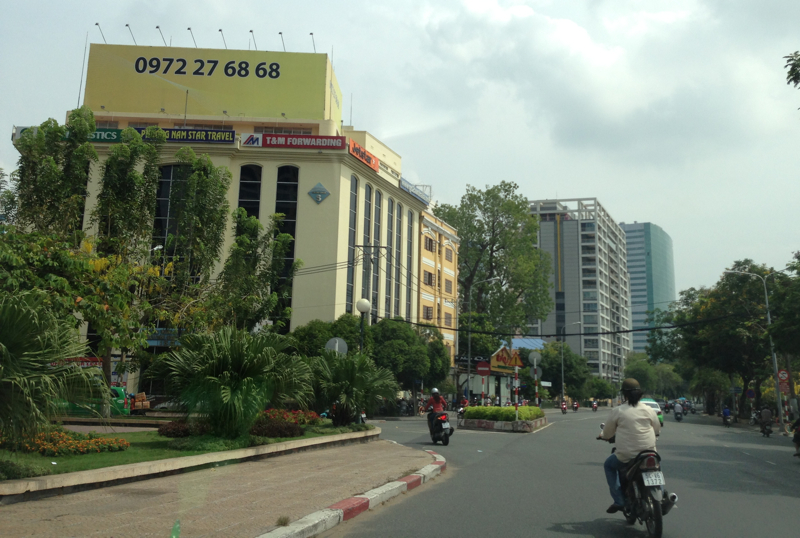
IBC Building: 1A Mê Linh Square

2–4–6 Hai Bà Trưng: No. 3 Mê Linh Square

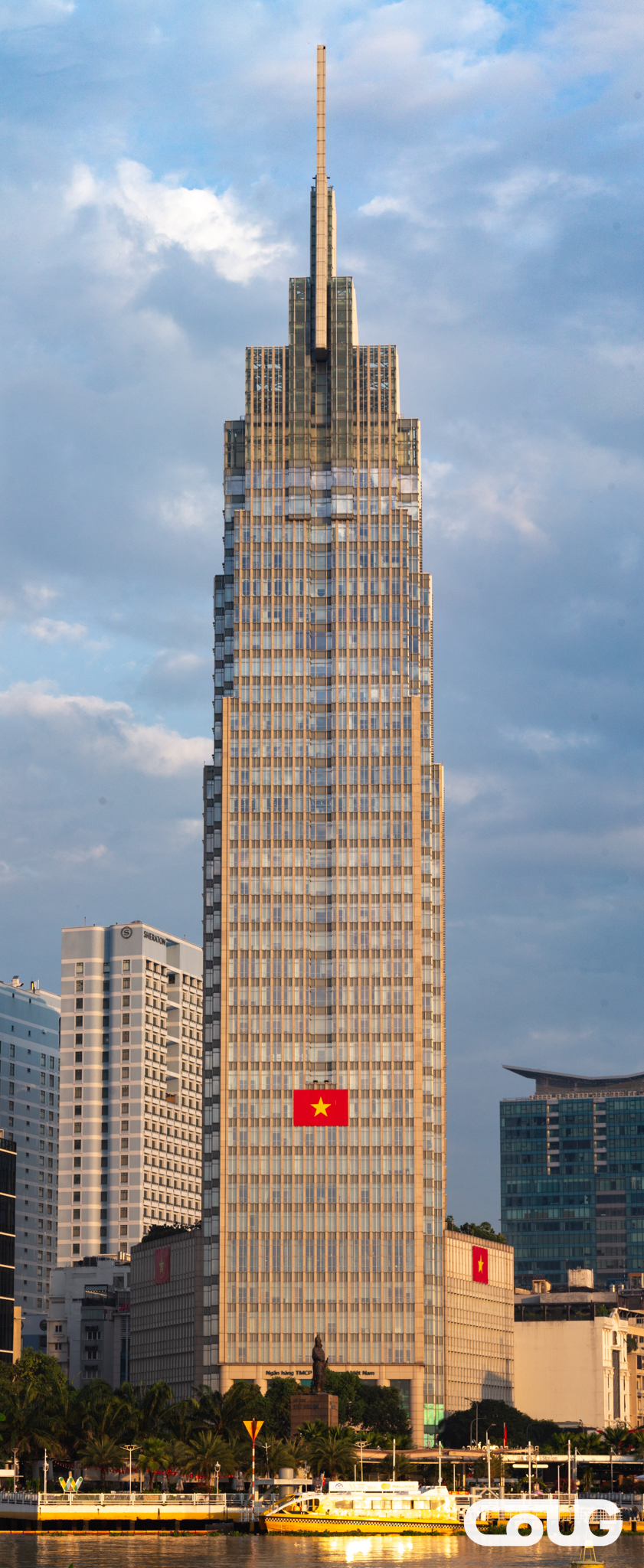
Vietcombank Tower: No. 5 Mê Linh Square

Hilton Saigon Hotel: 11 Mê Linh Square

Melinh Point Tower: No. 2 Ngô Đức Kế

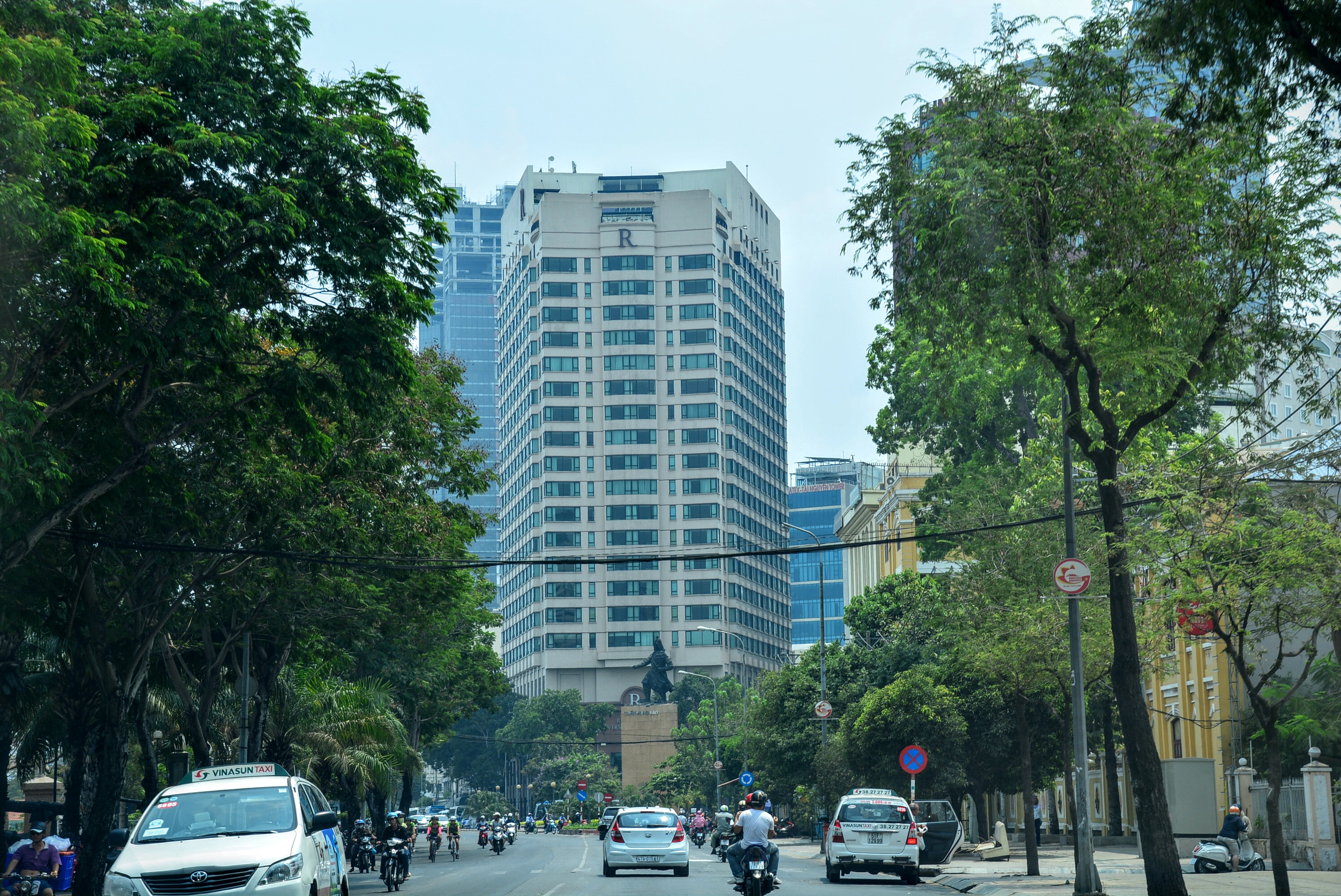
Renaissance Riverside Hotel Saigon: 8–9–10–11–12–13–14–15 Tôn Đức Thắng Blvd

=== Nearby ===
- Liberty Central Saigon Riverside Hotel (next to the Renaissance Riverside Saigon)
- Riverside Hotel
- Seaprodex 2–4–6 Đồng Khởi Building
- Grand Hotel Saigon vi (behind Melinh Point)
- The Myst Đồng Khởi Hotel (next to Hilton Saigon Hotel)
- Sport Hotel (next to Hilton Saigon Hotel)
- A25 Hotel
- Satra Đồng Khởi Building
- Hương Sen Annex Hotel (behind Vietcombank Tower)
- Phước Lộc Thọ Building
- Vietnam People's Naval Army Barracks (next to IBC Building)
- Tôn Đức Thắng Museum (next to IBC Building)
- Aquari Hotel
- Express by M Village Đông Du

== Gallery ==
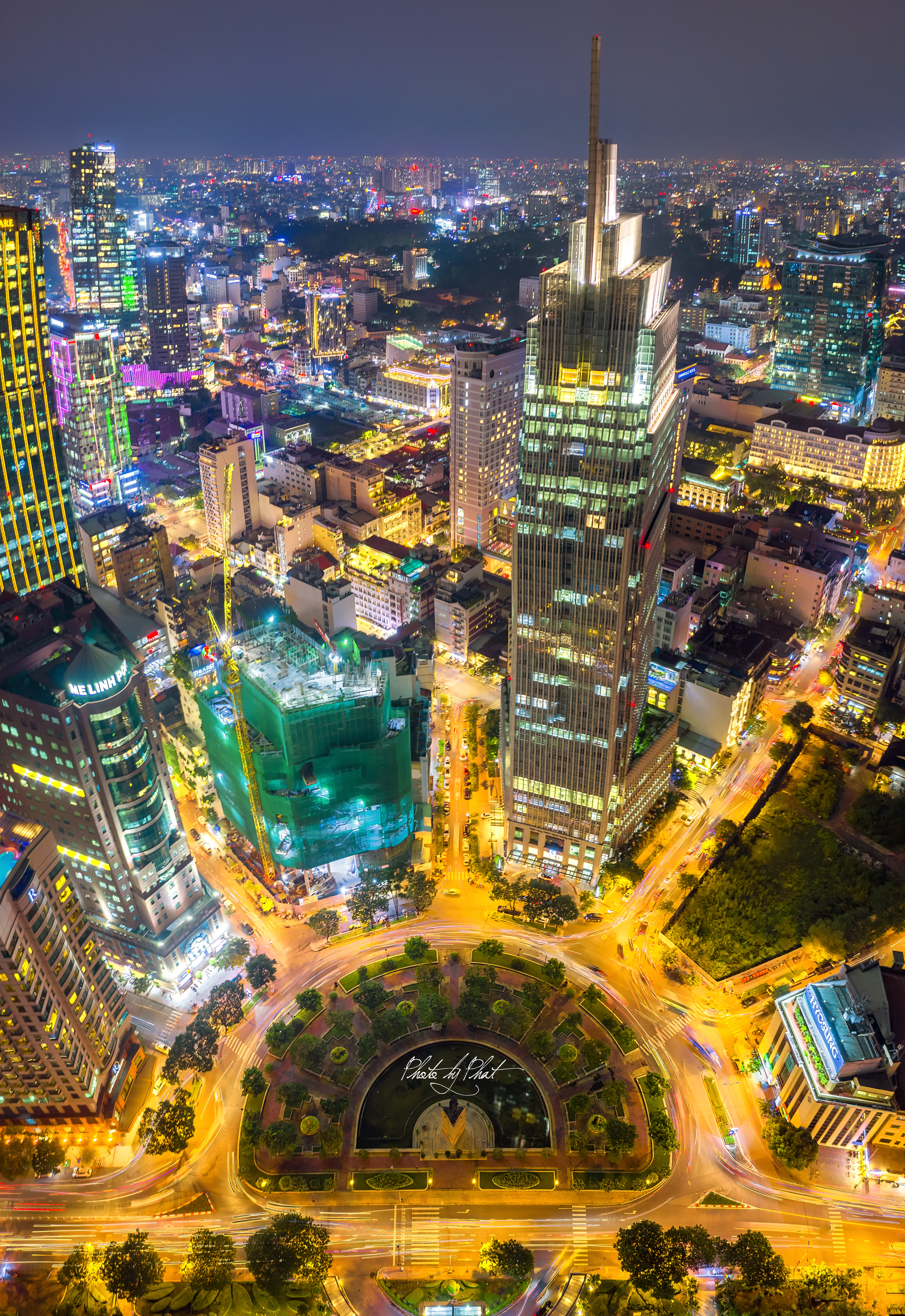
Mê Linh Square and surrounding area behind viewed from above

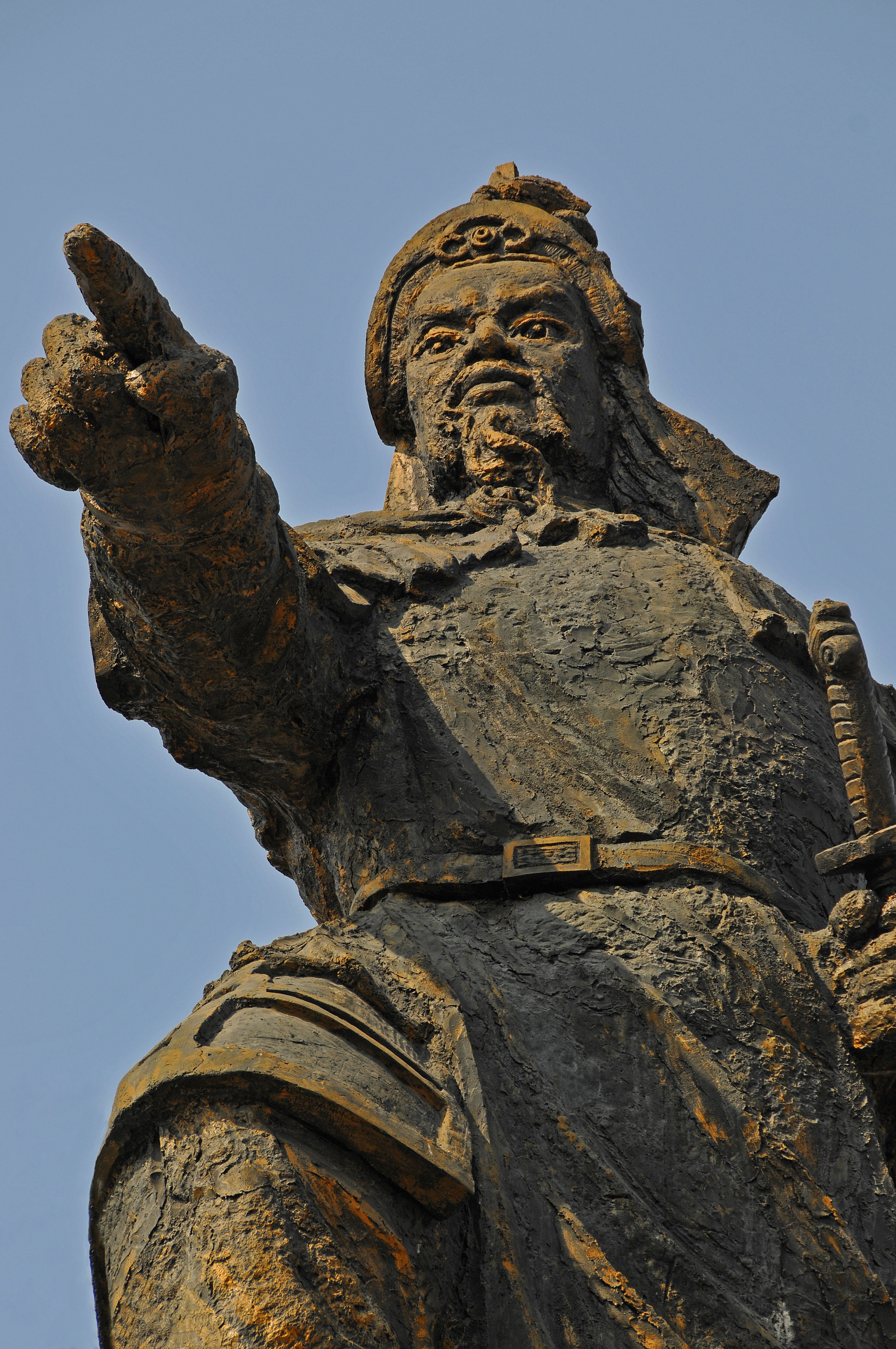
Closer look to statue of Trần Hưng Đạo

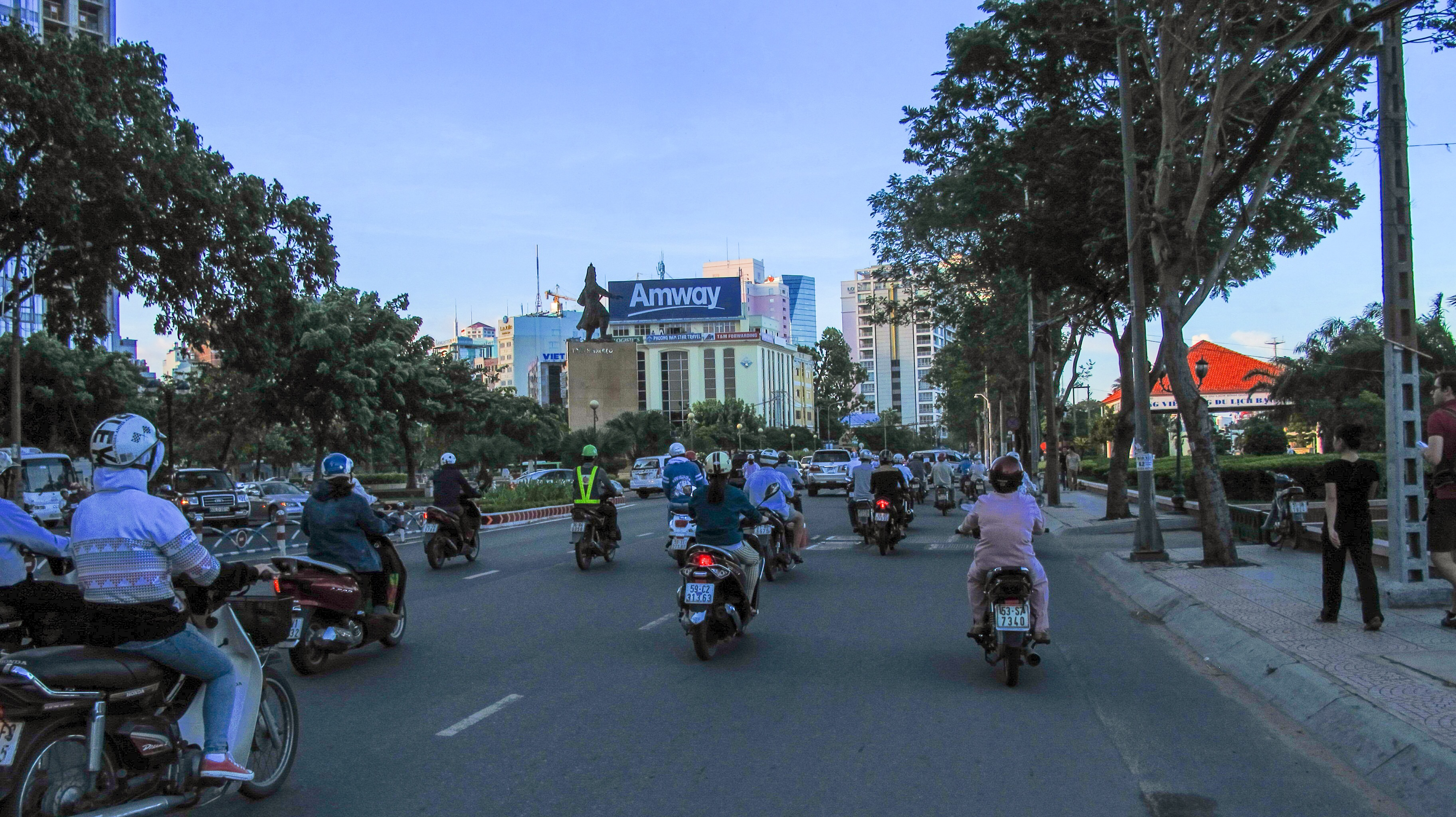
Trần Hưng Đạo Statue pointing to Bạch Đằng Quay

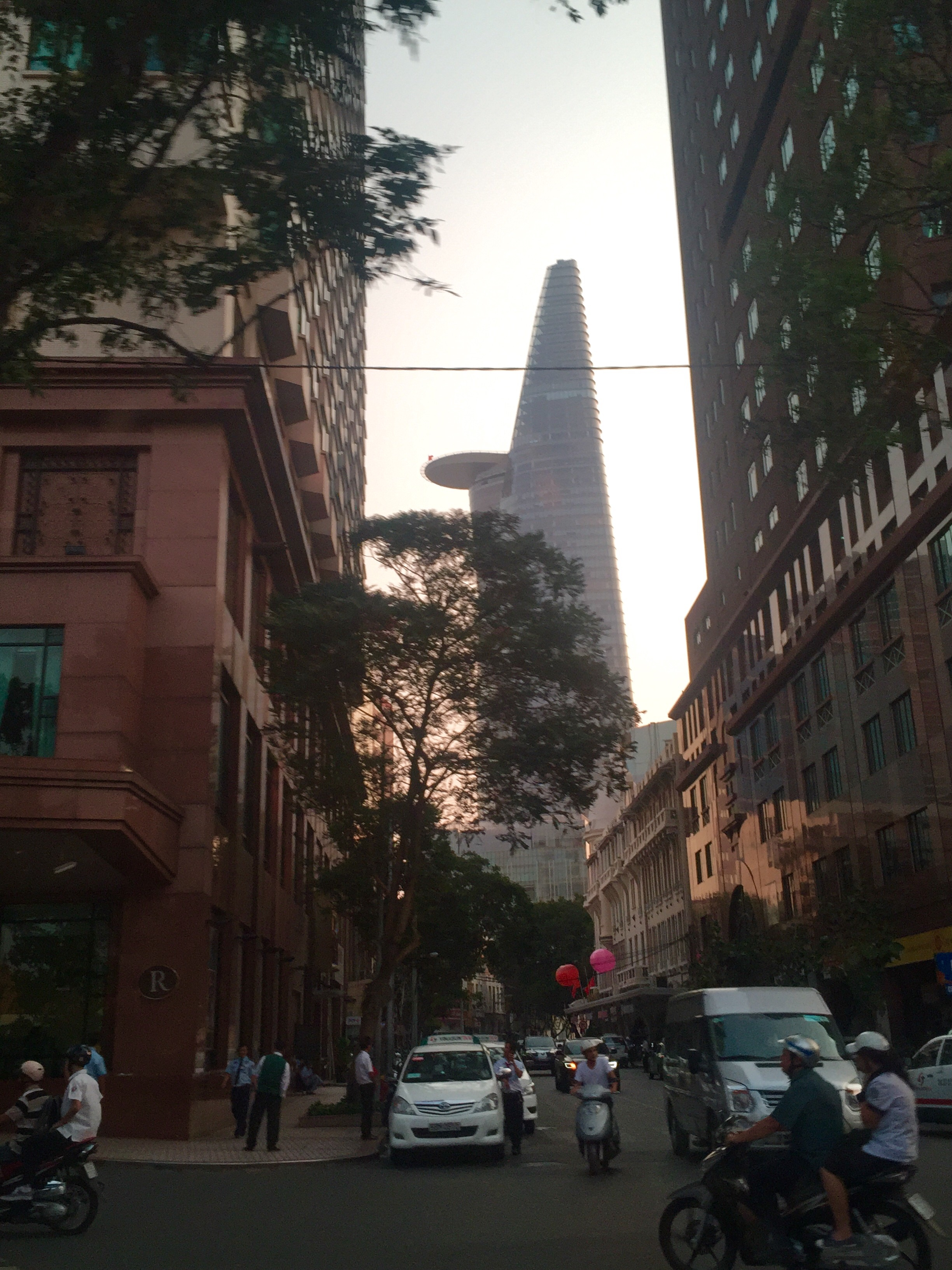
Ngô Đức Kế Street viewed from Mê Linh Square

Hồ Huấn Nghiệp Street viewed from Mê Linh Square

== See also ==
- Bạch Đằng Quay
