= Sabeco World Trade Center =

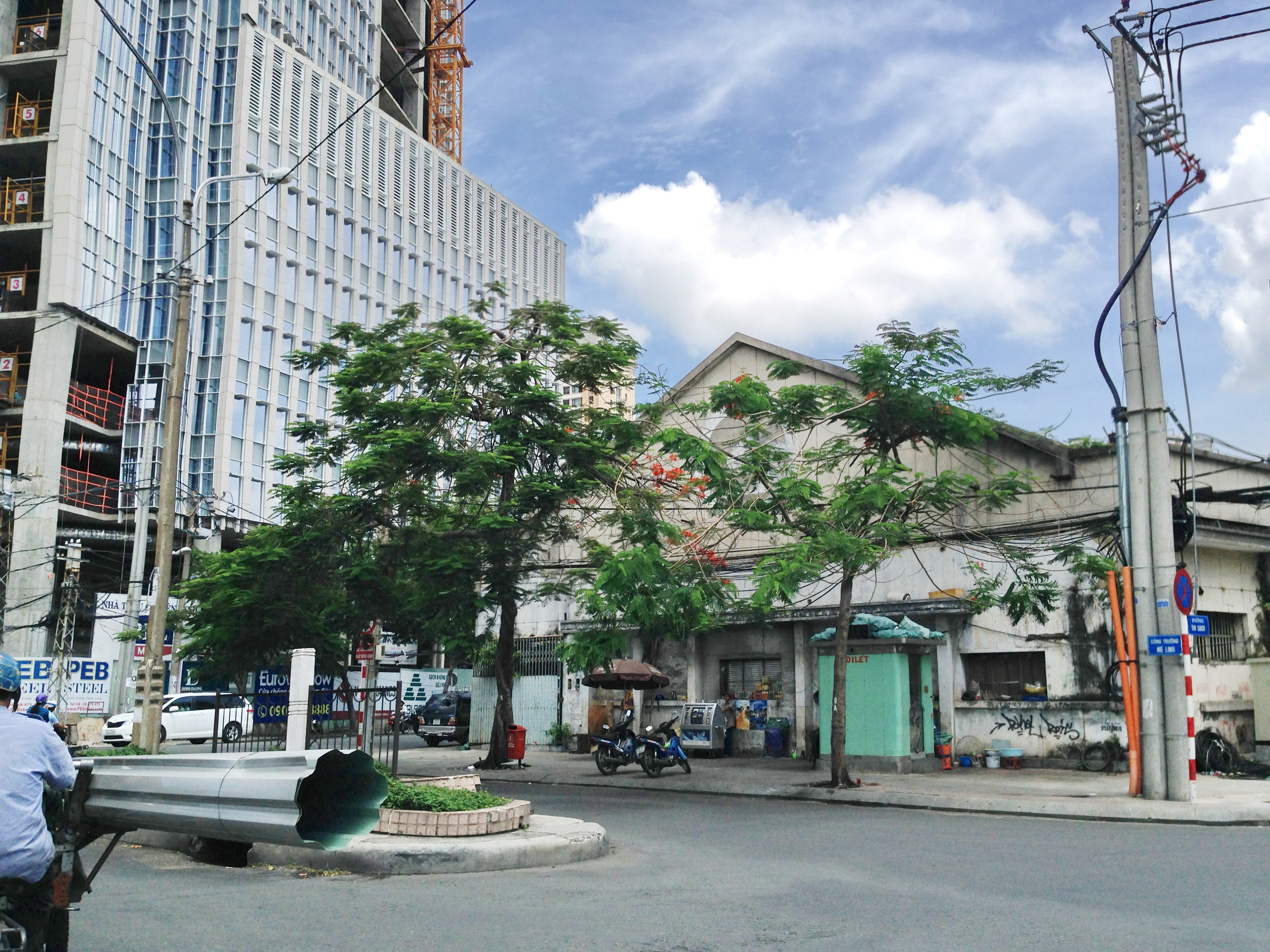
- The former building on the plot before being demolished
- Alternative names: Saigon Mê Linh Tower; Saigon Plaza; World Trade Center Ho Chi Minh City

General information
- Status: Never built
- Type: Hotel, Office, Shopping Mall, Convention hall
- Location: No. 3 Mê Linh Square, 2-4-6 Hai Ba Trung and 1-3-5 Thi Sách Street, Saigon, Ho Chi Minh City, Vietnam
- Coordinates: 10.776449938262125°N 106.70569803687381°E
- Construction started: 2010 (planned)
- Estimated completion: 2013 (planned)
- Owner: Sabeco Brewery

Height
- Top floor: 170.5 m (559 ft)

Technical details
- Floor count: 40

Design and construction
- Architect: HOK International (Asia Pacific) Ltd

Sabeco World Trade Center was the unofficial name of a proposed skyscraper at a block in Mê Linh Square, between the Vietcombank Tower and IBC Building with the address 2-4-6 Hai Ba Trung, District 1, Ho Chi Minh City, Vietnam. The project was developed by the Vietnam's beer producer Sabeco Brewery and planned to start construction in 2010 and complete in 2013; however, it was cancelled and never built. The tower was expected to have 40 floors, feature a traditional Vietnamese house, and become the ninth tallest building in Vietnam then. The architect for the project was HOK International. The development, known as Saigon Plaza, was planned to include offices, entertainment venues, shopping malls, a hotel, and a convention hall.

However, the project was canceled due to many controversies surrounding it and now is temporarily used by Rạn Biển City Center Restaurant while waiting for re-auction.

== Name ==
The name “World Trade Center” is a trademark owned by the World Trade Centers Association (WTCA) and is used under license by WTCA's global network of members in nearly 100 countries. The Sabeco project was not licensed or authorized by WTCA.

== Background: Market Growth in Vietnam ==
During 2000–2007, Vietnam experienced economic growth of 8-8.5%, leading to increased demand for office and shopping spaces in major cities like Ho Chi Minh City, Hanoi, Danang, and Haiphong. Land and housing prices in these cities are disproportionate to the country's GDP per capita.

== See also ==
- Tallest buildings in Vietnam
- List of World Trade Centers
