= Madame Nguyễn Văn Thiệu =

First Lady of South Vietnam from 1967 to 1975

Nguyễn Thị Mai Anh
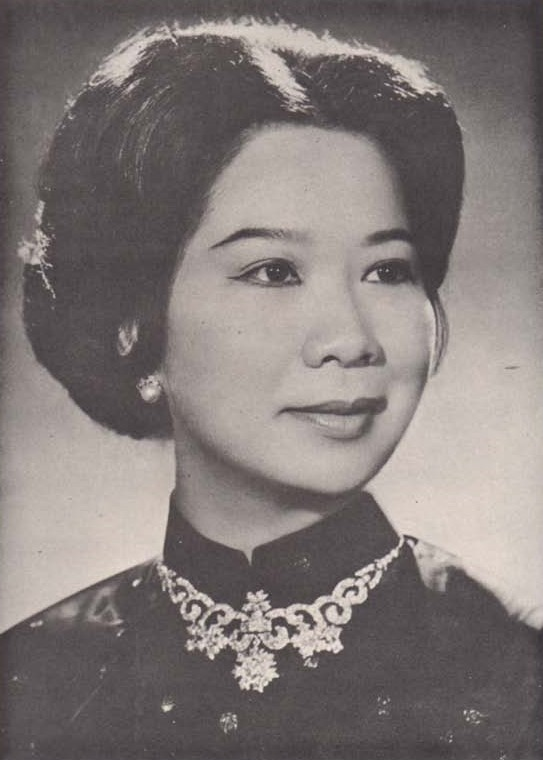
- Official portrait, 1970

First Lady of South Vietnam
- In role 31 October 1967 – 21 April 1975
- President: Nguyễn Văn Thiệu
- Preceded by: Trần Lệ Xuân
- Succeeded by: Lưu Thị Triệu

Personal details
- Born: 20 June 1930 Mỹ Tho, Định Tường province, French Cochinchina
- Died: 15 October 2021 (aged 91) San Diego County, California, U.S.
- Spouse: Nguyễn Văn Thiệu (m. 1951; died 2001)
- Children: Nguyễn Thị Tuấn Anh (daughter); Nguyễn Quang Lộc (son); Nguyễn Thiệu Long (son)
- Relatives: Đặng Văn Quang (uncle)

Nguyễn Thị Mai Anh (20 June 1930 – 15 October 2021), commonly known as Madame Nguyễn Văn Thiệu (Vietnamese: Phu nhân Tổng thống Thiệu), served as First Lady of South Vietnam (Vietnamese: Nhất phẩm Phu nhân) from 1967 to 1975.

She was the wife of Nguyễn Văn Thiệu, a Vietnamese general and politician, who served as President of the Republic of Vietnam from 1967 until his resignation in 1975.

== Biography ==
=== Early life ===
Nguyễn Thị Mai Anh was born on June 20, 1930, in Mỹ Tho town, with saint's name of Christine, the seventh of ten children in a Catholic family. As her family were wealthy herbal medicine practitioners, she was greatly influenced by the feudal order and family especially in the way she treated people.

In her youth, she and her sister, Tám Hảo, often went to Saigon to study and visit relatives. Due to the family's acquaintance with pharmacist Huynh Van Xuan, who worked at the Trang Hai Apothecary Institute, the two sisters worked as pharmacists at the Roussell Apothecary Institute. Huynh Van Xuan worked as a matchmaker for Nguyễn Văn Thiệu. Mai Anh's uncle, Đặng Văn Quang, was in Đà Lạt with Thieu, so the relationship was quickly promoted. There were some obstacles because Mai Anh was a Catholic, while Thiệu was Buddhist. They officially wed in 1951. In 1958, Thiệu was baptized as a Catholic. Mai Anh and Thiệu had three children: two sons (Nguyễn Quang Lộc, Nguyễn Thiệu Long) and daughter (Nguyễn Thị Tuấn Anh).

=== First Lady of South Vietnam ===
From 1967 to 1975, her husband reached the peak of power. Unlike First Lady Trần Lệ Xuân, she did not participate in politics at all, but rather engaged in social activities. In 1972, an American working in Vietnam asked for permission to take the name of Mrs. Nguyễn Thi Mai Anh for an orchid Brassolaeliocattleya Mai Anh.

In 1969, she established the Women's Volunteer Service Organization (Note: Hội Phụ-nữ Phụng-sự Xã-hội) and called for donations to build an infirmary for lower and working class people to be treated completely free. The For-People Hospital was inaugurated at the end of 1971. The contemporary press identified it as the most modern hospital in the whole of Southeast Asia. However, after the Fall of Saigon, it has been expropriated to treat high-ranking officials by the new regime. Folks wrote satiric at verse it as "For-Official" hospital (Note: Bệnh-viện Vì-Quan-Chức). Today it is called officially as the Unification Hospital.

A person who served in the Independence Palace under President Nguyễn Văn Thiệu commented that :

I have always held a fondness for the President Madam. She always kept the simple lifestyle of a kind and tolerant woman of the Mekong Delta. To me, Mrs. Thiệu is more of a mother and a brave wife than a First Lady living in the pinnacle of power and luxury. She is typical of the type of woman who grew up in a family fully absorbed a Confucian education (although she is a Catholic) that we often see in Southern society in the 40s. Ms. Thiệu always radiate clarity and joy. She never questioned the behavior of subordinates. Every time we met, she always asked us about our health first, not having time for us to greet her. The special thing is that she never mentioned anything related to Mr. Thiệu's work with us. During my time working here, only once did I hear her complain to Mr. Thiệu in very mild words about a powerful figure at the Presidential Palace while I was standing beside him.

=== Later life ===
Prior to the Fall of Saigon, President Thiệu announced his resignation on television. The family left South Vietnam on 21 April 1975 for Taiwan. They later moved to London before settling in Boston, Massachusetts. Nguyễn Văn Thiệu died on 29 September 2001 of a stroke in the aftermath of the September 11 attacks.

Madame Thiệu died on Friday, October 15, 2021, at her own residence in San Diego County, California.

== Awards ==
- Honorary Recipient of the Grand Order of Mugunghwa (South Korea, 1969)
- Special Grand Cordon of the Order of Propitious Clouds (Taiwan, 1969)

== Memoirs ==
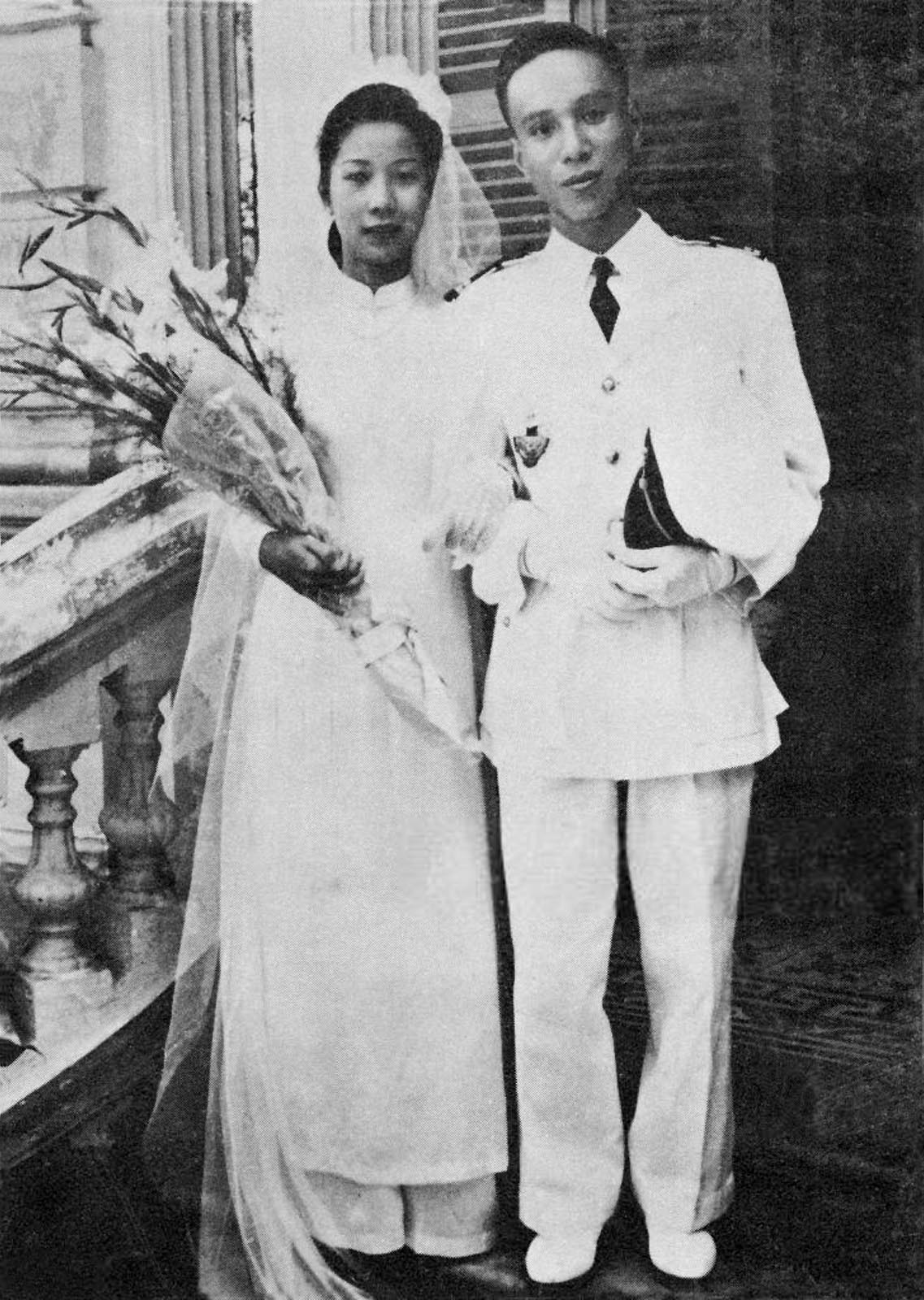
1951 marriage

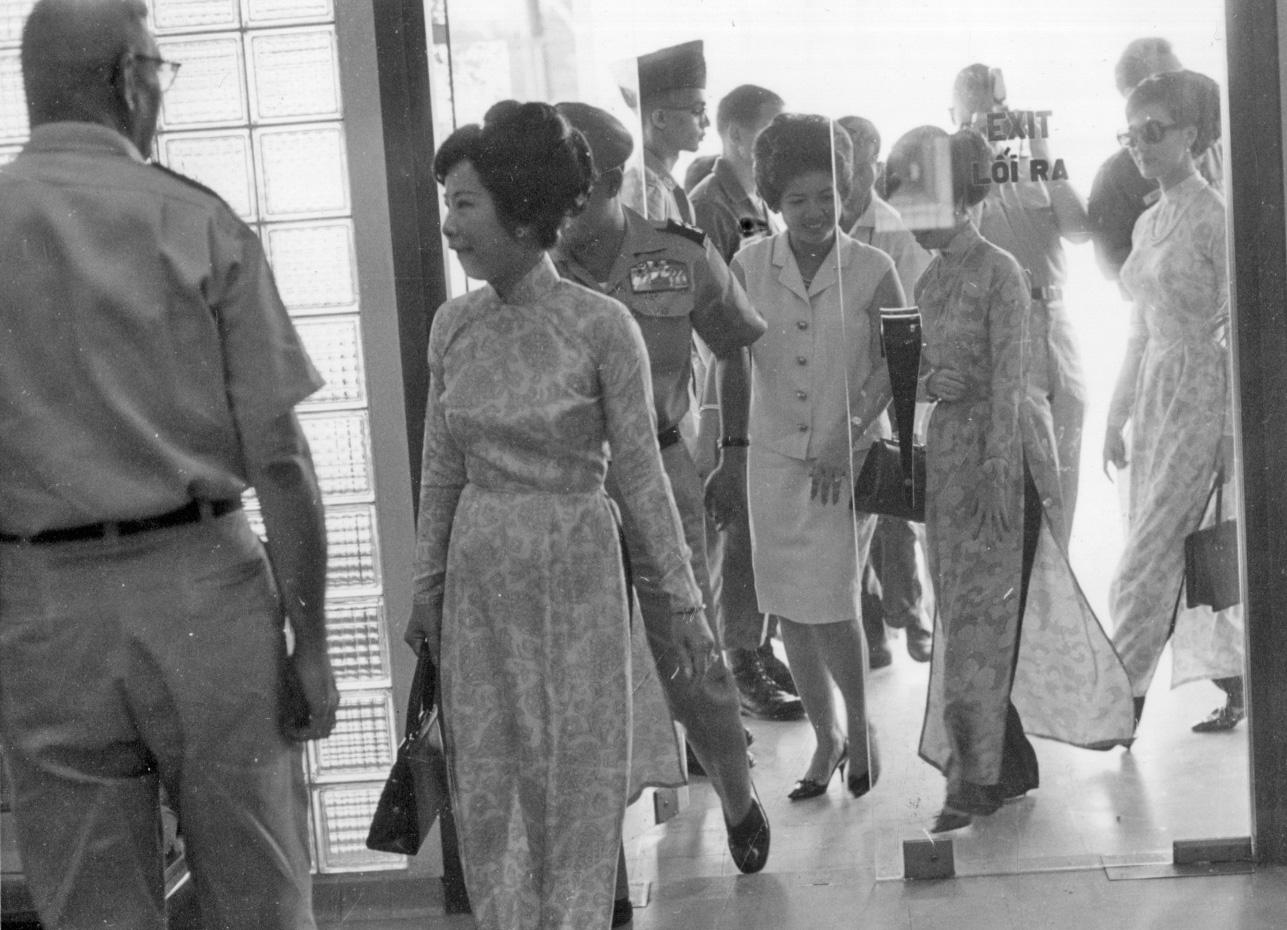
Visit to the 3rd Field Hospital, c. 1966

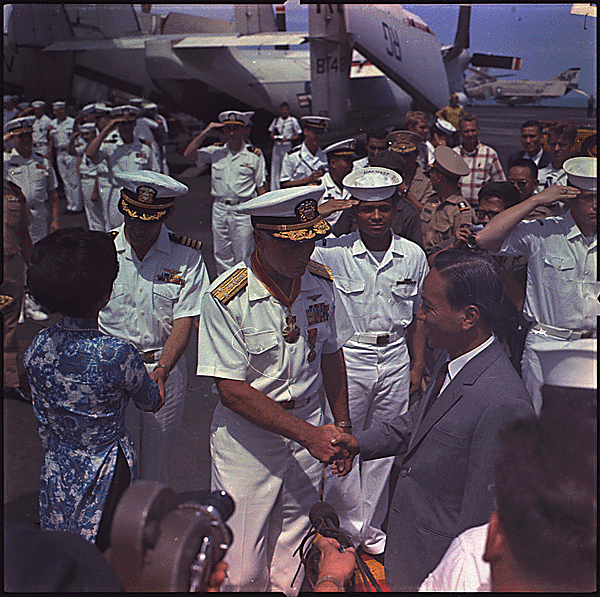
1968 at the Seventh Fleet on the East Sea

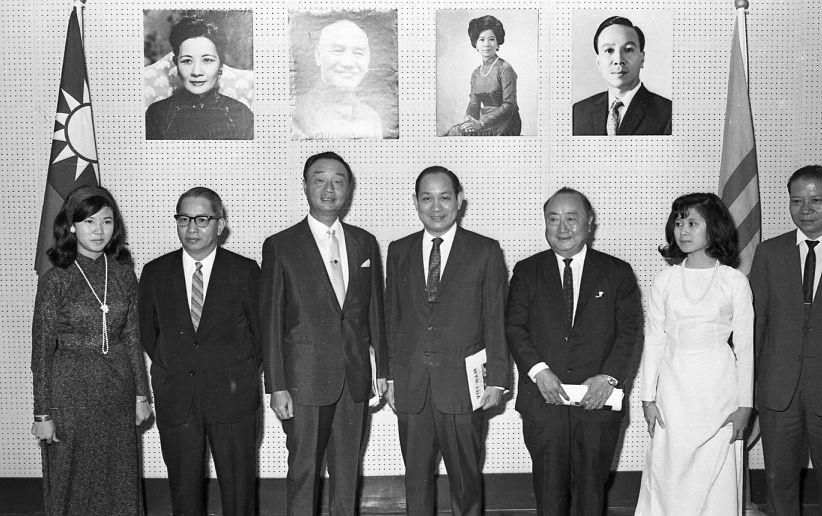
1969 portrait

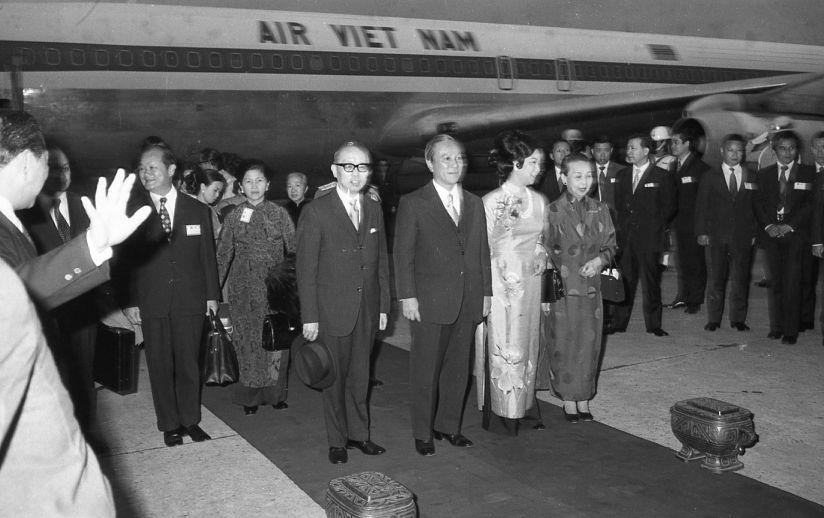
1973 visiting Taiwan

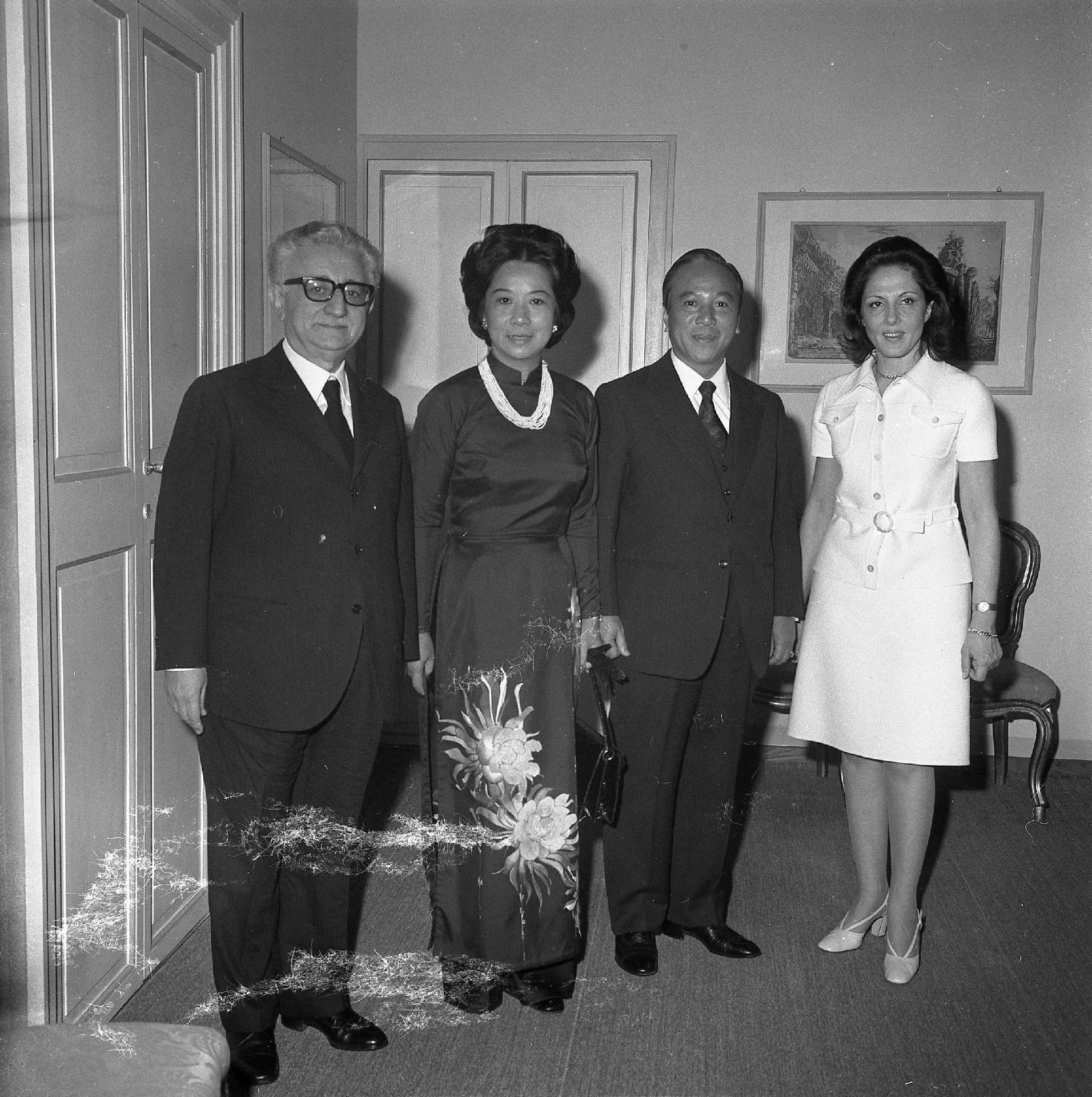
1973 visiting Italy

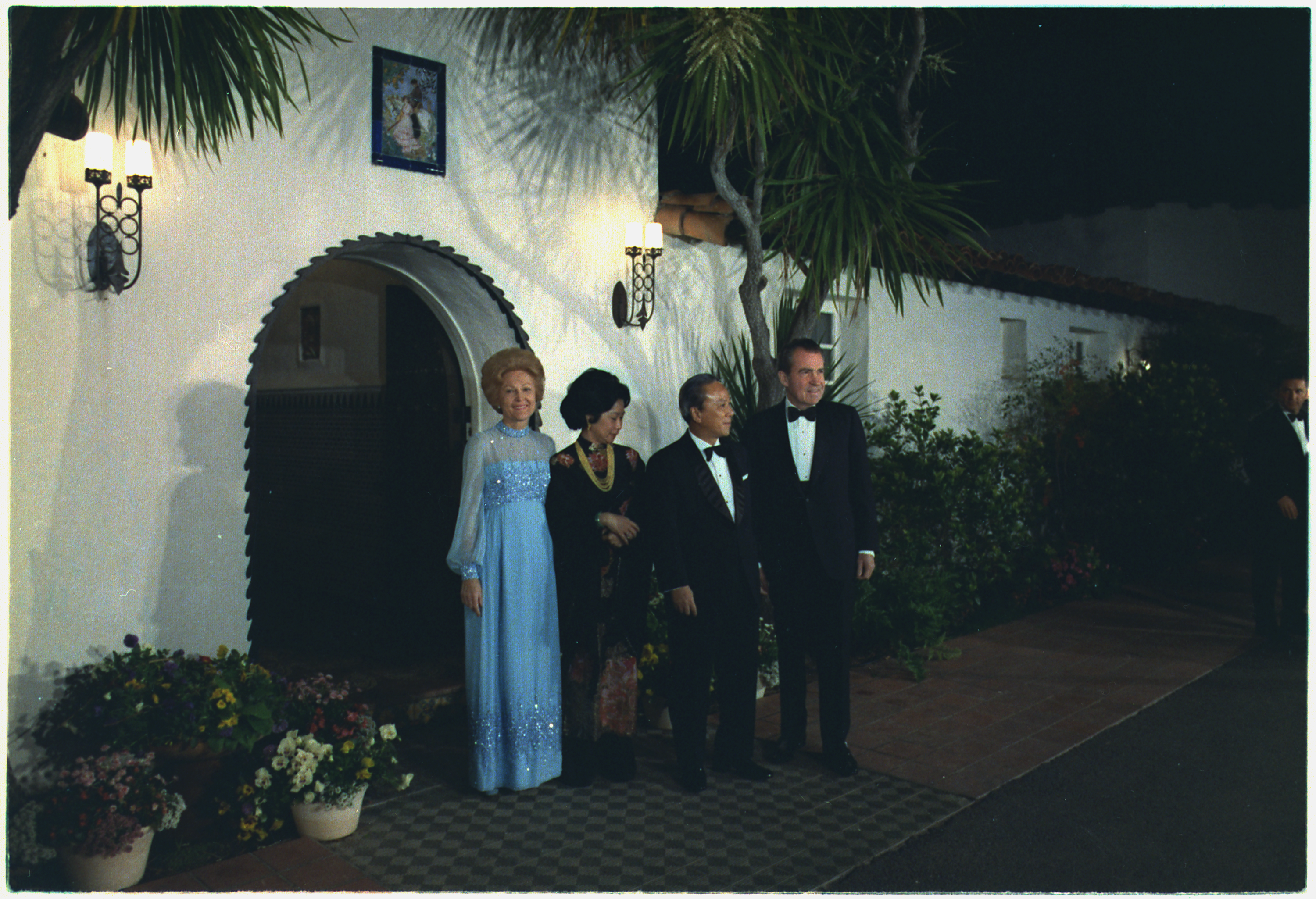
1973 at the dinner of San Clemente residence

1972 Announcement of the Engagement of her daughter Nguyen Thi Tuan Anh

== See also ==
- Trần Lệ Xuân
- Đặng Tuyết Mai
- Đinh Thúy Yến

== Notes and references ==
=== References ===
Preceded by Trần Lệ Xuân	First Lady of South Vietnam; 1967–1975	Succeeded by Position abolished
