= Ngô Đình Lệ Quyên =

Italian lawyer (1959–2012)

- Born: July 26, 1959; South Vietnam
- Died: April 16, 2012 (aged 52); Rome, Italy
- Occupation: Lawyer
- Children: Ngô Đình Sơn
- Parents: Ngô Đình Nhu (father); Madame Nhu (mother)
- Relatives: Ngô Đình Trác (brother); Ngô Đình Quỳnh (brother); Ngô Đình Lệ Thủy (sister)

Ngô Đình Lệ Quyên (26 July 1959 – 16 April 2012), was a South Vietnamese-born Italian lawyer who served as commissioner of immigration for the city of Rome.

== Early life and education ==
At the age of four, on November 2, 1963, after the South Vietnamese coup d'état, in which both her father Ngô Đình Nhu and uncle Ngo Dinh Diem were assassinated, she was forced to leave her country and eventually arrived in Rome, Italy, accompanied by her two brothers. At that time her mother Madame Nhu and sister Ngo Dinh Le Thuy were in the middle of a good-will tour in the United States on behalf of the Vietnamese government.

Once reunited, the family lived in Paris for two years and then in 1965, moved to Rome where she attended elementary through high school in the private Catholic Institution of the Nevers Sisters.

In 1969, she was among the first foreign exiles to receive the status of political refugee in Italy. She was a political refugee for the next 39 years.

In 1978, she obtained a humanities prep high school diploma from Liceo Classico.

She earned a law degree at the Sapienza University of Rome. In her thesis, she delved into The problem of Việt-Nam in the Geneva conference of 1954.

She also attended a two-year course in Marian theology at the Pontifical Theological University Marianum in Rome.

== Career ==
From 1989, guided by the university professor of international law, Maria Rita Saulle, she began doing research work in the field of human rights, asylum and migrations, international and EC law at the Naval University of Naples as well as International Law and Organisation at the University of Rome La Sapienza. She directed several professional training courses and lectured within the master course in "International Protection of Human Rights" of the Faculty of Political Science in Rome (from its establishment in 2001 until 2012).

In 1998, she began her cooperation with the Superior School of Administration of the Interior (SSAI), where she was enlisted in the teachers' register.

In November 1992, she was introduced to don Luigi di Liegro, Director of Caritas Rome, by professor Saulle. She then began her activity in Caritas as Coordinator of the Counselling Centre for Immigrants of the Diocesan Caritas of Rome, the widest and most structured observatory of immigration in the voluntary sector in Italy (more than 185,000 files on foreign nationals registered from 1981 representing 146 countries).

In December 1996, she was promoted as the person in charge of the Immigration Area of the Diocesan Caritas of Rome, coordinating and managing services destined to immigrant citizens (counselling centres, reception centres for men, women, families, nurseries). In this position she interacted constantly with public institutions at the local, national and international levels.

In 2000, she was a member of the Italian Ecclesial Committee for the remission of international debt of poor countries.

As a result of her activity in the field, she was involved by Caritas Italy in the process of establishing a national reception system which resulted in the National Asylum Programme (PNA) (which became in 2002 the national System of Protection of Asylum Seekers and Refugees — SPRAR), in connection with the Ministry of Interior, UNHCR, ANCI (National Association of Italian Municipalities).

== Other activities ==
She was an active in a number of related projects:

- 2000-2007: "Refugee Project", a varied and multifunctional activity consisting in the promotion and coordination of activities related to asylum in 46 Diocesan Caritas working in this sector
- 2002: she coordinated workshops on issues relating to migration and asylum in view of the Urban Social Plan of Rome
- 2003: "Asylum Project", mainly concerned with training in juridical matters within the Diocesan Caritas involved in the National Asylum Programme (PNA)
- 2003: coordinator of the "Immigration, Asylum and Women Trafficking" project, which implied research on comparative law, on the UN convention on the rights of migrant workers and their families, seminars and conferences both in Italian and in Europe, with particular reference to the prevention of women's trafficking in Ukraine (in convention with the Ministry of Interior)
- 2005–2007: "IntegRARsi" and "Meta" projects, within the European programme "Equal", experimenting new ways to ease the job market for refugees
- January 2005 – September 2009: member of the Migration Commission of Caritas Europe, a confederation formed by 48 organisations of 44 countries. Amongst the activities performed:
- Elaboration of a position paper and lectures at European conventions on the subject of Sans Papiers
- Organisation and participation to Migration Commission, Migration Forum, training with UNHCR, Migration Field Studies and “Trojka’’, meetings with the European Union president on duty.
- January 2008-September 2009: the Migration Commission of Caritas Europe elected her as President
- March 2009, Caritas Italy made pressures on Caritas Europe to withdraw the mandate from her. The collaboration with Caritas Italy ended a few months later.
- June 2006 – January 2007: member of the Ministerial Commission on CPT (created by Giuliano Amato, Ministry of Interior, and presided by ambassador Staffan de Mistura) with the following tasks: visit to all Italian Temporary Detention and Assistance Centres, Identification Centres and First Reception Centres in order to analyse the functioning of the structures destined to the temporary detention and assistance of irregular immigrants and hospitality to asylum seekers. The activity of the commission ended with the drawing of guidelines presented to the minister of interior and successively used for the drafting of the new Government bill on immigration.
- On 24 April 2008, Giorgio Napolitano, President of the Italian Republic, bestowed the Italian citizenship on her as she was deemed a person of "highest interest for the State".
- June 2009: President of the Italian section of AWR – Association for the Study of the World Refugee Problem, used as a consulting agency by the UN.
- October 2010: Vice-president of AWR International.
- 2010–2012: she continued with her activity in Caritas Rome, successfully running for FER-funded projects (European Fund for Refugees). Her initiatives regarding both social integration of refugees and research work on asylum were highly praised by the European Commission (EC).

== Award ==
In 2008, the Italian Interior Ministry awarded her Italian citizenship by decree of President of the Republic, for Exceptional interest of the State and outstanding services to Italy.

== Death ==
On April 16, 2012, she was killed in a traffic accident on the way to work in Rome, Italy. Her only sister, Ngô Đình Lệ Thủy was killed in a traffic accident in Longjumeau, France, almost exactly 45 years earlier.

== Publications ==
- Ngo-Dinh, Le Quyen; Ngo-Dinh, Quynh; Willemetz, Jacqueline (13 September 2013). La République du Viêt-Nam et le Ngô-dinh; mémoires posthumes de Madame Ngô-Dinh Nhu (in French). L'Harmattan. ISBN 9782343016146.
- Ngô Đình, Lệ Quyên (16 March 2014). Au bout de la nuit - Perdere tutto senze perdersi (in Italian). Lulu.com. ISBN 978-1291778946.
