= Ngô Đình Lệ Thủy =

Daughter of Ngô Đình Nhu (1945–1967)

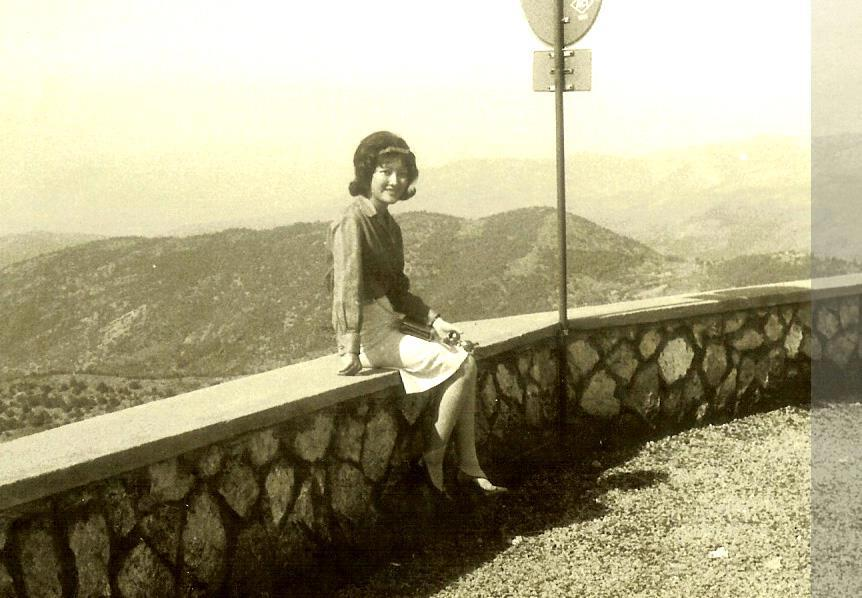
- Lệ Thủy in 1963
- Born: 1945; French Indochina
- Died: April 12, 1967 (aged 21–22); Longjumeau, France
- Relatives: Ngô Đình Nhu (father); Madame Nhu (mother); Ngô Đình Lệ Quyên (sister)

Ngô Đình Lệ Thủy (1945 – April 12, 1967) was the daughter of South Vietnam’s First lady Madame Nhu and Ngô Đình Nhu, the head of the Personalist Labor Revolutionary Party.

== Biography ==
On November 2, 1963, at the time of the assassinations of her father and her uncle Ngo Dinh Diem she had been with her mother in Beverly Hills, California, since October, and preparing for a trip to Italy. The new government of South Vietnam refused to issue her a visa to return and she resettled in Europe with her mother.

Lệ Thủy was attending law school in Paris, when on April 12, 1967, at the age of 22, she was killed in an automobile accident in Longjumeau, France. Just over 45 years later, her younger (and only) sister Ngô Đình Lệ Quyên was killed in an April 16, 2012, automobile accident in Rome, Italy.
