= Oram Group =

American fundraising public relations consulting firm

- Formerly: Harold L. Oram, Inc.
- Type: Private company
- Industry: Public relations
- Founded: 1939; 87 years ago
- Founder: Harold Leon Oram
- Headquarters: New York City, United States
- Area served: United States
- Services: Fund raising campaigns, and advice for non-profit organizations
- Number of employees: 6 (2025)
- Website: www.oramgroup.com

The Oram Group, Inc. (formerly Harold L. Oram, Inc.) is an American fundraising and public relations consulting firm specializing in liberal social causes. The group was founded in 1939 with clients that addressed social and political issues including human and civil rights, the environment, nuclear weapons, and refugee relief.

The Oram Group, Inc. continues to serve nonprofit organizations in the areas of religion, social action, health, civil rights, the environment, and performing arts.

== History ==
The firm's founder, Harold Leon Oram, was born on December 2, 1907, in Butler, Pennsylvania, to Austro-Hungarian immigrants, Samuel and Freda (Ginzler) Oram. After graduation from Butler High School, he spent two years at the University of Miami in Florida majoring in history and economics. In 1934, he earned a law degree from New York Law School, but appears never to have practiced law.

In 1930, Oram began a journalism career in Texas. His first venture, a weekly paper called the Fort Worth Monitor, partnered him with Leopold Mamolen. When the newspaper failed, he left Texas and went to work for newspapers in Hartsdale and Brooklyn, New York, while attending law school. In 1936, Oram began working with the North American Committee to Aid Spanish Democracy, an activist group committed to the Loyalist side in Spain's Civil War. When that organization split, Oram joined the group's liberal faction that included Ralph Bates, Varian Fry, and Roger Baldwin and helped form the Spanish Refugee Relief Campaign. As Director of Publicity and Fund Raising for the organization, Oram was responsible for obtaining funds for relocating Spanish Loyalists who fled Spain following General Francisco Franco's victory.

In September 1939, Oram started a fund raising firm called Consultants in Fund Raising. Shortly afterward, he changed the name to Harold L. Oram, Inc. The firm's early clients were devoted to aiding victims of social injustice. Clients included the Emergency Rescue Committee (predecessor to the International Rescue and Relief Committee), an organization that helped anti-Nazi intellectuals and political leaders escape Europe following the fall of France during World War II. Another client, the National Sharecroppers Fund, sought to improve the conditions for tenant farmers and migrant workers in the United States. A third client from the early 1940s, the NAACP Legal Defense and Education Fund, sponsored the legal assault on segregation.

Oram's first employees were women, Eileen Fry (wife of Varian Fry) and Anna Frank Loeb, who had also met Oram through the Spanish Refugee Relief Campaign. Eve Bates (wife of Ralph Bates), another friend from the days of the Spanish Refugee Campaign, became a part of the firm in 1941. In 1942, Oram left to serve in the army during World War II, leaving them to manage the firm.

When he returned from the army in 1946, Oram's business began to expand. At first, most of the firm's clients were associated with efforts to recover from the effects of World War II and to combat the spread of Communism. They included the American Association for the United Nations, the Citizens Committee for the Marshall Plan, and the Iron Curtain Refugee Campaign. Gradually the list began to include causes concerned with environmental, educational, and health issues.

During the 1950s and early 1960s, he represented a number of anti-Communist Asian causes, including the American Friends of Vietnam, Aid Refugee Chinese Intellectuals, Inc., the Committee of One Million Against the Admission of Red China to the United Nations, and the Dr. Tom Dooley Foundation. Oram also handled public relations in the United States for the Republic of South Vietnam during the late 1950s.

During the 1960s and 1970s, the organization expanded into new fund raising areas including the arts, education, and environmental campaigns. Beginning in the 1960s, Oram began raising money, through capital fund campaigns, for buildings and institutions as well as causes. Two of the earliest capital fund campaigns were designed for the Hampton Institute and Goodwill Industries of Greater New York. As the clientele of the organization made a gradual shift, so did the internal operations. The Oram firm had expanded into several branches and associate offices and found itself in a new era when the company's founder retired.

Oram was among the early American fundraising consultants to make extensive use of direct-mail appeals. His firm assembled donor lists, placed newspaper advertisements that could be reproduced in mailed solicitations, and used telegrams to create urgency around campaigns.

Henry Goldstein, a long-time member of the Oram firm, purchased the company in 1977. Goldstein, a native of New York, entered the fund raising field in the mid-1950s. His first fund raising job was with the United Community Chest of Paterson, New Jersey, and he came to Harold L. Oram, Inc. in 1964. Shortly after Goldstein joined, the organization began to expand. A subsidiary, Oram Associates, was formed to handle capital campaigns, under the guidance of Goldstein and Sidney W. Green. When Green departed, the subsidiary became Oram-Goldstein Associates. Soon, there were other subsidiaries:. Constituency Builders, Inc. (CBI) handled the direct mail campaigns, and Rusk and Oram focused on annual giving. By the time Goldstein purchased the organization in 1977, it consisted of three corporations: the Oram Group, Oram International Corporation, and CBI. Goldstein merged the three into one corporation, Oram Group, Inc.

After Goldstein's purchase of the firm, he continued the traditional fundraising that served as its foundation from the beginning, but began a gradual shift to also provide consultation to the client organizations, with traditional fund raising just one piece of the firm's service to an organization. The Oram Group, Inc. now operates out of two offices in New York and California. Areas of consultation include management counsel for successful interaction within an organization, fund development counsel from planning through implementation of a fundraising campaign, board development, planning studies, organizational assessments, and senior executive search.

== Works or publications ==
- Marybeth Gasman; Noah D. Drezner (2009). A Maverick in the Field: The Oram Group and Fundraising in the Black College Community during the 1970s. History of Education Quarterly. OCLC 465386178.
