= Trần Văn Khiêm =

South Vietnamese politician

Trần Văn Khiêm is the younger brother of Madame Ngô Đình Nhu, the former First Lady of South Vietnam, and a South Vietnamese politician, lawyer and public servant. He was a press officer for South Vietnamese President Ngô Đình Diệm.

== Political career ==
In 1963, during the Buddhist crisis, with relations between the United States and South Vietnam deteriorating, Khiêm drew up a hit list of American officials. In the September 1963 legislative elections, Khiêm stood for the National Assembly for a seat in Vĩnh Long, which he subsequently won. At the same time, he was estranged from his sister and her husband, who suspected him of handing over sensitive information about the government.

== Family ==
He had a child with Mireille Sautereau named Pierre in Paris.

== Criminal charges ==
In 1986, Khiêm was charged with killing his parents, Trần Văn Chuơng and Madame Chuơng, in their Washington, D.C., home. Chuơng had been South Vietnam's ambassador to the United States and observer at the United Nations under the rule of his daughter's brother-in-law, Ngô Đình Diệm. Khiêm was ruled unfit for trial on grounds of mental incompetence.

== Deportation ==
In 1993, then 68, he was released from St. Elizabeths Hospital, when D.C. Superior Court Judge Curtis E. von Kann found that Khiem would never be competent to assist in his own defense. Immigration Judge John Milo Bryant ordered that Khiem be deported, and Immigration and Naturalization Service officials took him to Dulles International Airport, where he boarded a flight to France.
