= Ngô =

Ngô is a Vietnamese surname.

== Notable people with the surname Ngô ==
- Ngô Đình Diệm family
  - Ngô Đình Diệm, South Vietnamese politician and final prime minister of the State of Vietnam
  - Ngô Đình Nhu, brother of Ngô Đình Diệm and archivist and politician
  - Ngô Đình Khả, father of Ngô Đình Diệm and high-ranking Catholic mandarin in the Court of the Emperor Thành Thái of Nguyễn dynasty
  - Ngô Đình Khôi, brother of Ngô Đình Diệm and politician
  - Ngô Đình Cẩn, brother of Ngô Đình Diệm and politician
  - Ngô Đình Luyện, brother of Ngô Đình Diệm and diplomat
  - Pierre Martin Ngô Đình Thục, brother of Ngô Đình Diệm and Roman Catholic Archbishop

== Academia ==
- Ngô Bảo Châu, Vietnamese mathematician; Fields Medal winner (2010)
- Ngô Sĩ Liên, Vietnamese historian and expert on the Lê dynasty
- Ngô Viết Thụ, Vietnamese architect
- Ngô Xuân Diệu, Vietnamese poet

=== Media ===
- Ngô Bá Khá (b. 1993), Internet personality better known by his pseudonym Khá Bảnh
- Ngô Thanh Vân, Vietnamese actress
- Ngô Tự Lập, Vietnamese writer, poet, essayist, translator and songwriter
- Ngô Ngọc Hưng, Vietnamese singer based in South Korea; founder and leader of C.A.C., contestant on the Korean survival program I-Land (11th place)
- Andy Ngo, American conservative activist and journalist

=== Politics and military ===
- Ngô Văn Dụ, Chairman of the Central Commission for Inspection of the Communist Party of Vietnam from 2011 to 2016
- Ngô Xuân Lịch, Vietnam's Minister of National Defence and Chief of the General Department of Politics of Vietnam
- Ngô Thị Thanh Hằng, Vietnamese politician
- Ngô Thị Doãn Thanh, Chairman of the Hanoi People's Council from 2006 to 2015
- Ngô Quang Trưởng, Lieutenant General Army of the Republic of Vietnam (ARVN)
- Ngô Quyền, Emperor of Vietnam in 938, noted for expelling the Chinese
- Ngô Trọng Anh, Vietnamese civil servant
- Ngô Thế Linh, Army Colonel of the Republic of Vietnam
- Ngô Thì Nhậm, Vietnamese scholar and official

=== Religion ===
- Ngô Văn Chiêu (religious name Ngô Minh Chiêu), first disciple of Đức Cao Đài

== See also ==
- Ngô dynasty
- Wu (surname), the Mandarin Chinese transliteration of the surname
