= Ngô Ðình =

Ngô is a Vietnamese family name and Ðình is a Vietnamese middle name. Ngô Ðình is often simplified to Ngo Dinh in English-language text.

== Notable people with Ngô Ðình ==
- Ngô Đình Diệm, first President of South Vietnam (1955–1963); third of six brothers
- Ngô Đình Khả, his father
- Pierre Martin Ngô Đình Thục, second brother, Roman Catholic archbishop of Huế
- Ngô Đình Nhu, fourth brother, adviser
- Ngô Đình Cẩn, fifth brother, unofficial ruler of central Vietnam on Diem's behalf
- Ngô Đình Luyện, sixth brother, ambassador to the United Kingdom
