= Wu (surname) =

Chinese surname

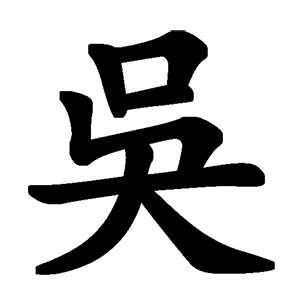
- Wu surname in regular script
- Pronunciation: Wú (Pinyin)
- Language: Chinese, Vietnamese, Korean

Origin
- Language: Old Chinese
- Derivation: State of Wu

Other names
- See also: O Ng; Ngô; Ngov; Vue) (Hmong surname)

Wú is the pinyin transliteration of the Chinese surname 吳 (Simplified Chinese 吴), which is a common surname (family name) in Mainland China. Wú (吳) is the sixth name listed in the Song dynasty classic Hundred Family Surnames. In 2019 Wu was the ninth most common surname in Mainland China. A 2013 study found that it was the eighth most common surname, shared by 26,800,000 people or 2.000% of the population, with the province having the most being Guangdong.

The Cantonese and Hakka transliteration of 吳 is Ng, a syllable made entirely of a nasal consonant while the Min Nan transliteration of 吳 is Ngo, Ngoh, Ngov, Goh, Go, Gouw, depending on the regional variations in Min Nan pronunciation. Shanghainese transliteration of 吳 is Woo.

吳 is also one of the most common surnames in Korea. It is spelled 오 in Hangul and romanized O by the three major romanization systems, but more commonly spelled Oh in South Korea. It is also related far back in Chinese history with the name "Zhou (周)" and "Ji (姬)". The Vietnamese equivalent of the surname is Ngô.

Several other, less common Chinese surnames are also transliterated into English as "Wu", but with different tones:

武 Wǔ, 伍 Wǔ, 仵 Wǔ, 烏 Wū (also Wù), 鄔 Wū and 巫 Wū.

Wu (or Woo or Wou) is also the Cantonese transliteration of the Chinese surname 胡 (Mandarin Hu), used in Hong Kong, Malaysia and by other overseas Chinese of Cantonese-speaking areas of Guangdong, Guangxi, Hong Kong and Macau origin.

== History of the surname Wu (吳) ==
The name originates from the ancient state of Wu in present-day province of Jiangsu.

In the 13th century BC, the state of Zhou (which would later become the Zhou dynasty) was ruled by Tai Wang (King Tai of Zhou). His surname was originally Ji (姬). He had three sons: Taibo, Zhongyong, and Jili. King Tai of Zhou favored the youngest son, Jili to inherit the reins of power, therefore Taibo and his brother Zhongyong voluntarily left Zhou with a group of followers and headed southeast where they established the state of Wu. Taibo and Zhongyong's descendants eventually adopted Wu (吳) as their surname. The state of Wu later became a powerful kingdom of its own with the help of Generals Wu Zixu and Sun Tzu, the latter best known as the author of the military treatise The Art of War, both serving under King Helü of Wu. King Helü is considered to be one of the Five Hegemons of China during the Spring and Autumn period.

Taibo and Zhongyong's youngest brother Jili stayed to rule the Zhou state and was the grandfather of Wu Wang (King Wu of Zhou) who started the Zhou dynasty after successfully overthrowing the Shang dynasty. The descendants of Wu Wang eventually changed their surname from Ji (姬) to Zhou (周) during the Qin dynasty to commemorate the merits and virtues of their ancestors.

Therefore, the surnames Wu (吳), Zhou (周), and Ji (姬) are historically related.

== Notable people ==
(in alphabetical order according to their names as spelled in Pinyin, or if unavailable, in English)

=== Historical figures ===
- 姬 吳泰伯 – Taibo of Wu, eldest son of King Tai of Zhou and the legendary founder of the State of Wu, and the propagator of all people with the surname Wu (吳). Ancestral name is Ji (姬).
- 吳起 (吴起) – Wu Qi, famous Chu general who wrote the Wuzi
- 吳漢 (吴汉) – Wu Han (Han dynasty), military general of Eastern Han
- 吳景 (吴景) – Wu Jing (Han dynasty), military general under Warlord Sun Jian
- 吳瑞 – Wu Rui (eunuch), Chinese eunuch in Lê dynasty Annam (Vietnam)
- 吳承恩 (吴承恩) -Wu Cheng'en, author of Journey To The West
- 吳三桂 (吴三桂) – Wu Sangui (1612–1678), Ming dynasty general
- 吳梅 (吴梅) – Ng Mui (Wu Méi), one of the legendary Five Elders of the Shaolin Temple
- 吳懿 (吴懿) – Wu Yi (Three Kingdoms), general of Shu Han
- 吴藻 – Wu Zao (1799–1862), Chinese poet

=== Modern figures ===
- 吳廷琰- Ngô Đình Diệm (Wú Tíngyǎn), First president of South Vietnam (1955–1963)
- Wu Chen-huan, Political Deputy Minister of Justice of the Republic of China (2012–2015)
- Wu Chien-Shiung, Chinese-American experimental physicist (1912–1997)
- Wu Chih-chung, Deputy Minister of Foreign Affairs of the Republic of China (2016–2018)
- Wu Ching-ji, Deputy Mayor of Taipei (2006–2009)
- Chuan Wu (Chinese: 吳川), Chinese computer scientist
- Wu Den-yih, chairperson of Kuomintang
- Wu Hong-mo, Minister of Transportation and Communications of the Republic of China (2018)
- Wu Hsin-hsing, Minister of Overseas Community Affairs Council of the Republic of China
- Wu Mei-hung, Political Deputy Minister of Mainland Affairs Council of the Republic of China (2013–2015)
- Wu Ming-ji, Deputy Minister of Council for Economic Planning and Development of the Republic of China (2012–2013)
- Wu Rong-i, Vice Premier of the Republic of China (2005–2006)
- Wu Se-hwa, Minister of Education (2014–2016)
- Wu Suxin, actress (fl. 1925–1931)
- Wu Shiow-ming, Chairperson of Fair Trade Commission of the Republic of China (2009–2017)
- Wu Tang-chieh, Political Deputy Minister of Finance of the Republic of China (2013–2016)
- Wu Tiecheng, Vice Premier of the Republic of China (1948–1949)
- Wu Tsung-tsong, Minister of National Science Council of the Republic of China (2006–2008)
- Wu Tze-cheng, Governor of Taiwan Province (2017–2018)
- Wu Tzu-hsin, Administrative Deputy Minister of Finance of the Republic of China
- Wu Ying-yih, Minister of Overseas Community Affairs Council of the Republic of China (2008–2013)
- Wu Yize (born 2003), Chinese snooker player
- Wu Yuhong (born 1966), Chinese badminton player
- 吳恬敏 – Constance Wu, American actress
- Harry Wu (1937–2016), human rights activist
- 吴倩 – Wu Qian (actress), Chinese actress
- Adrienne Wu (born 1990), Canadian fashion designer
- Billy Goh
- 吳辰君 (吴辰君) – Annie Wu (actress), Taiwanese actress
- 吳庚霖 – Wu Geng Lin, birth name of Aaron Yan 炎亞綸, actor and singer in Taiwanese band Fahrenheit
- 吳清源 (吳清源) – Wú Qīngyuán (Go Seigen), Chinese-born Japanese Go player
- Frank Wu, American artist and husband of Brianna Wu
- 伦纳德·吴 – Leonard Wu, American actor
- 吳百福 (吴百福) – Go Pek-Hok (Momofuku Ando) (1910–2007), Taiwanese-born Japanese inventor of instant noodles
- 吳邦國 (吴邦国) – Wu Bangguo (1941–2024), former chairman of the Politburo Standing Committee of the Chinese Communist Party
- 吴官正 – Wu Guanzheng, former member of the Politburo Standing Committee
- 吳尊 – Wu Chun, Brunei-born actor and singer in Taiwanese band Fahrenheit
- 吳健雄 (吴健雄) – Wu Chien-Shiung, Chinese scientist
- 吳彥祖 (吴彦祖) – Wu, Daniel, American actor
- 吳凱文 (吴凯文) – Wu, Kevin, American internet personality
- 吳振偉 (吴振伟) – Wu, David, congressman from the 1st district of Oregon
- 吴虹霓 – Wu, Hongni (born 1994), Chinese mezzo-soprano opera singer
- 吳憲 (吴宪) – Wu, Hsien (1893–1959), an early protein scientist
- 吳季剛 (吴季刚) – Jason Wu, Taiwanese Canadian fashion designer
- 吳迪 -Di Wu (pianist), American-Chinese concert pianist
- 吳鑑泉 (吴鉴泉) – Wu Jianquan (1870–1942), Taijiquan teacher
- 吴立红 – Wu Lihong, environmental activist
- 吴乐宝 – Wu Lebao, Chinese cyber-dissident
- 吳蠻 (吴蛮) – Wu Man, pipa and ruan player
- 吳弭 – Michelle Wu (born 1985), mayor of Boston (2021–)
- 吴旻 – Min Wu (born 1974), Chinese-American electrical engineer
- 吴培铭 – Wu Peiming (Goh Pei Ming, born 1982), Former Singapore Army's Chief of Staff and brigadier general, and Singaporean politician
- 吴函燕 - Wu Hanyan (Goh Hanyan, born 1985), Singaporean civil servant and politician
- 吳慶瑞 (吴庆瑞) – Wu Qingrui (Goh Keng Swee, 1918–2010), former Deputy Prime Minister of Singapore
- 吳蕊思 (吴蕊思) – Wu Ruisi (Goh, Theresa Rui Si), Singaporean Paralympic swimmer
- 吳詩聰 – Shin-Tson Wu (born 1953), American physicist and professor
- Wu Shoei-yun
- 吴水娇 – Wu Shuijiao (born 1992), Chinese track and field hurdler
- 吳天明 (吴天明) – Wu Tianming, Chinese film director
- 吳文俊 – Wu Wenjun (1919–2017), Chinese mathematician
- 吳儀 (吴仪) – Wu Yi (politician), vice-premier of the People's Republic of China
- 呉子良 – Wu Ziliang, the birthname of Emi Suzuki, Japanese model of Chinese descent
- 吳作棟 (吴作栋) – Wu Zuodong (Goh Chok Tong), former prime minister and emeritus senior minister of the Republic of Singapore.
- 吴亦凡 – Kris Wu, ex-member of the Chinese-South Korean boy group EXO, Canadian rapper
- 吴宣仪 – Wu Xuanyi, member of South Korean–Chinese girl group Cosmic Girls, contestant on Produce 101 China, and member of Chinese girl group Rocket Girls 101
- 吳奇隆 – Wu Qilong (Nicky Wu), Chinese actor/singer
- 吴映洁 – Wu Ying Chieh (Gui Gui), Taiwanese mandopop singer and actress
- 吳天恩 – Andrew Gotianun (1927–2016), Chinese Filipino businessman
- 吳奕輝 – John Gokongwei (1926–2019), Chinese Filipino businessman
- 吴非 – Wu Fei, Beijing composer and guzheng performer and improviser
- Wendy Wu, fictional character in Wendy Wu: Homecoming Warrior, 2006 movie
- Wendy Wu, performer with The Photos
- William F. Wu – American science-fiction writer
- 吳漢潤 – Haing S. Ngor, doctor, actor and author
- 吳耀漢 – Richard Woo, Hong Kong actor
- 吳宇森 – John Woo, Hong Kong director
- 呉由姫 – Yuki Kure, manga artist
- 吳光正 Peter Woo Hong Kong business magnate
- 吴军 Wu Jun, Chinese survivor and victim of a robbery-murder case. His friend Cao Ruyin was murdered; their two attackers were separately sentenced to death and to 18.5 years' jail for murder and robbery with hurt respectively.
- 吳漢章 – James Hong, Chinese American actor
- 吳青峰 – Wu Qing-feng (Wu Tsing-Fong), Taiwanese singer and vocalist for Sodagreen band
- 吳宇昂 – Wu Yuang (born 1998), Chinese sprinter
- 吳美樂 -Mary Mei Loc Wu, Chinese classical pianist, also known as Mary Wu

== Other surnames ==
=== Wū (鄔) ===
It is the 78th name on the Hundred Family Surnames poem.

- 邬贺铨 - Wu Hequan, Chinese engineer
- 鄔君梅 (邬君梅) – Wu Junmei (Vivian Wu), Chinese actress
- 邬娜 - Wu Na - Chinese table tennis player
- 邬似珏 - Sijue Wu, Chinese-American mathematician
- 鄔維庸 - Wu Wai-yung Raymond Wu - Hong Kong politician

=== Wū (乌) ===
- 乌国庆 (烏國慶) – Wu Guoqing, police detective and forensic scientist

=== Wū (巫) ===
巫 wū ("shaman") rarely occurs as a surname although it's more commonly associated with Malaysians of Chinese descent, or Chinese people that share connections with Malaysia. In present day, the 239th most common surname in China. It is generally related to the Chinese compound surname Wuma 巫馬 (lit. 'horse shaman equine veterinary'), but can also be regarded as a shortened term for 巫来由/巫來由 (wūláiyóu), a transcription of Malay Melayu.

- Boo Cheng Hau 巫程豪 - Malaysian politician
- Boo Junfeng 巫俊锋 - Singaporean filmmaker
- Boo Tiang Huat 巫镇发 – Singaporean Chinese policeman
- Eric Moo 巫啟賢 – Malaysian Chinese singer
- Moo Yan Yee 巫恩仪 - Malaysian actress
- Emily Wu 巫一毛 - Chinese-American writer
- Wu Chien-ho 巫建和 - Taiwanese actor
- Wu Dan 巫丹 - Chinese volleyball player
- Wu Hung 巫鴻 – Chinese American historian
- Wu Linfeng 巫林峰 - Chinese footballer
- Wu Ningkun 巫宁坤 - Chinese professor
- Wu Yili 巫漪丽 - Chinese-Singaporean classical pianist
