= Kha =

Kha or KHA may refer to:

== Letters ==
- Kha (Bengali), a letter
- Kha (Cyrillic), a letter
- Kha (Indic), a consonant
- Ḫāʾ (sometimes khā), Arabic letter خ

== Other uses ==
- Kha, an ancient Egyptian architect and overseer, buried in TT8
- Kitty Hawk Aircargo, ICAO airline designator

== See also ==
Khá Bảnh (b. 1993), internet personality
