= Feather in the Storm =

Feather in the Storm may refer to:

- Feather in the Storm, a 2006 memoir by Emily Wu
- "Feather in the Storm", an episode in the first season of the television show Strangers with Candy
