= Yan Yunxiang =

Yunxiang Yan
- Occupation: anthropologist
- Known for: Anthropological studies in China

Yan Yunxiang
- Traditional Chinese: 閻雲翔
- Simplified Chinese: 阎云翔
Transcriptions
Standard Mandarin
- Hanyu Pinyin: Yán Yúnxiáng
- Wade–Giles: Yen^{2} Yün^{2}-hsiang^{2}

Yunxiang Yan is a Professor of Social Anthropology and Director of the Center for Chinese Studies at UCLA. He is known for his field work studies in Xiajia Village, Heilongjiang Province, which locates in the northeastern part of China.

== Significant views ==
Yan's 2003 Private Life Under Socialism is an influential anthropology text which addresses the development of the individual as a central social category in rural and community life in China, tying these changes to broader structural forces of individualization during the country's rapid modernization process. Private Life Under Socialism traces China's macro-structural forces of individualization to the May Fourth Movement. The text focuses on changes occurring after the establishment of the People's Republic of China, particularly during the first two decades of reform and opening up. The text addresses decline of family hierarchies and extended family ties, decline in collectivist ideologies, and the development of smaller, child-centered families and new forms of intergenerational solidarity.

Yan noticed fewer violations of China's One-Child policy among rural populations in the 1990s who were historically resistant. He believes this change is because these rural parents, having grown up with birth planning, placed a higher value on material comforts and individual happiness compared to earlier generations.

== In media ==
Yunxiang Yan is also a featured subject, together with Tianjian Shi and Emily Wu, in Chris Billing's 2005 documentary Up to the Mountain, Down to the Village. From 1968 onwards more than 17 million high school students and young adults were sent "up to the mountain, down to the village" (上山下乡 shang shan, xia xiang) to "learn from the peasants." In the documentary three of those youngsters revisit the remote villages to which they were sent thirty years ago.

== Career landmarks ==
=== Publications ===
- The Flow of Gifts. Stanford: University Press, 1996
- Private Life under Socialism. Stanford University Press, 2003
- The Individualization of Chinese Society. Oxford & NY: Berg, 2009

=== Awards ===
- 2010: The Guggenheim Fellowship of the John Simon Guggenheim Memorial Foundation
