= Ngô Đình Nhu =

Vietnamese archivist and politician (1910–1963)

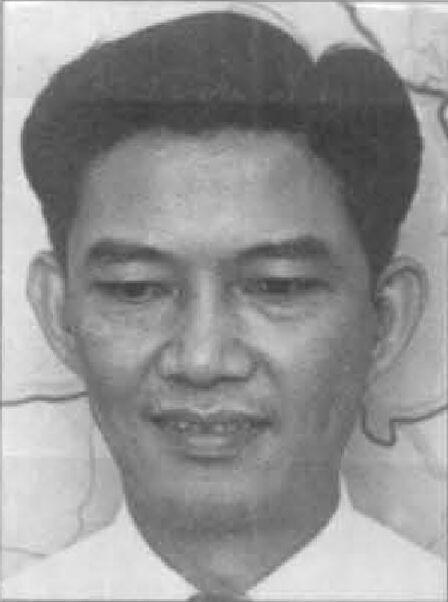
- Nhu in 1963

1st State Counsellor of South Vietnam
- In office 26 October 1955 – 2 November 1963
- President: Ngo Dinh Diem
- Vice President: Nguyễn Ngọc Thơ
- Preceded by: Position established
- Succeeded by: Lê Văn Tỵ

General Secretary of the Personalist Labor Revolutionary Party
- In office 8 August 1954 – 2 November 1963
- Leader: Ngo Dinh Diem
- Succeeded by: Position abolished

Director of National Library of Vietnam
- In office 8 September 1945 – c. 1946

Personal details
- Born: 7 October 1910 Huế, Annam, French Indochina
- Died: 2 November 1963 (aged 53) Saigon, South Vietnam
- Cause of death: Assassination by shooting
- Resting place: Mạc Đĩnh Chi Cemetery (until 1983); Lái Thiêu Cemetery
- Party: Cần Lao
- Other political affiliations: Dai Viet Renaissance Society
- Spouse: Trần Lệ Xuân (Madame Nhu)
- Relations: Ngô Đình Khôi (brother); Ngô Đình Thục (brother); Ngô Đình Diệm (brother); Ngô Đình Cẩn (brother); Ngô Đình Luyện (brother); Trần Văn Chương (father-in-law); Ngô Thế Linh (cousin); Nguyễn Văn Thuận (nephew)
- Children: Ngô Đình Trác; Ngô Đình Quỳnh; Ngô Đình Lệ Thủy (died 1967); Ngô Đình Lệ Quyên (died 2012)
- Parent: Ngô Đình Khả (father)
- Education: École Nationale des Chartes (Palaeographer Archivist)

Ngô Đình Nhu (7 October 1910 – 2 November 1963) was a Vietnamese archivist and politician. He was the younger brother and State Counsellor of South Vietnam's first president, Ngô Đình Diệm. Although he held no formal executive position, he wielded immense unofficial power, exercising personal command of both the ARVN Special Forces (a paramilitary unit which served as the Ngô family's de facto private army) and the Cần Lao political apparatus (also known as the Personalist Labor Party) which served as the regime's de facto secret police.

In his early years, Nhu was quiet and bookish, showing little inclination towards the political path taken by his elder brothers. While training as an archivist in France, Nhu adopted the Roman Catholic ideology of personalism to create the Person Dignity Theory, although critics claimed that he misused that philosophy. Upon returning to Vietnam, he helped his brother in his quest for political power, and Nhu proved an astute and ruthless tactician and strategist, helping Diệm to gain more leverage and outwit rivals. During this time, he formed and handpicked the members of the secret Cần Lao Party, which swore its personal allegiance to the Ngô family, provided their power base and eventually became their secret police force. Nhu remained as its head until his own assassination.

In 1955, Nhu's supporters helped intimidate the public and rig the 1955 State of Vietnam referendum that ensconced his elder brother, Diệm, in power. Nhu used the Cần Lao, which he organised into cells, to infiltrate every part of society to root out opposition to the Ngô family. In 1959, he organized a failed assassination attempt via mail bomb on Prince Sihanouk, the prime minister of neighbouring Cambodia, with whom relations had become strained. Nhu publicly extolled his own intellectual abilities. He was known for making such public statements as promising to demolish the Xá Lợi Pagoda and vowing to kill his estranged father-in-law, Trần Văn Chương, who was the regime's ambassador to the United States, after the elder man condemned the Ngô family's behavior and disowned his daughter, Nhu's wife, Madame Nhu.

In 1963, the Ngô family's grip on power became unstuck during the Buddhist crisis, during which the nation's Buddhist majority rose up against the pro-Catholic regime. Nhu tried to break the Buddhists' opposition by using the Special Forces in raids on prominent Buddhist temples that left hundreds dead, and framing the regular army for it. However, Nhu's plan was uncovered, which intensified plots by military officers, encouraged by the Americans, who turned against the Ngô family after the pagoda attacks. Nhu was aware of the plots, but remained confident he could outmaneuver them, and began to plot a counter-coup, as well as the assassinations of U.S. Ambassador Henry Cabot Lodge Jr. and other American and opposition figures. Nhu was fooled by the loyalist General Tôn Thất Đính, who had turned against the Ngô family. On 1 November 1963, the coup proceeded, and the Ngô brothers (Nhu and Diệm) were detained and assassinated the next day.

== Early years ==
Nhu's family originated from Lệ Thủy district, Quảng Bình in central Vietnam. His family had served as mandarins in the imperial court in Huế. His father, Ngô Đình Khả, was a counselor to Emperor Thành Thái during the French colonisation. After the French deposed the emperor on the pretext of insanity, Khả retired in protest and became a farmer. Nhu was the fourth of six sons, born in 1910.

In his early years, Nhu was aloof from politics and was regarded as a bookish and quiet personality who preferred academic pursuits. By the 1920s, his three elder brothers Ngô Đình Khôi, Ngô Đình Thục and Ngô Đình Diệm were becoming prominent figures in Vietnam. Thục became the Roman Catholic Archbishop of Huế in 1960. In 1932, Diệm became the interior minister but resigned within a few months after realising that he would not be given any real power. Nhu showed little interest in following in their footsteps.

Nhu completed a bachelor's degree in literature in Paris and then studied paleography and librarianship, graduating from the École Nationale des Chartes, the leading archivists' school in Paris. He returned to Vietnam from France at the outbreak of World War II. He was influenced by personalism, a concept he had acquired in the Latin Quarter. It had been conceived in the 1930s by Catholic progressives such as Emmanuel Mounier. Mounier's heirs in Paris, who edited the left-wing Catholic review Esprit denounced Nhu as a fraud. Personalism blamed liberal capitalism for the Great Depression and individualistic greed and exploitation, and disagreed with communism due to its opposition to spirituality.

Nhu worked at Hanoi's National Library and in 1943, he married Trần Lệ Xuân, later known as Madame Nhu. She was a Buddhist but converted to her husband's religion. Nhu worked with scholar Ching Ho A. Chen on Nguyễn dynasty documents. The French dismissed Nhu from his high-ranking post due to Diệm's nationalist activities; he moved to the Central Highlands resort town of Đà Lạt and lived comfortably, editing a newspaper. He raised orchids during his time in Đà Lạt. In 1945, he returned to work as a leading archivist in the Empire of Vietnam, and later in the Democratic Republic of Vietnam.

After the August Revolution of 1945, when Hồ Chí Minh's communist Viet Minh declared independence, various groups as well as the French colonialists jockeyed for political control. Nhu became more politically active, especially in helping his brothers to establish a political base among Vietnamese Catholics. By this time, Khôi had been assassinated by the communists, so Diệm became the leading political figure in the family. Diệm had little success in the late 1940s and went into exile in 1950 to campaign from abroad after the communists sentenced him to death in absentia.

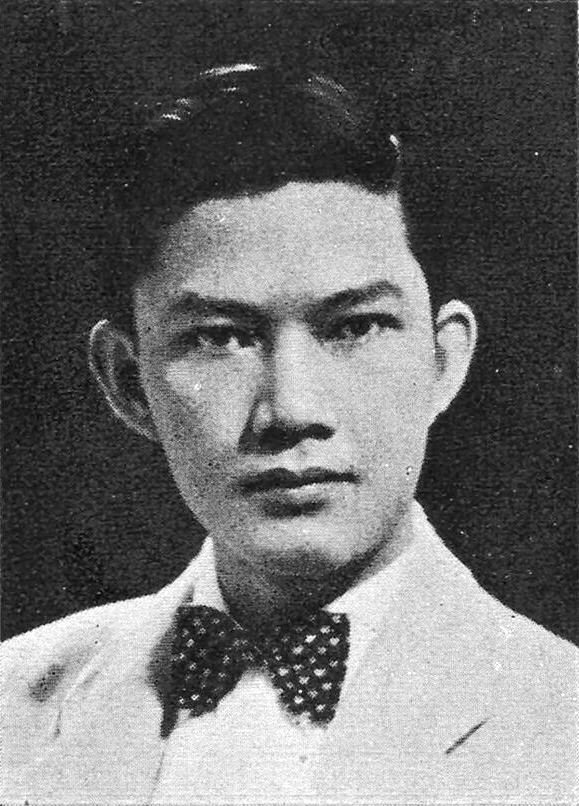
A portrait of Ngô Đình Nhu which appeared in a 1943 who's who book.

Up until this point, Nhu had kept a relatively low-key profile as a political activist. However, he appeared to imbue personalist ideas into his elder brother, who used the philosophy's terminology in his speeches. Diệm and Nhu thought that personalism went well with their "Third Force" anti-communist and anti-colonial ideology.

After 1950, Nhu became a leading figure in the mobilizing of his elder brother's support based among anti-communist Vietnamese. He became assertive in pushing personalism as a guiding ideology for Vietnam's social development. In April 1952, Nhu gave a talk on the topic at the newly opened Vietnamese National Military Academy in Đà Lạt. He said the Catholic concept was applicable to people from all backgrounds, especially in the fight against communist and unadulterated capitalism. He called on all Vietnamese to engage in a personalist-driven social revolution to strengthen the society and country.

Nhu was known for making long, abstract and difficult-to-understand speeches, something which many Vietnamese resented. Although Nhu was known for his pretensions as an intellectual and political philosopher, he was to become quite effective as a political organizer. Around 1950, Nhu started the forerunner of what would become Cần Lao (Personalist Labor Party), forming the power base and control mechanism of the Ngô family. A secret organization, initially, little is known of the Cần Lao's early years. The body consisted of a network of cells, and most members knew the identities of only a few colleagues. After 1954, its existence was declared, but the public knew little of its activities, which were mostly hidden from public view or oversight. In the early 1950s, the Cần Lao was used to mobilize support for Diệm's political campaign. Around 1953, Nhu began an alliance with Trần Quốc Bửu, a trade unionist who headed the Vietnamese Confederation of Christian Workers. Nhu and his supporters began publishing a Saigon journal called Xa Hoi (Society), which endorsed Bửu's movement and trade unionism in general.

At the time, opportunities for opposition politicians began to open up. Bảo Đại, head of state of the State of Vietnam, an associated state of the French Union became increasingly unpopular as the citizens became increasingly impatient with his strategy of allying with the French against the communists in return for gradually increased autonomy and eventual independence. Many felt that the Bảo Đại's policies would never deliver meaningful self-determination.

In late-1953, Nhu began to try to foment and exploit anti-Bảo Đại sentiment. He organised a Unity Congress, a forum of various anti-communist nationalists such as Nguyễn Tôn Hoàn's Nationalist Party of Greater Vietnam, various Catholic groups and activists, as well as the Hòa Hảo and Cao Đài religious sects, and the Bình Xuyên organised crime syndicate. Nhu's real objective was to gain publicity for Diệm, especially while Bảo Đại was overseas and unable to respond effectively. The conference turned into chaos, but Nhu achieved his objective of gaining publicity for his brother; additionally, the other groups had engaged in angry denunciations against Bảo Đại.

The Emperor Bảo Đại announced that a National Congress would be opened in October. The leaders of most of the other parties agreed to participate, but Nhu and his organizations were absent. He was worried that the body might play into Bảo Đại's hands by endorsing him. This appeared to be the way the delegates were heading at first, but a sudden change saw an upsurge of condemnation against Bảo Đại's policies of coexistence with France.

== Rise to power ==
Nhu's brother Diệm had been appointed Prime Minister of the State of Vietnam by Bảo Đại on 16 June 1954 after the French had been defeated at Điện Biên Phủ and 12 days after his Vietnam became a fully sovereign country within the French Union. At the start of 1955, French Indochina was dissolved, leaving Diệm in temporary control of the south. A referendum was scheduled for 23 October 1955 to determine the future direction of the south. It was contested by Bảo Đại, who advocated for the restoration of the monarchy, while Diệm ran on a "republican" platform. The elections were held, with Nhu and the family's Cần Lao political apparatus, which supplied Diệm's electoral base, as well as organising and supervising elections.

Campaigning for Bảo Đại was prohibited, and the result was rigged, with Bảo Đại supporters attacked by Nhu's workers. Diệm recorded 98.2% of the vote, including 605,025 votes in Saigon, where only 450,000 voters were registered. Diệm's tally also exceeded the registration numbers in other districts. Nhu created a web of covert political, security, labor and other organizations, and built a structure of five-man cells to spy on dissidents and promote those loyal to Diệm's regime.

== Power ==
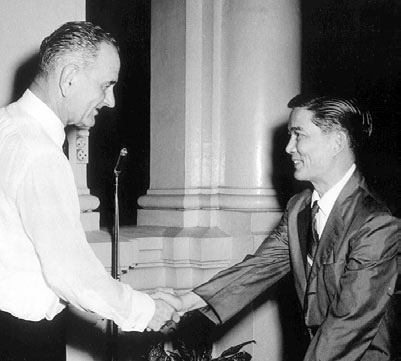
Ngô Đình Nhu meets then US Vice President Lyndon B. Johnson in 1961.

Nhu held no official role in the government, but ruled the southern region of South Vietnam, commanding private armies and secret police. Along with his wife and Archbishop Thục, he lived in the Presidential Palace with Diệm. Pervaded by family corruption, Nhu competed with his brother Ngô Đình Cẩn, who ruled the northern areas, for U.S. contracts and rice trade. He controlled the Army of the Republic of Vietnam Special Forces commanded by Colonel Lê Quang Tung, not for fighting the Viet Cong but in Saigon to maintain the authoritarian rule of his family.

Tortures and killings of so-called "communist suspects" were committed on a daily basis, and extended beyond communists to anti-communist dissidents and anti-corruption whistleblowers. His agents infiltrated labor unions and social organizations, and he expanded the police forces from 20 to 32 officers. They conducted arrests without warrants and selective suppression of criminal activity and graft while turning a blind eye to regime loyalists.

Nhu and his wife amassed a fortune by running numbers and lottery rackets, manipulating currency and extorting money from Saigon businesses. In 1956, Diệm created a rubber stamp unicameral legislature, the National Assembly. Nhu won a seat in the body, ostensibly as an independent, but never bothered to attend a single session of debate or vote, but this made no difference as Diệm's policies were overwhelmingly approved in any formal show of numbers.

In June 1958, the ARVN were involved in border clashes with Cambodia and made gains in the northeastern Cambodian province of Stung Treng. This provoked a war of words between Diệm and Sihanouk. On 31 August 1959, Nhu failed in an attempt to assassinate Sihanouk. He ordered his agents to send parcel bombs to the Cambodian leader. Two suitcases were delivered to the Sihanouks' palace, one addressed to the head of state, and the other to Prince Vakrivan, his head of protocol. The deliveries were labeled as originating from an American engineer who had previously worked in Cambodia and purported to contain gifts from Hong Kong. Sihanouk's package contained a bomb, but the other did not; however, Vakrivan opened both on behalf of the monarch and was killed instantly, as was a servant. The explosion happened adjacent to a room in the palace where Sihanouk's parents were present. At the same time, anti-Sihanouk broadcasts emanated from a secret transmitter located somewhere in South Vietnam, widely attributed to Nhu. Sihanouk quickly blamed the Ngôs and his aides made statements implying the United States might have played a role in the assassination attempt.

The relationship between the two countries became strained thereafter, and Cambodia gave refuge to Vietnamese military personnel involved in attempts to overthrow Diệm. Colonel Nguyễn Chánh Thi and Lieutenant Colonel Vương Văn Đông were given immediate refuge after a failed coup in November 1960, and Republic of Vietnam Air Force pilot Lieutenant Nguyễn Văn Cử was accorded the same treatment after he failed to kill the Ngôs in February 1962.

== Strategic Hamlet Program ==
In 1962, Nhu began work on the ambitious Strategic Hamlet Program, which was informed by his philosophy of Personalism. The program was an attempt to build fortified villages that would provide security for rural Vietnamese. The objective was to lock the Viet Cong out so that they could not operate among the villagers. Colonel Phạm Ngọc Thảo supervised these efforts, and when told that the peasants resented being forcibly removed from their ancestral lands and put into forts they were compelled to build, he advised Nhu it was imperative to build as many hamlets as fast as possible.

The Ngôs were unaware Thảo, ostensibly a Catholic, was in fact a communist double agent acting to turn the rural populace against Saigon. Thảo helped to ruin Nhu's scheme by having strategic hamlets built in communist strongholds. This increased the number of communist sympathisers who were placed inside the hamlets and given identification cards. As a result, the Viet Cong were able to more effectively penetrate the villages to access supplies and personnel.

== Buddhist crisis ==
In May 1963, the Buddhist crisis broke out after nine Buddhist protesters were killed in Huế while protesting a ban on the Buddhist flag on Vesak, the birthday of Gautama Buddha. This prompted the Buddhist majority to stage widespread demonstrations against Diệm, who discriminated in favour of Catholics, for religious equality. The movement threatened the stability of the family's rule. Nhu was known to favor a stronger line against the Buddhists. He had made statements calling for the suppression of the protests through his English-language newspaper, the Times of Vietnam. During this time, his wife Madame Nhu, herself a Catholic convert from Buddhism and the de facto first lady (due to Diệm's bachelor life), inflamed the situation by mockingly applauding the suicides of Thích Quảng Đức and others, referring to them as "barbecues", while Nhu stated "if the Buddhists want to have another barbecue, I will be glad to supply the gasoline".

7 July was the ninth anniversary of Diệm's 1954 ascension to Prime Minister of the State of Vietnam. American pressmen had been alerted to a Buddhist demonstration to coincide with Double Seven Day at the Chanatareansey Pagoda in northern Saigon. When the Buddhists filed out of the pagoda into an adjacent alley, they were blocked by Nhu's secret police. When Peter Arnett and Malcolm Browne began taking photos, the police punched Arnett in the nose, floored him, threw rocks and broke his camera. This incident became known as the Double Seven Day scuffle. Browne took photos of Arnett's bloodied face, and while the police smashed his camera, the film survived. Photos of Arnett's bloodied face were circulated in US newspapers and caused further embarrassment for Diệm and Nhu. The Saigon press corps officially protest Nhu's "open physical intimidation to prevent the covering of news which we feel Americans have a right to know".

There were persistent reports that Nhu was seeking to usurp real power from Diệm and would attack the Buddhists. In a media interview, Nhu said that if the Buddhist crisis was not resolved, he would stage a coup, quickly demolish the Xá Lợi Pagoda, where the Buddhists were massing to coordinate their activities, and head a new anti-Buddhist government. The news was promptly published, although the Americans were not sure if Nhu was serious.

On the evening of 18 August, a group of senior ARVN generals met to discuss the Buddhist crisis and decided that the imposition of martial law was needed to disperse the monks who had gathered in Saigon and other regional cities and return them to their original pagodas in the rural areas. On 20 August they met Nhu for consultations and made their request. Most of the group were already involved in plotting against the Ngô family by this time. The generals played on Nhu's prejudices by saying that the pagodas were infiltrated with communists and that they needed to be dispersed. Hearing this, the brothers agreed to declare martial law effective on the next day, without consulting the cabinet. The real purpose of the generals' request was to maneuver troops in readiness for a coup, and they had no concrete plans to use the regular army to raid the pagodas. However, Nhu took the opportunity to discredit the army by using Tung's Special Forces and the combat police to attack the pagodas.

With the approval of Diệm, Nhu used the declaration of martial law to order armed men into the Buddhist pagodas. Nhu purposely chose a time when the U.S. Embassy was leaderless. Frederick Nolting had returned to the United States and his successor Lodge was yet to arrive. As the high command of the ARVN worked closely with the American advisers, Nhu used the combat police and Tung's Special Forces, who took his orders directly from Nhu. The men were dressed in regular army uniforms, such as paratrooper uniforms, in order to frame the army for the raids. Nhu's motive was to shift the responsibility for a violent operation that would anger the Vietnamese public and the American officials onto the regular army. In doing so, he intended to dent public and American confidence in the senior army officers, who were plotting against him. Nhu hoped the Buddhist majority and the Americans would blame the army for the raids and become less inclined to support a coup by the generals. In the past, Nhu's Machiavellian tactics in playing the generals against one another had kept conspirators off-balance and thwarted coup attempts.

Squads of Special Forces and combat police flattened the gates of the Xá Lợi Pagoda and smashed their way in at around 00:20, 21 August 1963. Nhu's men were armed with pistols, submachine guns, carbines, shotguns, grenades and tear gas. The red bereted Special Forces were joined by truckloads of steel-helmeted combat police in army camouflage uniforms. Two of Nhu's senior aides were seen outside Xá Lợi directing the operation. Monks and nuns were attacked with rifle butts and bayonets, and overpowered by automatic weapons fire, grenades and battering rams. It took around two hours to complete the raids because many of the occupants had barricaded themselves inside the various rooms.

Nhu's men vandalized the main altar and confiscated the intact charred heart of Thích Quảng Đức, the monk who had self-immolated in protest against the policies of the regime. However, some of the Buddhists were able to flee the pagoda with a receptacle with the remainder of his ashes. Two monks jumped the back wall of the pagoda into the grounds of the adjoining United States Agency for International Development (USAID) mission, where they were given asylum. Thich Tinh Khiet, an eighty-year-old Buddhist patriarch, was seized and taken to a military hospital on the outskirts of Saigon. Military control, press censorship, and the airport closures were enacted in Saigon.

The violence was worse in heavily Buddhist Huế. Pro-Buddhist civilians left their homes upon hearing of the raids to defend the city's pagodas. At Từ Đàm Pagoda, which was the temple of Buddhist protest leader Thích Trí Quang, government soldiers, firing M1 rifles, overran the building and demolished a statue of Gautama Buddha and looted and vandalized the building, before leveling much of the pagoda with explosives. Many Buddhists were shot or clubbed to death. The most determined resistance occurred outside the Diệu Đế Pagoda in Huế. As troops attempted to erect a barricade across the bridge leading to the pagoda, the crowd fought back, and the military finally took control after five hours, leaving an estimated 30 dead and 200 wounded.

Some 500 people were arrested in the city, and 17 of the 47 professors at Huế University, who had resigned earlier in the week in protest against the family's policies, were arrested. The raids were repeated in cities and towns across the country. The total number of dead and disappeared was never confirmed, but estimates range up to several hundred. At least 1,400 were arrested. No further mass Buddhist protests occurred during the remainder of Diệm's rule, which would amount to little more than two more months, in any event.

Government sources claimed that at the Xá Lợi, Ấn Quang and other pagodas, soldiers had found machine guns, ammunition, plastic explosives, homemade mines, daggers, and Viet Cong documents; these had been planted by Nhu's men. A few days later, Madame Nhu said that the raids were "the happiest day in my life since we crushed the Bình Xuyên in 1955", and assailed the Buddhists as "communists". Nhu accused the Buddhists of turning their pagodas into headquarters for plotting insurrections. He claimed the Buddhist Intersect Committee operated under the control of "political speculators who exploited religion and terrorism".

Nhu's actions prompted riots from university students, which were met by arrests, imprisonment, and university shutdowns. The high school students followed suit, and followed their university counterparts into jail. Thousands of students from Saigon's leading high school, most of them children of public servants and military officers, were sent to re-education camps. The result was a further drop in morale amongst the putative defenders of the Ngô family. In a media interview, Nhu vowed to kill his father-in-law (for publicly renouncing him), saying: "I will have his head cut off. I will hang him in the center of a square and let him dangle there. My wife will make the knot on the rope because she is proud of being a Vietnamese and she is a good patriot." In the same interview, Nhu claimed to have invented helicopters and pioneered their use in military combat.

On 24 August, the Kennedy administration sent Cable 243 to Lodge in Saigon, marking a change in American policy. The message advised Lodge to seek the removal of the Nhus from power, and to look for alternative leadership options if Diệm refused to remove them. As the probability of Diệm doing so was seen as highly unlikely, the message effectively meant the fomenting of a coup. Lodge replied that there was no hope of Diệm removing Nhu, and began to make contact with possible coup plotters through CIA agents. The Voice of America broadcast a statement blaming Nhu for the pagoda raids and absolving the army of culpability. Lodge believed Nhu's influence had risen to unprecedented levels and that Nhu's divide and conquer tactics had split the military into three power groups.

At the same time as Buddhist crisis was raging, a French diplomatic initiative known to the historians as the "Maneli affair" was taking place. On 25 August 1963, at a diplomatic reception at Gia Long Palace, Roger Lalouette, the French ambassador to South Vietnam and Ramchundur Goburdhun, the Indian Chief Commissioner of the International Control Commission (ICC), introduced Nhu to Mieczysław Maneli, the Polish Commissioner to the ICC. Lalouette had promoting a peace plan calling for a federation of the two Vietnams. During a visit to Hanoi, Maneli had met with Ho Chi Minh and Phạm Văn Đồng and been asked to take a message to Nhu to discuss the peace offer. On 2 September 1963, Maneli followed up his first meeting with Nhu with another at Nhu's office in the Gia Long Palace. Nhu spoke at much length to Maneli about his wish to achieve a synthesis of Catholicism and Marxism as he maintained that his real enemy was not communism, but capitalism.

Shortly afterwards, Nhu met with the American columnist Joseph Alsop who was visiting Saigon, and leaked to him the news that he had met Maneli. On 18 September 1963, Alsop revealed the Nhu-Menali meeting in his "A Matter of Fact" column in the Washington Post. Nhu told Alsop that the offer presented by Maneli was "almost an attractive offer", but he rejected it because "I could not open negotiations behind the backs of the Americans...That was of course out of the question". Through Nhu's intention in leaking the meeting was to blackmail the United States with the obvious message that the Diem regime would reach an understanding with the Communists if Kennedy continued his criticism of the regime, senior members of the Kennedy administration reacted with fury to what Alsop had revealed, and now began to press even more strongly for a coup.

One of the recommendations of the Krulak Mendenhall mission, was to stop American funding for the Motion Picture Center, which produced hagiographic films (propaganda) about the Nhus. and to pursue covert actions aimed at dividing and discrediting Tung and Major General Tôn Thất Đính. Đính was the youngest general in ARVN history, primarily due to his loyalty to the Ngô family. He was given command of the III Corps forces surrounding the capital as he and Tung were the most trusted officers and could be relied upon to defend the family against any coup.

The McNamara Taylor mission resulted in the suspension of funding for Nhu's special forces until they were placed under the command of the army's Joint General Staff (JGS) and sent into battle. The report noted that one of the reasons for sending Tung's men into the field was because they "are a continuing support for Diệm". The Americans were also aware that removing the special forces from Saigon would increase the chances that a coup attempt would succeed, thereby encouraging the army to overthrow the president. Diệm and Nhu were undeterred by suspension of aid, keeping Tung and his men in the capital. Nhu accused the Americans of "destroying the psychology of our country" and called the U.S. ambassador, Henry Cabot Lodge Jr., a "man of no morality".

At Nhu's request, Tung was reported to have been planning an operation under the cover of a government-organised student demonstration outside the U.S. embassy. In this plan, Tung's men would assassinate Lodge and other key officials among the confusion. Another target was the Buddhist leader Thích Trí Quang, who had been given asylum in the embassy after being targeted in the pagoda raids. According to the plan, Tung's men would then burn down the embassy and stage it as a riot provoked by communists and other enemies of the United States.

Another notable instance of religious warfare was perpetrated by Nhu's right-hand man in 1963. A hugely oversized carp was found swimming in a small pond near Đà Nẵng. Local Buddhists began to believe that the fish was a reincarnation of one of Gautama Buddha's disciples. As more people made pilgrimages to the pond, Ngô family officials mined the pond and raked it with machine gun fire, but the fish survived. Nhu's special forces grenaded the pond, finally killing the fish. This backfired, however, because it generated more publicity—newspapers across the world ran stories about the miraculous fish. ARVN helicopters began landing at the site, and paratroopers filled their bottles with water they believed to be magical.

== Coup and death ==
By this time, Diệm and Nhu knew that a group of ARVN generals and colonels were planning a coup, but didn't know Tôn Thất Đính was among them. Nhu ordered Đính and Tung to plan a fake coup against the Ngô family. One of Nhu's objectives was to trick dissidents into joining the false uprising so that they could be identified and eliminated. Another objective of the stunt was to give a false impression of the strength of the regime.

Codenamed Operation Bravo, the first stage of the scheme would involve some of Tung's loyalist soldiers, disguised as insurgents led by apparently renegade junior officers, faking a coup and vandalising the capital. During the orchestrated chaos of the first coup, the disguised loyalists would riot and in the ensuing mayhem, kill the leading coup plotters, such as Generals Dương Văn Minh, Trần Văn Đôn, Lê Văn Kim and junior officers assisting them. The loyalists and some of Nhu's underworld connections were also to kill some figures who were assisting the conspirators, such as the titular but relatively powerless Vice President Nguyễn Ngọc Thơ, CIA officer Lucien Conein, who was on assignment in Vietnam as a military adviser, and Lodge. These would then be blamed on "neutralist and pro-communist elements".

Tung would then announce the formation of a "revolutionary government" consisting of opposition activists who had not consented to being named in the government, while Diệm and Nhu would pretend to be on the run and move to Vũng Tàu. A fake "counter-coup" was to follow, whereupon Tung's men, having left Saigon on the pretext of fighting communists, as well as Đình's forces, would triumphantly re-enter Saigon to reaffirm the Diệm regime. Nhu would then round up opposition figures.

Đình was put in charge of the fake coup and was allowed the additional control of the 7th Division based in Mỹ Tho, south of the capital, which was previously assigned to Diệm loyalist General Huỳnh Văn Cao, who was in charge of the IV Corps in the Mekong Delta. The reassignment of the 7th Division to Đính gave his III Corps complete encirclement of Saigon. The encirclement would prevent Cao from storming the capital to save Diệm as he had done during the 1960 coup attempt.

Nhu and Tung remained unaware of Đình's switch in loyalties. Đình told them fresh troops were needed in the capital, opining that "If we move reserves into the city, the Americans will be angry. They'll complain that we're not fighting the war. So we must camouflage our plan by sending the special forces out to the country. That will deceive them." Nhu had no idea that Đình's real intention was to engulf Saigon with rebel units and lock Tung's loyalists in the countryside where they could not defend the Ngô family. Tung and Nhu agreed to send all four Saigon-based special forces companies out of the capital on 29 October 1963.

On 1 November 1963, the real coup went ahead, with Cao and Tung's troops isolated outside Saigon, unable to rescue Diệm and Nhu from the rebel encirclement. By the time the Ngô brothers realised that coup was not the fake action organised by the loyalists, Tung had been called to the Joint General Staff headquarters at the airbase, under the pretense of a routine meeting, and was seized and executed. Attempts by Diệm and Nhu to make contact with Đình were blocked by other generals, whose staff claimed that Đình was elsewhere, leading Nhu and Diệm to believe he had been captured. Around 20:00, with the Presidential Guard hopelessly outnumbered, Diệm and Nhu hurriedly packed and escaped the palace, with two loyalists: Cao Xuân Vỹ, head of Nhu's Republican Youth, and Air Force Captain Đỗ Thọ, Diệm's aide-de-camp. Thọ's uncle was Colonel Đỗ Mậu, the director of military security and a participant in the coup plot. The brothers were believed to have escaped through a secret tunnel, and emerged in a wooded area in a nearby park, where they were picked up and taken to a supporter's house in the Chinese merchant district of Cholon. Nhu was reported to have suggested to Diệm that the brothers split up, arguing that this would enhance their chances of survival. Nhu proposed that one travel to join Cao's IV Corps, while the other would go to the II Corps of General Nguyễn Khánh in the Central Highlands. Nhu believed the rebel generals would not dare kill one of them while the other was free, in case the surviving brother were to regain power. Diệm turned down this idea because he didn't want to leave Nhu alone.

The brothers sought asylum from the embassy of the Republic of China, but were turned down and stayed in the safehouse as they appealed to ARVN loyalists and attempted to negotiate with the coup leaders. Nhu's agents had fitted the home with a direct phone line to the palace, so the coup generals believed that the brothers were still besieged inside Gia Long. Neither the rebels nor the loyalist Presidential Guard had any idea that at 21:00 they were about to fight for an empty building, leading to futile deaths. Diệm and Nhu refused to surrender, so the 5th Division of Colonel Nguyễn Văn Thiệu besieged the palace and captured it by dawn.

In the early morning of 2 November, Diệm and Nhu agreed to surrender. The ARVN officers had promised the Ngô brothers safe exile and an "honorable retirement". The U.S. did not want Diệm or Nhu near Vietnam "because of the plots they will mount to try to regain power". When Dương Văn Minh found the palace empty, he was angered, but was soon informed of the Ngô brothers' location. Nhu and Diệm fled to the nearby Catholic Church of St. Francis Xavier, where they were taken into custody and put into an armoured personnel carrier, to be taken back to military headquarters. The convoy was led by General Mai Hữu Xuân and the brothers were guarded inside the APC by Major Dương Hiếu Nghĩa and Captain Nguyễn Văn Nhung, Minh's bodyguard. Before the convoy had departed for the church, Minh was reported to have gestured to Nhung with two fingers. This was taken to be an order to kill both brothers. An investigation by General Trần Văn Đôn later determined that Duong Hieu Nghia shot the brothers at point-blank range with a semi-automatic firearm and that Nhung sprayed them with bullets before repeatedly stabbing the bodies with a knife.

Nghia gave his account of what occurred during the journey back to the military headquarters: "As we rode back to the Joint General Staff headquarters, Diệm sat silently, but Nhu and the captain [Nhung] began to insult each other. I don't know who started it. The name-calling grew passionate. The captain had hated Nhu before. Now he was charged with emotion." Nghia said that "[Nhung] lunged at Nhu with a bayonet and stabbed him again and again, maybe fifteen or twenty times. Still in a rage, he turned to Diệm, took out his revolver and shot him in the head. Then he looked back at Nhu, who was lying on the floor, twitching. He put a bullet into his head too. Neither Diệm nor Nhu ever defended themselves. Their hands were tied." According to historian Howard Jones, the fact "that the killings failed to make the brothers into martyrs constituted a vivid testimonial to the depth of popular hatred they had aroused." Some months later, Minh reportedly confided to an American source that "We had no alternative. They had to be killed. Diệm could not be allowed to live because he was too much respected among simple, gullible people in the countryside, especially the Catholics and the refugees. We had to kill Nhu because he was so widely feared—and he had created organizations that were the arms of his personal power."

The two brothers (Nhu and Diệm) were buried by the junta in a location that remains unknown. The speculated burial places include a military prison, a local cemetery, and the grounds of the JGS headquarters at Tan Son Nhut; there are also reports of cremation.

== Children ==
- Ngô Đình Lệ Thủy (1945) was killed in April 1967, in an automobile accident in Longjumeau, France.
- Ngô Đình Trác (1949) became an agricultural engineering graduate, and he is married to an Italian woman. They have four children (three sons, one daughter). He died of a stroke in 2022.
- Ngô Đình Quỳnh (1952) graduated from ESSEC (École supérieure des sciences économiques et commerciales), a private school training professionals in the economy; he works as a trade representative for a U.S. company in Brussels, Belgium.
- Ngô Đình Lệ Quyên (1959) earned a PhD from the University of Rome. She was a lawyer in the legal IT sector and lectured at presentations by the Law Faculty of the University of Rome. She also served as commissioner of immigration for Caritas Europe. On 16 April 2012, she was killed in an automobile accident on the way to work in Rome.

== Sources ==
- Buttinger, Joseph (1967). Vietnam: A Dragon Embattled. New York City: Praeger.
- Clymer, Kenton J. (2004). The United States and Cambodia, 1870–1969: From Curiosity to Confrontation. Routledge. ISBN 978-0-415-32332-1.
- Currey, Cecil B. (1999). Victory at Any Cost: the genius of Viet Nam's Gen. Vo Nguyen Giap. Washington, D.C.: Brassey. ISBN 1-57488-194-9.
- Dommen, Arthur J. (2001). The Indochinese Experience of the French and the Americans: Nationalism and Communism in Cambodia, Laos, and Vietnam. Bloomington, Indiana: Indiana University Press. ISBN 0-253-33854-9.
- Gettleman, Marvin E. (1966). Vietnam: History, documents and opinions on a major world crisis. Harmondsworth, Middlesex: Penguin Books.
- Halberstam, David; Singal, Daniel J. (2008). The Making of a Quagmire: America and Vietnam during the Kennedy Era. Lanham, Maryland: Rowman & Littlefield. ISBN 978-0-7425-6007-9.
- Hammer, Ellen J. (1987). A Death in November: America in Vietnam, 1963. New York City: E. P. Dutton. ISBN 0-525-24210-4.
- Hatcher, Patrick Lloyd (1990). The suicide of an elite: American internationalists and Vietnam. Stanford, California: Stanford University Press. ISBN 0-8047-1736-2.
- Hickey, Gerald Cannon (2002). Window on a War: An Anthropologist in the Vietnam Conflict. Lubbock, Texas: Texas Tech University Press. ISBN 0-89672-490-5.
- Isaacs, Arnold R. (1983). Without Honor: Defeat in Vietnam and Cambodia. Baltimore, Maryland: Johns Hopkins University Press. ISBN 0-8018-3060-5.
- Jacobs, Seth (2006). Cold War Mandarin: Ngo Dinh Diem and the Origins of America's War in Vietnam, 1950–1963. Lanham, Maryland: Rowman & Littlefield. ISBN 0-7425-4447-8.
- Jones, Howard (2003). Death of a Generation: how the assassinations of Diem and JFK prolonged the Vietnam War. New York City: Oxford University Press. ISBN 0-19-505286-2.
- Karnow, Stanley (1997). Vietnam: A history. New York City: Penguin Books. ISBN 0-670-84218-4.
- Langguth, A. J. (2000). Our Vietnam: the war, 1954–1975. New York City: Simon & Schuster. ISBN 0-684-81202-9.
- Maclear, Michael (1981). Vietnam:The ten thousand day war. New York City: Methuen. ISBN 0-423-00580-4.
- Miller, Edward (October 2004). "Vision, Power and Agency:The Ascent of Ngo Dinh Diem". Journal of Southeast Asian Studies. 35 (3). Singapore: Cambridge University Press: 433–458. doi:10.1017/S0022463404000220. S2CID 145272335.
- Moyar, Mark (2006). Triumph Forsaken: The Vietnam War, 1954–1965. New York: Cambridge University Press. ISBN 0-521-86911-0.
- Olson, James S. (1996). Where the Domino Fell. St. Martin's Press. ISBN 0-312-08431-5.
- Osborne, Milton (1994). Sihanouk: Prince of Light, Prince of Darkness. Crows Nest, New South Wales: Allen & Unwin. ISBN 1-86373-642-5.
- Porter, Gareth (2005). Perils of Dominance: Imbalance of Power and the Road to War in Vietnam. Los Angeles: University of California Press. ISBN 0520940407.
- Prochnau, William (1995). Once upon a Distant War. New York City: Vintage. ISBN 0-8129-2633-1.
- Scigliano, Robert (1964). South Vietnam: Nation Under Stress. Boston, Massachusetts: Houghton Mifflin.
- Shaplen, Robert (1966). The Lost Revolution: Vietnam 1945–1965. London: André Deutsch.
- Sheehan, Neil (1988). A Bright Shining Lie: John Paul Vann and America in Vietnam. New York City: Random House. ISBN 0-679-72414-1.
- Truong Nhu Tang (1986). Journal of a Vietcong. London: Cape. ISBN 0-224-02819-7.
- Tucker, Spencer C. (2000). Encyclopedia of the Vietnam War: A Political, Social and Military History. Santa Barbara, California: ABC-CLIO. ISBN 1-57607-040-9.
