= Wu Hequan =

Chinese engineer and politician

- 邬贺铨
- Born: 16 January 1943 (age 83); Guangzhou, Guangdong, China
- Education: Wuhan University of Posts and Telecommunications
- Scientific career
- Fields: Optical fiber transmission network Broadband information network
- Workplaces: Chinese Academy of Engineering

Chinese name
- Simplified Chinese: 邬贺铨
- Traditional Chinese: 鄔賀銓
Transcriptions
Standard Mandarin
- Hanyu Pinyin: Wū Hèquán

Wu Hequan (born 16 January 1943) is a Chinese engineer who was vice president of the Chinese Academy of Engineering from 2002 to 2010. He is a member of the Chinese Communist Party. He was also a delegate to the 8th National People's Congress and a member of the 10th and 11th National Committee of the Chinese People's Political Consultative Conference.

== Biography ==
Wu was born in Guangzhou, Guangdong, on 16 January 1943, while his ancestral home in Panyu County (now Panyu District). In 1960, he was accepted to Wuhan University of Posts and Telecommunications. After university in 1964, he was despatched to the Research Institute of Posts and Telecommunications, Ministry of Posts and Telecommunications. He worked at the 505 Factory of Sichuan Meishan Telecom Administration from 1969 to 1975 and the Chongqing Department of Posts and Telecommunications from 1975 to 1993. In June 1993, he was appointed vice president and chief engineer of Telecommunications Science and Technology Research Institute and vice president of Datang Telecom Group. After this office was terminated in January 2002, he became vice president of the Chinese Academy of Engineering, serving until January 2010. On 5 July 2013, he was proposed as chairman of the Internet Society of China.

== Honours and awards ==
- 1988 State Science and Technology Progress Award (Second Class) for 155m / 622m SDH (synchronous digital series) optical transmission system
- 1999 Member of the Chinese Academy of Engineering (CAE)
- 2002 Science and Technology Progress Award of the Ho Leung Ho Lee Foundation
