= Wu Ningkun =

Chinese academic (1920–2019)

- Born: September 1920; Yangzhou, Jiangsu, China
- Died: August 10, 2019 (aged 98); Virginia, United States
- Education: National Southwestern Associated University; Manchester University (Indiana); University of Chicago
- Occupation: Translator
- Children: Wu Yiding (son); Emily Wu (daughter); Wu Yicun (son)
- Writing career
- Language: Chinese, English

Chinese name
- Traditional Chinese: 巫寧坤
- Simplified Chinese: 巫宁坤
Transcriptions
Standard Mandarin
- Hanyu Pinyin: Wū Nìngkūn

Wu Ningkun (Chinese: 巫宁坤; September 1920 – August 10, 2019) was Professor Emeritus of English at the University of International Relations in Beijing, where he had taught since 1956. During the 1980s, he held Visiting Fellowships at Cambridge University, Northwestern University and the University of California. In 1990, he was awarded a Doctor of Humane Letters from Manchester University, Indiana. In 1992, he was Mansfield Visiting professor of Chinese Studies at the University of Montana. He has frequently lectured at Cambridge, Columbia, Stanford, Harvard and other universities. His publications include the memoir, A Single Tear - A Family's Persecution, Love, and Endurance in Communist China, written in collaboration with his wife, Li Yikai (李怡楷); scholarly essays in English and Chinese; and translations from English into Chinese and vice versa, among them a translation of The Great Gatsby by F. Scott Fitzgerald. He was a member of the Independent Chinese PEN Center, but resigned in 2006.

== Biography ==
Wu Ningkun was born on August 14, 1920 (lunar calendar), Yangzhou, Jiangsu, China. In 1939, at the end of his sophomore year at the National Southwestern Associated University in Kunming, he volunteered for the Chinese National Revolutionary Army as interpreter for the American Flying Tigers. After the Second World War, in 1946, he took up his study of English literature again at Manchester University (Indiana) and the University of Chicago. In 1951, while working on a dissertation about T. S. Eliot, he was invited to return to China and accept an academic position at Yenching University, Beijing, replacing an American professor who was forced to depart due to the Korean War. He decided to interrupt his doctoral studies and accept the invitation: "The lure of a meaningful life in a brave new world outweighed the attraction of a doctorate and an academic future in an alien land." In his memoir he recounts an anecdote about T. D. Lee, one of the fellow graduate students who had come to see him off for his journey:

"Why aren't you coming home to serve the new China, T. D.?" He answered with a knowing smile, "I don't want to have my brains washed by others." As I didn't know how brains could be washed, I did not at the time find the idea very daunting.

Not long after his return, however, Wu got his first taste of what "brain washing" could mean, in the form of enforced "thought reform" sessions.

In 1952, after one year at Yenching University, Wu was transferred to Nankai University, Tianjin, where he met his wife, Li Yikai. The couple married in 1954. During the 1955 Campaign to Uproot Hidden Counterrevolutionaries Wu was suspected of having been a Nationalist spy, or of still being an American spy, and he was denounced as the number-one "hidden counterrevolutionary" at Nankai University. In 1957, during the Hundred Flowers Campaign, he was one of the intellectuals who - despite initial misgivings - spoke up for freedom of speech. This led to his formal denouncement as an "ultra-rightist" during the Anti-Rightist campaign of September 1957, and in the spring of 1958 he was sent to a state prison farm in Heilongjiang for "corrective education through hard labor". In 1961, during the famine caused by the Great Leap Forward, he was released from prison.

During the Cultural Revolution (1966–1976) Wu and his family were again persecuted, as were so many other intellectuals and their families.

In 1980 he was rehabilitated, and he resumed his former teaching post at the Institute of International Relations.
