= Ngô Đình Khôi =

Vietnamese politician (1885–1945)

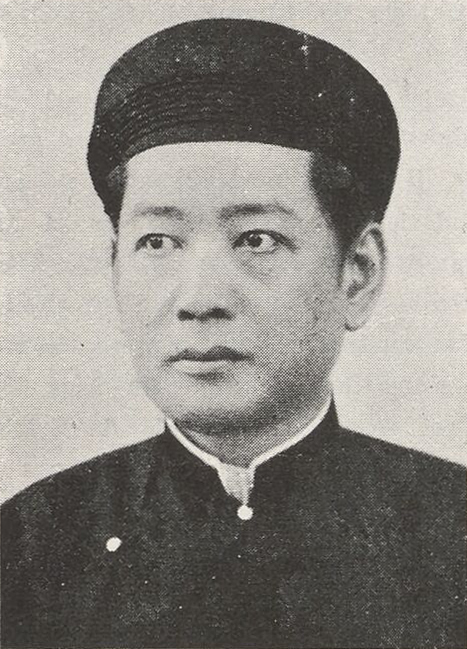
Ngô Đình Khôi

Ngô Đình Khôi ( chữ Hán: 吳廷魁, 1885–1945) was the eldest son of Ngô Đình Khả. He had eight younger siblings: five brothers, Ngô Đình Thục, Ngô Đình Diệm, Ngô Đình Nhu, Ngô Đình Cẩn, Ngô Đình Luyện; and three sisters, Giao, Hiệp, and Hoàng.

In 1930, he was promoted governor of Quảng Nam Province. His son Ngô Đình Huân served as secretary and interpreter for Yokoyama Masayuki, the director of the Japan Institute of Culture in Saigon, and later as Labor Inspector.

When Japanese forces overtook French Indochina in March 1941, Ngô Đình Khôi advised Emperor Bảo Đại not to abdicate as he possessed a number of weapons. His son Ngô Đình Huân also served as a liaison between the Huế court and the imperial court. The Viet Minh accused them of supporting Japan.

During the August Revolution in the autumn of 1945, Khôi and Huân were arrested by the Viet Minh along with the renowned scholar Phạm Quỳnh. The Viet Minh cadres scolded and beat Huân and said that he would die with his father. Both father and son were later buried alive.
