= Ngô Đình Khả =

Vietnamese politician

- 吳廷可
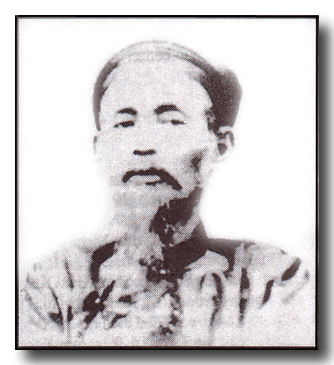
- Khả in traditional Mandarin robes.
- Born: 1856; Le Thuy, Quảng Bình, Đại Nam
- Died: 27 January 1925 (aged 68–69); French Indochina
- Resting place: Phu Cam Cemetery
- Education: Paris Foreign Missions Society
- Occupation: Mandarin
- Spouse: Anna Nguyen Thi Than
- Children: Ngô Đình Khôi; Ngô Đình Thục; Ngô Đình Diệm; Ngô Đình Nhu; Ngô Đình Cẩn; Ngô Đình Luyện
- Parent(s): James Ngô Đình Niem; Ursula Khoa
- Relatives: Nguyễn Văn Thuận (grandson)

Ngô Đình Khả (吳廷可, 1856–1923; some sources state 1850–1925) was a high-ranking Catholic mandarin in the Court of the Emperor Thành Thái of the Nguyễn dynasty in Huế, Vietnam. He helped establishing the Quốc Học (a High School for the Gifted) in Huế and was a confidant to the emperor. He strongly opposed the French dominance of the Huế Court and when the French grew tired of Emperor Thành Thái's attempts to rein in their growing influence, Khả was the only member of the Council of Ministers to refuse to sign a petition requesting the emperor's abdication. This led to him gaining widespread renown for his loyalty. However, it also led to his removal from the court and his subsequent banishment to his home village.

Khả is best-known for being the patriarch of the Ngô Đình family, the most prominent Vietnamese Catholic family. His son, Ngô Đình Diệm, was the first president of South Vietnam while another son, Ngô Đình Thục, was the third Vietnamese Catholic Bishop. Khả has sometimes been seen as a collaborator with the French. However, more recent scholarship has shown that he may be a forgotten nationalist.

== Background ==
=== Early life ===
Michael Ngô Dinh Khả was born in 1856 in Le Thuy in Quảng Bình Province.

=== Education ===
In Penang, in present day Malaysia, he became well-versed in Latin and French and in Western Philosophy. However, Penang was a crucible of cultures from Vietnam to Southern China, Siam, Korea, and British India. Students from these different areas lived and studied together and this led to them being more globally-minded. Many of those who went to the seminary did not end up becoming priests but served in administration.

=== Tragedy ===
Tragedy struck the Ngô family while Khả was still studying in the MEP Seminary in Penang. Most of his family members, except his mother who managed to escape, were murdered in a riot which erupted in conflagration. Some sources claimed the deadly riot was led by Buddhist monks and that more than a hundred members of the Ngô family had perished in the fire. Both these timelines are odd because sources claim that he had returned in the 1870s.

=== Return to Vietnam ===
When Khả returned to Vietnam in the late 1870s, he had originally planned to become a Catholic priest. However, the newly established French colonial state needed someone to help them with interpreting. Thus, together with Nguyễn Hữu Bài, Khả became an interpreter. Later, he joined the Nguyễn civil service. He managed to pass all the sessions of the Imperial Examinations owing to his firm grasp of the Chinese Classics. Following that, he left the service to take care of his mother.

=== Quốc Học ===
Due to his capacity in both the Chinese Confucian Classics and in the European languages and philosophy, Emperor Thành Thái requested that Khả build and head a National Institute (Quốc Học) that would combine Eastern and Western studies. This suited Khả, then a strong proponent of the Franco-Annamite curriculum. The Franco-Annamite schools were not meant as a form of assimilation but rather "an improvement of indigenous skills through relevant education". The Quốc Học was established on 17 September 1896 in the eighth year to Thành Thái's reign. Ngô Đình Khả was the Principal of the school. A Saigon newspaper article published when Khả's son Thuc was getting ordained a bishop praise Khả for, "In an era when the Annamite elite, represented by Mandarins, was hostile to modern progress, Khả had the courage to take on the difficult task of mediating between the prejudices of the mandarins and the need for modern progress. Notable graduates of the Quốc Học included Võ Nguyên Giáp and Phạm Văn Đồng. Ho Chi Minh also attended the school but dropped out in 1909 when his father lost his post as a district chief.

=== Other positions ===
Following his service to the Quốc Học, Khả joined the palace, first as Commander or the Palace Guards and later as Minister of Rites. He was also an imperial tutor of French to the Emperor and his brothers. In 1902, the Emperor granted Khả the title of Great Scholar Assistant to the Throne.

== Activism against French ==
=== French policy towards Emperor Thành Thái ===
In 1897, when Emperor Thành Thái had come of age, the French established a Council of Ministers which consisted of Vietnamese Ministers as well as French officials. This body was under the presidency of the Resident Superior in Hue. In 1898, the French administration in Annam took over the collection of taxes from the Hue Court. The Resident Superior would then transfer a sum of money annually to the imperial treasury to support the maintenance of the imperial family, the imperial services and the civil service. The French government had effectively, "put the imperial government on an allowance."

Emperor Thành Thái could not stand his powerlessness and tried to assert himself more. However, the French were not interested in granting the Vietnamese any power and thus looked for a way to get rid of him. Thành Thái, suspecting the French wanted to depose him, tried to portray himself as a selfish playboy that would do no harm to French colonial ambitions. However, the French saw through his charade and decided to use it against him by spreading false rumours about his behavior with women. Thành Thái then tried to get the French to think he was crazy and thus, again, not a threat to their ambitions.

The French chargé d'affaires, Silvain Levecque, wanted to bring down Emperor Thành Thái and replace him with someone more pliant. He was not the Resident Superior but he was rather in charge of current affairs while the French appointed a Resident Superior. Levecque had prepared a list of mandarins for promotion to the different ministries. However, he did not consult with the emperor and instead merely presented Emperor Thành Thái with the memorandum for promotion. This enraged the emperor and made him feel even more like a puppet.

=== Khả's stance ===
Levecque then forced the Council of Ministers to sign a petition requesting Thành Thái abdicate. He warned them that not signing the request would be tantamount to a rebellion against France. However, Khả refused to sign the request and resigned instead. Without his signature Levecque would be unable to claim that he had agreed to the removal of Thành Thái and this allowed Khả to write to newspapers both in Vietnam and France about what was happening with regards to the emperor. Levecque forced Nguyễn Hữu Bài to get Khả's signature, Bài refused and offered his resignation as well. Eventually, Levecque presented the petition requesting the emperor's abdication to Thành Thái without Ngô Dinh Khả's signature. At this point, Khả sent the articles to both the French and Vietnamese press denouncing Levecque's actions. Khả's stance against the French became known throughout Vietnam. Some scholars have noted there were folk songs and poems written about his bravery. Edward Miller writes that Ho Chi Minh himself recalled one of the proverbs, "To deport the King, you must first get rid of Kha."

=== Repercussions ===
The Council of Regents, presided over by Levecque sentenced Khả to be stripped of all his ranks, functions, and honours. He was to be sent back to his native village in Le Thuy, in the province of Quảng Bình. He would also not receive his pension which was entitled to him. However, some historians have challenged this notion of why Khả had resigned and claimed that he resigned as Grand Chamberlain because his "reformist plans had been wrecked."

== Later life ==
=== Farm life ===
Khả was worried about the future of his family as he did not accumulate much savings. He would have to rely on the paddy fields near his home. It was at this time, that Khả's wife, who was born to an agricultural family, helped him greatly. Khả was helped by neighbours who allowed him to rent more land from them without payment until he got a few good crops. Also, his ex-colleagues at the Imperial Court secretly sent him part of their salaries. This difficult period was important in the raising of his children. From a young age, the children were forced to work hard in the fields. Diệm, his third son, was required to work in the field when he was not in school. These lean years taught the Ngô Dinh children how to be frugal and not to desire wealth. During his episcopal ordination in 1938 as the third Vietnamese bishop, Khả's second son, Thục, recalled these difficult times that the family and especially his father had gone through. Thục compared his father's fate to that of the biblical character Job because "Like Job, he had lost everything – dignity, fortune, health during the good fight."

=== Rehabilitation ===
In the fall of 1919, Ngô Đình Khả was honoured by the Nguyễn Imperial Court. Emperor Khải Định restored to Kha the title of Great Scholar Assistant to the Throne with the permanent rank of Minister.

== Family ==
Upon Khả's death he left behind his wife, Anna Nguyễn Thị Thay, and their sons, Khôi, Thục, Diệm, Nhu, Cẩn and Luyện, and daughters, Giao, Hiep and Hoang. Khôi would later become a governor under French colonial authority but would be assassinated together with his son by the Việt Minh. Thục ended up becoming Vietnam's third ordained Catholic bishop. Diệm would become the first president of an independent South Vietnam and Nhu would help him in the running of the country. Hiep's son, Khả's grandson, Francis Xavier Nguyễn Văn Thuận became a Cardinal in the Catholic Church in 2001 and in 2017, he was named as Venerable by Pope Francis, opening up the road to possible sainthood.

=== Death ===
In January 1925, a few days before Tet, Khả suddenly began to run a high fever and cough. He was diagnosed with severe pneumonia with complications. He died at his home on 27 January 1925.

== Historical assessment of Ngô Đình Khả ==
Edward Miller claims that many people saw Khả was a "collaborator and an apologist for colonialism," because he worked in the French dominated court. However, he goes on to state that Khả was not a Francophile but was guided by "reformist ambitions" and that he believed that independence from France could only come about with reform in politics, society and culture. Kha believed that the Quốc Học that he established would help Vietnam achieve that growth and objective.

A contrasting understanding about Khả, which views him much more harshly comes from Seth Jacobs' America's Miracle Man in Vietnam. This study focuses much more on Ngô Đình Diệm and considers Khả to have been far colder with regards to his family than was previously known. He states that Khả was "not a nurturant or forgiving father." Edward Miller wrote that Khả was a "demanding father" and recounts a story of how Kha forced Diem to eat fish every Friday as was the Catholic tradition. However, Diệm had developed an allergy to fish and would throw up. Khả still demanded Diệm finish whatever was served.
