= Ngô Thế Linh =

South Vietnamese colonel (1928–1999)

Ngô Thế Linh (born 6 December 1928, Hà Tĩnh Province, Vietnam, French Indochina – died 25 February 1999) was a colonel in the Army of the Republic of Vietnam (ARVN), South Vietnam. He was the first Commander of Coastal Security Service (CSS). He was the commander of South Vietnam's Special Forces.

Linh graduated from Thủ Đức Military Infantry Officer Academy, Class Number 3 (in 1952) with General Nguyễn Khoa Nam. During the next twenty three years of service, he held key positions in Presidential Liaisons Services, Strategic Technical Directorate of the South Vietnamese Army. He was in charge of many important clandestine missions by land, by air and by sea to North Vietnam.

== Emigration and death ==
After the fall of Saigon in April 1975, Colonel Linh came to the United States with his family. They resided in San Jose, California. Line died on 25 February 1999, aged 70.

== Family ==
His grandfather, it is claimed, was in charge of ruling Vietnam for six months while Emperor Hàm Nghi was sent away and was under arrest by the French. Prime Minister Hoang resigned his post and retired early because he disagreed with the French Indochinese policy. A cousin was Cardinal François Xavier Nguyễn Văn Thuận of Huế. It is also claimed that his wife is a younger sister of John-Baptiste Nguyễn Bửu Đồng, a great grand-grandson of Emperor Minh Mang.
