= Ngô Đình Luyện =

Vietnamese diplomat (1914–1990)

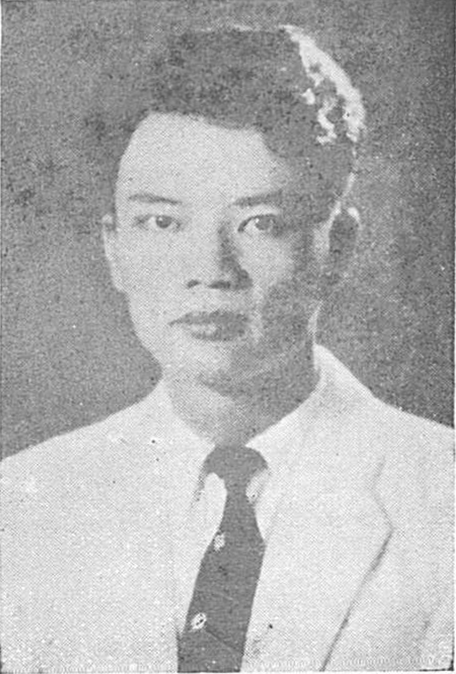
Portrait of Ngô Đình Luyện

Ngô Đình Luyện (1914 – 1990) was a Vietnamese diplomat.

He was one of six sons born to affluent Roman Catholic parents and also had three sisters. His father, Ngô Đình Khả, was a mandarin during the French colonial era. Luyện's brothers included Provincial Governor Ngô Đình Khôi, South Vietnamese President Ngô Đình Diệm and Pierre Martin Ngô Đình Thục, the Roman Catholic archbishop of Huế. Khôi was killed by Việt Minh insurgents in 1945, who reportedly buried him alive.

Diệm appointed Luyện as ambassador to the United Kingdom. Diệm and another brother, Ngô Đình Nhu, were executed on 2 November 1963 during a military coup. Another brother, Ngô Đình Cẩn, was captured a few days later and eventually sentenced to death and executed. Luyện was able to escape assassination because he was in London at the time.

Luyện and Thục were the only brothers to survive the political upheavals in Vietnam.
