= Khá Bảnh =

Vietnamese YouTuber, internet personality

- Born: Ngô Bá Khá; 27 November 1993 (age 32); Từ Sơn, Bắc Ninh, Vietnam
- Occupations: YouTuber; Amateur actor
- Known for: Internet phenomena
- Criminal charges: Illegal Gambling Drug abuse Intentional injuries
- Criminal penalty: 10½ years imprisonment
- Spouse: Unknown (m. 2013; div. 2017)

YouTube information
- Channels: Khá BảnH (terminated)
- Years active: 2014–2019
- Genres: Entertainment; Vlog; Music

Ngô Bá Khá (Vietnamese pronunciation: [ŋo˧˧ ʔɓaː˧˦ xaː˧˦]; born 27 November 1993), better known by his pseudonym Khá Bảnh (Vietnamese pronunciation: [xaː˧˦ ʔɓajŋ̟˧˩]; lit. 'quite handsome'), is a Vietnamese YouTuber, internet personality and amateur actor. He is known primarily for posting videos with controversial statements and content, as well as "múa quạt", (Note: "Múa quạt" (lit. 'fan dance'), also known as "helicopter dance".) which became a youth trend in Vietnam.

Throughout his career, Khá Bảnh has become the subject of many controversies due to his behavior and content of his YouTube channel, most notably a promotional video that featured a scene in which he and his friends burned a brand new scooter. On 2 April 2019, Khá Bảnh was arrested during a police raid and sentenced to 10.5 years in prison for illegal gambling. Immediately after Khá Bảnh was arrested, his YouTube channel, which at the time had more than 2 million subscribers, was terminated.

== Early life ==
Ngô Bá Khá was born on 27 November 1993, in Tam Sơn, a town in Từ Sơn, Bắc Ninh, Vietnam, as the youngest child and the only son to a family of four children. His mother is Nguyễn Thị Khánh (1956-2023) and his father–whose name is unknown–died in 2010.

Khá attended Elementary School and Middle School in his hometown Tam Sơn, but had to dropout at 7th grade due to reasons related to his family. Despite numerous attempts, the school committee and his class teacher could not convince him to go back to school. At the age of 14, Khá attempted to be a wood carpenter and worked in various jobs in the years that followed, until he was detained in Yên Mô Youth Detention Center, Ninh Binh at the age of 17 after being arrested and charged with assault. Shortly after his release in 2012, Khá Bảnh was again charged for the same reason and had to spend another 5-month sentence in jail. Upon returning home, he tried various jobs but ended up as a loan shark. However, Khá Bảnh later claimed that he was not involved in any illegal business.

== Internet career ==
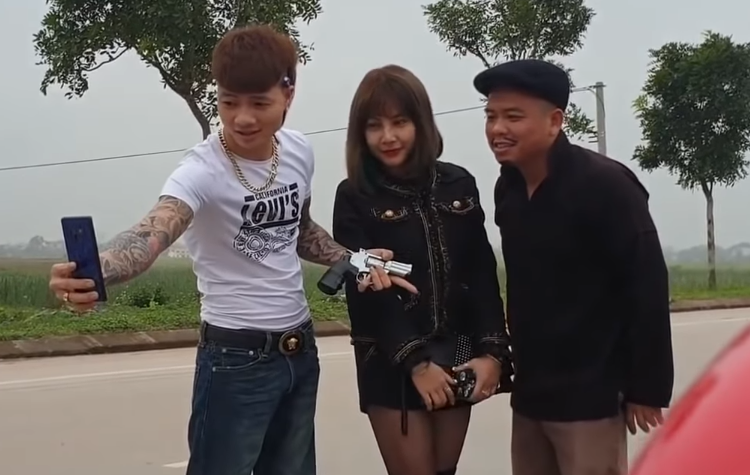
Khá Bảnh and Dương Minh Tuyền in the behind the scenes of the web drama Sóng gió cuộc đời

Khá Bảnh quickly rose to fame due to a series of videos–which he himself described as "funny"–about his life on his Facebook page, where he can be seen at work, partying or hanging out with his friends. He was also known for his unusual taste in clothing, as well as his hair–a variant of the mullet hairstyle. In 2017, after realizing that his videos had received a lot of attention from people, mostly teenagers, he decided to create his own YouTube channel. The channel grew rapidly within a few months of its creation. He then assembled his own camera team that help create "professional" videos depicting his giang hồ (gangster) life and to create a picture of him as a man of honor who possesses many moral principles such as trượng nghĩa ('from a sense of justice').

The disco dance-style "múa quạt", which was originally a dance move performed by G-Dragon in Big Bang's music video "Fantastic Baby", had become one of Khá Bảnh's trademarks. Because of him, this dance quickly became a trend in Vietnam and has been well received by a significant number of young people.

== Controversies ==
Despite his popularity, many people argue that his videos are inappropriate according to traditional Vietnamese values. Khá Bảnh often uploads violent videos showing his gangster life, which involve fighting or insulting other people. Many videos show him walking through the street with illegal weapons such as a machete or expandable baton. Despite that, he still made large sums of money from YouTube, estimated to be up to $20,000 per month, without any restrictions.

On 10 March 2019, Khá Bảnh posted group photos on Facebook showing him with his friends standing in a row on the Hanoi–Haiphong Expressway while leaving their cars on the side of the highway. The day after, Khá Bảnh was dragged to the police station, where he testified that he and his friends were taking a toilet break on their way home after attending a wedding in the neighboring Thái Bình Province and the group photos were thus "unintentional". Khá Bảnh subsequently had to pay a fine of VNĐ5.5 million (equivalent to $300 in 2025) and his driver's license was suspended for 2 months.

On 29 March 2019, Khá Bảnh uploaded a video that later turned out to be a promotional video showing him alongside a burnt Honda PCX scooter and suggested other people buy an electric motorbike that supposedly was cheaper to operate. His action was not welcome by most people and he was forced to remove the video that evening.

== Arrest ==
On 1 April 2019, Khá Bảnh was arrested during a police raid on allegations of using drugs, organizing gambling, and illegal money lending. His initial drug test resulted positive. While searching his home for further investigations, the police found various indications of illegal gambling, lottery and money lending. On 13 November 2019, he was sentenced to 10 years and 6 months in prison, along with a fine of VNĐ30 million for gambling and organizing gambling. During his trial, Khá Bảnh was cheered on by a large crowd gathered outside the district court of Từ Sơn, whom he promised that he would return after few years.

== Personal life ==
In 2013, Khá married a woman from his village, but the couple divorced in 2017. Shortly after Khá's arrest in 2019, while searching his home for evidence, the police met two women who claimed to be his wives. However, neither of them had a marriage certificate to prove their statements. Khá was allegedly in a relationship with a woman named Hương Dương since 2018. Not much is known about her other than she makes online sales on her Facebook page, which has grown significantly due to Khá's popularity. The current status of their relationship is unclear. However, there have been rumors that the couple split up after Khá Bảnh went to jail.
