= Emily Wu =

Chinese writer (born 1958)

- Born: Wu Yimao; 3 June 1958 (age 67); Beijing, China
- Occupation: Writer
- Years active: 2006–present
- Known for: Feather in the Storm: A Childhood Lost in Chaos
- Children: 2
- Website: https://www.encyclopedia.com/arts/educational-magazines/wu-emily-1958-wu-yimao

Emily Wu (巫一毛 Wu Yimao), born 3 June 1958 in Beijing, is a Chinese-American writer whose short stories have appeared in magazines and newspapers, and in an anthology of poetry and prose. She went to the United States in 1981 and has a Bachelor of Arts in English from Notre Dame de Namur University (formerly called College of Notre Dame) in Belmont, California, and an MBA from Golden Gate University in San Francisco, California.

In 2006 she published a memoir, Feather in the Storm: A Childhood Lost in Chaos (Pantheon, Random House) telling her story of growing up in China in a "black" (rightist) family during the Great Leap Forward and the Cultural Revolution. The book has been translated into German, French, Thai, Polish, Czech, Finnish, Chinese, Danish, and Hungarian. The book is a counterpart to the memoir written by her father, the well known translator and writer Wu Ningkun, who was denounced as an ultra-rightist during the late '50s.

Emily Wu is also a featured subject, together with Shi Tianjian and Yan Yunxiang, in Chris Billing's 2005 documentary Up to the Mountain, Down to the Village. From 1968 onwards more than 17 million high school students and young adults were sent "up to the mountain, down to the village" (上山下乡 shang shan, xia xiang) to "learn from the peasants." In the documentary three of those youngsters revisit the remote villages to which they were sent thirty years ago.
