= Ngô Đình Cẩn =

South Vietnamese politician/warlord

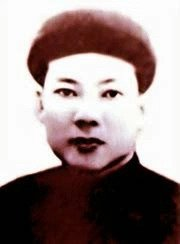

Counsellor of Trung Phần (South Vietnam)
- In office 26 October 1955 – 2 November 1963
- President: Ngo Dinh Diem
- Vice President: Nguyễn Ngọc Thơ
- Preceded by: Position established
- Succeeded by: Position abolished

Personal details
- Born: 1911 Phủ Cam Cathedral, Huế, French Indochina
- Died: 9 May 1964 (aged 52–53) Saigon, South Vietnam
- Cause of death: Execution by shooting
- Occupation: Member of the Diệm government
- Known for: Younger brother and confidant of South Vietnam's first president, Ngô Đình Diệm

Ngô Đình Cẩn (Vietnamese: [ŋo˧ ɗɨ̞̠n˦˩ kəŋ˦˩]; 1911 – 9 May 1964) was the younger brother and confidant of South Vietnam's first president, Ngô Đình Diệm, and an important member of the Diệm government. Diệm put Cẩn in charge of central Vietnam, stretching from Phan Thiết in the south to the border at the 17th parallel, with Cẩn ruling the region as a virtual dictator. Based in the former imperial capital of Huế, Cẩn operated private armies and secret police that controlled the central region and earned himself a reputation as the most oppressive of the Ngô brothers.

In his youth, Cẩn was a follower of the nationalist Phan Bội Châu. In the late 1940s and early 1950s, he worked to organise support for Diệm as various Vietnamese groups and international powers sought to stamp their authority over Vietnam. Cẩn, who succeeded in eliminating alternative nationalist opposition in central Vietnam, became the warlord of the region when his brother became president of the southern half of the partitioned nation in 1955. He became notorious for his involvement in smuggling and corruption, as well as his autocratic rule. Cẩn was regarded as an effective leader against the Viet Cong communist insurgency, which was much weaker in central Vietnam than in other parts of South Vietnam. His Popular Force militia was regarded by US officials in central Vietnam as a successful counter to the communists.

Cẩn's influence began to wane after his elder brother Ngô Đình Thục was appointed the Roman Catholic Archbishop of Huế. Thục overshadowed Cẩn and aggressively promoted Catholicism, which led to the banning of the Buddhist flag in 1963 during Vesak, the celebration of the birthday of Gautama Buddha. Cẩn's forces opened fire on a crowd who were protesting the ban, killing nine and precipitating the Buddhist crisis. Ongoing demonstrations intensified throughout the summer as the regime responded with increased brutality, sparking the toppling of the Diệm regime in a November 1963 coup. Cẩn had been offered asylum by the US Department of State, but ambassador Henry Cabot Lodge Jr. had CIA officer Lucien Conein arrest the fallen Ngô in Saigon. Cẩn was turned over to the military junta, which tried and executed him in 1964.

== Early years ==
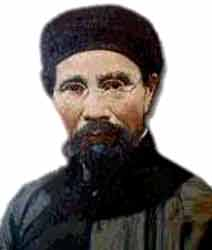
In his youth, Cẩn was a follower of famed anti-French nationalist Phan Bội Châu (pictured).

Cẩn was the fifth of six sons born to Ngô Đình Khả, who was a mandarin in the imperial court of Emperor Thành Thái, who was ruling under French control.

Khả retired from the court in protest at French interference, taking up farming. Cẩn's first and third brothers – Ngô Đình Khôi and Diệm – rose to become provincial governors under French rule. Diệm, like his father, resigned in protest in 1933, while Khôi was assassinated in 1945 by Hồ Chí Minh's cadres. The second brother, Pierre Martin Ngô Đình Thục, was appointed as the Roman Catholic Archbishop of Huế. A fourth brother Ngô Đình Nhu became the family's chief political strategist, while the youngest, Ngô Đình Luyện was a diplomat when the family held power in South Vietnam. Of the Ngô brothers, only Thục and Luyện avoided being executed or assassinated during Vietnam's political upheavals.

Details about Cẩn's early life are scarce. In his youth, he had studied the writings and opinions of the renowned anti-French Vietnamese nationalist Phan Bội Châu, who spent his last years in Huế. Regarded as the leading revolutionary of his time, Châu had been captured and sentenced to death, before having his sentence reduced to house arrest. Cẩn regularly traveled to Châu's sampan on the Perfume River with gifts of food and listened to Châu's political lectures. Regarded as the least educated of his family, Cẩn had never traveled outside Vietnam and was the only Ngô brother not to have studied at a European-run institution.

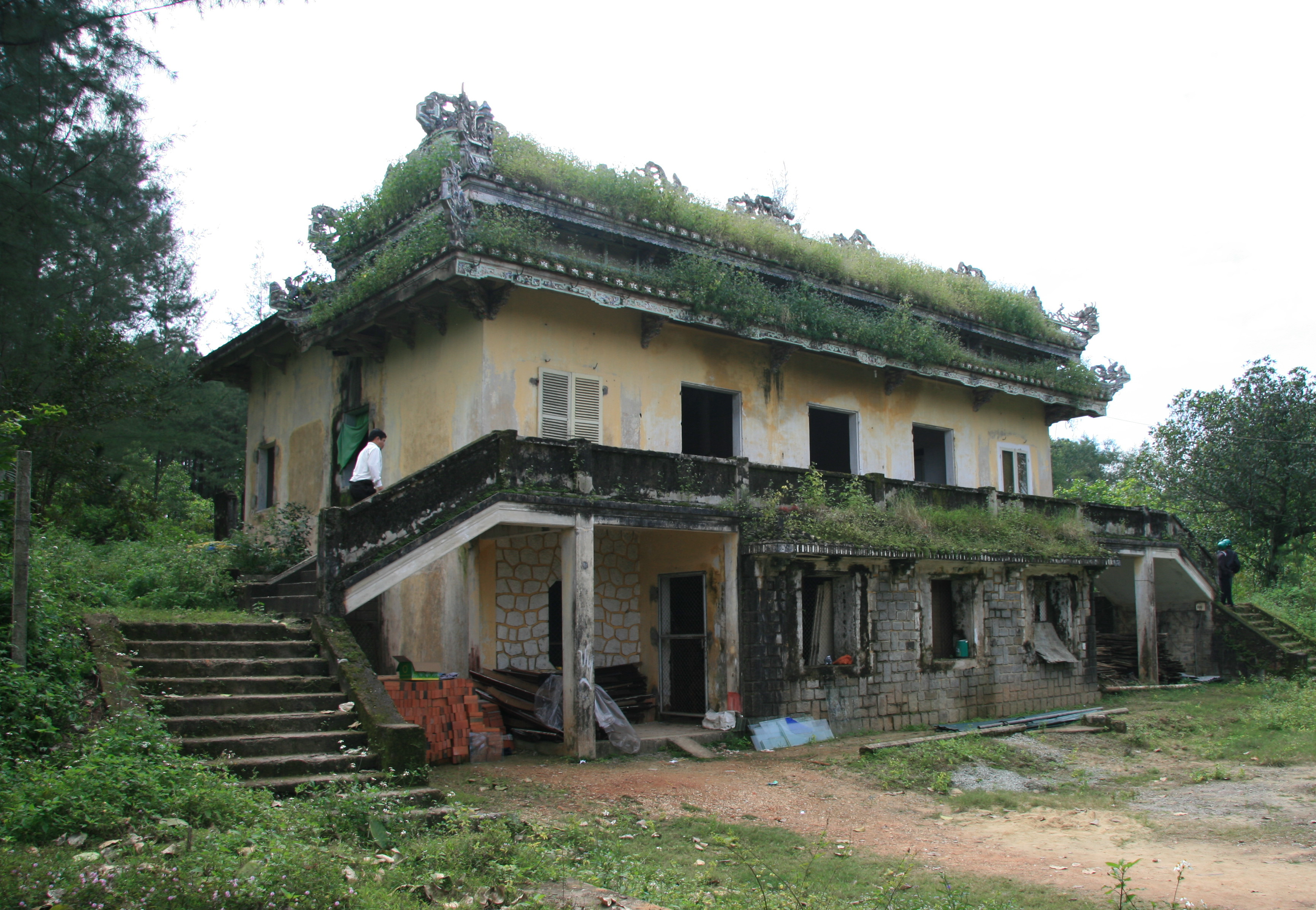
Remnants of Ngo Dinh Can's villa in Ngu Tay, Thuy An, Hue city.

Vietnam was in chaos after the Japanese invaded the country during World War II and displaced the French colonial administration. At the end of the war, the Japanese left the country, and France, severely weakened by political turmoil within the Vichy regime, was unable to exert control. Hồ Chí Minh's Viet Minh declared independence as the Democratic Republic of Vietnam and battled other Vietnamese nationalist groups as well as French forces for control of the nation. During this time, Cẩn organised a clandestine support base for Diệm in central Vietnam. At the time, Diệm was one of many nationalists who were attempting to stake a claim to national leadership, having spent a decade in self-imposed exile from public affairs. Cẩn helped weaken other anti-communist nationalist groups, such as the Việt Nam Quốc Dân Đảng (Vietnamese Nationalist Party) and the Đại Việt Quốc Dân Đảng (Nationalist Party of Greater Vietnam), which competed with Diệm for support. On 23 October 1955, Diệm toppled Bảo Đại in a fraud-ridden referendum orchestrated by Nhu. Diệm declared himself President of the newly proclaimed Republic of Vietnam three days later.

Cẩn's men helped to cower the populace into voting for his brother. Those who disobeyed were often chased down and beaten, with pepper sauce and water often forced down their nostrils. The violations were particularly flagrant in Cẩn's area, which was the home of the Nguyễn dynasty and a source of sympathy towards Bảo Đại. Cẩn ordered the police to arrest 1,200 people for political reasons in the week leading up to the vote. In Hội An, some people were killed in election day violence.

== Rule ==
With Diệm's ascent to the leadership of South Vietnam in 1955, Cẩn's stock rose. Cẩn had no formal position in the government but was effectively regarded as the warlord of central Vietnam. He had almost unlimited power in the region, often interfering with army operations against the Viet Cong in a style described as "feudal". Robert Scigliano, a journalist and academic from the Michigan State University Vietnam Advisory Group, asserted that Cẩn, along with Nhu, Madame Nhu and eldest brother Archbishop Pierre Martin Ngô Đình Thục formed "an extralegal elite which, with Diệm, directs the destiny of Vietnam". Cẩn sometimes vetoed government-appointed officials posted to central Vietnam from Saigon.

Cẩn ran his own personal army and secret police, which fought the Viet Cong and imprisoned other anti-communist political opponents. Cẩn accumulated great wealth through corrupt practices such as graft in awarding foreign aid contracts from the United States governments of Dwight D. Eisenhower and John F. Kennedy to Vietnamese businessmen. He required the businessmen to pay a fee to the National Revolutionary Movement – the official party of the regime – in return for the processing of applications for foreign aid contracts and import licenses. Cẩn was widely believed to be selling rice to North Vietnam on the black market, as well as organising the trafficking of opium throughout Asia via Laos, and monopolising the cinnamon trade.

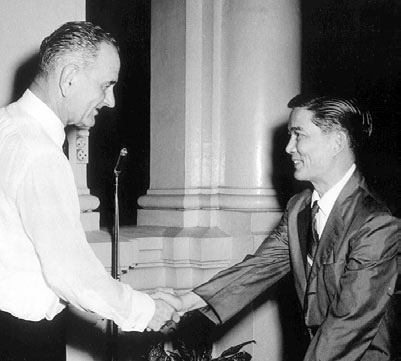
Ngô Đình Nhu (right), shaking hands with US Vice President Lyndon B. Johnson

He was often in conflict with his brothers regarding internal matters, with Nhu, Diệm's most influential adviser, controlling the southern part of the country. The brothers often competed with each other for US aid contracts and the rice trade, but did not interfere with matters in one another's territorial zone. Cẩn had once tried to set up an office for his secret police in Saigon (which was in Nhu's southern region) by showing Diệm his long list of detained political opponents, but insisted that he not have to report to Nhu. He brutally suppressed dissent by using torture and re-education camps to achieve his aims. Comparing Cẩn to his brothers, Scigliano said that he was "also considered the most severe, some would say primitive, member of the family and he rules his domain with a strict and sometimes brutal hand". Referring to his autocratic style, a Vietnamese critic said that unlike Diệm, Cẩn was consistent and left his followers in no doubt as to what he wanted: "They are not confused by double talk about democratic ideals and institutions". His creation of a well-defined system of incentives and deterrence has been cited as one reason for his success.

== Anti-communism ==
In spite of his autocracy and iron rule, Cẩn earned praise from Huế-based US officials for his relatively high levels of success against the Cong san insurgency. Cẩn's central region was much more peaceful than the restive areas near Saigon and the Mekong Delta. Cẩn created the Popular Force organisation to operate in central Vietnam. The Popular Force was an alternative to the Strategic Hamlet Program which was used on a much larger scale in the south by Nhu, who moved peasants into fortified camps in an attempt to isolate Viet Cong cadres from accessing the rural populace and intimidating or otherwise gaining their support. Cẩn assumed a third or so of the rural peasantry were Viet Cong sympathisers, significant enough to render the hamlets ineffective by intimidating other villagers from within. Cẩn's Popular Force were a group of volunteers who underwent rigorous training similar to United States Marine Corps Recruit Training. Those who passed the training were put into units of 150 men and assigned to live and work in the villages by day. At night, they did defence patrols, using hit-and-run tactics against the Viet Cong. According to the report by US officials in central Vietnam, the program aroused popular support because of the integration of the Popular Force's personnel into the daily life of the village and the sense of security that the force provided. The units were generally regarded as being successful in their six-month deployments, allowing them to be deployed to the next trouble spot. Officials in Washington disagreed with the assessment of their subordinates in central Vietnam, alleging that Cẩn was mainly using the Popular Force for repressing dissidents.

== Buddhist crisis ==
Cẩn was considered the most secular of the four Ngô brothers who controlled Vietnam's domestic affairs. With the appointment of elder brother Thục as the Archbishop of Huế in 1961, Cẩn became less influential as Thục aggressively blurred the distinction between church and state. In early 1963, Nhu sent an emissary from Saigon telling Cẩn to retire and leave for Japan. Unrest erupted in the summer of 1963. After the flying of Vatican flags was permitted at a celebration for the anniversary of Thục's consecration as a bishop, the flying of Buddhist flags on 8 May to commemorate Vesak – the birth of Gautama Buddha – was banned. Cẩn's subordinates ordered government forces to fire on the unarmed Buddhist crowd protesting the ban, killing nine. Cẩn believed the United States, whose relations with South Vietnam had become strained, caused an explosion during the Vesak shootings, to destabilise his family's regime.

Another notable religious incident occurred in the central region under Cẩn's rule in 1963. An oversized carp was found swimming in a small pond near the central city of Đà Nẵng. Local Buddhists began to believe that the fish was a reincarnation of one of Gautama Buddha's disciples. As pilgrimages to the pond became larger and more frequent, so did disquiet among Cẩn's district chief and his subordinates. The local law enforcement agencies mined the pond, but the fish survived. They raked the pond with machine gun fire, but the fish again survived. To deal with the tenacious fish, they called in the Army of the Republic of Vietnam Special Forces, led by Colonel Lê Quang Tung under the direction of Nhu. The grenading of the pond finally killed the carp. The killing had the unintended effect of increasing the public profile of the carp, with newspapers across the world running stories about the miraculous fish. Army of the Republic of Vietnam (ARVN) helicopters began landing at the site, with paratroopers filling their bottles with water that they believed to be magical.

== Downfall and arrest ==
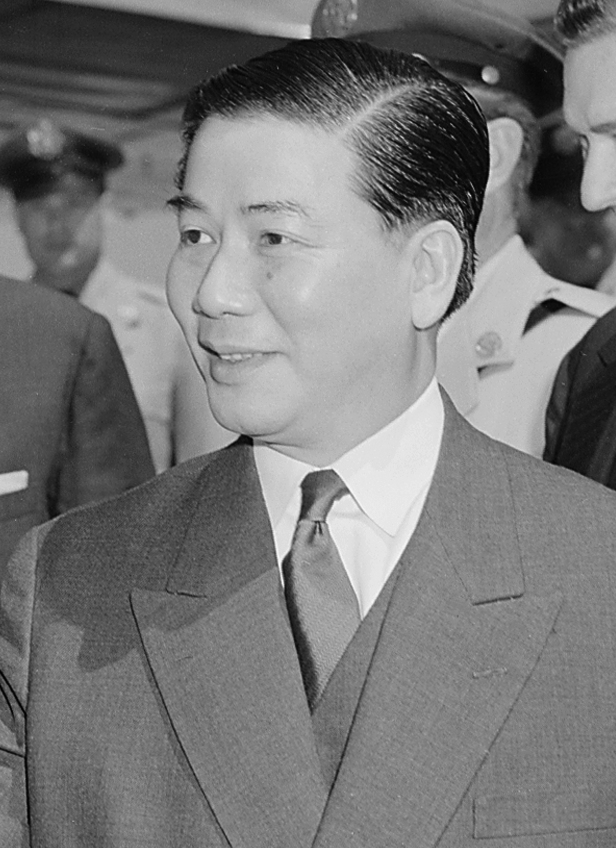
Cẩn's brother, President Ngô Đình Diệm

Sparked by the killings in Huế on Vesak, the Buddhists organised nationwide mass protests against the religious bias of the Diệm regime throughout the summer of 1963, demanding religious equality. The protests were met with brutal crackdowns, including ARVN Special Forces attacks on Buddhist pagodas which left hundreds missing, presumed dead. As public discontent heightened, a group of ARVN officers planned and carried out a US-backed coup in November. This came about after Cẩn's protégé Tôn Thất Đính switched sides and helped the coup when his corps was expected to remain loyal. Diệm and Nhu were executed at the conclusion of the coup.

Following the downfall of the Ngô family, the White House came under pressure from the South Vietnamese public to take a hard line against Cẩn. Mass graves containing 200 bodies were found on his land. The US consul in Huế, John Helble, confirmed the existence of rows of 18th-century style dungeons with filthy, dark cells in an old French arsenal. Although junta member General Trần Văn Đôn asserted that the compound predated the Diệm era, the town's citizens saw Cẩn as a mass murderer. On 4 November, two days after the coup ended, thousands of irate townspeople walked three kilometres to Cẩn's house on the city's southern outskirts – where he lived with his aged mother – demanding vengeance. The junta had ringed the home with barbed wire and armoured cars, sensing that the populace would riot and attack Cẩn. By this time, Cẩn had escaped to a Catholic seminary, but was considering applying to the Americans for political asylum. The US State Department was faced with a dilemma: sheltering Cẩn would associate them with the protection of a corrupt and authoritarian regime that had tortured and killed thousands of its own people. Allowing Cẩn to be attacked by angry mobs would damage the reputation of the new American-backed junta. The State Department instructed:

asylum should be granted to Ngo Dinh Can if he is in physical danger from any source. If asylum granted explain to Hue authorities further violence would harm international reputation new regime. Also recall to them that U.S. took similar action to protect Thich Tri Quang from the Diệm government and can do no less in Can case.

The White House sent a cable to the US Embassy, Saigon on 4 November agreeing that Cẩn and his mother needed evacuation. General Đỗ Cao Trí, the commander of the ARVN I Corps, who had repressed the Buddhists in Huế, privately told Cẩn that the junta would allow him safe passage out of Vietnam. On 5 November, Cẩn sought refuge at the US consulate with a suitcase crammed with US currency. Trí was then told that Cẩn was not safe in Huế and that he was to send Cẩn to Saigon immediately for his own protection. Trí would only promise safe passage in an American plane to Saigon, where embassy officials would meet Cẩn. On the journey to the capital, Cẩn was accompanied by four Americans: a vice-consul, two military policemen and a lieutenant colonel. He had intended to seek asylum in Japan.

US ambassador Henry Cabot Lodge, Jr. had other ideas. Instead of sending embassy officials to Tân Sơn Nhứt airport, Lodge sent CIA officer Lucien Conein, who had helped the Vietnamese generals to plan the coup. Conein turned Cẩn over to the junta. Lodge said that General Đôn had promised that Cẩn would be dealt with "legally and judicially". The ambassador told Washington that asylum was unnecessary, saying "It seems to me that our reason for giving him asylum therefore no longer exists". He said that the US could not interfere with justice, since Cẩn was "undoubtedly a reprehensible figure who deserves all the loathing which he now receives". Lodge reasoned that since Cẩn would not be killed, protecting him would give the impression that the US backed his activities. Lodge said that General Dương Văn Minh, who was the President, implied that Cẩn would receive clemency even if sentenced to death. This contradicted Conein's assertion that the ARVN officer corps felt that Cẩn should be executed. Cẩn's case was damaged by the release of tens of thousands of political prisoners, who recounted tales of torture at the hands of the Ngô brothers.

== Trial and execution ==
It was reported that General Nguyễn Khánh – who had deposed Minh in a January 1964 coup – offered Cẩn exile if he handed over his foreign bank deposits. Cẩn protested, saying that he had no money. Đôn later claimed that Khánh would have executed Cẩn anyway, as Cẩn would have known of the corruption that the generals were party to. During the Ngô era, Khánh commanded the ARVN II Corps, which had operated in the Central Highlands under Cẩn's supervision. Despite having helped to arrest Cẩn, Lodge advised Khánh to be restrained in his handling of the case for fear of stoking religious resentment or upsetting international opinion with a death penalty.

Lodge later claimed the South Vietnamese prosecutors failed to make any case against Cẩn. The Vietnamese leader also had to contend with the other side of the arguments, from those who considered themselves to be victims of the Diệm regime. During the trial, Thích Trí Quang, along with other opponents of the old regime, lobbied for a death sentence for Cẩn. He argued that if Cẩn lived, he could regain power along with his late brothers' supporters. He told Lodge that if the Americans did not support a tough sentence, then the Vietnamese Buddhist community's opinion of Washington would fall. Lodge was initially critical of Quang's campaigning against Cẩn. Cẩn was sentenced to death. He appealed to the head of state for clemency; his lawyers used a provision in the legal code to make the appeal. This placed Minh – who was still the titular head of state – in the position of approving a third death in the Ngô family, having already ordered his bodyguard Nguyễn Văn Nhung to execute Diệm and Nhu during the coup.

Cẩn's diabetes worsened during the course of the trial, and by the time he was executed, his elderly mother had died. He suffered a heart attack while in custody. On 9 May 1964, he was carried on a stretcher into the prison courtyard and assisted by guards and two Catholic priests to stand alongside the post to which he was tied. He was blindfolded against his request and shot in front of approximately 200 observers. Lodge defended his actions, claiming the United States did all it could to prevent the execution. The ambassador claimed Cẩn would have been allowed to seek refuge at the US embassy, despite the fact that he had ordered Conein to intercept Cẩn at the airport. Rev. Cao Văn Luân, Catholic rector of Huế University who had been fired for falling afoul of the powerful Archbishop Thục, asked Lodge that Cẩn not be executed. According to Luân, Lodge reportedly assured the rector the execution would not take place. Cẩn left his personal fortune, which had indeed been deposited in foreign banks, to Catholic charities.

== Sources ==
- Buttinger, Joseph (1967). Vietnam: A Dragon Embattled. New York: Praeger Publishers.
- Hammer, Ellen J. (1987). A Death in November: America in Vietnam, 1963. New York: E. P. Dutton. ISBN 0-525-24210-4.
- Jacobs, Seth (2006). Cold War Mandarin: Ngo Dinh Diem and the Origins of America's War in Vietnam, 1950–1963. Lanham, Maryland: Rowman & Littlefield. ISBN 0-7425-4447-8.
- Jones, Howard (2003). Death of a Generation: how the assassinations of Diem and JFK prolonged the Vietnam War. New York: Oxford University Press. ISBN 0-19-505286-2.
- Karnow, Stanley (1997). Vietnam: A History. New York: Penguin Books. ISBN 0-670-84218-4.
- Langguth, A. J. (2000). Our Vietnam: the war, 1954–1975. New York: Simon & Schuster. ISBN 0-684-81202-9.
- McAllister, James (2008). "'Only Religions Count in Vietnam': Thich Tri Quang and the Vietnam War". Modern Asian Studies. 42 (4). New York: Cambridge University Press: 751–82. doi:10.1017/s0026749x07002855. S2CID 145595067.
- Miller, Edward (2004). Grand Designs, Vision, Power and Nation Building in America's Alliance with Ngo Dinh Diem, 1954–1960. UMI.
- Prochnau, William (1995). Once upon a Distant War. New York: Times Books. ISBN 0-8129-2633-1.
- Scigliano, Robert (1964). South Vietnam: Nation Under Stress. Boston, Massachusetts: Houghton Mifflin.
- Tucker, Spencer C. (2000). Encyclopedia of the Vietnam War: A Political, Social and Military History. Santa Barbara, California: ABC-CLIO. ISBN 1-57607-040-9.
