= Mỹ Hào (town) =

Mỹ Hào town Thị xã Mỹ Hào Địch Lâm đạo
- Town (Class-III)
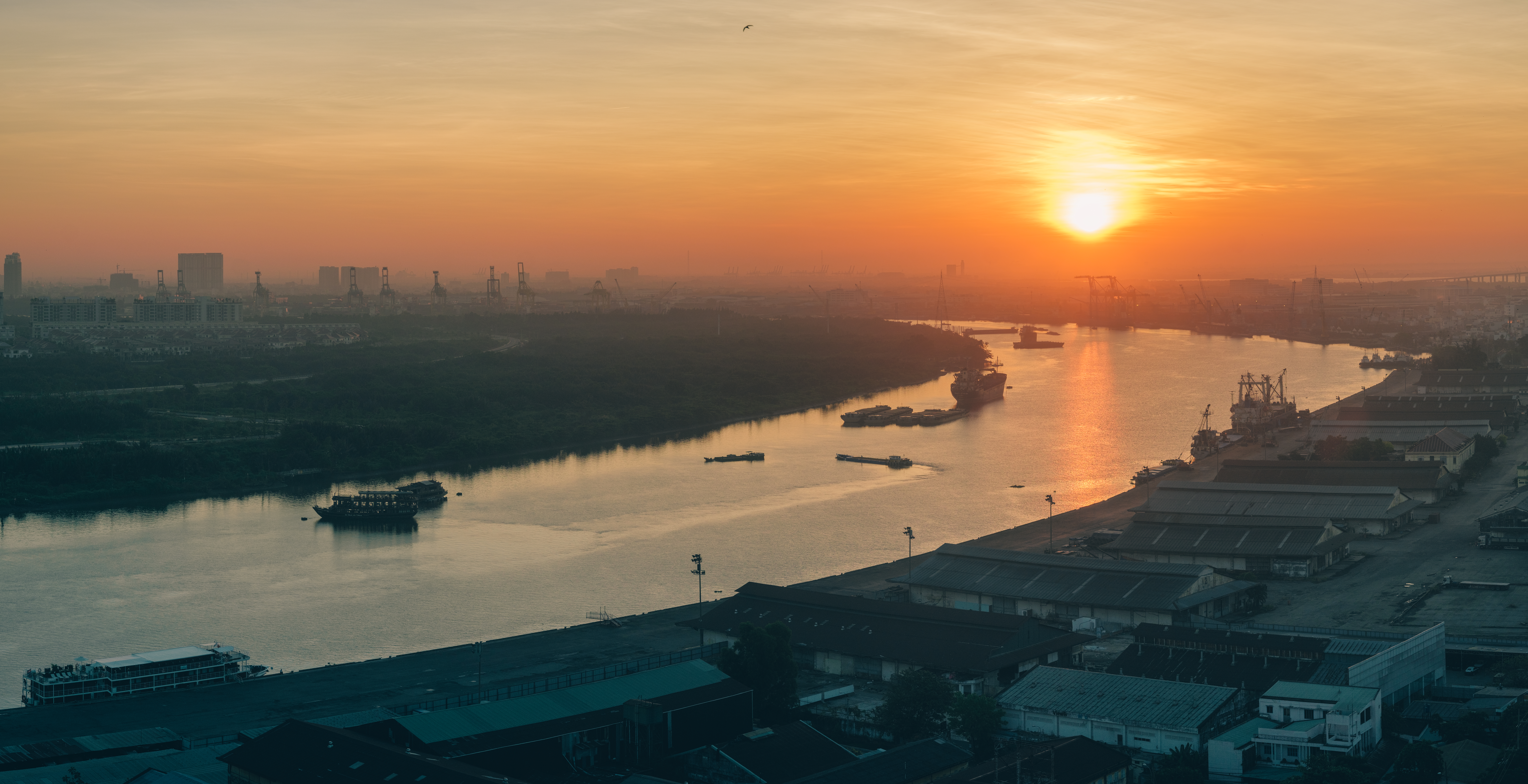
- Sunset on the river of Mỹ Hào.
- Nickname: "The Dream Wharf" (Bến mộng)
- Interactive map outlining Mỹ Hào town.
- Location within Vietnam Location within Southeast Asia Location within Asia
- Coordinates: 20°56′07″N 106°07′03″E
- Country: Vietnam
- Region: Red River Delta
- Province: Hưng Yên
- Establishment: IX century
- Central hall: No.23, Nguyễn Thiện Thuật Street, Văn Nhuế Resident Group, Bần Yên Nhân Ward

Government
  - Type: Town
  - People Committee's Chairman: Lê Quang Hiến
  - People Council's chairman: Đào Quang Minh
  - Front Committee's chairman: Trần Thị Thanh Thủy
  - Party Committee's Secretary: Trần Thị Thanh Thủy

Area
  - Town (Class-III): 79.36 km^{2} (30.64 sq mi)
  - Urban: 40.83 km^{2} (15.76 sq mi)

Population (2020)
  - Town (Class-III): 115,608
  - Density: 1,456/km^{2} (3,770/sq mi)
  - Urban: 69,162
  - Urban density: 1,694/km^{2} (4,387/sq mi)
  - Metro: 46,446
  - Ethnicities: Kinh; Tanka
- Time zone: UTC+7 (Indochina Time)
- ZIP code: 17500 (Note: An official code from December 31, 2022, to present.)
- Website: Myhao.Hungyen.gov.vn; Myhao.Hungyen.dcs.vn

Mỹ Hào [miʔi˧˥:ha̤ːw˨˩] is a former district-level town of Hưng Yên province in the Red River Delta of Vietnam.

== History ==
=== Middle Ages ===
According to Đại Nam nhất thống địa dư chí, around the ninth century, on the left bank of the Red River, there was an administrative unit called Đường-Hào huyện (Note: 阮朝時，美豪市社名為唐豪縣。) (唐豪縣; lit. 'Đường Hào rural district'), which was under Annam Prefecture of the Southern Tang dynasty. Its name implies emphasizing the central government's opening of the remaining lands.

Until 1885, Emperor Đồng Khánh immediately after the golden throne changed the name of Đường-Hào huyện to Mỹ-Hào huyện (Note: 同慶年間，避同慶帝諱，改為美豪縣。) (美豪縣; lit. 'Mỹ Hào rural district'). The decree was issued because the rural district's name happened to coincide with the Emperor's alias Chánh-Mông đường (Note: 漢字寫法來自《同慶地輿志》。) (正蒙堂; lit. 'Chánh Mông hall') in Annamese pronunciation.

Also in 1885, there was a serious storm throughout Hưng Yên province which caused the Red River dike to fail. All districts along the river were flooded, making the terrain almost uninhabitable. The southern part of Hưng Yên province went from having a large population for many centuries to becoming a swamp with insignificant population density. A low-ranking official named Nguyễn Thiện Thuật relied on this factor to urge his relatives as well as the Sơn Nam people to oppose the protecture government. This event is known as the Bãi Sậy Uprising (khởi nghĩa Bãi Sậy; 荻林起義; lit. 'the uprising at the Field of Reeds'), whose name originated from the area's typical flora for many years after the flood.

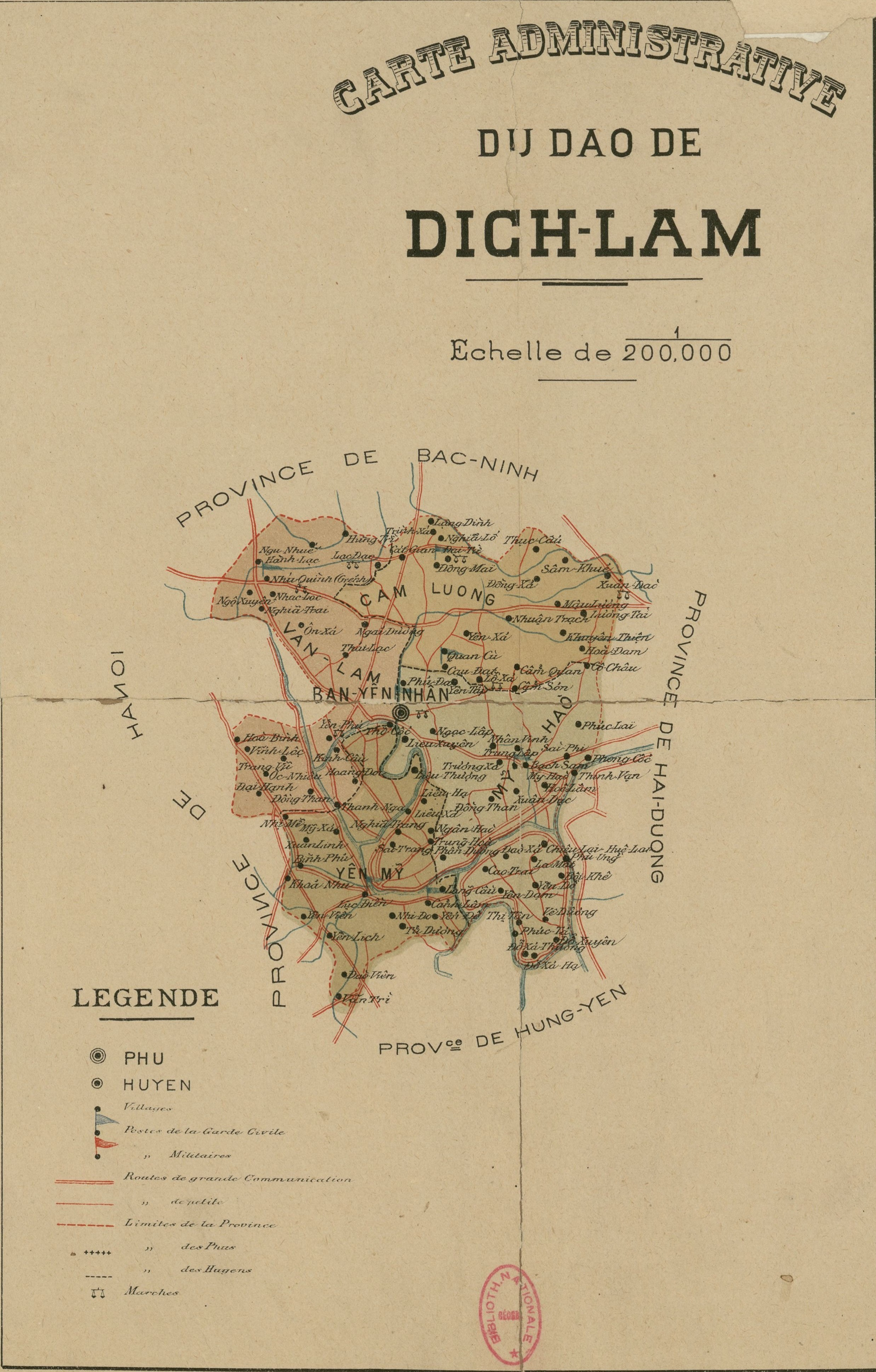
Map of the "Địch Lâm đạo".

On February 25, 1890, to deal with the uprising movement in the East of Hanoi, Governor-General Jean-Luc de Saint Peauxpa has signed a decision to merge all the Red Riverside rural districts of the three provinces Bắc Ninh, Hưng Yên and Hải Dương to form a new administrative unit : Địch-Lâm đạo (Bãi Sậy garrison; 荻林道). Accordingly, this territory was organized according to the regulation as a special military zone, whose head was required to be a French colonel (quan năm vành vàng, 'fifth-level official with golden lines'). Since this time, Mỹ Hào rural district has been separated into two districts, Mỹ Hào and Yên Mỹ.

In 1891, right after the revolt movement was defeated, the Governor-General restored civil administrative regulations, but the two districts of Mỹ Hào and Yên Mỹ still exist.

=== 20th century ===
After the First World War, the huyện (rural district) regulations were abolished throughout French Indochina, to be replaced by the quận (district or canton). The locality has been called Mỹ-Hào quận (美豪郡, 'Mỹ Hào district') in Annamese since then.

During the peak of the independent advocacy movement for Vietnamese people, while Hải Dương and Hải Phòng were considered as the bases of Vietnam Nationalist Party and Daiviet Nationalist Party, Hưng Yên was like the area of Việt Minh forces. Communists continued to take advantage of the low humid terrain of Mỹ Hào district to operate secretly. (Note: Hà Ân (Hứa Khắc Ân), Nắng Hưng Yên (Hưng Yên Sunshine), Nhà xuất bản Phụ Nữ (Women's Publishing House), Hà Nội, Việt Nam, 1967.)

Until 1946 the Vietnam National Assembly issued a decision to restore the huyện regulation. Therefore, this locality has been called huyện Mỹ-Hào ('Mỹ Hào rural district') in administrative documents.

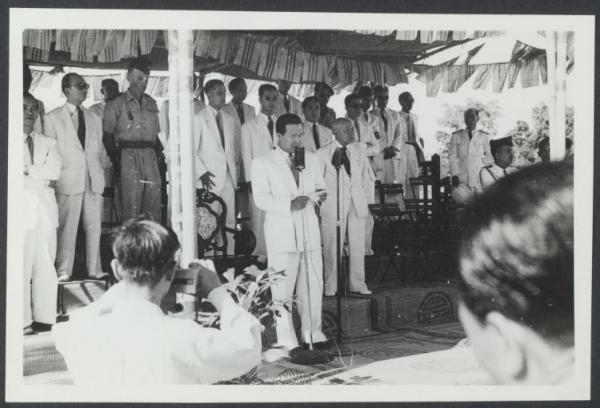
His Majesty Bảo Đại solaced people in Bần Yên Nhân township on September 20, 1949.

When the First Indochina War broke out, Bần Yên Nhân township (thị trấn Bần Yên Nhân) and its surrounding areas were almost placed in a curfew situation because of motor vehicle ambushes by Việt Minh guerrilla groups. The accident was particularly serious in 1951, when guerrillas strengthened sabotage activities to respond to the North-West Campaigns. The French Far East Expeditionary Corps had to mobilize several airborne and tanks to deal with the hope of being able to keep the security for Hanoi. (Note: British Pathé's 1951 reportage films : Việt Minh rebels attack Indo-China, French troops parachute into Vietnam to fight Việt Minh, [...].)

On March 11, 1977, the Council of Ministers issued Decision 58/CP consolidated a number of rural districts of Hải Hưng province. Accordingly, the two rural districts of Mỹ Hào and Văn Lâm were consolidated into Văn Mỹ rural district (huyện Văn Mỹ; 文美縣).

On March 24, 1979, the Council of Ministers issued Decision 70/CP to adjust the boundaries of rural districts of Hải Hưng province. Accordingly, Văn Mỹ district merged with 14 communes in Văn Yên district to establish a new unit, named Mỹ Văn rural district (huyện Mỹ Văn; 美文縣).

By September 1, 1999, Mỹ Hào rural district was re-established under Decree 60/NĐ-CP of the Central Government.

=== 21st century ===
On December 30, 2014, the Ministry of Construction issued Decision 1588/QĐ-BXD recognizing Bần Yên Nhân expanded township (including old Bần Yên Nhân township and five communes—Nhân Hòa, Dị Sử, Phùng Chí Kiên, Bạch Sam, Minh Đức—and part of Phan Đình Phùng commune) as a grade IV urban area.

On April 11, 2017, the whole Mỹ Hào rural district was recognized as a grade IV urban area. While waiting for the announcement of the official planning map, the locality was temporarily called Mỹ Hào township (thị trấn Mỹ Hào; 美豪市鎮) in administrative documents.

On March 13, 2019, the Standing Committee of the Vietnam National Assembly issued Resolution 656/NQ-UBTVQH14, which took effect on May 1, 2019. According to this decision, Mỹ Hào town (thị xã Mỹ Hào; 美豪市社) was officially established, based on the entire natural area and population of the old rural district.

== Geography ==
=== Administration ===
Mỹ Hào town includes 13 administrative units :

- Seven wards : Bạch Sam, Bần Yên Nhân (or Phố Bần), Dị Sử, Minh Đức, Nhân Hòa, Phan Đình Phùng, Phùng Chí Kiên.
- Six communes : Cẩm Xá, Dương Quang, Hòa Phong, Hưng Long, Ngọc Lâm, Xuân Dục.

According to the 2020 statistical yearbook of the whole province, Mỹ Hào town covers an area of 79.37 km^{2} (30.64 sq mi). However, due to landslides, which was caused by illegal sand-mining activities in the Red Riverside, the size has declined slowly since the early 2010s.

The terrain of the town is generally relatively flat, with a shape similar to a triangle. Currently, national routes 5, 38 and 39 go through the locality.

=== Population ===
The population of the town is fully registered as Kinh people.

According to the 2024 yearbook of the Thái Bình Cathedral Diocese, the Superiors decided to divide the Hưng Yên Deanery into two new deaneries Đông Hưng Yên and Tây Hưng Yên from 2014, taking the National Route 39B as the boundary. Accordingly, the territory of Mỹ Hào town is part of the Đông Hưng Yên Deanery (giáo hạt Đông Hưng Yên). It is often considered one of the traditional addresses of famous religious orders. Currently, the patron saint of the deanery is Saint Peter the Apostle.

== Culture ==
Throughout history, Bần Yên Nhân (貧安仁) was the only urban of Mỹ Hào district, even there were times when it has a very important position in the identity of Hưng Yên province.

The township was originally formed on the area of the two markets Phố Bần and Phố Nối, then gradually expanded to the whole district. The name of Bần Yên Nhân corresponds to a ward (phường) of Mỹ Hào town.

In addition, in the area of Mỹ Hào town there are two famous families, Nguyễn Thiện and Nguyễn Lân.

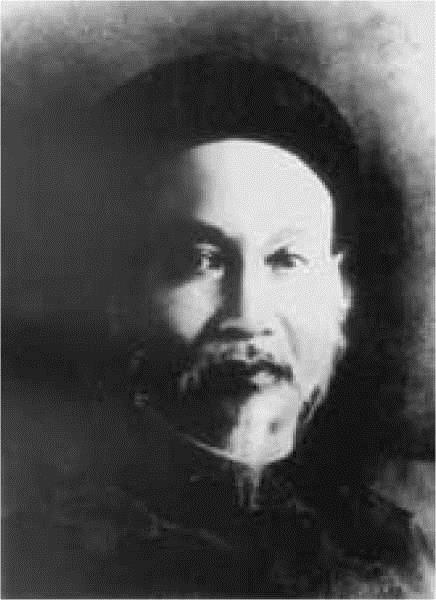
Official Phạm Văn Thụ (1886–1930).

- Official Nguyễn Thiện Thuật (1844–1926) and his relatives Nguyễn Thiện Kế, Nguyễn Thiện Dương, Nguyễn Thiện Tuyển were the leaders of the Bãi Sậy Uprising.
- Professor Nguyễn Lân (1906–2003), has seven sons and one daughter. They were all professors and university lecturers. One of his grandchildren, architect Nguyễn Lân Thắng, is a dissident and human rights activist, who was imprisoned by the Vietnamese government in 2023 for allegations of disturbance and overthrowing the regime.
- Vũ Trọng Phụng, a journalist and writer.
- Trần Phương, the Vice Prime-Minister.
- Lê Quý Quỳnh, the Deputy-Minister of Agriculture.
- Vũ Văn Cẩn, the Minister of Health.
- Lê Quang Hòa, the Deputy Minister of Defense.

== Economy ==
Mỹ Hào town is a rice cultivation area due to sunken terrain conditions. However, it is particularly known in Vietnam for its traditional crafts.

Phố Bần has a tradition of processing bean sauce (tương Bần; 貧醬) since the 19th century. The spice has been registered as Mỹ Hào district's exclusive trademark since the 1990s.

== See also ==
- Hưng Yên city
- Khoái Châu district
- Yên Mỹ district
- Văn Lâm district
- Ân Thi district
