= Ân Thi district =

Ân Thi district Huyện Ân Thi Thiên Thi huyện
- Rural District
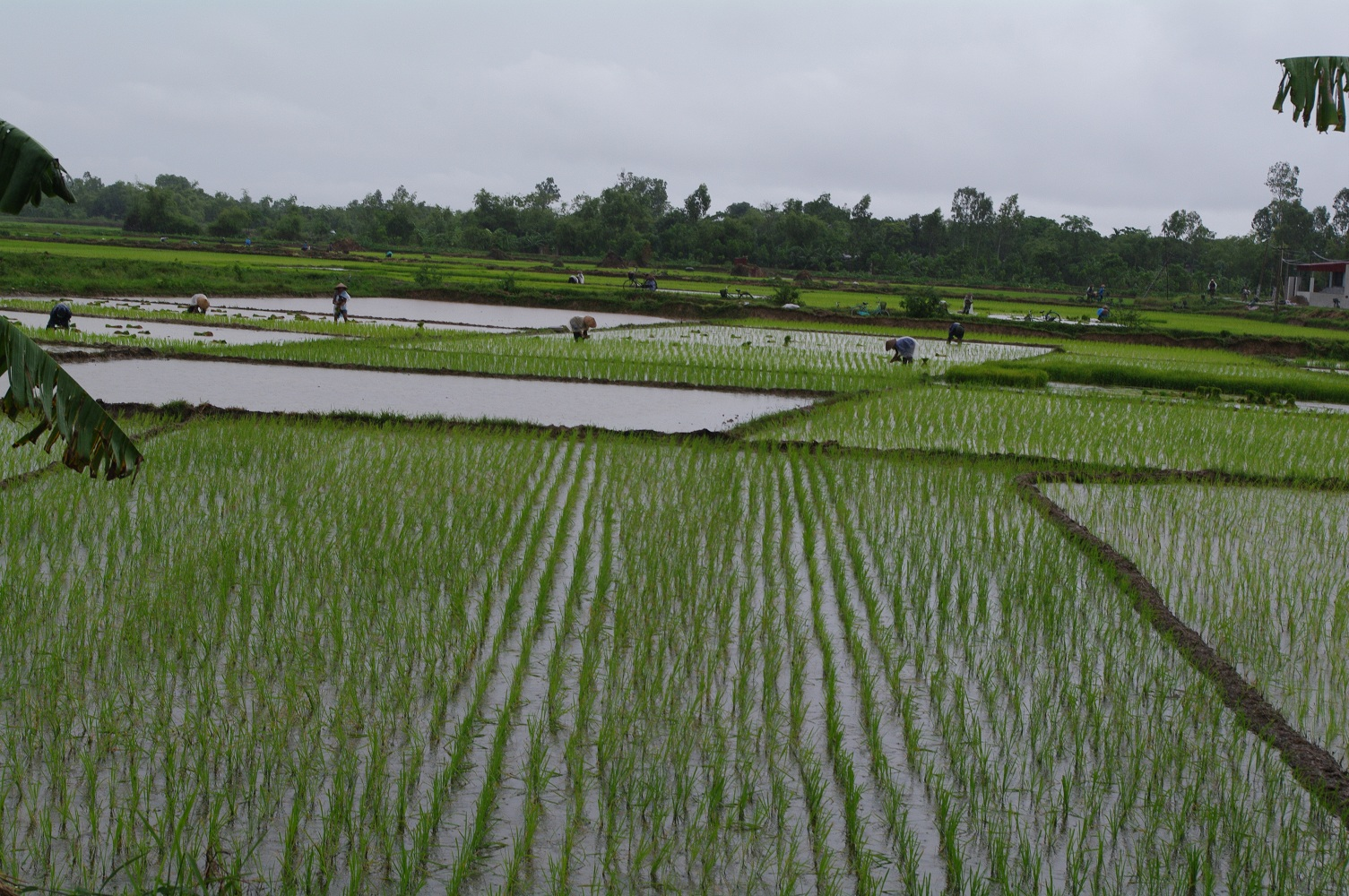
- The paddy field of Ân Thi.
- Nickname: "The Gift of Heaven" (Lộc giời)
- Interactive map of Ân Thi district
- Coordinates: 20°49′06″N 106°05′19″E
- Country: Vietnam
- Region: Red River Delta
- Province: Hưng Yên
- Existence: April 1297 to August 30, 2025
- Central hall: 3/2 lane, Hoàng Văn Thụ road, Ân Thi township

Government
  - Type: Rural district
  - People Committee's Chairman: Dương Tuấn Kiệt
  - People Council's chairman: Lưu Trọng Tuấn
  - Front Committee's chairman: Nguyễn Thị Nga
  - Party Committee's Secretary: Phạm Trường Tam

Area
  - Rural District: 129.98 km^{2} (50.19 sq mi)

Population (2021)
  - Rural District: 135,075
  - Density: 1,039/km^{2} (2,690/sq mi)
  - Urban: 9,564
  - Metro: 125,511
  - Ethnicities: Kinh; Tanka
- Time zone: UTC+07:00
- ZIP code: 174
- Website: Anthi.Hungyen.gov.vn; Anthi.Hungyen.dcs.vn

Ân Thi [ən˧˧:tʰi˧˧] is a former rural district of Hưng Yên province in the Red River Delta region of Vietnam.

== History ==
=== Middle Ages ===
According to An Nam chí lược by official Lê Tắc, in April 1297, the Trần Dynasty established an administrative unit called Thiên Thi rural district (Thiên Thi huyện; 天施縣) in the area of Khoái canton (Khoái lộ) in Thiên Trường prefecture and garrison (Thiên trường phủ lộ). Its name means 'the gift of heaven'.

During the Later Lê Dynasty, Thiên Thi rural district was part of Sơn Nam garrison (Sơn Nam trấn), then Sơn Nam Thượng garrison (Sơn Nam Thượng trấn).

In the 12th year of Minh Mệnh (1831), province regulations were changed to replace garrisons. Therefore, Thiên Thi became part of Hưng Yên province. However, by the 15th year of Tự Đức's reign (1862), the Annamese court said that the word thiên 'heaven' belonged to the sacred category deserving reverence, so all place names containing the word were required to be changed. Examples include : Thiên Bản, Thiên Lộc, Thiên Nguyên, Thiên Quan, Thiên Thi, and Thiên Thụy. Thus, the name of Thiên Thi was changed to Ân Thi rural district (Ân Thi huyện; 恩施縣). Its name means 'the gift of grace'.

In 1885, there was a very serious storm in the whole Hưng Yên province that caused the Red River dike to fail. All districts along the river were flooded, making the terrain almost uninhabitable. From being a large population center for many centuries, the southern territory of Hưng Yên province then became a swamp with insignificant population density. A low-ranking official named Nguyễn Thiện Thuật relied on this factor to urge his relatives as well as the Sơn Nam people to oppose the protecture government. This event is known in history as the Bãi Sậy Uprising (khởi nghĩa Bãi Sậy; 荻林起義; lit. 'the uprising at the Field of Reeds'), whose name originated from the area's typical flora for many years after the flood.

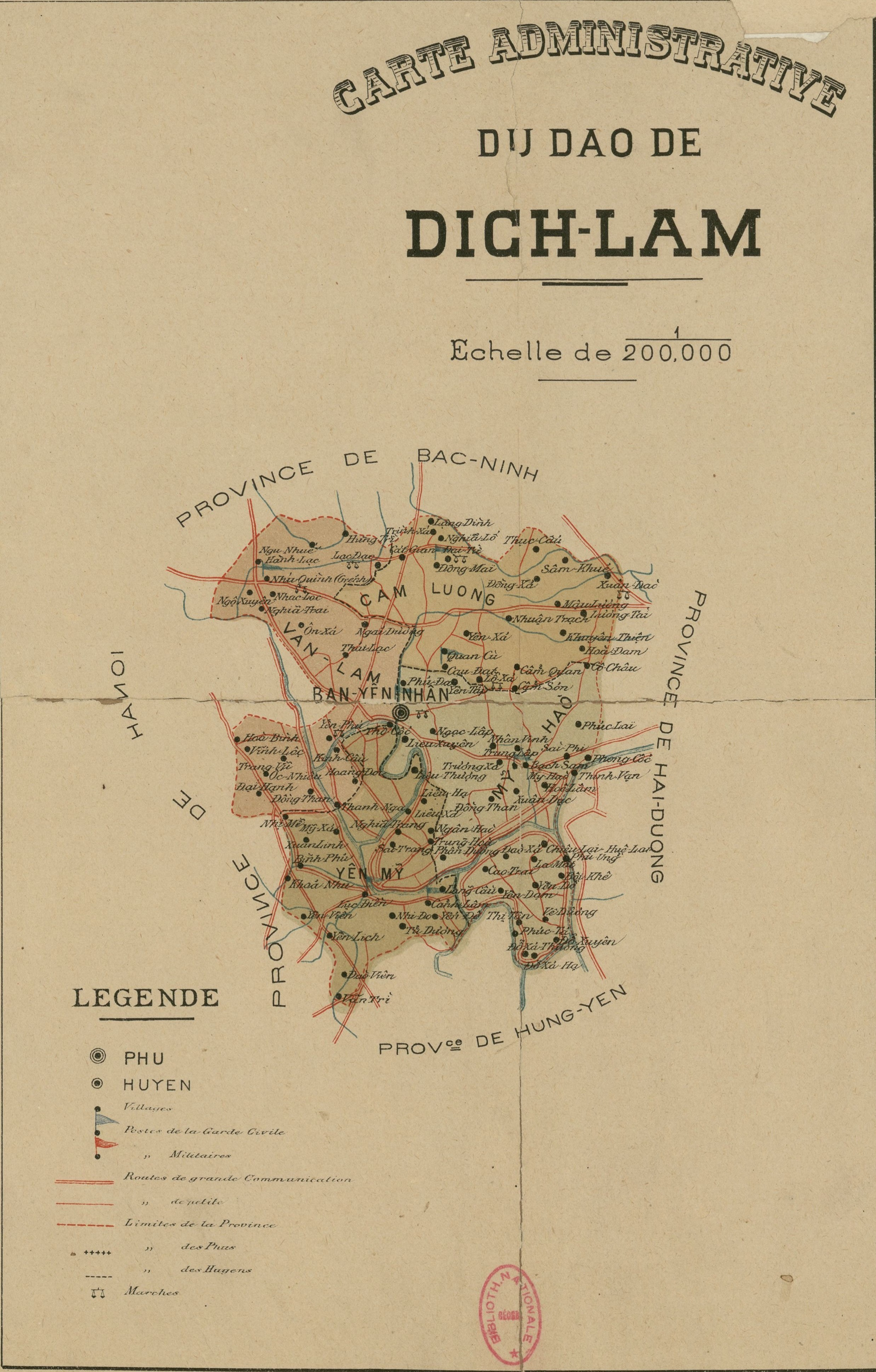
Map of the Địch Lâm garrison.

On February 25, 1890, to deal with the uprising movement in the East of Hanoi, Governor-General Jean-Luc de Saint Peauxpa signed a decision to merge all the Red Riverside rural districts of the three provinces Bắc Ninh, Hưng Yên, and Hải Dương to form a new administrative unit : Địch Lâm garrison (Địch Lâm đạo; 荻林道). Accordingly, this territory was organized according to the regulation as a special military zone, whose head was required to be a French colonel (quan năm vành vàng, 'fifth-level official with golden lines'). Afterwards, some of Ân Thi rural district's flooded communes were merged into Địch Lâm.

Right after the revolt movement was defeated in 1891, the Governor-General restored civil administrative regulations; therefore, the area of Ân Thi was restored as before.

=== 20th century ===
Under the State of Vietnam regime, Ân Thi rural district was renamed Ân Thi district (quận Ân Thi). Until 1955, it was restored to the rural district regulation under the Democratic Republic of Vietnam.

On February 24, 1979, according to Decision 70/CP of the Council of Ministers, Ân Thi, together with Kim Động, were consolidated into Kim Thi rural district (huyện Kim Thi; 金施縣), part to Hải Hưng province.

After 17 years of consolidation, in April 1996, to implement Decree 05/NĐ-CP dated January 27, 1996, by Prime Minister Võ Văn Kiệt, Kim Thi rural district was separated into the two districts of Ân Thi and Kim Động as before.

=== 21st century ===
On October 24, 2024, the National Assembly Standing Committee issued Resolution 1248/NQ-UBTVQH15 on the arrangement of the commune-level administrative unit of Hưng Yên province for the period 2023 to 2025, valid as of December 1, 2024. Accordingly, six communes in Ân Thi rural district were merged to implement the streamlined policy of the apparatus (chính-sách tinh-gọn bộ máy nhà-nước) set out by the Party's General Secretary Tô Lâm.

== Geography ==
=== Topography ===
Ân Thi rural district covers an area of 128 km^{2} (49 sq mi). In particular, most of its terrain is flat, with some locations lower than the sea level; thus, they are easily affected by floods during rainy season.

Currently, Ân Thi is divided into 18 commune-level administrative units.

- 1 township : Ân Thi (capital).
- 17 communes : Bắc Sơn, Bãi Sậy, Cẩm Ninh, Đa Lộc, Đặng Lễ, Đào Dương, Hạ Lễ, Hồ Tùng Mậu, Hoàng Hoa Thám, Hồng Quang, Nguyễn Trãi, Phù Ủng, Quảng Lãng, Quang Vinh, Tiền Phong, Vân Du, Xuân Trúc.

=== Population ===
According to the 2021 statistical yearbook of the whole Hưng Yên province, as of 2020, Ân Thi rural district had a population of 135,075. Additionally, the population of the entire rural district is fully registered as Kinh people.

The area of Ân Thi rural district is known as the shared place of two large Catholic dioceses in Vietnam.

- Thái Bình Cathedral Diocese : There are three parishes in the domain of Ân Thi district, said to have been Christianized in 1616, including Đan Chàng (or Tân Viên, Kẻ Vân), Hạ Lễ and Ngọc Châu. Their patron saint is the Immaculate Heart of Mary.
- Hải Phòng Diocese : There are two parishes, belonging to Kẻ Sặt Deanery, said to have been Christianized in 1655, including Đào Xá and Phần Lâm in Đào Dương commune. Their patron saint is Our Lady of the Immaculate Conception. As of 2026, the priest is Bishop Joan-Baptista Nguyễn Quang Sách, who was ordained on November 5, 2021.

== Culture ==
Ân Thi rural district is said to be one of the cradles of traditional Vietnamese music. Many quan họ folk songs and chèo musical theatre songs have been maintained by folk artists from Ân Thi. In particular, Đào Quạt village is the birthplace of a form called military drum singing (hát trống-quân). According to researcher Trần Văn Khê, it appeared as early as the 19th century.

Until 2024, the rural district had a total of 14 historical and cultural relics recognized at the national level. In addition, 43 relics are recognized and protected at the provincial level.

== Economy ==
Ân Thi is a purely agricultural rural district; therefore, it is continually ranked as one of the most underdeveloped localities in Vietnam. Until 2024, there were only a few traditional craft villages in the area of the rural district, but their total income was generally not high. Currently, the Ân Thi District People's Committee has set a plan to develop the green economy (kinh-tế xanh) from 2025 to 2035.

== See also ==
- Khoái Châu district
- Kim Động district
- Văn Giang district
- Yên Mỹ district
