= Yên Mỹ district =

Yên Mỹ district Huyện Yên Mỹ
- Rural district
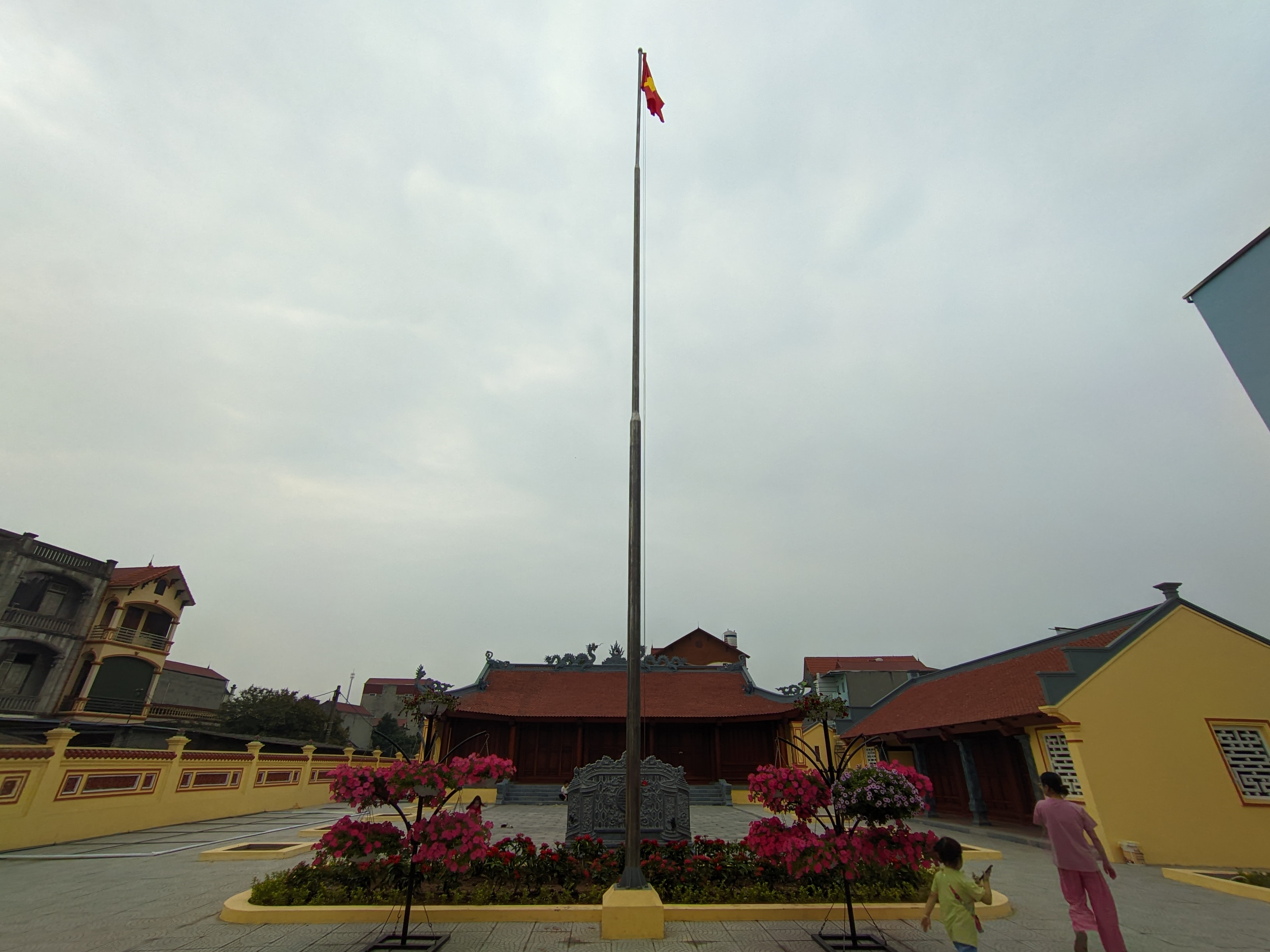
- The memorial house of Poet Đoàn Thị Điểm in Giai Phạm village, Nguyễn Văn Linh commune.

- Location within Vietnam
- Coordinates: 20°52′03″N 106°01′16″E
- Country: Vietnam
- Region: Red River Delta
- Province: Hưng Yên
- Capital: Yên Mỹ township
- Existence: February 25, 1890 to August 30, 2025
- Central hall: National Route 39A, Tân Lập commune

Government
  - Type: Rural district
  - People Committee's Chairman: Đặng Xuân Lương
  - People Council's chairman: Nguyễn Văn Đoan
  - Front Committee's chairman: Nguyễn Huy Chương
  - Party Committee's Secretary: Trần Tùng Chuẩn

Area
  - Rural district: 92.38 km^{2} (35.67 sq mi)

Population (2021)
  - Rural district: 159,146
  - Density: 1,723/km^{2} (4,460/sq mi)
  - Urban: 14,695 (9%)
  - Ethnicities: Kinh
- Time zone: UTC+7 (Indochina Time)
- ZIP code: 177
- Website: yenmy.hungyen.gov.vn

Yên Mỹ is a former rural district of Hưng Yên province in the Red River Delta region of Vietnam.

== History ==
Yên Mỹ was the district-level administrative unit what was established at the latest in the Red River Delta.

According to the surveys of researcher Philippe Papin, at the beginning of Công Nguyên, the Southeastern area of modern Hanoi was still under the sea level, so it was very difficult to settle down.

Since the middle of the belonging to the North, according to the records of the officials from the mainland China, the area of modern Hưng Yên province was almost swampy. Therefore, in the middle of the 10th century, a military leader named Lữ Đường relied on this muddy terrain to rule as a feud. The area was slenderly called as Tế Giang (細江, "the tiny stream") by the folks. It was only a small flow, which connected the Hồng River with Thương and Cầu River.

In 995 the Early Lê Dynasty changed it to Cổ Pháp canton (古法州, "Cổ Pháp châu"). However, by 1009, right after winning the golden throne, Emperor Thuận Thiên ordered to change it to Thiên Đức prefecture (天德府, "Thiên Đức phủ"). It was not until that time that there was an official administrative unit called Tế Giang district (細江縣, "Tế Giang huyện").

When the Lý Dynasty moved the capital to Thăng Long citadel, Tế Giang was part of Gia Lâm district (嘉林縣, "Gia Lâm huyện"), what still belonged to Thiên Đức. Coming to the Trần Dynasty, it belonged to Bắc Giang garrison (北江路, "Bắc Giang lộ"). The reason for this name was because of the dangerous nature of the area. The capital of this locality was located in Vạn Kiếp, where there was a regulation like a military barracks to prevent the entire North and East of Thăng Long.

When the Ming Dynasty ruled Annam at the beginning of 15th century, Tế Giang was part of Gia Lâm canton (嘉林州, "Gia Lâm châu"), Bắc Giang prefecture (北江府, "Bắc Giang phủ").

In the 10th year of Quang Thuận of the Later Lê Dynasty, Tế Giang was changed to Văn Giang district (文江縣, "Văn Giang huyện"), belonging to Thuận An prefecture (順安府, "Thuận An phủ"), Kinh Bắc garrison (京北承宣, "Kinh Bắc thừa tuyên"). This domain continued to be strengthened to protect the East of the capital.

About 1832 Emperor Minh Mệnh changed Kinh Bắc to Bắc Ninh province. By 1862, Thuận An was changed to Thuận Thành. Thus, Văn Giang belonged to Thuận Thành prefecture (順城府, "Thuận Thành phủ"), Bắc Ninh province (北寧省, "Bắc Ninh tỉnh").

But in the whole Hưng Yên province about 1885, there was a very serious storm that caused the Red River dike to be broken. Flood waters have flooded all districts along the river, making the terrain almost unable to live. From a large population for many centuries, the Southern domain of Hưng Yên province became a swamp with insignificant population density. A low-ranking official named Nguyễn Thiện Thuật relied on this factor to urge his relatives as well as the Sơn Nam people to build a basis to oppose the protect government. This event was still known in history as the Bãi Sậy Uprising (荻林起義, khởi nghĩa Bãi Sậy, "the uprising at the mop bund"), which originated from the typical flora of the domain for many years after the flood.

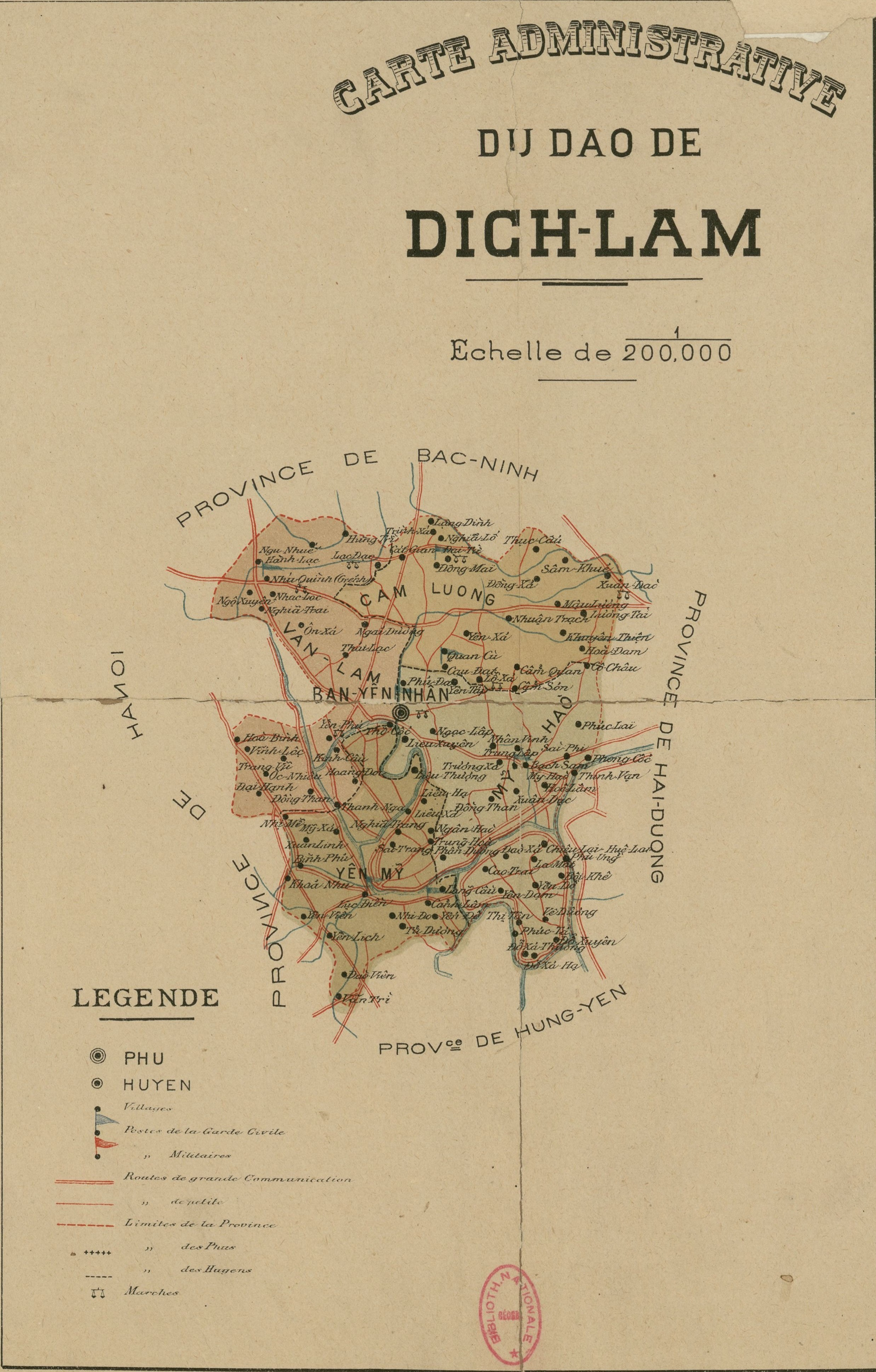
Map of Địch Lâm garrison.

On February 25, 1890, to deal with the uprising movement in the East of Hanoi, Governor-General Jean-Luc de Saint Peauxpa has signed a decision to merge all the Red Riverside districts of three provinces Bắc Ninh, Hưng Yên, Hải Dương to form a new administrative unit : Địch Lâm garrison (荻林道, "Địch Lâm đạo"). Accordingly, this domain was organized according to the regulation like a special-military zone, which the head must be a French colonel (quan năm vành vàng, "fifth-level official with golden lines"). Therefore, Địch Lâm garrison consisted of 4 rural districts : Cẩm Lương, Mỹ Hào, Văn Lâm and Yên Mỹ. Accordingly, the area of Yên Mỹ district (安美縣, Yên Mỹ huyện) has been formed from :

- Hưng Yên province with some parts of two rural districts Đông Yên and Ân Thi.
- Hải Dương province with some parts of Mỹ Hào rural district.
- Bắc Ninh province with some parts of Văn Giang rural district.

Its name has been assembled from "Hưng Yên" and "Mỹ Hào". However, right after the revolt movement was defeated in 1891, the Governor-General restored civil administrative regulations, but the two rural districts of Yên Mỹ and Mỹ Hào still exist.

=== 20th century ===
Under the French provisional military government in Tonkin about early 1947, the "phủ" regulation was officially abolished. Yên Mỹ rural district has been changed to Yên Mỹ district (安美郡, quận Yên Mỹ) and it has become one of nine districts of Hưng Yên province. Until the Government of the Democratic Republic of Vietnam was re-established in the North Vietnam (1955), the "huyện" regulation was restored.

On March 11, 1977, districts Yên Mỹ (South) and Văn Giang (North) have been re-merged to become Văn Yên district (文安縣, huyện Văn Yên).

On February 24, 1979, Văn Yên was dissolved. 5 Yên Mỹ communes and 9 Văn Giang communes were merged into Khoái Châu to become Châu Giang district (州江縣, huyện Châu Giang). The remaining Văn Yên communes have been merged with Văn Mỹ communes to become Mỹ Văn district (美文縣, huyện Mỹ Văn).

In 1994, according to Decree 56-CP of the Government of Vietnam, Trai Trang commune of Mỹ Văn rural district was upgraded to Yên Mỹ township (安美市鎮, thị trấn Yên Mỹ).

On July 24, 1999, the Government of Vietnam continued to issue Decree 60/1999/NĐ-CP on the division of Mỹ Văn rural district into three districts Mỹ Hào, Văn Lâm and Yên Mỹ. Simultaneously, there was an adjustment of the boundaries of five communes Minh Châu, Việt Cường, Yên Phú, Yên Hòa and Hoàn Long from former Châu Giang rural district for returning to Yên Mỹ rural district's management.

=== 21st century ===
On October 24, 2024, the National Assembly Standing Committee of Vietnam issued Resolution 1248/NQ-UBTVQH15 on the arrangement of the commune-level administrative unit of Hưng Yên province in the period of 2023–2025, what has been valid from December 1, 2024. Accordingly, 8 communes and Yên Mỹ township in Yên Mỹ rural district were merged each other to implement the streamlined policy of the apparatus (chính-sách tinh-gọn bộ máy nhà-nước) that Party's General Secretary Tô Lâm set out.

- Two communes Nghĩa Hiệp và Giai Phạm were merged into Nguyễn Văn Linh commune.
- Two communes Lý Thường Kiệt và Tân Việt were merged into Tân Minh commune.
- Three communes Yên Hòa, Minh Châu và Việt Cường were merged into Việt Yên commune.
- Trung Hưng commune was merged to Yên Mỹ township.

== Geography ==
=== Topography ===
Currently, Yên Mỹ rural district is subdivided into 18 commune-level administrative units, including 1 township: Yên Mỹ (capital) and 11 communes: Đồng Than, Liêu Xá, Hoàn Long, Ngọc Long, Nguyễn Văn Linh, Tân Lập, Tân Minh, Thanh Long, Trung Hòa, Việt Yên, Yên Phú. Yên Mỹ covers an area of 92.38 km^{2}. According to monitoring data since the French protecture, the terrain of the rural district tends to be low from the Northwest to the Southeast. Until 2024, the whole district still has about 3/4 of its area is lower than sea level. This is caused by the interlaced natural canal system and even landslides due to floods.

The district is also known to be in the intersection of many most important routes in Vietnam. Therefore, it has been called the "blood vessels" (huyết-mạch) by Vietnamese press from the Vietnam War. Specifically : National routes of 5A and 39, Hanoi–Haiphong Highway (or National Route 5B), Chợ Bến – Yên Mỹ Highway, Hà Nội – Hưng Yên Inter-provincial Road. Not yet counting other traffic road projects, which are still in the construction price.

=== Population ===
According to the 2021 statistical yearbook]of the whole Hưng Yên province, as of 2020 Yên Mỹ had a population of 159,146 with a density of 1,723/km^{2}. Besides, the population of the whole rural district is fully registered as Kinh people.

== Culture ==
=== Customs ===
Ever since it was still belonged to Văn Giang district, Yên Mỹ has formed early a rich culture, which was resonated from three large flow : North (Kinh Bắc), East (Hải Đông), South (Sơn Nam Thượng).

Since the Later Lê Dynasty, Yên Mỹ's area has been among the few local priorities to recruit the harem (hậu cung) for the royal family. Those who are considered to join positions such as: Concubinage, eunuch, servant. This stimulated the formation of power and wealth clans (quý tộc, "aristocracy") for many centuries. Until around the 17th century, tutors and healers were recruited to serve Trịnh viceroys also always from Yên Mỹ.

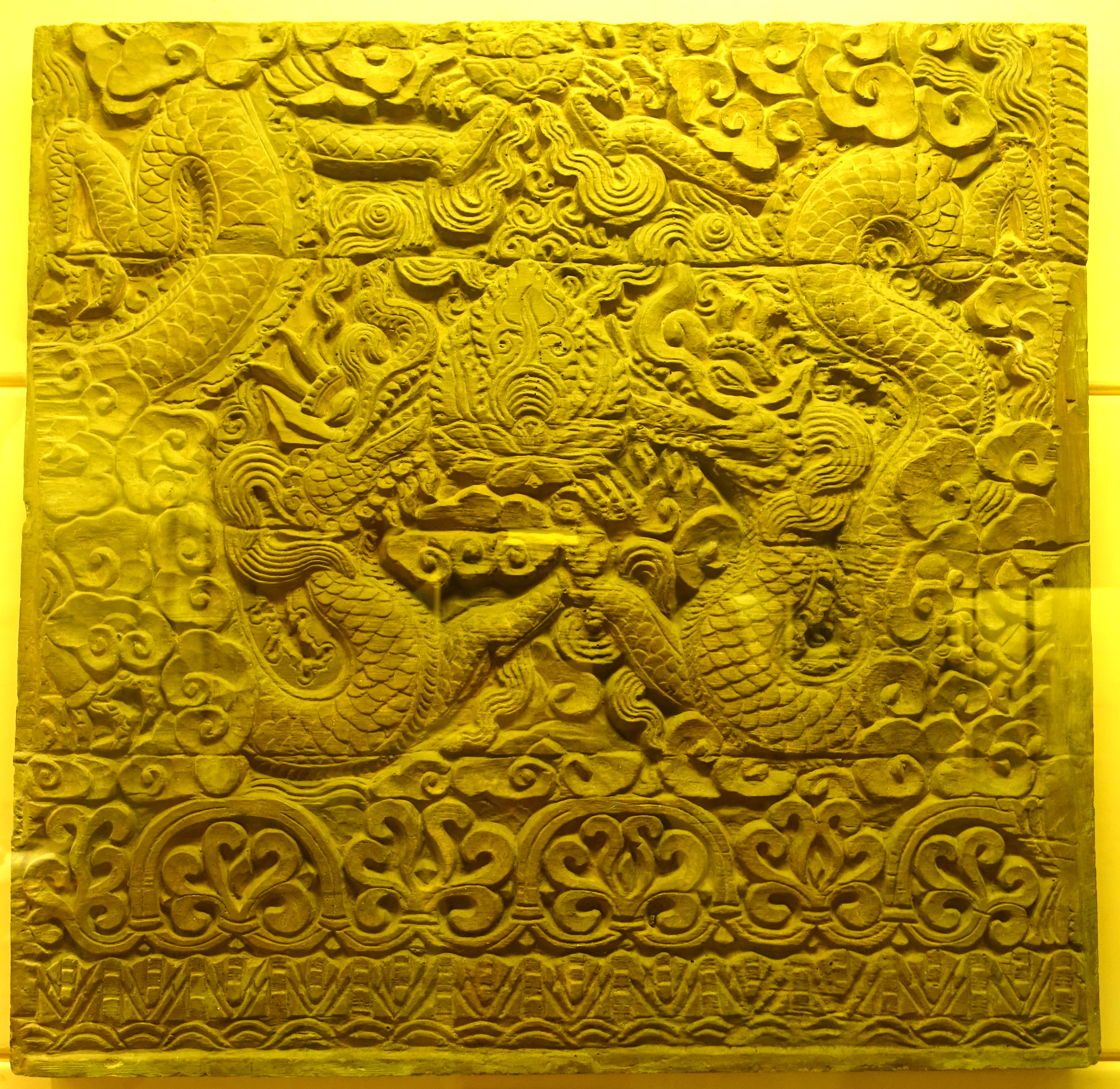
Dragon relief around the 14-15 century, Thái Lác pagoda, Lạc Hồng commune.

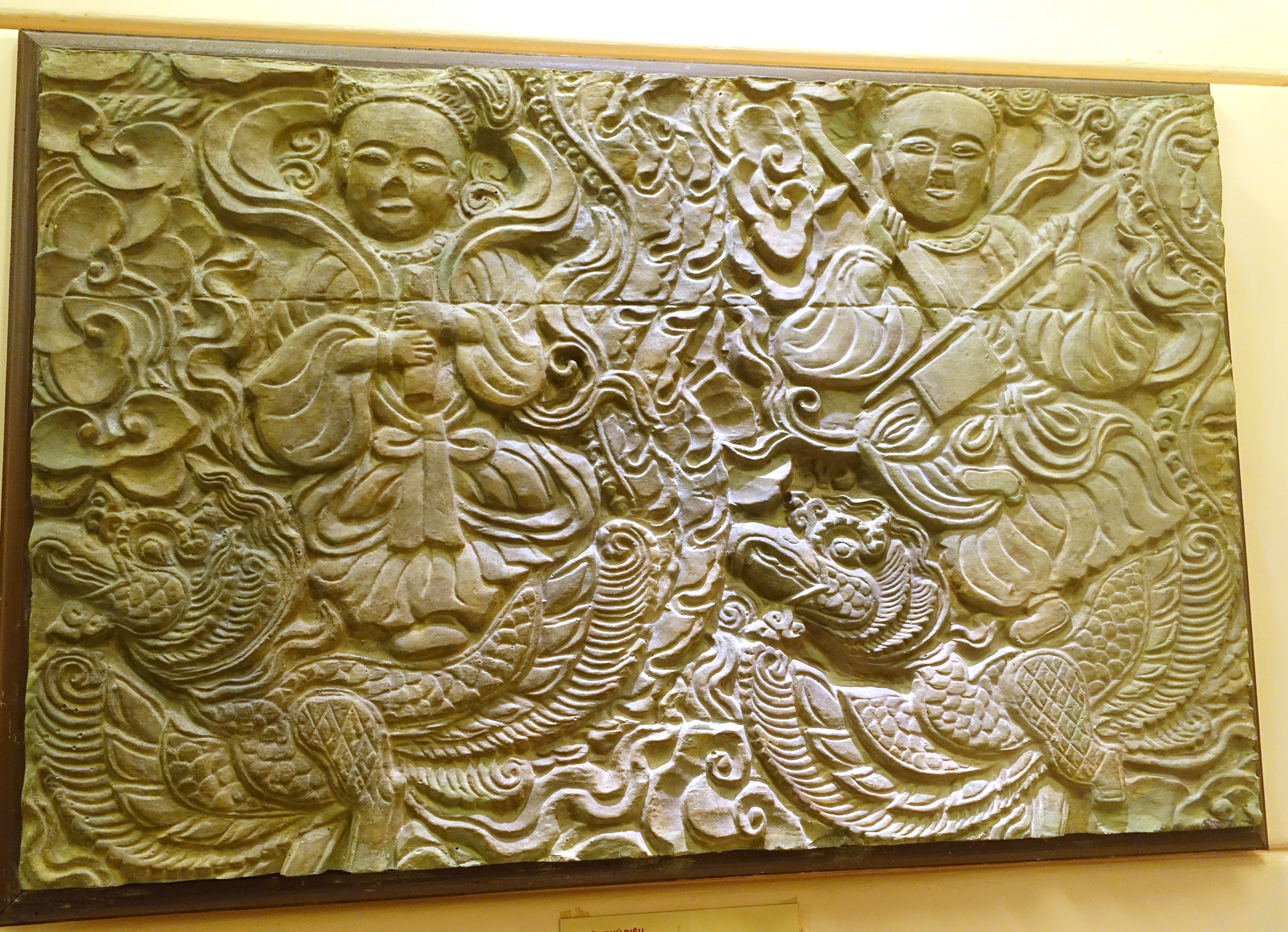
Fairy and garuda reliefs around the 14-15 century, Thái Lác pagoda, Lạc Hồng commune.

=== Tourism ===
Until 2025 there were more than 100 relics, which had historical and cultural significance to Yên Mỹ rural district, ranked from the central to the grassroots level to have conservation regulations.

Besides, the whole district has a total of 98 festivals that have been admitted to legality so that it is easy to develop the heritage tourism industry (du-lịch di-sản).

=== Notable persons ===
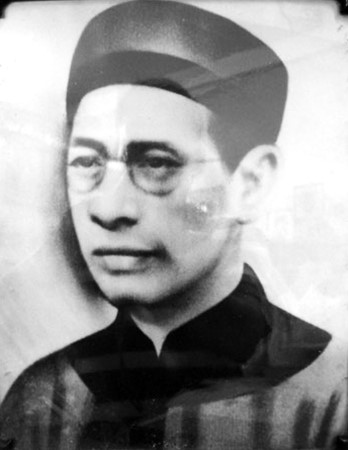
Annamese official Ngô Gia Lễ.

- Phạm Công Trứ : Prime Minister of the Revival Lê Dynasty.
- Lê Hữu Trác: Physician.
- Đoàn Thị Điểm : Poet.
- Vũ Trọng Phụng : Journalist and writer.
- Nguyễn Văn Linh : General Secretary of the Communist Party of Vietnam.
- Nguyễn Bình : A military general.

== Economy ==
The area of Yên Mỹ rural district has many national highways running, thus from the beginning, it has been included in the map of the Northern Key Economic Zone (Vùng Kinh-tế Trọng-điểm Bắc-Bộ) : Hà Nội – Hưng Yên – Hải Dương – Hải Phòng – Quảng Ninh.

Its economic structure until 2018 is as follows : Industry and construction 83.25%; trade and service 13.54%, agriculture 3.22%.

=== Industry ===
According to statistical documents of the Yên Mỹ District People's Committee of from 2018 to 2023, with the advantage of being a very developed location (chân kiềng) between the two economic zones of Hanoi and Haiphong, right from the early 20th century, Yên Mỹ rural district has owned the most abundant industrial capacity of Hưng Yên province.

In 1999 the entire district had only one industrial project with a very low total budget. But until 2018, it was classified as the three rural districts with the highest investment attraction of the province. National and regional industrial parks appeared consecutively, such as : Phố Nối A&B Textile Industrial Zone, Thăng Long II Industrial Zone, Yên Mỹ I&II Industrial Zone... That has led to the formation of industrial clusters : Yên Mỹ township, Nguyễn Văn Linh, Tân Lập and Liêu Xá communes.

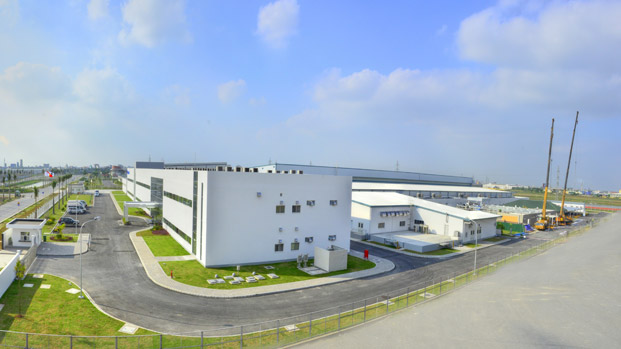
Vietnam Hungyen Panasonic Appliances Co.Ltd. at the Thăng Long II.

=== Agriculture ===
Wet rice growing is a characteristic and also the advantage of the district agriculture. From 2000 to 2018, the growth rate of production has always reached nearly 1.25% in all years.

Currently Yên Mỹ rural district is still in the process of accumulating experience to deploy more vegetable production systems (hoa-màu sạch) and breeding systems (thịt sạch) to change the economic structure.

In the harshest period of COVID-19 pandemic, Yên Mỹ was very prominent in the media because it was the largest safe vegetable (hoa-màu an-toàn) supplier nationwide. But after the pandemic passed, the District People's Committee began to discuss brand registration for their agricultural products called as "Hoa-Màu Yên-Mỹ" (Yên Mỹ Vegetable).

== See also ==
- Ân Thi district
- Khoái Châu district
- Phù Cừ district
- Văn Giang district
