= Hải Thượng Lãn Ông =

Vietnamese physician

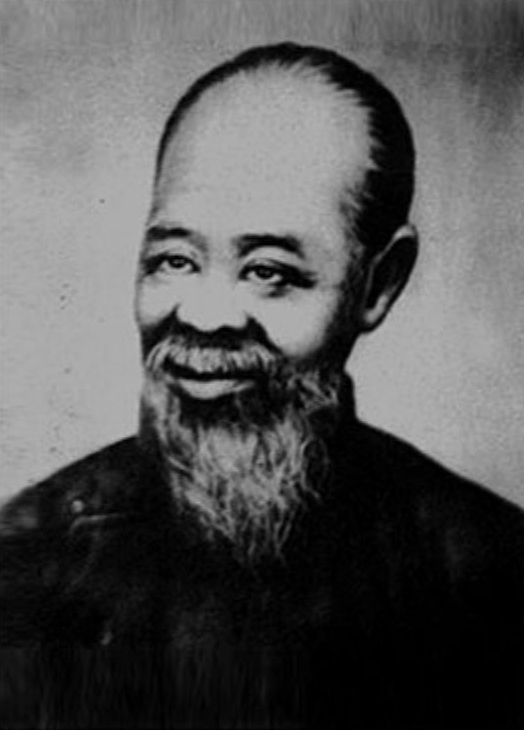
- Vietnamese alphabet: Lê Hữu Trác
- Chữ Hán: 黎有晫

Lê Hữu Trác (Chữ Hán: 黎有晫, 1724 in Hưng Yên – 1791 in Hà Tĩnh) or alias Hải Thượng Lãn Ông (海上懶翁), was an 18th-century Vietnamese physician who was the best known and most celebrated doctor in Vietnamese history. Hữu Trác was conscripted into the army in 1740 at the age of sixteen. In 1746 he withdrew from the army after his eldest brother died and lived in Hương Sơn District with his elderly mother. His own son died in a smallpox epidemic in 1758 when he was five years old. He then spent the next fifteen years learning medicine, with a particular focus on curing smallpox. He traveled to Đông Kinh in 1782, by order of lord Trịnh Sâm, to treat the Crown Prince.

== Personal background ==
Lê Hữu Trác, originally called Huân (薰), was born on November 11, 1720, in the village of Văn Xá, Liêu Xá region, Đường Hào district, Thượng Hồng Phủ, Hải Dương province (the current Liêu Xã commune, Yên Mỹ district, Hưng Yên province). He was the seventh son of the family.

== Works ==
- Practice of the Lazy Master of Hai Thuong (Hải Thượng y tông tâm lĩnh)
- Confused Attempts at Diagnosing Smallpox (Mộng trung giác đậu)
- Thượng kinh ký sự
