= Mỹ Hào =

- Ward
- Bần Yên Nhân soy sauce craft village
- Interactive map of Mỹ Hào
- Coordinates: 20°55′52″N 106°6′3″E
- Country: Vietnam
- Region: Red River Delta
- Province: Hưng Yên province
- Established: 16 June 2025
- Administrative headquarters: 23 Nguyễn Thiện Thuật Street

Area
  - Total: 28.36 km^{2} (10.95 sq mi)

Population (2024)
  - Total: 57,676
  - Density: 2,033/km^{2} (5,270/sq mi)
- Website: myhao.hungyen.gov.vn

Mỹ Hào is a ward in Hưng Yên province, Vietnam. It is one of six wards in the northern part of the province following the 2025 Vietnamese administrative reform.

On 16 June 2025, the National Assembly of Vietnam adopted Resolution No. 203/2025/QH15 amending and supplementing several articles of the Constitution of the Socialist Republic of Vietnam, effective on the same date. Under the resolution, district-level administrative units nationwide ceased to operate from 1 July 2025.

The Standing Committee of the National Assembly of Vietnam issued Resolution No. 1666/NQ-UBTVQH15 on the arrangement of commune-level administrative units in Hưng Yên province in 2025, effective from 16 June 2025. Under the resolution, the entire area and population of Bần Yên Nhân, Nhân Hòa, and Phan Đình Phùng wards, formerly part of Mỹ Hào town, together with Cẩm Xá commune, also formerly part of Mỹ Hào town, were merged to form a new ward named Mỹ Hào.
