= Khoái Châu district =

Khoái Châu district Huyện Khoái Châu
- Rural district
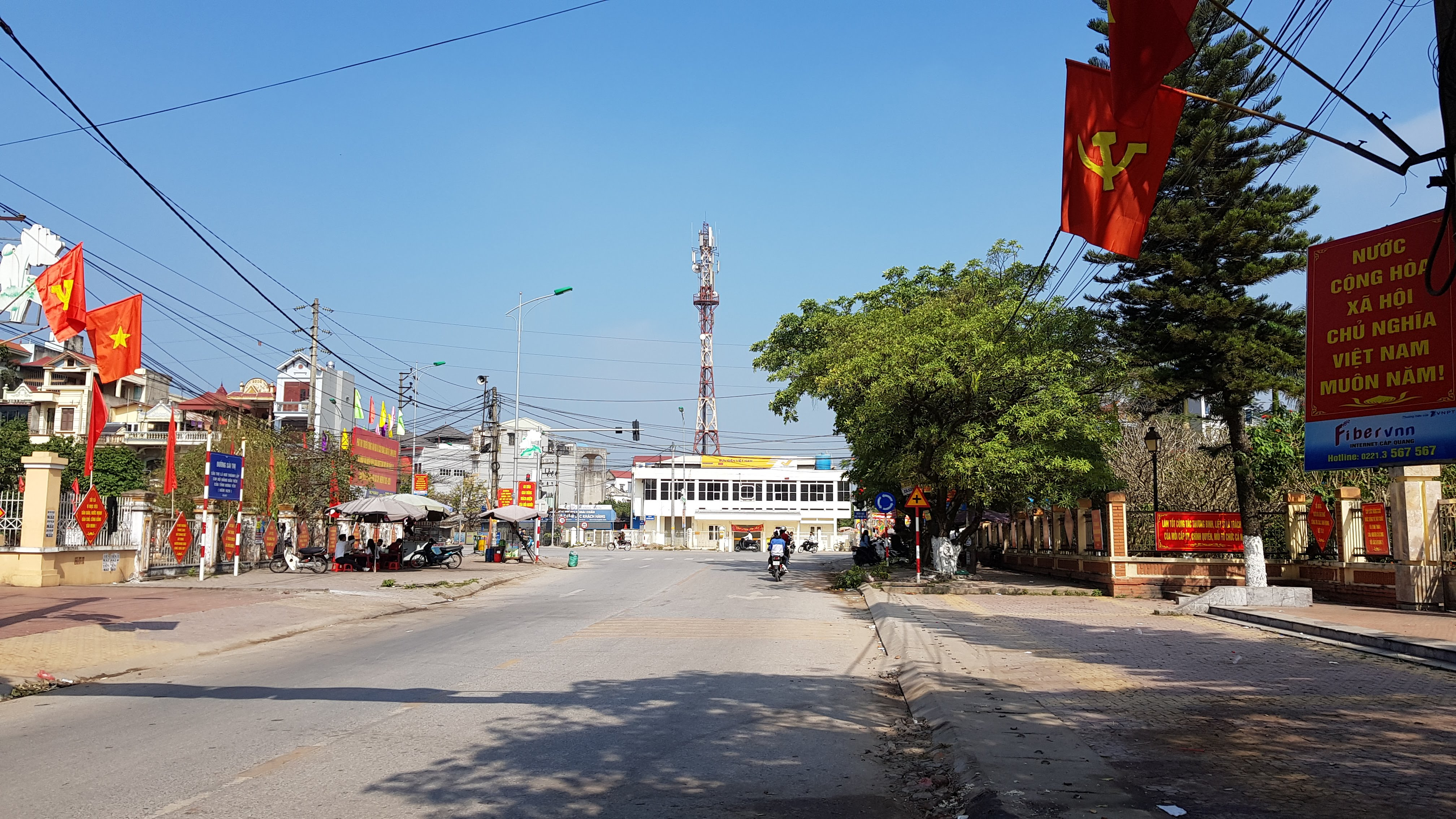
- Sài Thị road in the centre of Khoái Châu township.
- Nickname: "The Waiting Wharf" (Bến đợi)
- Interactive map of Khoái Châu district
- Coordinates: 20°52′16″N 105°58′59″E
- Country: Vietnam
- Region: Red River Delta
- Province: Hưng Yên
- Existence: 3rd century to August 30, 2025
- Central hall: RXRG+3PM, Provincial Route 206, Phủ street, Khoái Châu township

Government
  - Type: Rural district
  - People Committee's Chairman: Phạm Xuân Thắng
  - People Council's Chairman: Hoàng Văn Tựu
  - Front Committee's Chairman: Phạm Quý Dương
  - Party Committee's Secretary: Bùi Huy Cường

Area
  - Rural district: 130.82 km^{2} (50.51 sq mi)

Population (2020)
  - Rural district: 189,070
  - Density: 1,445/km^{2} (3,740/sq mi)
  - Urban: 8,322
  - Metro: 180,748
  - Ethnicities: Kinh; Tanka
- Time zone: UTC+7 (Indochina Time)
- ZIP code: 178 (Note: An official code from December 31, 2022, to present.)
- Website: Khoaichau.Hungyen.gov.vn; Khoaichau.Hungyen.dcs.vn

Khoái Châu [xwaːj˧˥:ʨəw˧˧] is a former rural district of Hưng Yên province in the Red River Delta of Vietnam.

== History ==
=== Middle Ages ===
According to researcher Philippe Papin, the Red River Delta at the beginning of Công Nguyên was still a closed bay and the human could not be settled. (Note: Philippe Papin, Histoire de Hanoï, Fayard, Paris, 2001.) (Note: Pierre Asselin, Pierre Brocheux, Christopher E. Goscha, Pierre Grosser, Annick Guénel, François Guillemot, Andrew Hardy, Michel Hoàng, Pierre Journoud, Anne Marie Moulin, Philippe Papin, Emmanuel Poisson, Dominique Rolland, Hugues Tertrais, Benoît de Tréglodé..., Le Viêt-Nam depuis 2000 ans, De La Republique Eds, Paris, 2017.) It was not until the period of Đông Ngô state, a small administrative unit called Khoái-châu (快州, "Khoái canton") that actually appeared in documents. According to the presentations of scholars Trần Trí Dõi, Lê Chí Quế and Lê Văn Lan, this name was actually just a Hanese glottography to old name Keluar (means "estuar") in the Malayo-Polynesian languages which was popular in the ancient Indochina peninsula. It indicated the locality of the left bank of the Red River.

As soon as Prince Ngô Quyền took his autonomy in the Red River Delta, its name was changed to Đằng-châu (滕州, "Đằng canton"). This new way of calling to refer to the fast flowing water of the Red River.

During the Đinh dynasty, Đằng Châu became the capital of Đằng-đạo (滕道, "Đằng garrison"), which corresponded to most of the modern Hưng Yên province. In 1005, the Early Lê dynasty changed Đằng Đạo to Thái-bình phủ (太平府, "Thái Bình prefecture"). Until 1222, the Lý dynasty restored Thái Bình Phủ to Khoái-lộ (快路, "Khoái garrison"). Howeved, in April 1297, the Trần dynasty merged Khoái Lộ in Thiên-trường phủ-lộ (天長府路, "Thiên Trường prefecture and garrison").

In June 1407, the Minh dynasty divided Thiên Trường Phủ Lộ into several new administrative units. Khoái Châu has become a part of Kiến-xương phủ (健昌府, "Kiến Xương prefecture"). It means "building the prosperity". However, in 1426, King Lê Lợi personally abolished to set up a temporary administrative unit called Nam-đạo (南道, "South garrison"). But until June 1466, Emperor Quang Thuận re-established Thiên-trường thừa-tuyên (天長承宣, "Thiên Trường garrison"). By 1490, Emperor Hồng Đức re-changed Thiên Trường Thừa Tuyên to Sơn-nam xứ (山南處, "Sơn Nam domain").

In June 1527, Emperor Minh Đức merged Sơn Nam Xứ into Dương-kinh (陽京), the vice capital of Mạc dynasty's An Nam. Although a few decades later, the Revival Lê dynasty changed it for returning to the old name. In January 1741, under the reign of Emperor Cảnh Hưng, name Khoái-châu phủ (快州府, "Khoái Châu prefecture") had appeared at the first time, but it was a bad type of pun in the eyes of contemporary scholar]. (Note: Đan Sơn (1735 – ?), Sơn-cư tạp-chí (山居雜誌), Đông Kinh, Bắc Hà, An Nam, 1786–9.)

In October 1831, Emperor Minh Mệnh conducted a fierce administrative reform. Accordingly, the entire vast Sơn Nam area was removed. Since then, Khoái Châu Phủ is part of Hưng-yên tỉnh (興安省, "Hưng Yên province").

=== 20th century ===
In 1945, the government of the Empire of Vietnam abolished the "phủ" regime. Therefore, all of "phủ" (prefectures) were changed to "huyện" (rural districts). Thus, huyện Khoái-châu (快州縣, "Khoái Châu rural district") has been officially formed. However, during the period of the State of Vietnam, Huyện Khoái Châu was changed to quận Khoái-châu (快州郡, "Khoái Châu district").

On February 24, 1979, the Council of Ministers of Vietnam issued Decision 70-CP on the merger of 14 communes of Văn Yên district to Khoái Châu district to establish Châu Giang rural district (州江縣, huyện Châu-giang).

On July 24, 1999, the Government of Vietnam issued Decree 60/1999/NĐ-CP on the division of Châu Giang district into two new districts of Khoái Châu and Văn Giang.

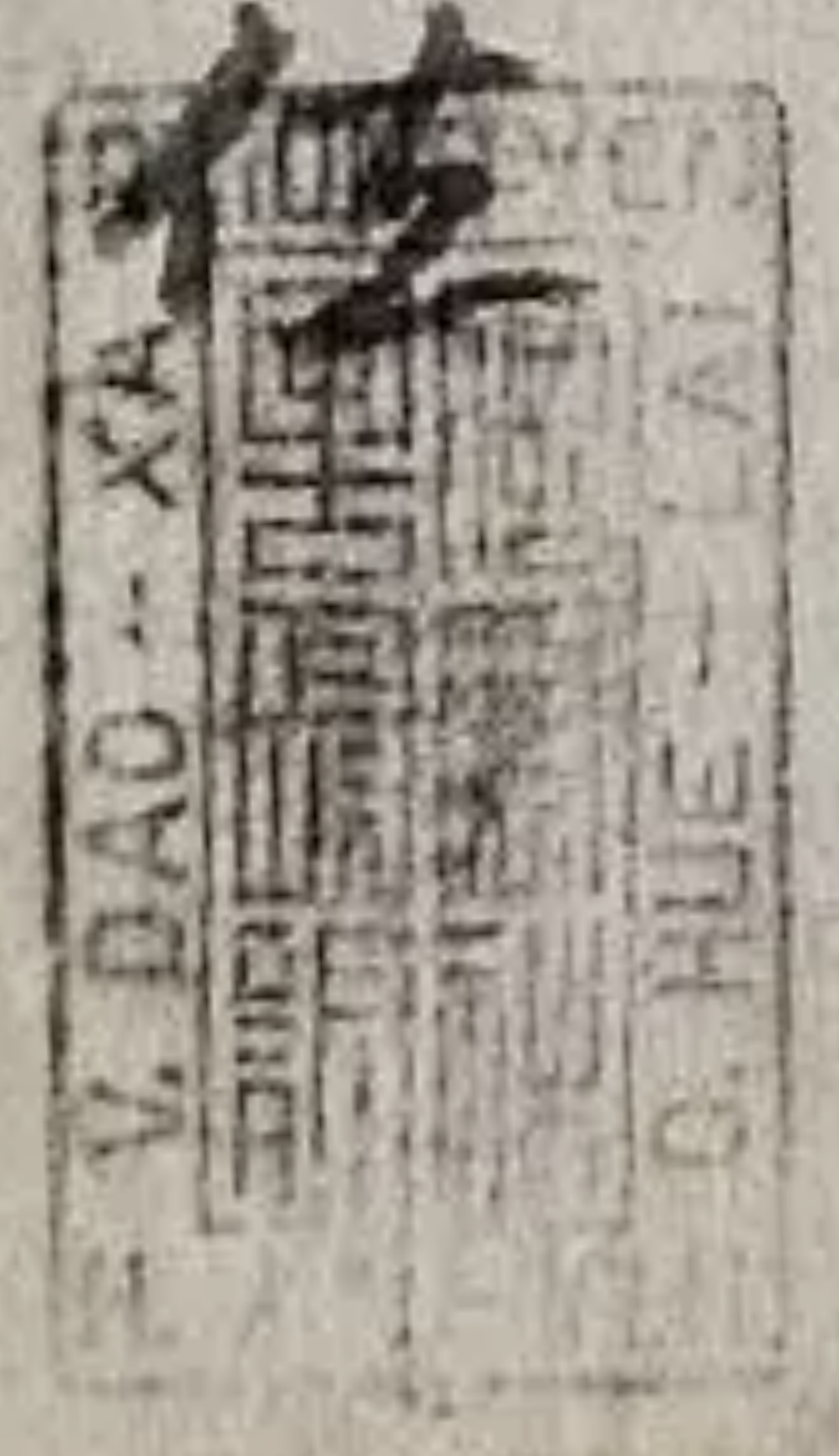

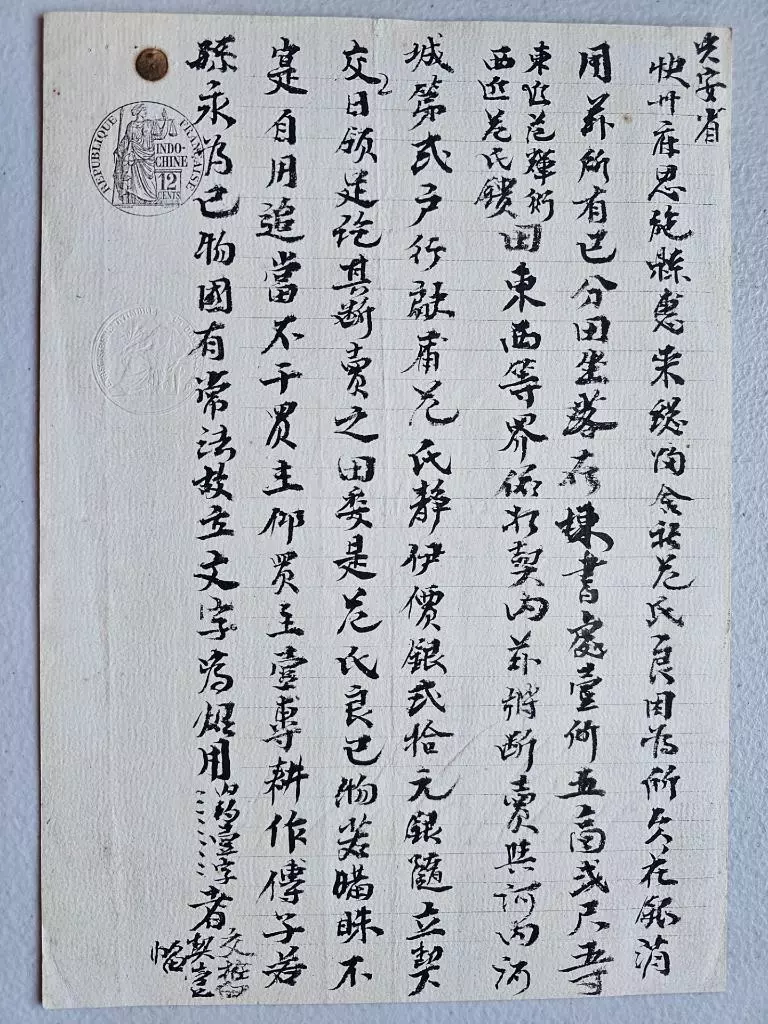

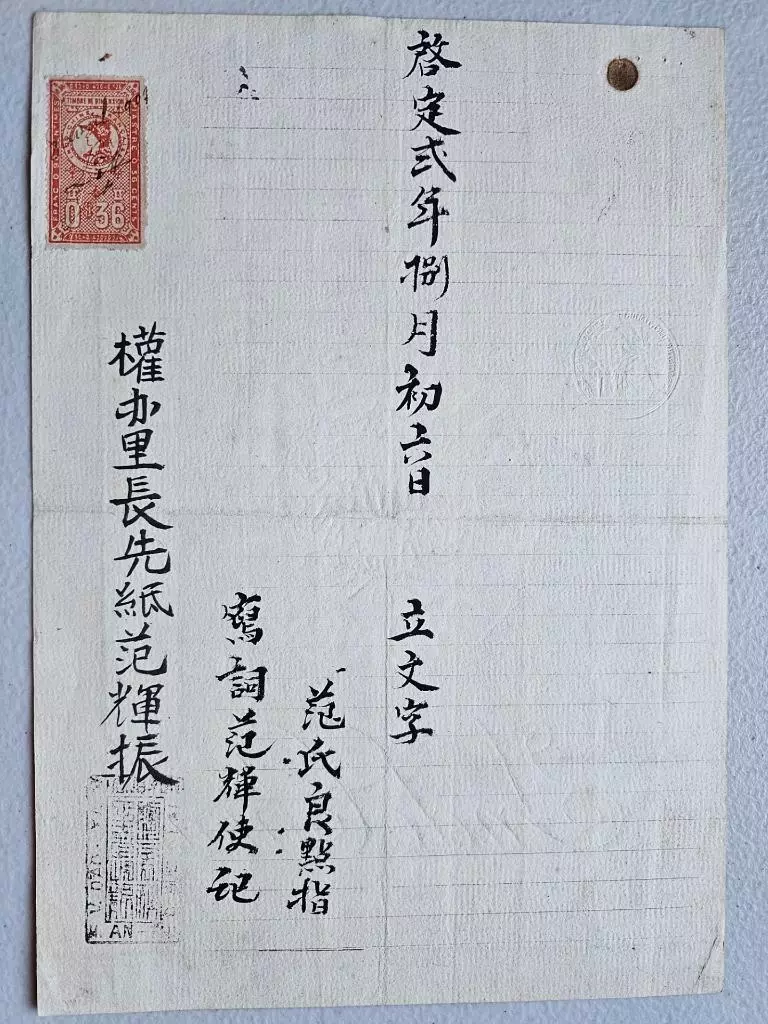

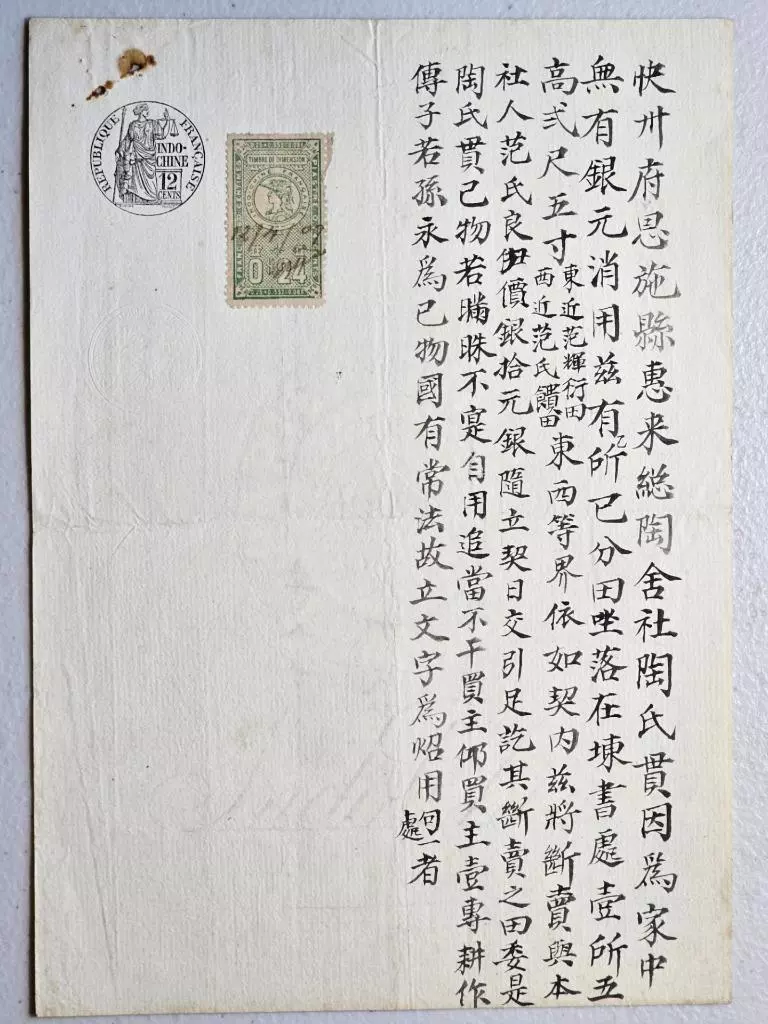

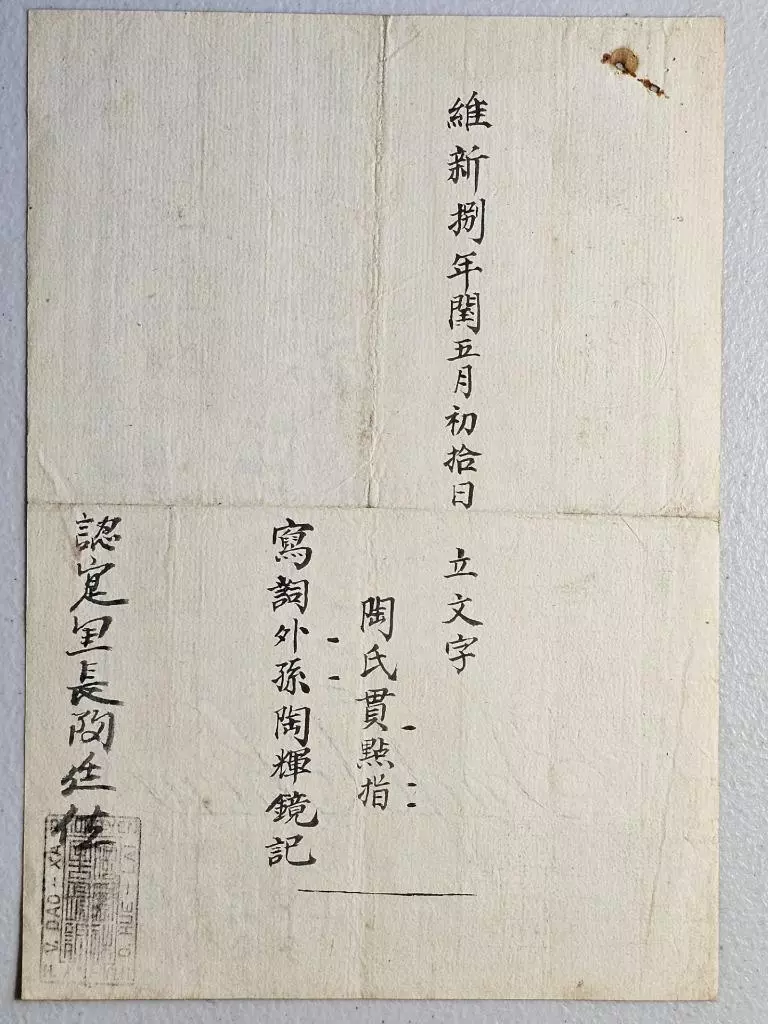

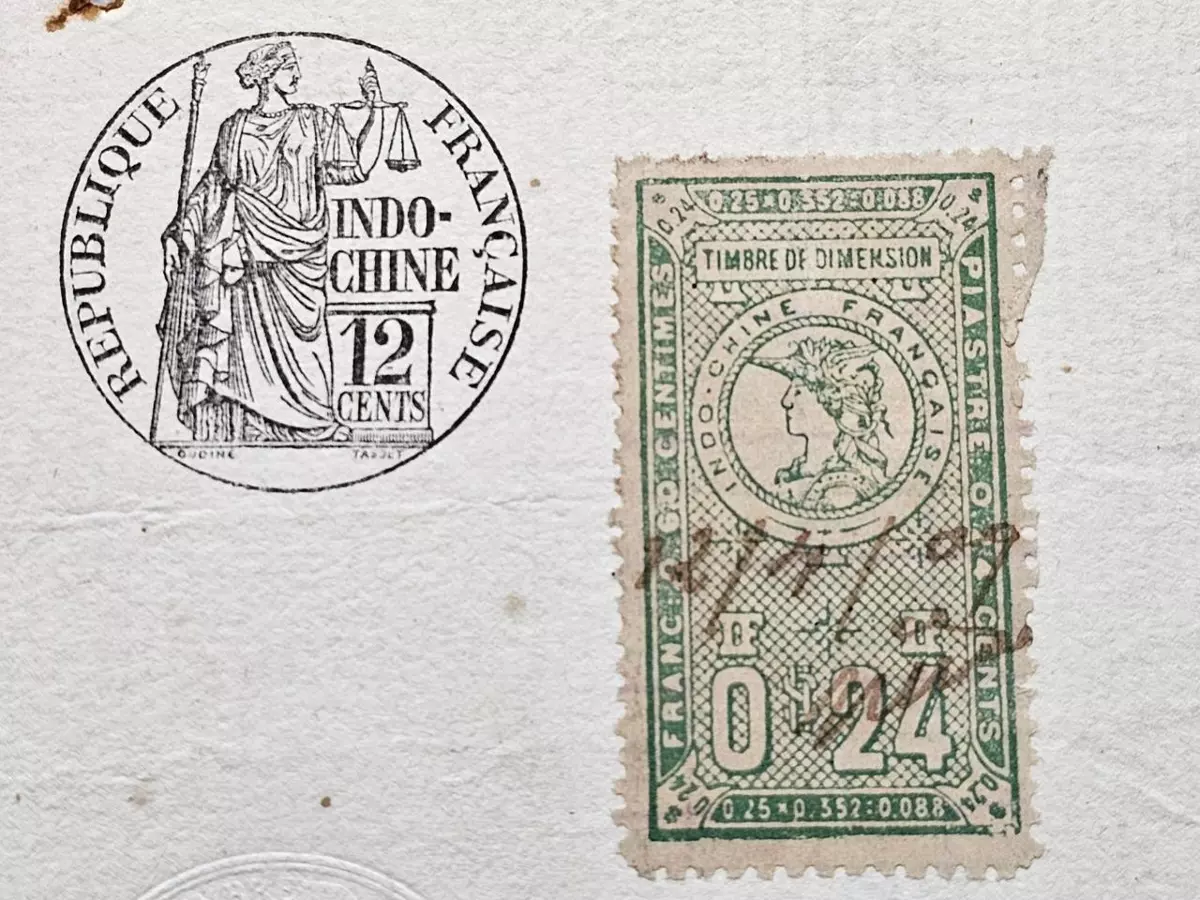

=== 21st century ===
On October 24, 2024, the National Assembly Standing Committee of Vietnam issued Resolution 1248/NQ-UBTVQH15 on the arrangement of the commune-level administrative unit of Hưng Yên province in the period of 2023–2025, which takes effect from December 1, 2024. Accordingly, Khoái Châu rural district (快州縣, huyện Khoái-châu) includes:

- 1 municipality: Khoái Châu capital-township (Phố Phủ before).
- 19 communes: An Vĩ, Bình Minh, Chí Minh, Đại Tập, Dân Tiến, Đông Kết, Đông Ninh, Đông Tảo, Đồng Tiến, Liên Khê, Nguyễn Huệ, Ông Đình, Phạm Hồng Thái, Phùng Hưng, Tân Châu, Tân Dân, Thuần Hưng, Tứ Dân, Việt Hòa.
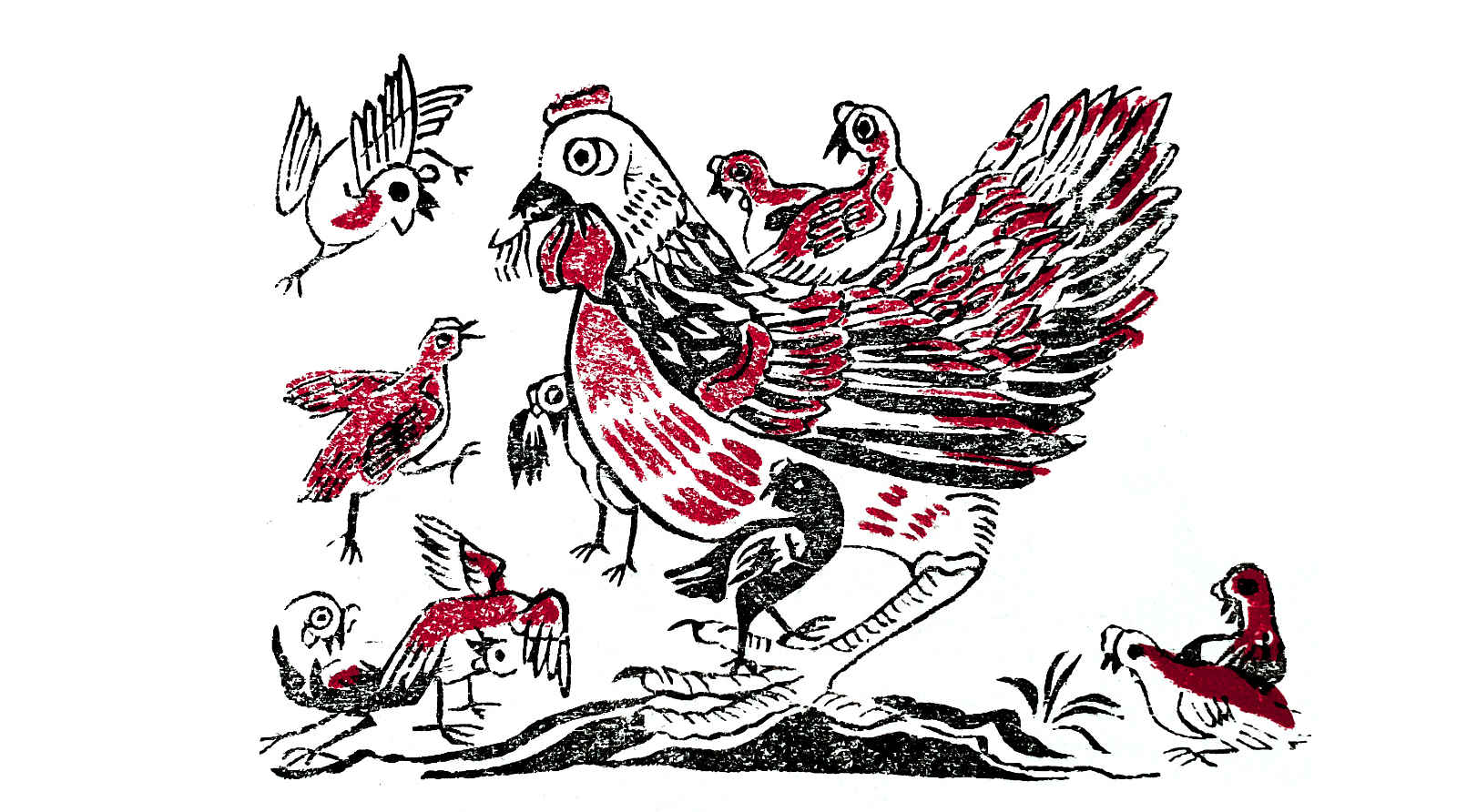
A folk picture of Dongtao Chicken

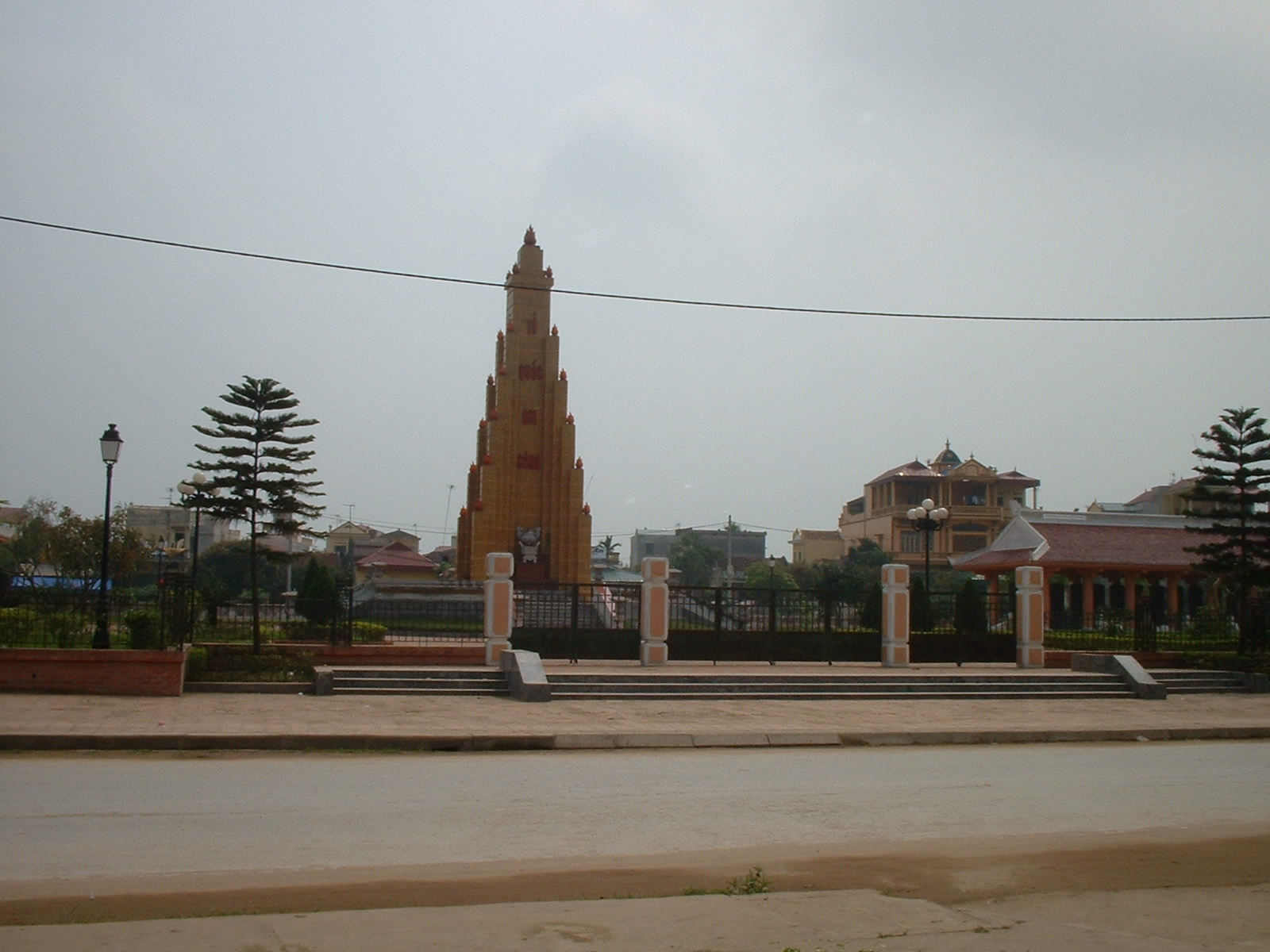
The Khoái Châu District's Martyrs Monument

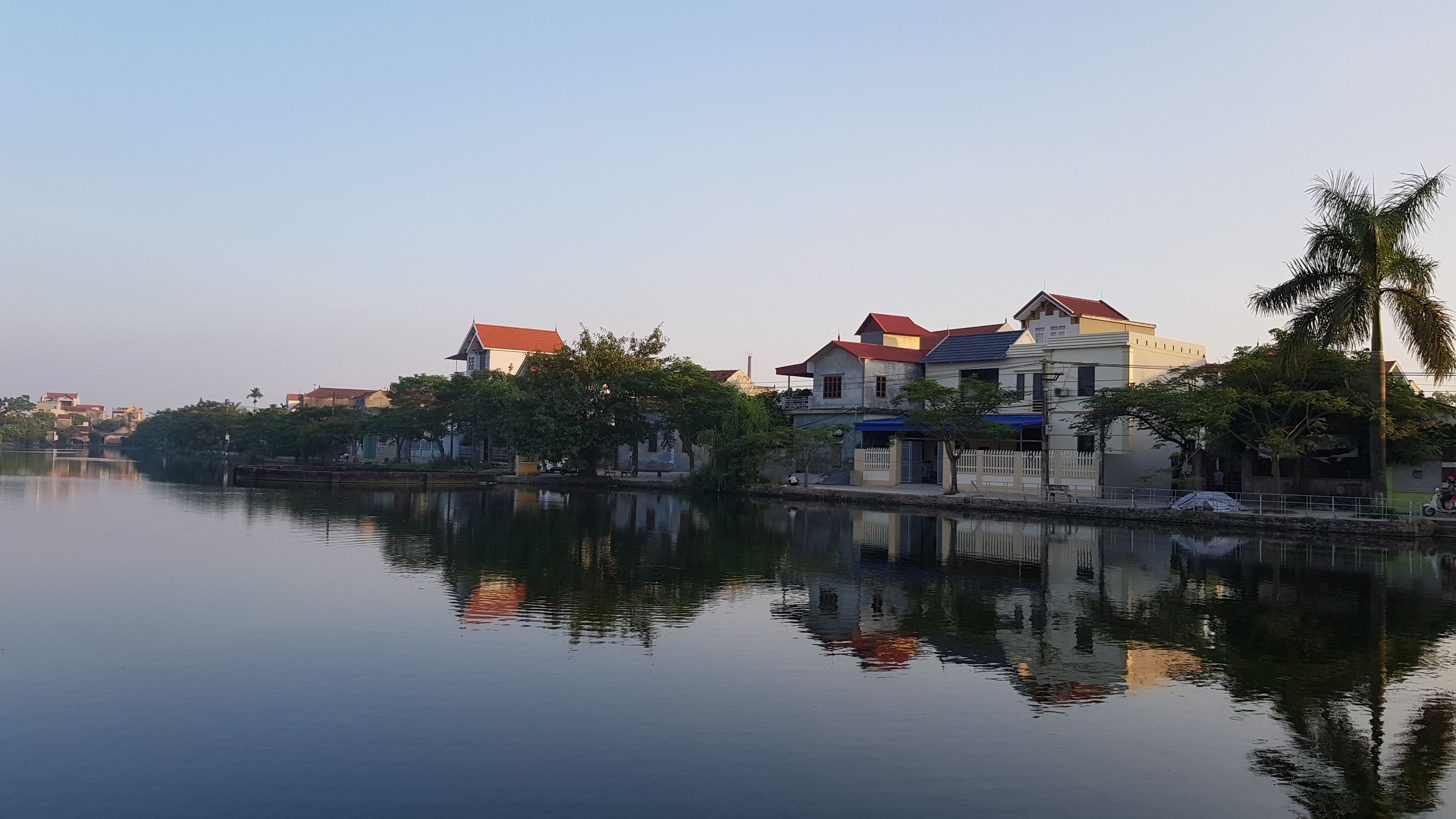
Trung Châu village, Đông Kết commune

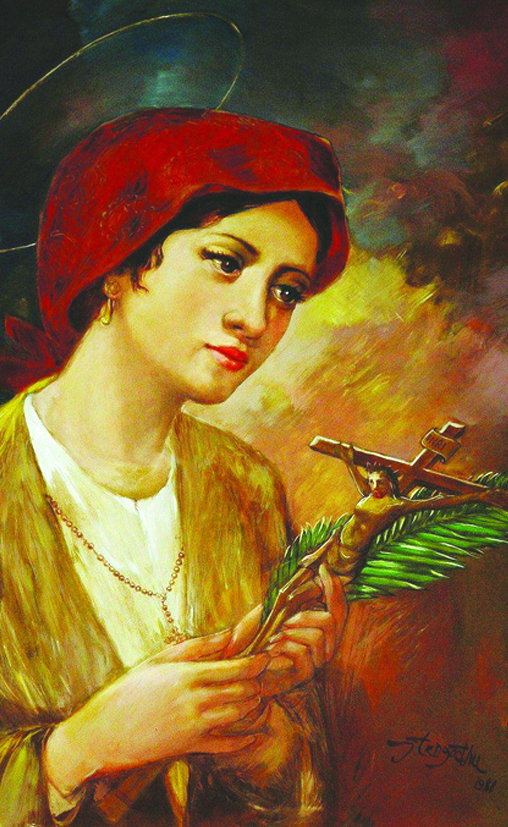
Saint Agnès Lê Thị Thành

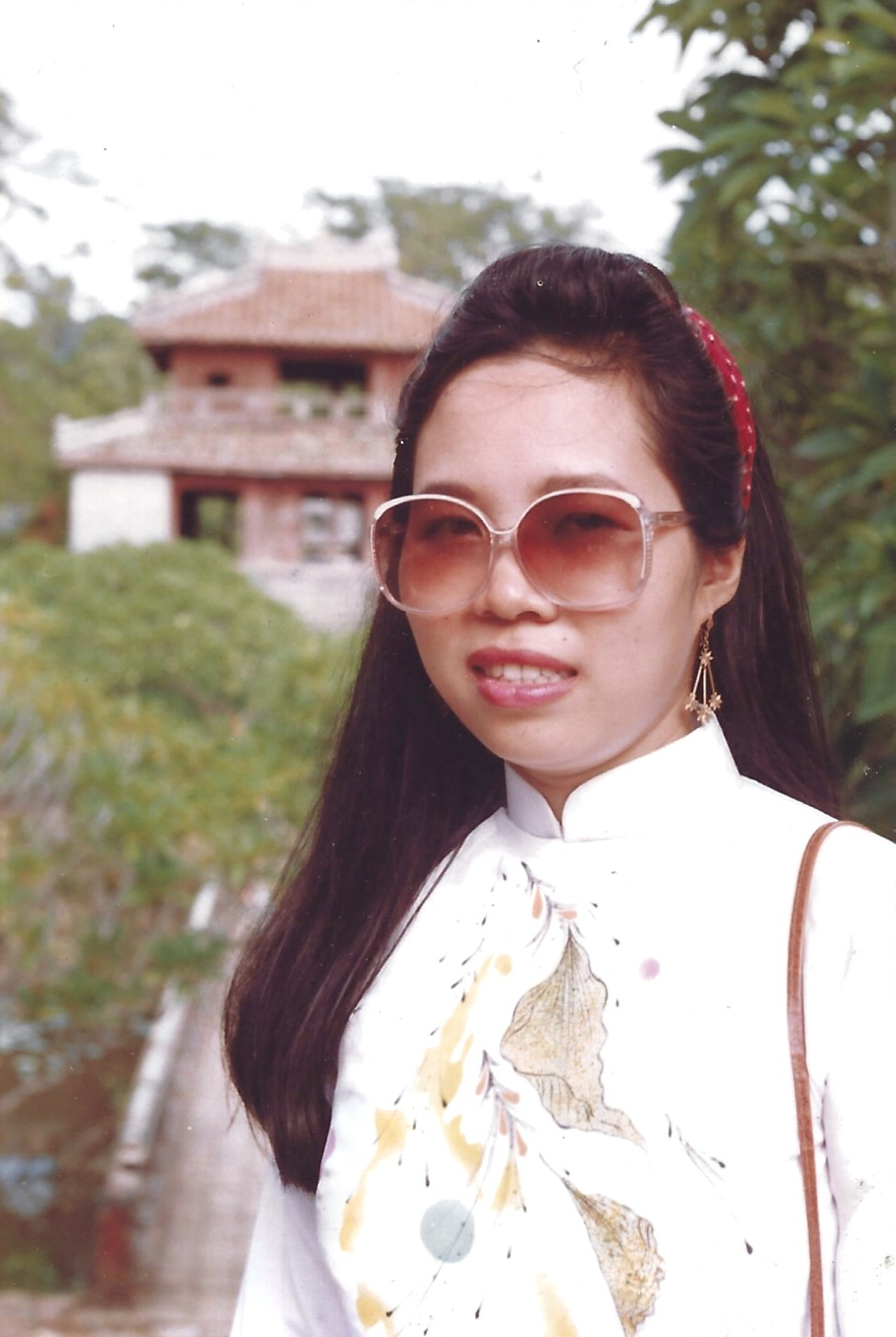
Poet and composer Thiên Ân

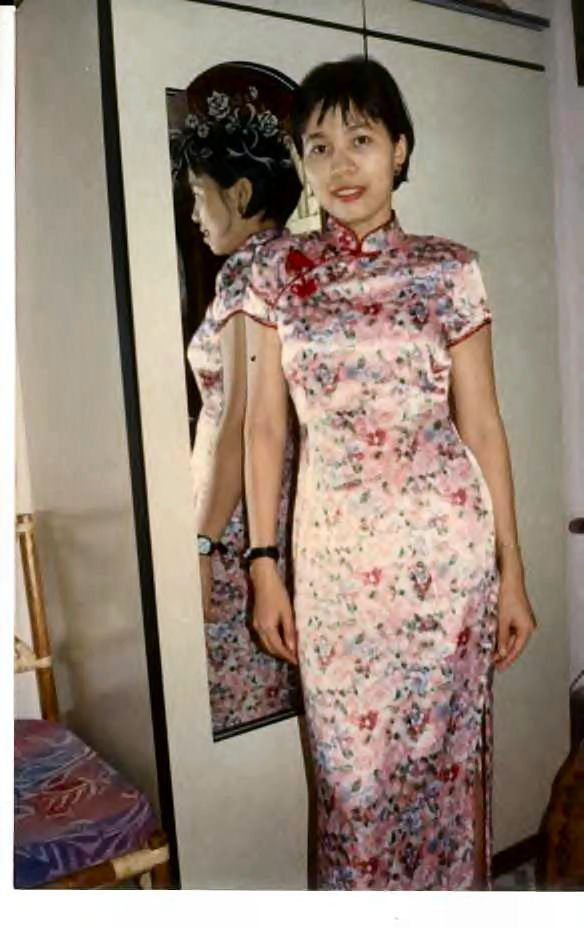
Musician Châu Bằng

== Geography ==
=== Topography ===
Khoái Châu rural district covers an area of 130.82 km^{2}. Due to the characteristics of Hưng Yên province, it is located in the center of the Red River Delta, therefore, its terrain is only low to very low. In particular, the area of Khoái Châu rural district is only from average to very low, even many places are still lower than the sea level and are in the process of being fostered by sediment.

Khoái Châu is on the left bank of the Red River. It borders Văn Giang and Yên Mỹ districts to the north, Ân Thi district to the east, Kim Động district to the south, Hanoi's Thường Tín and Phú Xuyên districts to the west. It has a part of the National Route 34 and the Ring Road 4 of the Hanoi Capital Zone. However, it only has a short river called Bần River and a part of the Red River. Besides, there is also a large swamp called Nhất Dạ Lagoon ("the lagoon of one night").

=== Demography ===
As of 2020, Khoái Châu rural district had a population of 189,070. In particular, all people are registered as Kẻ Kinh.

According to the 2005 yearbook of the Vietnam Catholic Church, the area of Khoái Châu rural district has all three parishes of An Vỹ, Sài Quất and Trung Châu, where belong the Tây Hưng Yên Deanery of the Thái Bình Cathedral Diocese.

== Culture ==
The location of Khoái Châu rural district has long belonged to the most important waterway traffic in Northern Vietnam, therefore, it has a proud thickness of customs. It is also known as one of the rural districts with the most historical monuments in Vietnam.

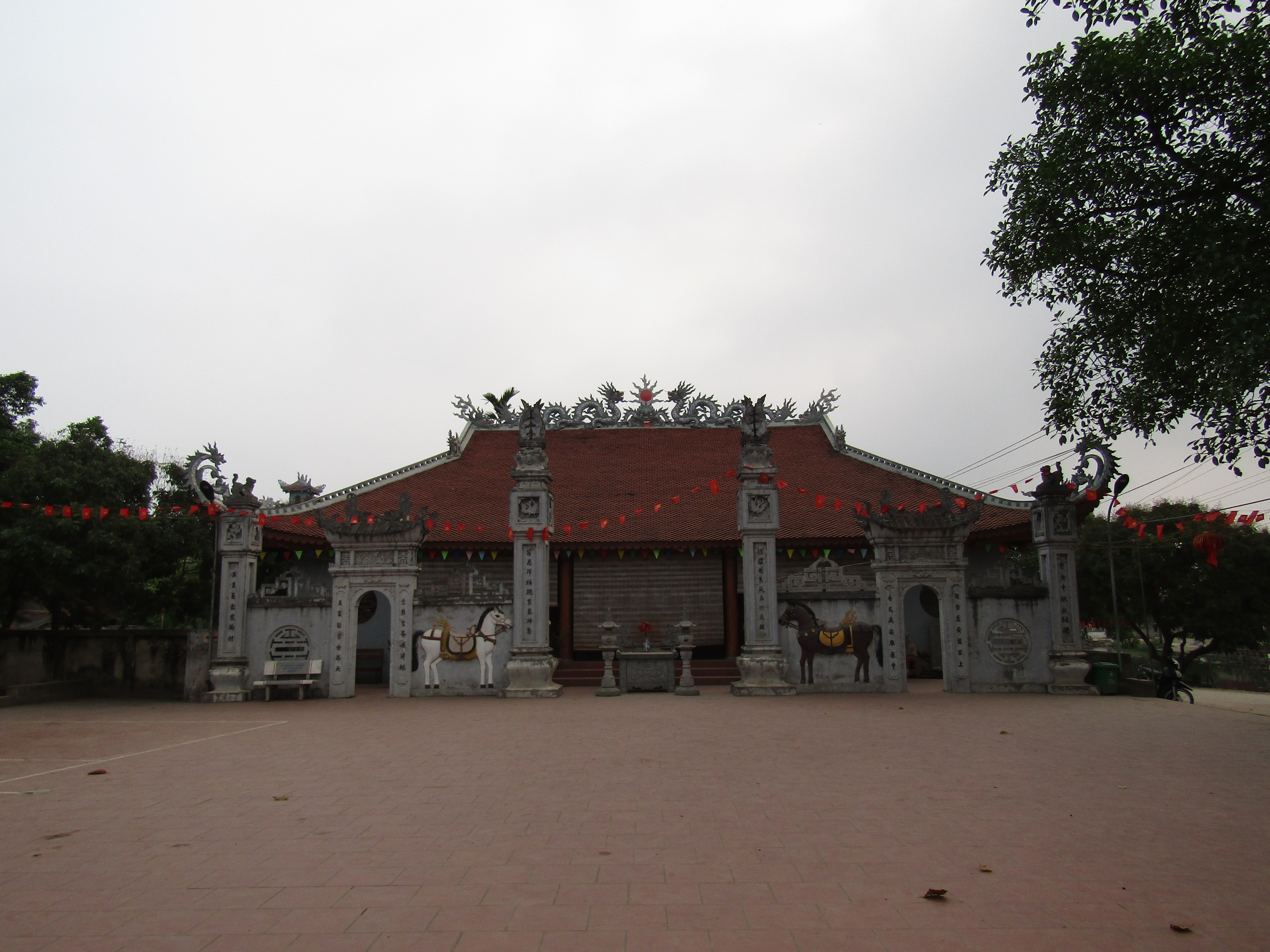
Đông Kết communal hall.

- Thổ Khối communal hall in Đồng Tiến commune, where there was typical architecture of the Revival Lê dynasty to honor the brick industry.
- Thuần Hưng commune was said to have been called as Đại Mang Bộ, where emperors Trần Thánh Tông and Trần Nhân Tông put a command camp to make important decisions leading to victory.
- Hàm Tử Quan (means "Hàm Tử estuary") in Phạm Hồng Thái commune and Tây Kết in Tứ Dân commune were associated with the victories of the Trần dynasty against the Mongol forces.
- Giàn River, a small creek was molded on the Nine Tripod Cauldrons (Cửu Đỉnh) of the Nguyễn dynasty.
- Bãi Sậy (means "mop bund") in Tân Dân commune was associated with commander Nguyễn Thiện Thuật 's uprising from 1883 to 1892.
- Nhất Dạ Lagoon, Dạ Trạch Temple in Dạ Trạch commune and Đa Hòa Temple in Bình Minh commune was said to associate of legend Princess Tiên Dung and Fisherman Chử Đồng Tử.

== Economy ==
Đông Tảo commune in Khoái Châu rural district is an administrative unit with a history recorded up to a thousand years. This location is the homeland of the chicken breed which has big feet: Dong Tao chicken (gà Đông Tảo). This breed of chicken is classified as a strategic item of the whole Hưng Yên province and has an export value of tens of millions of US dollars each year.

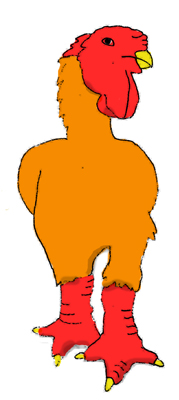

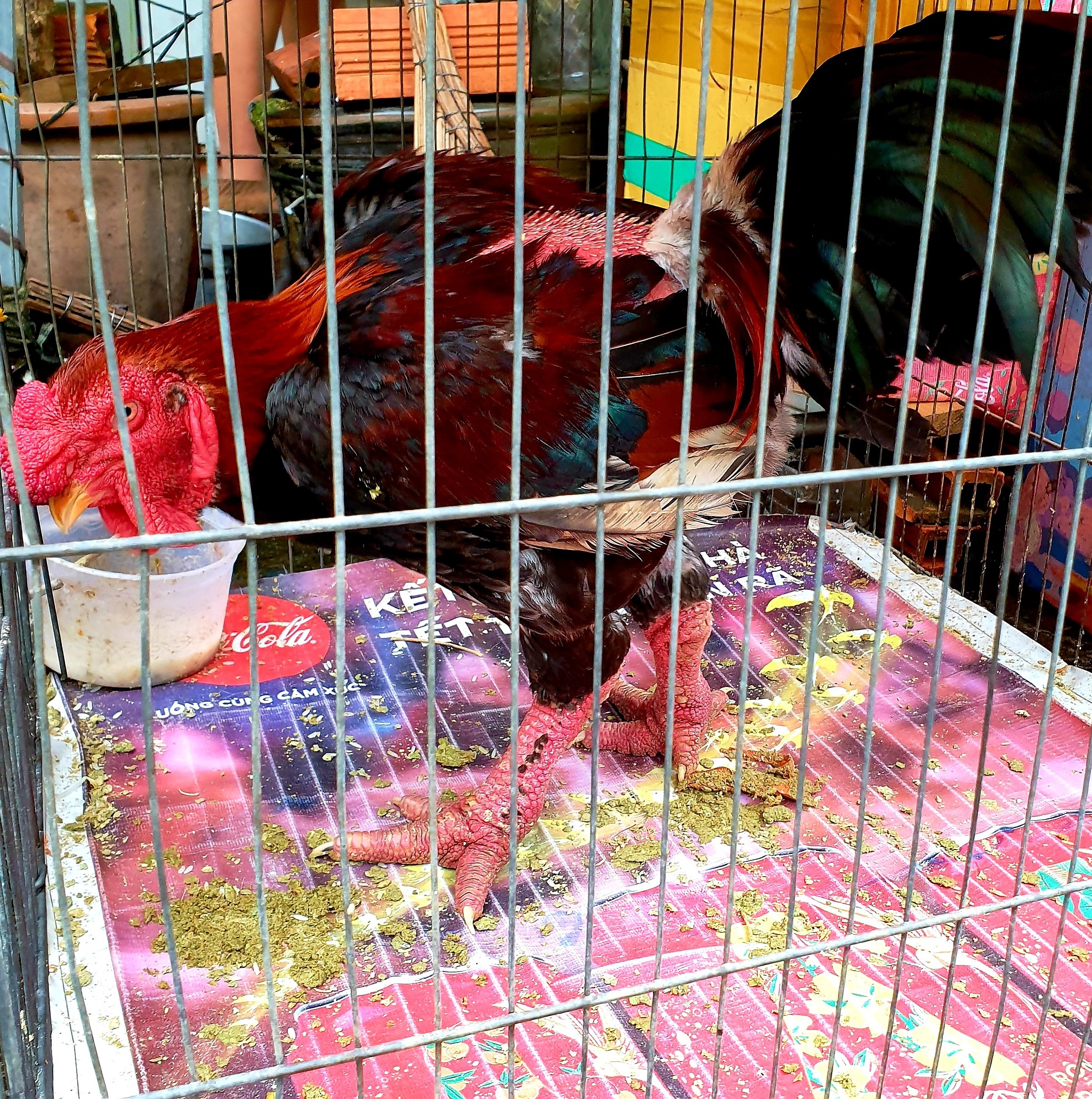

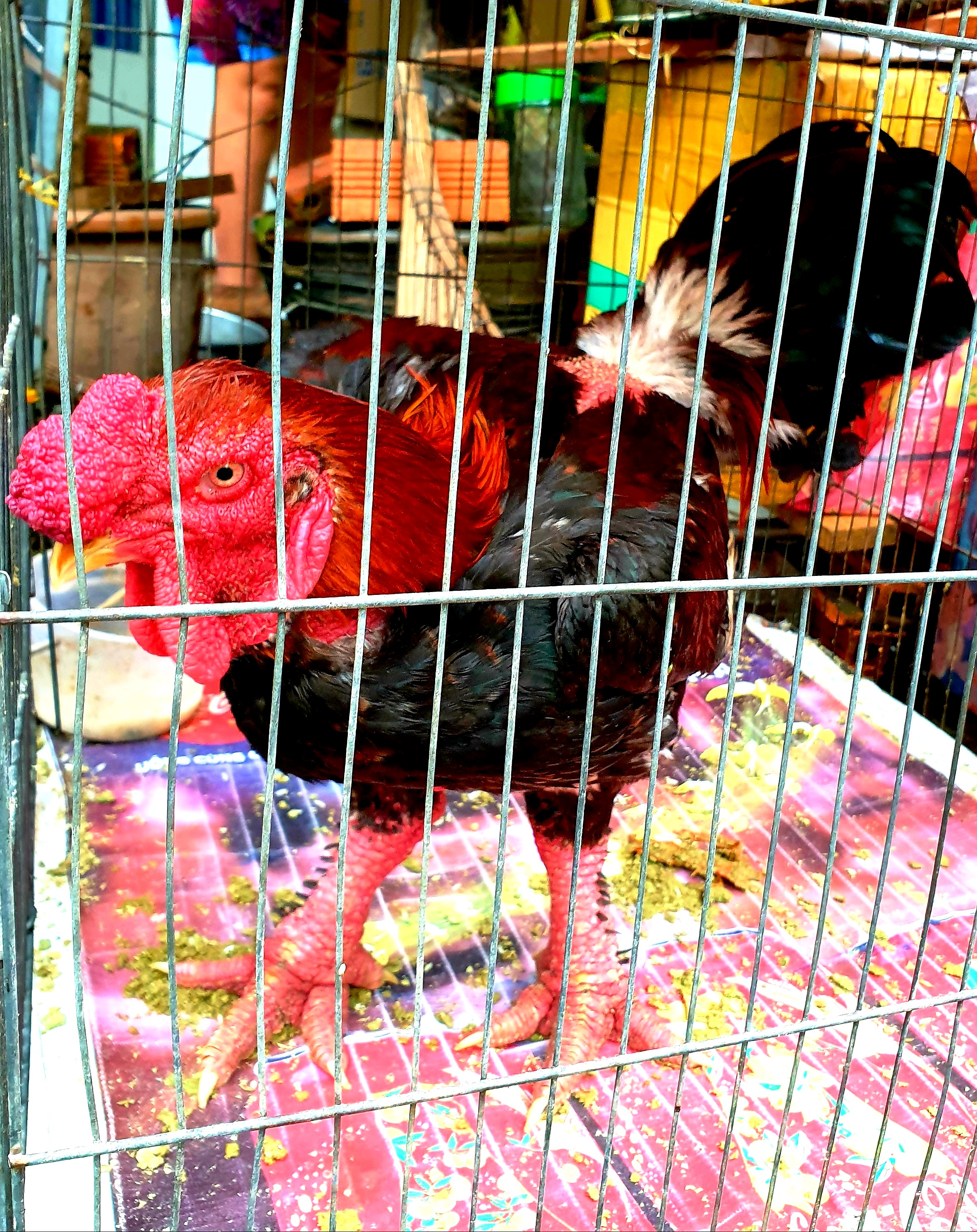

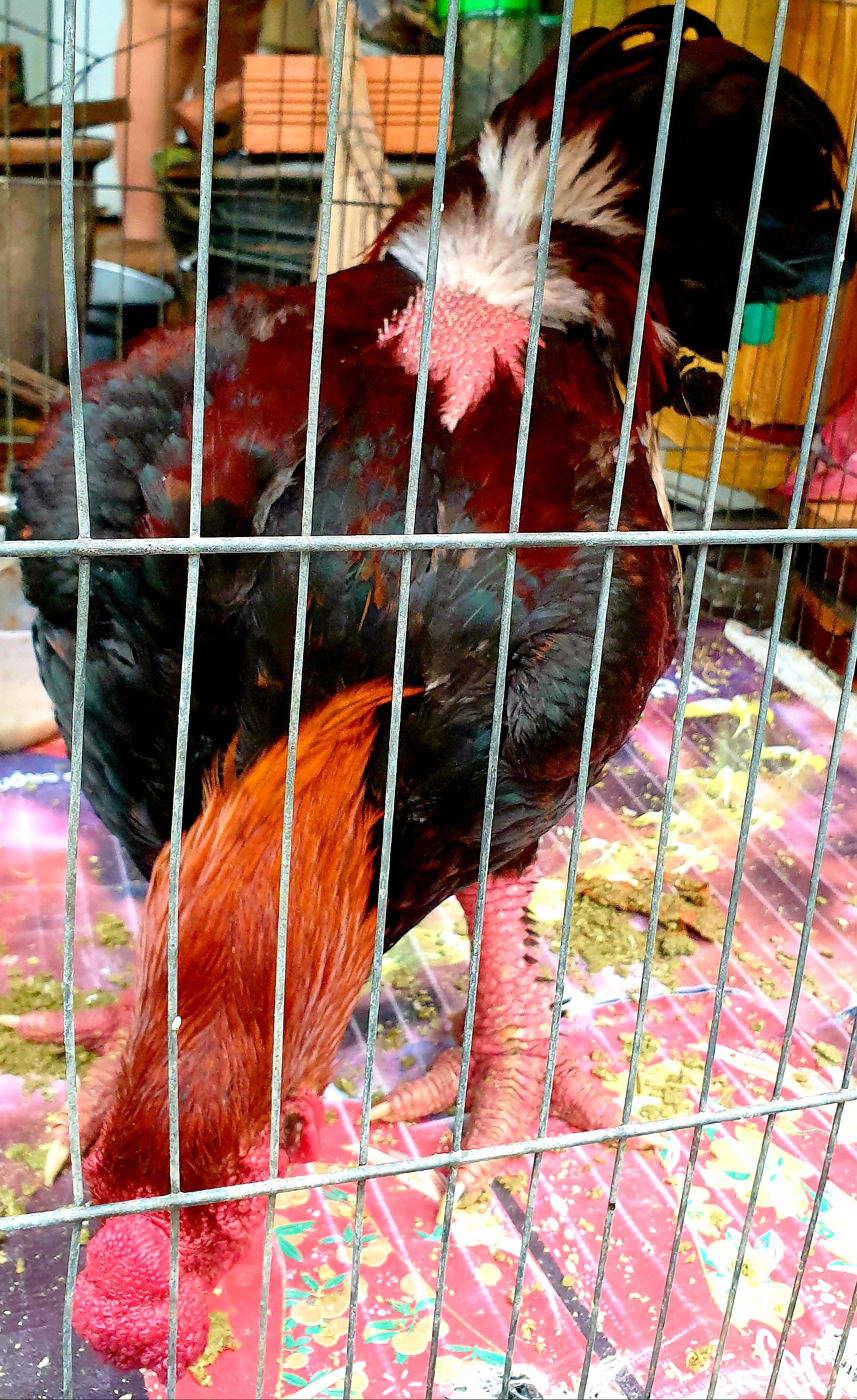

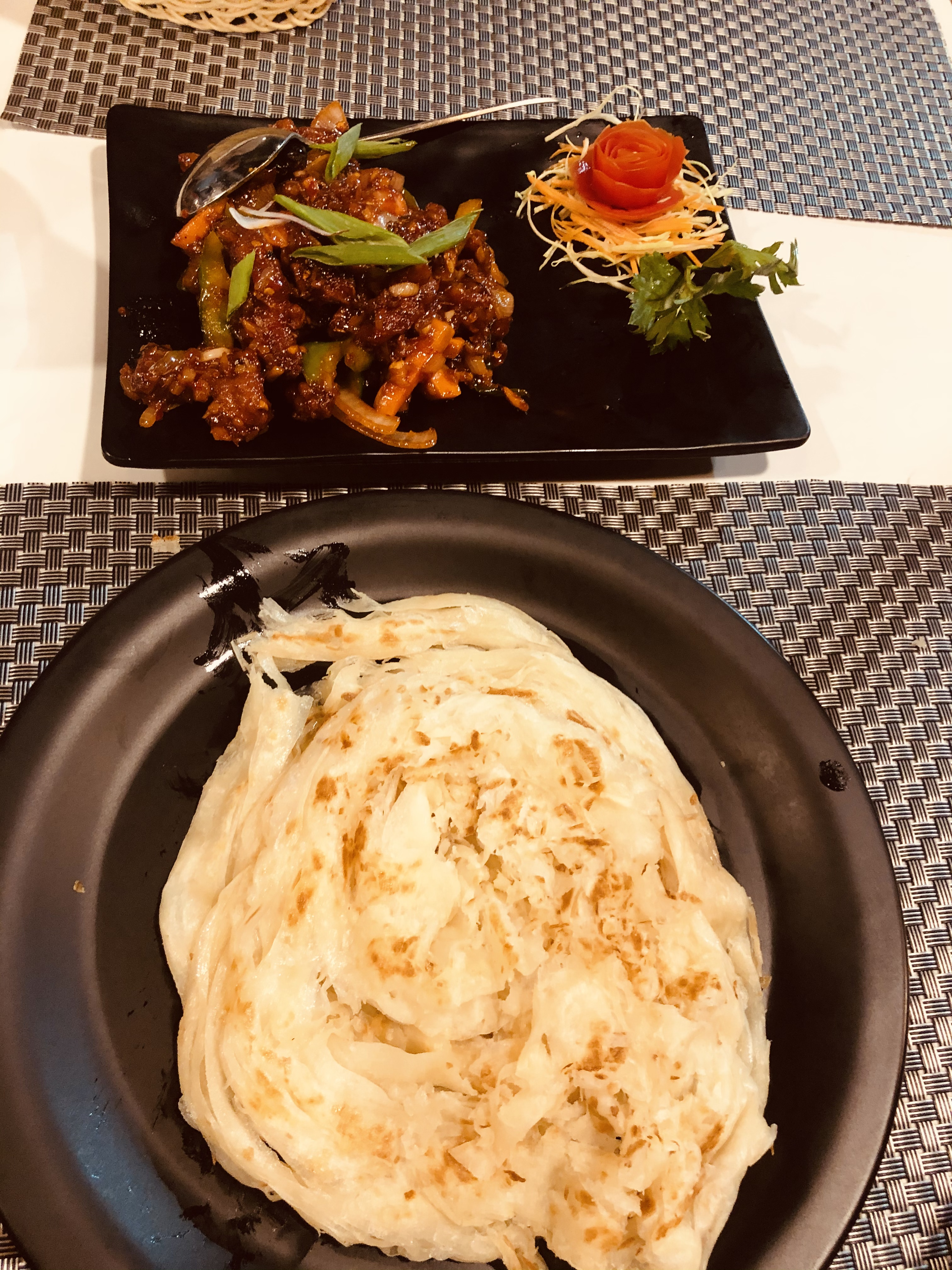

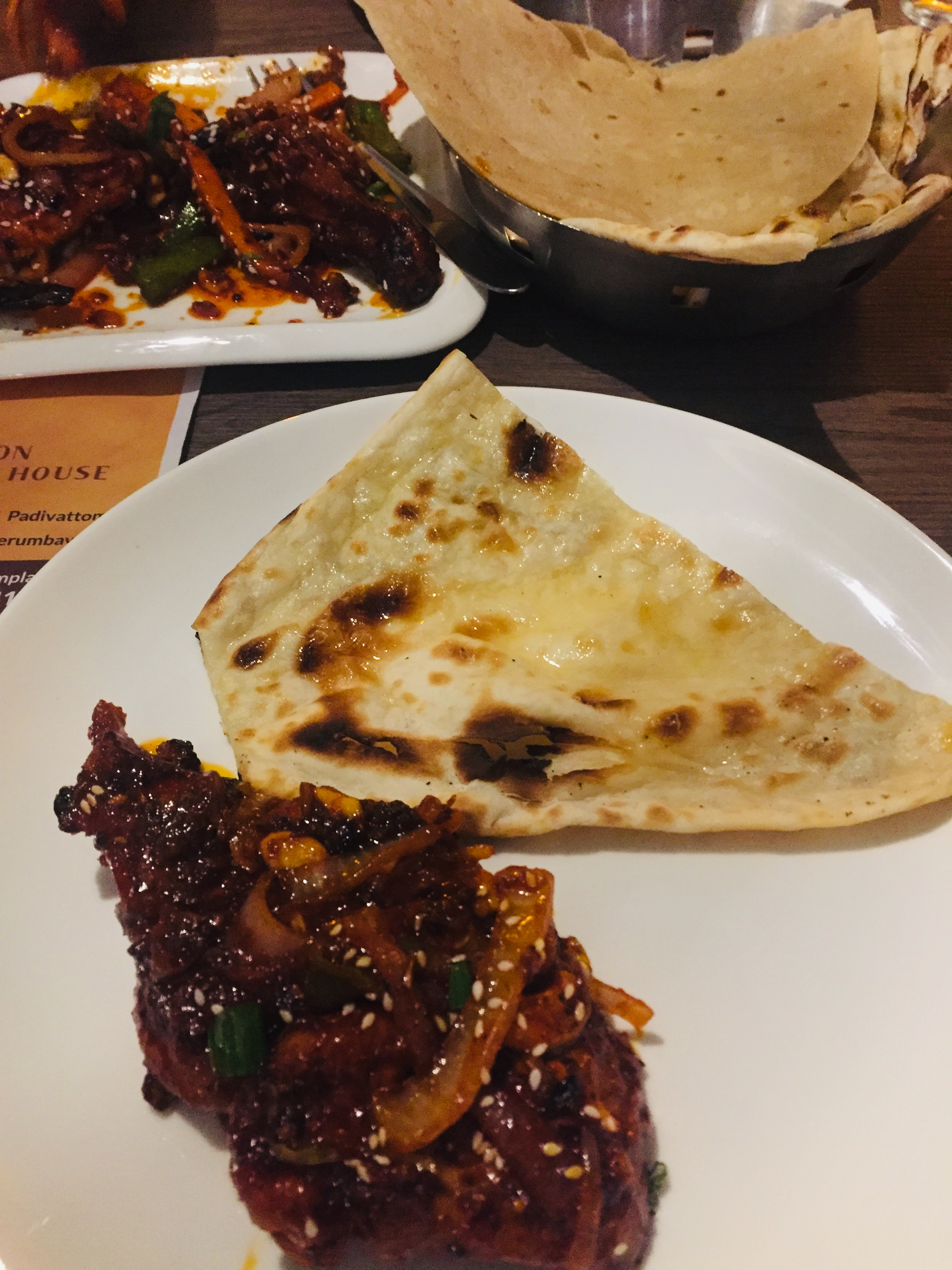

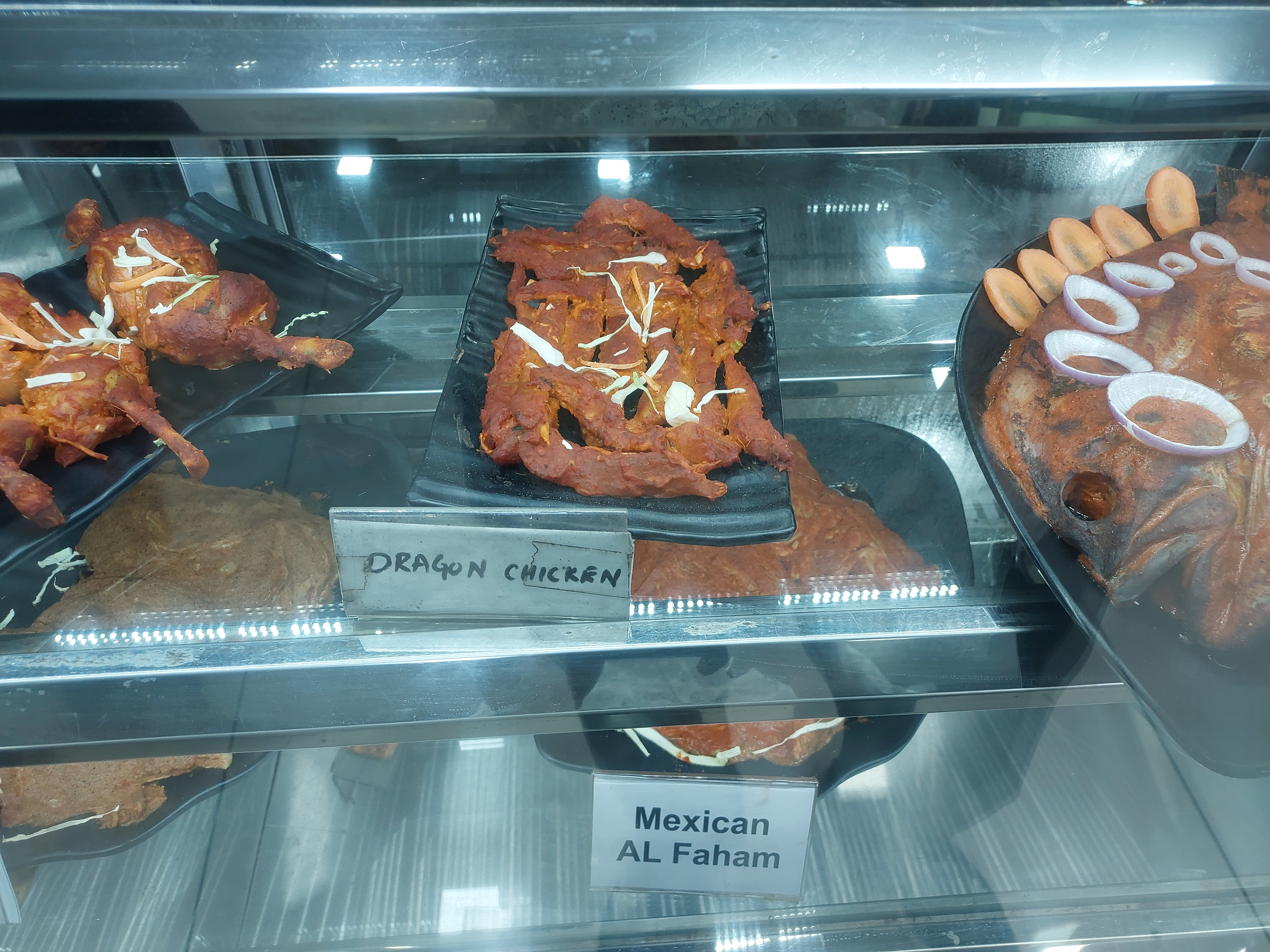

Besides, with the advantage of the domain along the Red River, Khoái Châu has a clay residue up to several tens of billion tonnes, which is known through surveys from the 1930s to 1960s. This makes a very important contribution to the Khoái Châu Brick Brand (thương hiệu Gạch Khoái Châu) existed and developed continuously for many centuries. However, this type of manual bricks are under fierce pressure from industrial brick brands.

== See also ==
- Hưng Yên (city)
- Văn Giang district
- Thường Tín district
- Phú Xuyên district
