= Khoái Châu =

Khoái Châu Xã Khoái Châu
- Commune
- Location within Vietnam
- Coordinates: 20°50′25″N 105°58′42″E
- Country: Vietnam
- Region: Red River Delta
- Province: Hưng Yên
- Establish: June 16, 2025

Area
  - Total: 11.33 sq mi (29.35 km^{2})

Population 2025
  - Total: 48.795 people
  - Density: 4.306/sq mi (1.663/km^{2})
- Time zone: UTC+7 (UTC + 7)

Khoái Châu is a commune (xã) of Hưng Yên Province, Vietnam.

== Geography ==
Khoái Châu Commune is located in the northwest of Hưng Yên Province, with the following geographical boundaries:

- To the west, it borders Châu Ninh Commune.
- To the east, it borders Việt Tiến Commune.
- To the south, it borders Chí Minh Commune.
- To the north, it borders Triệu Việt Vương Commune.

== History ==
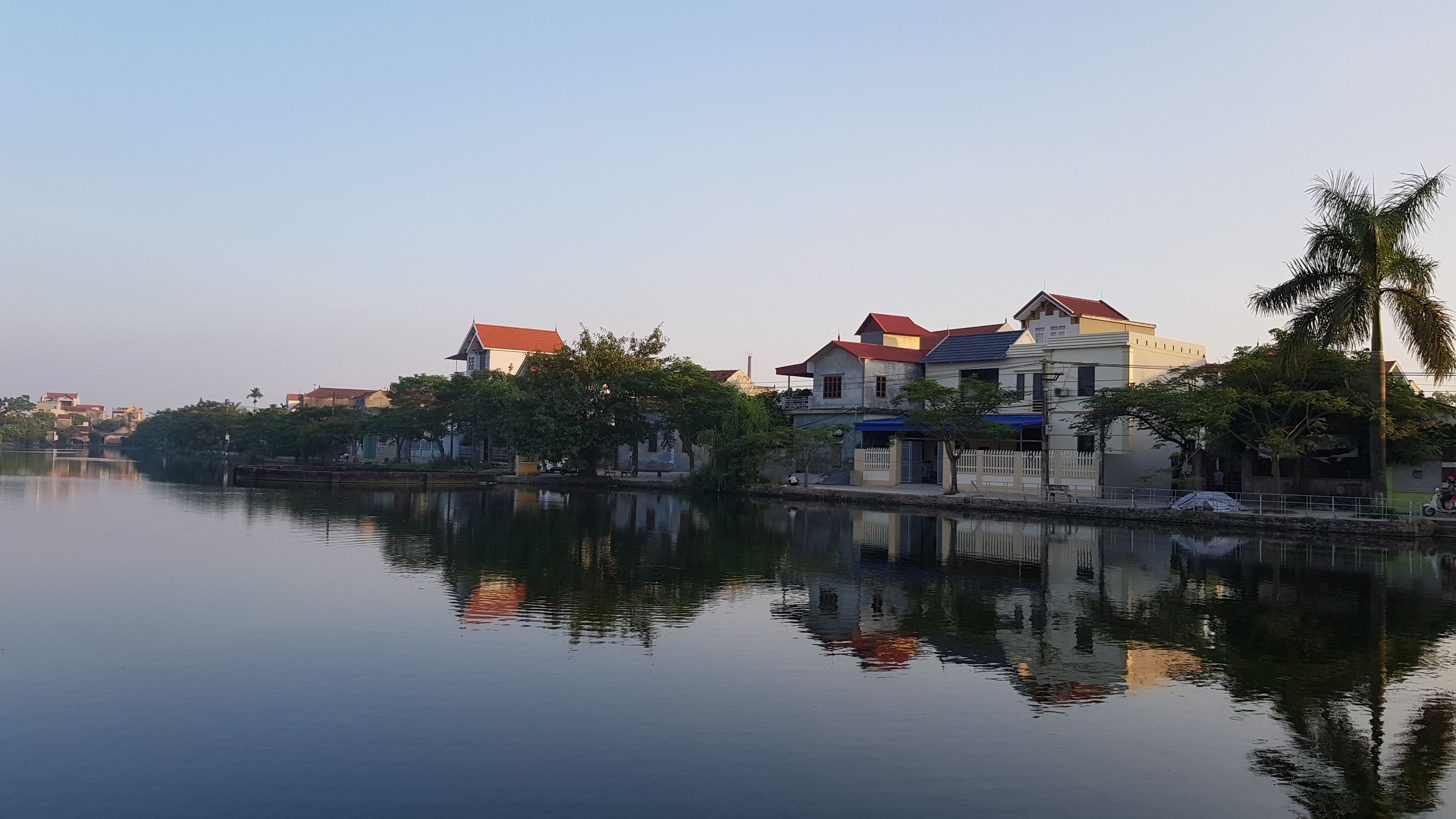
A corner of Trung Châu village.

Previously, Khoái Châu was a town within the former Châu Giang District. On September 24, 1997, the Government issued Decree 102-CP regarding the establishment of Khoái Châu Town within Châu Giang District, Hưng Yên Province, based on the following:

- The entire area and population of the former Kim Ngưu Commune (comprising 402.79 hectares of natural area and 9,662 inhabitants);
- The adjustment of 10.13 hectares of natural area from An Vĩ Commune.

On July 24, 1999, the Government issued Decree No. 60/1999/ND-CP regarding the transfer of Khoái Châu Town—formerly under the old Châu Giang District—to the newly re-established Khoái Châu District for administration.

On June 16, 2025, the National Assembly Standing Committee issued Resolution No. 1666/NQ-UBTVQH15 regarding the arrangement of commune-level administrative units in Hưng Yên Province in 2025. Accordingly, the entire natural area and population of Khoái Châu Town and the communes of Liên Khê, Phùng Hưng, and Đông Kết were consolidated to form a new commune named "Khoái Châu Commune."

== Culture ==
Lạc Thủy Pagoda (in Lạc Thủy Hamlet) is an ancient temple housing numerous antique statues dating back to a very distant past.

The Dragon Temple Pond and the Dragon Temple (in Lạc Thủy Hamlet) are associated with a local legend: A villager who worked as a temple clapper-keeper went to sit for the imperial examinations and passed with honors. However, upon his return, none of the villagers came out to welcome him, as they looked down on the newly appointed scholar due to his humble origins. Enraged, the scholar drew his sword, severed the head of the stone dragon enshrined within the village temple, and cast a curse declaring that, from that day forward, no one from this village would ever attain an official position again; he then departed. Consequently, village elders have passed down the belief that, for generations to come, the descendants of this village would be unable to achieve success in their official careers. Thốp Pagoda is a large and sacred temple. Every year, it welcomes a multitude of Buddhist who come to offer prayers and visit the site.

Hậu Temple—located in Đông Kết Hamlet, Đông Kết Commune, Khoái Châu District, Hưng Yên Province—also enshrines and worships the warlord Nguyễn Siêu, alongside a general from the era of the Hùng Kings. Legend has it that after suffering defeat at the hands of Đinh Bộ Lĩnh, Nguyễn Siêu died; his body drifted into the territory of Đông Kết Commune, where it remained uncorrupted for three months, his complexion remaining as fresh as it was when he was alive. Consequently, the local people revered him as a tutelary deity and erected a temple in his honor.
