= Bãi Sậy uprising =

Anti-French revolt in the Hưng Yên Province of northern Việt Nam

The Bãi Sậy revolt (1885-1889, Khởi nghĩa Bãi Sậy) was an anti-French revolt led by Nguyễn Thiện Thuật (alias Tán Thuật). It takes its name from the swampy Bãi Sậy "Field of Reeds" area in Văn Giang and Khoái Châu districts, Hưng Yên province.

Apart from Nguyễn Thiện Thuật, the other leaders were vi:Nguyễn Thiện Kế, Nguyễn Thiện Dương, Nguyễn Thiện Tuyển, Nguyễn Thiện Thường, vi:Đốc Tít, vi:Tạ Hiện and vi:Nguyễn Cao.
