= Nguyễn Thiện Thuật =

Vietnamese revolutionary leader

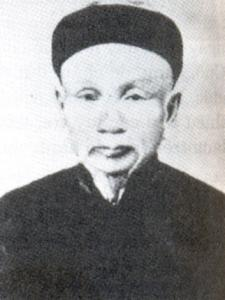
- Born: March 23, 1844; Hưng Yên, Vietnam
- Died: 1926 (aged 81–82); Guangxi, China
- Other name: Tán Thuật
- Occupations: Official, revolutionist
- Children: Nguyễn Tuyển Chi (Cả Tuyển, courtesy name: Thận Sinh); Nguyễn Thạc Chi (Hai Thạc, Nguyễn Trọng Thạc, Nguyễn Trọng Thường, courtesy name: Thường Sinh)
- Relatives: Nguyễn Thiện Kế (Hai Kế); Nguyễn Thiện Hiển; Nguyễn Thiện Dương (Lãnh Giang)

Nguyễn Thiện Thuật (阮善述, 1844–1926), courtesy name Mạnh Hiếu, was a Vietnamese revolutionary leader, who commanded armed forces during the anti-colonial struggle.

As a high-ranking official under the Nguyễn dynasty, he governed Hải Dương, Hải Phòng, and Quảng Ninh. After the second lost of Hà Nội citadel, the Nguyễn regime signed the Treaty of Huế (also known as the Harmand treaty) and acknowledged the French protectorate over the northern and central parts of the Vietnam. When he was ordered to stop fighting, Nguyễn resigned from his post and retreated to Đông Triều, where he organized and continued armed resistance against the French. He also joined forces with the Black Flag Army led by Lưu Vĩnh Phúc. A nine-year revolt (from 1883 to 1892) ensued in the swampy area of Bãi Sậy. Due to constant attacks from the French, the resistance was weakened. Nguyễn left for China, with the hope of reviving the revolution at a later time, but died in Guangxi in 1926.

His grandson was Chinese Nationalist Army major general Nguyễn Chấn Á who returned to Vietnam as one of the Taiwan military advisors. (Note: There is no official Vietnamese sources mentioned this relative.)

== Early years ==
Nguyễn Thiện Thuật was born on March 23, 1844, in Xuân Dục village, Đường Hào district (currently is Xuân Đào village, Xuân Dục commune, Mỹ Hào town, Hưng Yên province), was the eldest child of a poor Confucian, he was a descendant of Nguyễn Trãi. His father was lecturer Nguyễn Tuy. His younger brothers were Nguyễn Thiện Dương and Nguyễn Thiện Kế, they both participated in Bãi Sậy uprising that was led by Tán Thuật.

In 1870, he graduated tú tài (秀才 junior bachelor). In 1874, he was appointed to Bang biện due to his merit in fighting the enemy in Kinh Môn, Hải Dương province. In 1876, he continued to take part in Confucianism examination and got cử nhân (舉人 senior bachelor) degree. After that, he was promoted to Tri phủ (Prefect) of Từ Sơn fu (Note: Từ Sơn fu now are Từ Sơn city, Bắc Ninh city and 3 other districts of Bắc Ninh province), Bắc Ninh province.

== Memory ==
The first Main Force unit in Quảng Trị province of Vietnam Liberation Army was named after Nguyễn Thiện Thuật in August Revolution.

A commune of Kiến Xương district, Thái Bình province was named after Tán Thuật from 1947 to 2002.
