= Hải Hưng province =

Historic province of Vietnam

Hải Hưng Province Tỉnh Hải Hưng
- Province of * the Democratic Republic of Vietnam (1968–1976): the Socialist Republic of Vietnam (1976–1996)
- 1968–1996
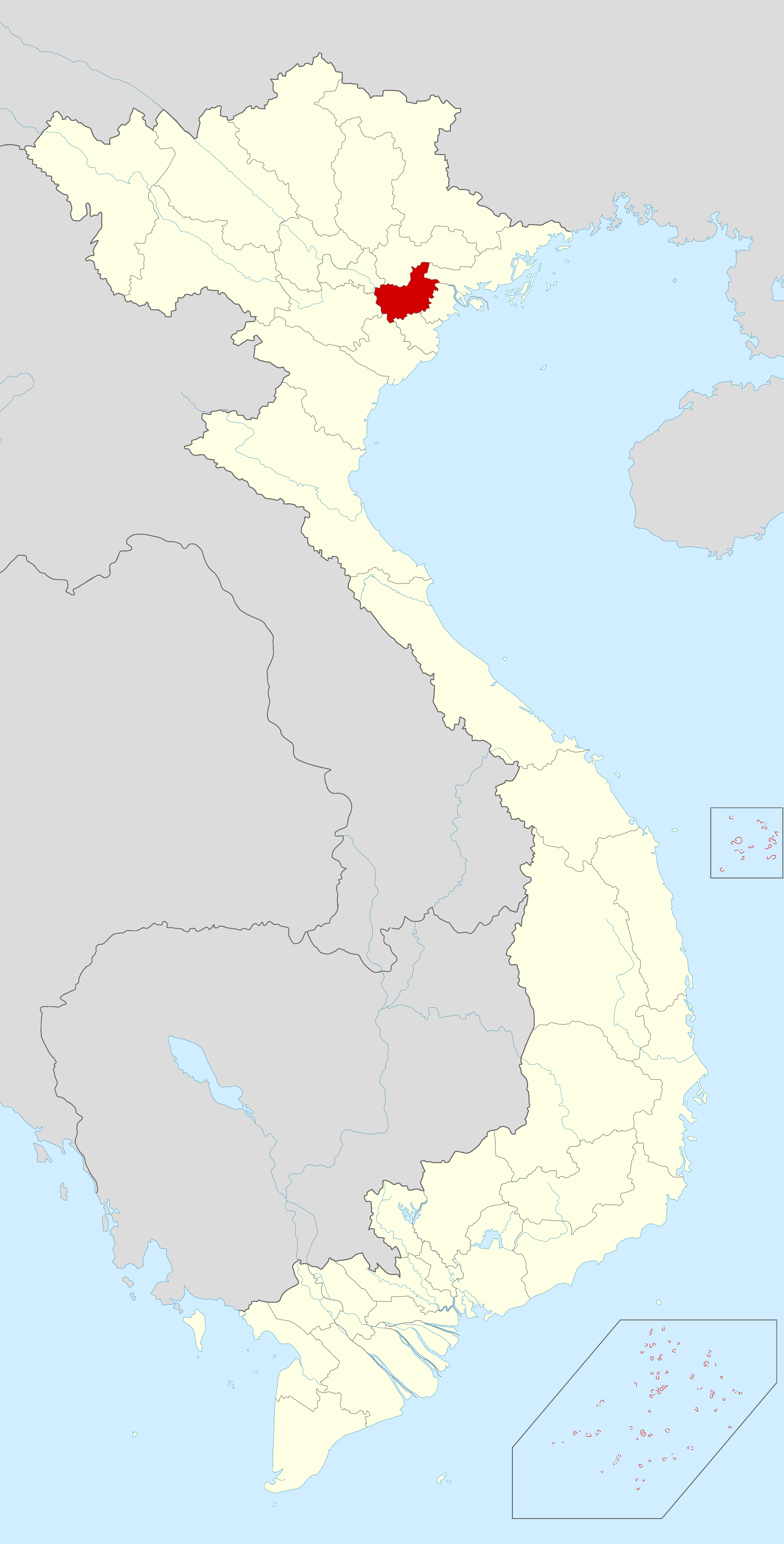
- Hải Hưng province on the administrative map of Vietnam in 1976.
- Capital: Hải Dương
- Historical era: 20th century
  - Established: 26 January 1968
  - Disestablished: 6 November 1996
- Subdivisions
  - Type: Districts, towns, communes
Preceded by	Succeeded by
Hải Dương province; Hưng Yên province	Hải Dương province; Hưng Yên province

Hải Hưng (pronounced "high-hung") is a former province in the Red River Delta of Vietnam. It was established in 1968. On November 6, 1996, Hải Hưng was split into two provinces: Hải Dương and Hưng Yên. Now it's a part of Hải Phòng city and Hưng Yên province

The capital of Hải Hưng is Hải Dương. Hải Hưng had one town (Hưng Yên), and ten districts: Chí Linh, Kim Môn, Nam Thanh, Cẩm Bình, Tứ Lộc, Ninh Thanh, Mỹ Văn, Châu Giang, Kim Thi and Phù Tiên.

== Geography ==
- The North borders Hà Bắc and Hà Nội
- The South borders Thái Bình and Hà Nam Ninh
- The East borders on the province Quảng Ninh and Hải Phòng
- The West borders Hà Sơn Bình.

== History ==
On January 26, 1968, according to the Resolution of the Standing Committee Vietnam National Assembly, the two provinces Hai Duong and Hung Yen merged into Hai Hung province. When merging, the province has two towns—Hai Duong town (the provincial capital) and Hung Yen town—and 20 districts: Ân Thi, Bình Giang, Cẩm Giàng, Chí Linh, Gia Lộc, Khoái Châu, Kim Động, Kim Thành, Kinh Môn, Mỹ Hào, Nam Sách, Ninh Giang, Phù Cừ, Thanh Hà, Thanh Miện, Tiên Lữ, Tứ Kỳ, Văn Giang, Văn Lâm, and Yên Mỹ.

After merging the province, districts also proceeded to consolidate.

In 1977, it merged Cam Giang and Binh Giang into a district Cam Binh.

In 1979, merged Kim Thanh and Kinh Mon into a district Kim Mon; Nam Sach and Thanh Ha into districts Nam Thanh; Tu Ky and Gia Loc become a district Tu Loc; Thanh Mien and Ninh Giang into districts Ninh Thanh.

The year 1977, merged Phu Cu and Tien Lu into district Phu Tien, Van Giang and Yen My into district Van Yen, Van Lam and My Hao into a district Van My.

In 1979, the 14 communes of the district Van Yen were merged (including most of the old Yen My district) and the district Van My into a district My Van; merging the remaining 14 communes of Van Yen district (including most of old Van Giang district) and Khoai Chau district into district Chau Giang; Kim Động and An Thi into districts Kim Thi.

Thus, the administrative unit of the province by the beginning of 1996 includes Hai Duong town (the provincial capital), Hung Yen town, 10 districts: Cam Binh, Chau Giang, Chi Linh, Kim Mon, Kim Thi, My Van, Nam Thanh, Ninh Thanh, Phu Tien, Tu Loc.

On January 27, 1996, Kim Thi district divided into two districts Kim Động and An Thi, divided Ninh Thanh district into 2 districts: Ninh Giang and Thanh Mien, dividing Tu Loc district into two districts: Tu Ky and Gia Loc as before the merger.

By the end of 1996, the administrative units of the province include Hai Duong town (the provincial capital), Hung Yen town and 13 districts: An Thi, Cam Binh, Chau Giang, Chi Linh, Gia Loc, Kim Động, Kim Mon, My Van, Nam Thanh, Ninh Giang, Phu Tien, Thanh Mien, Tu Ky.

On November 6, 1996, the 10th session of the IXth National Assembly issued a resolution to divide Hai Hung province to re-establish Hai Duong and Hung Yen provinces.

- The province Hai Duong includes Hai Duong town and 8 districts: Cam Binh, Chi Linh, Gia Loc, Kim Mon, Nam Thanh, Ninh Giang, Thanh Mien, Tu Ky.
- The province Hung Yen includes Hung Yen town and 5 districts: An Thi, Chau Giang, Kim Động, My Van, Phu Tien.
