= Hải Dương (city) =

Former provincial city of the former Hải Dương province in Vietnam

- Provincial city (Class-1)
- Hải Dương City; Thành phố Hải Dương
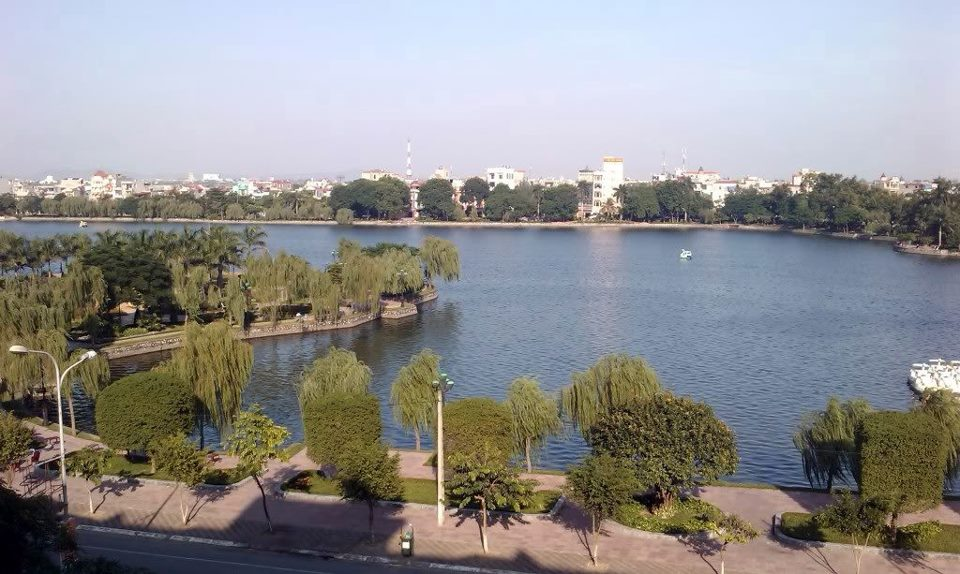
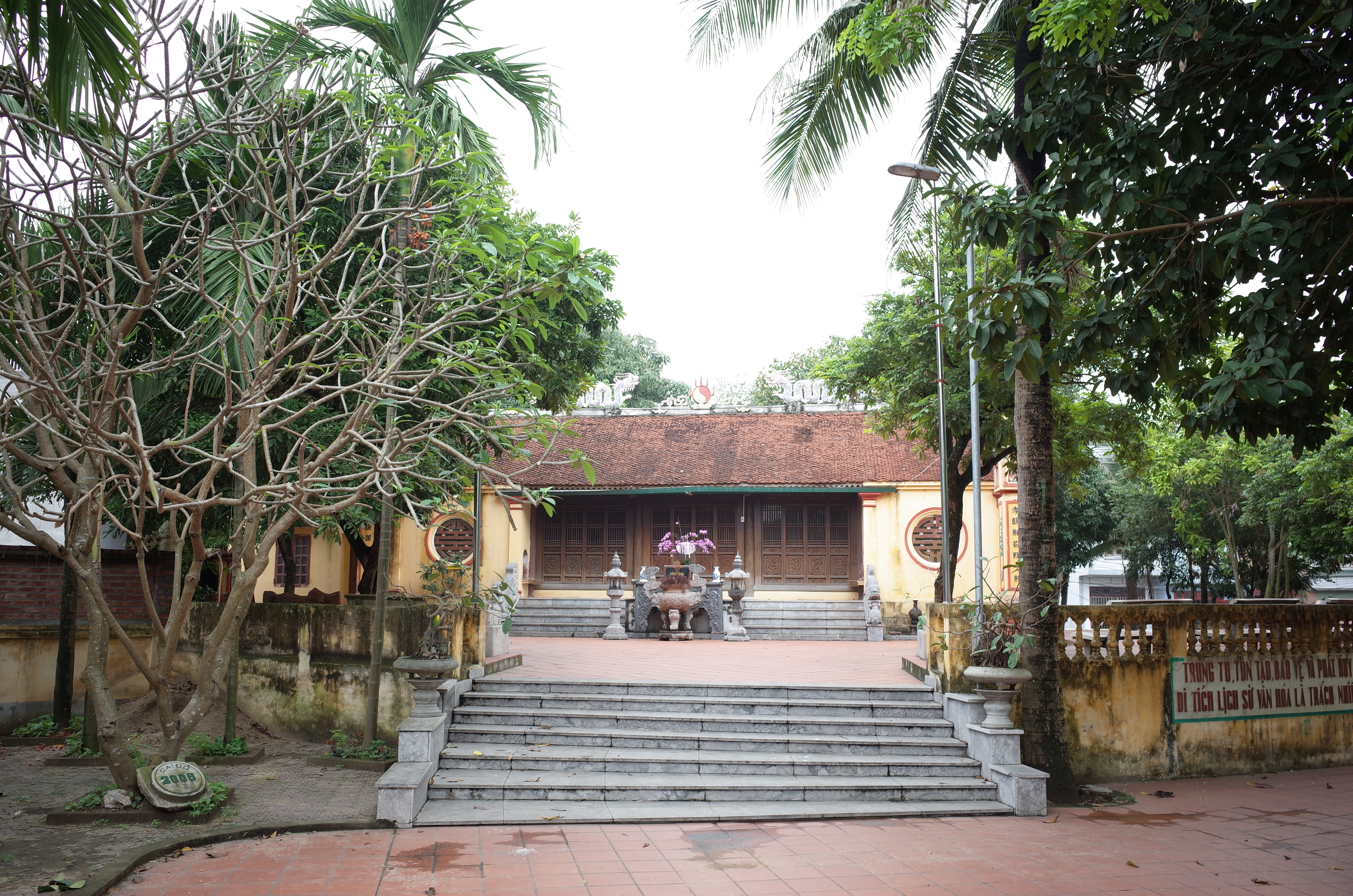
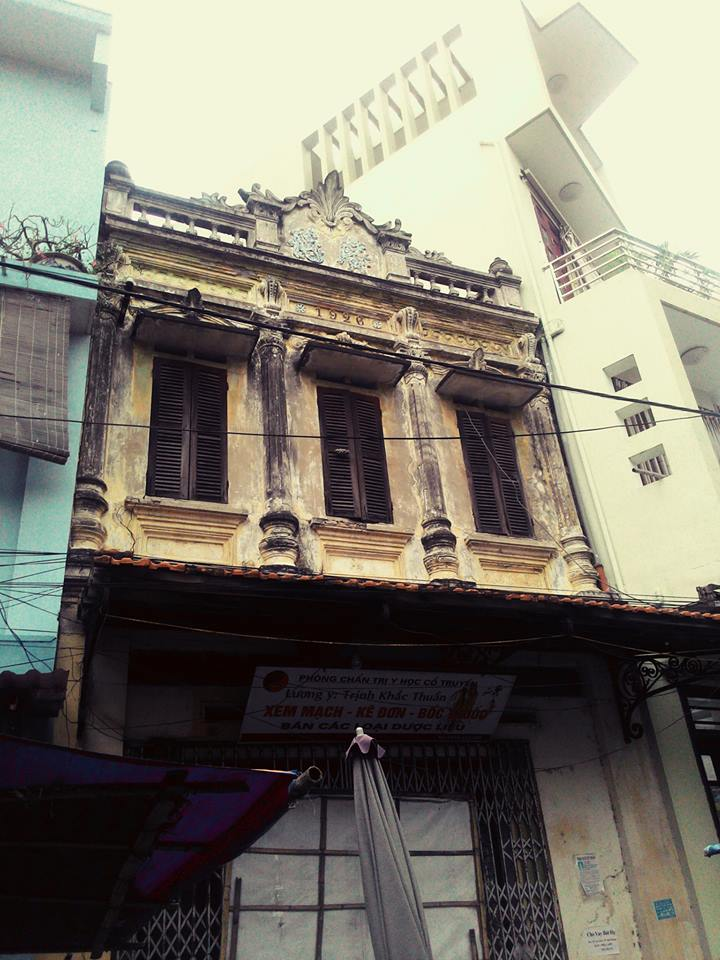
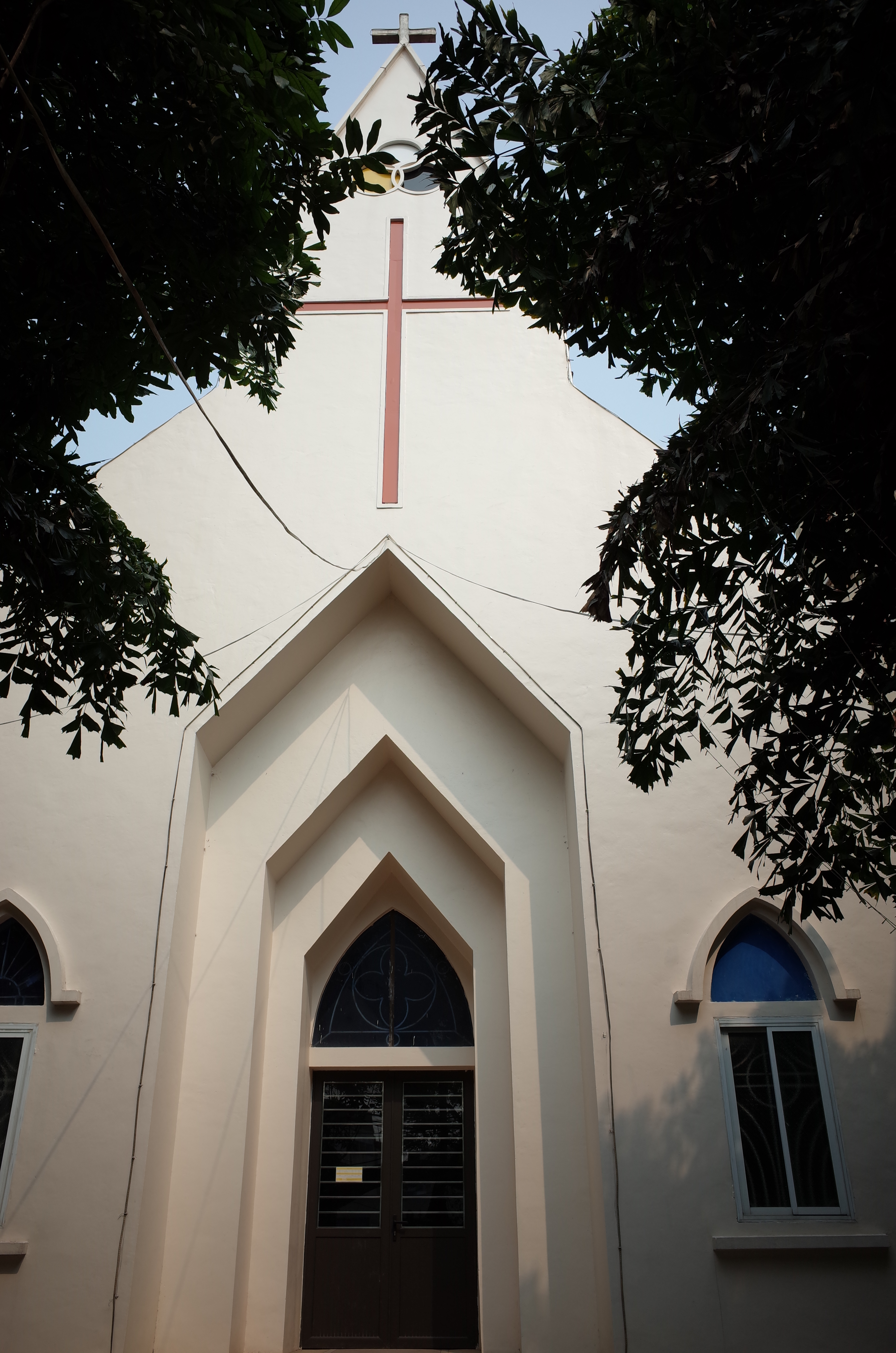
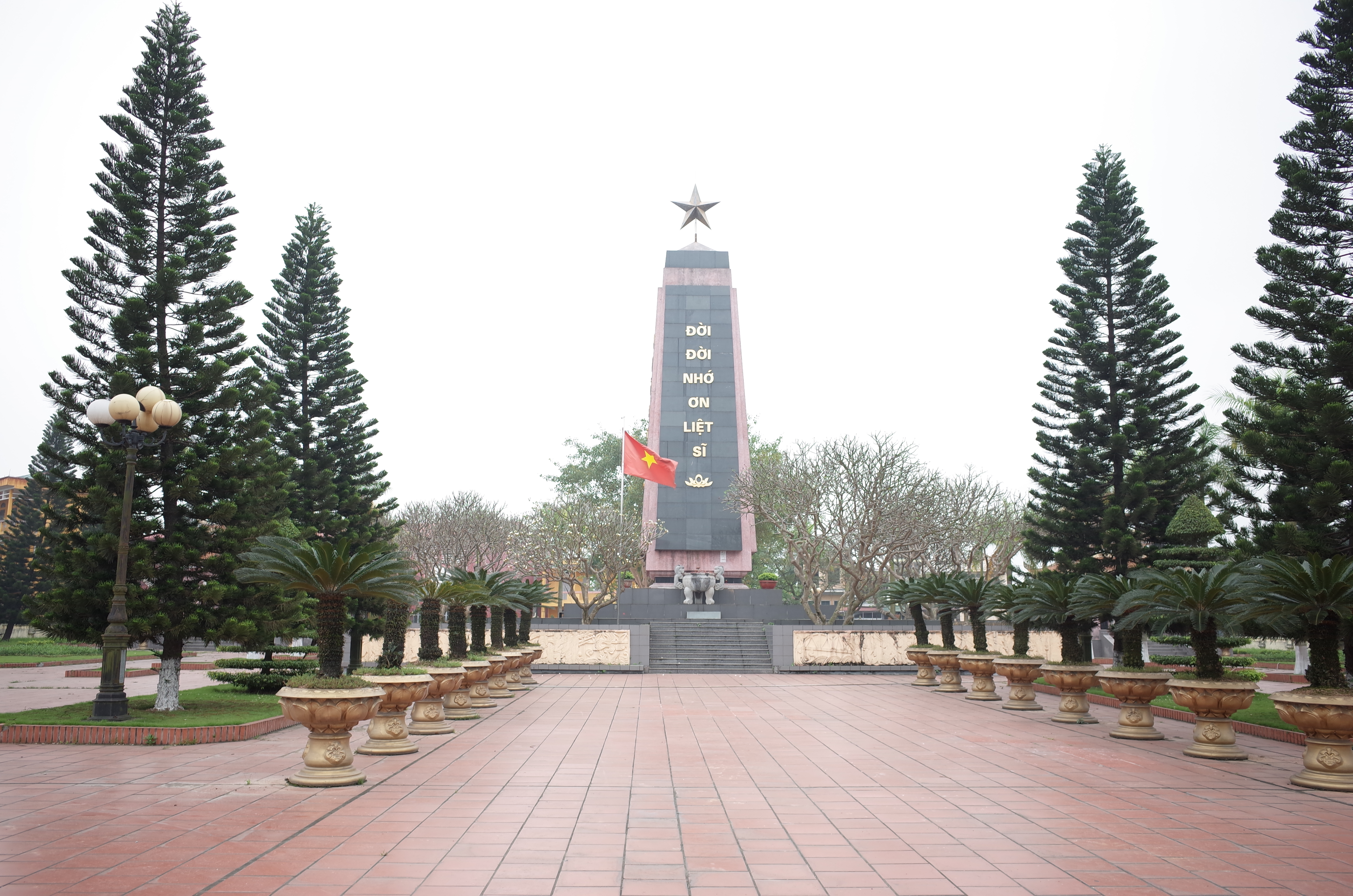
- From top to bottom, from left to right: Bạch Đằng Park, Nghè Nhội, old town, Protestant church, martyrs cemetery

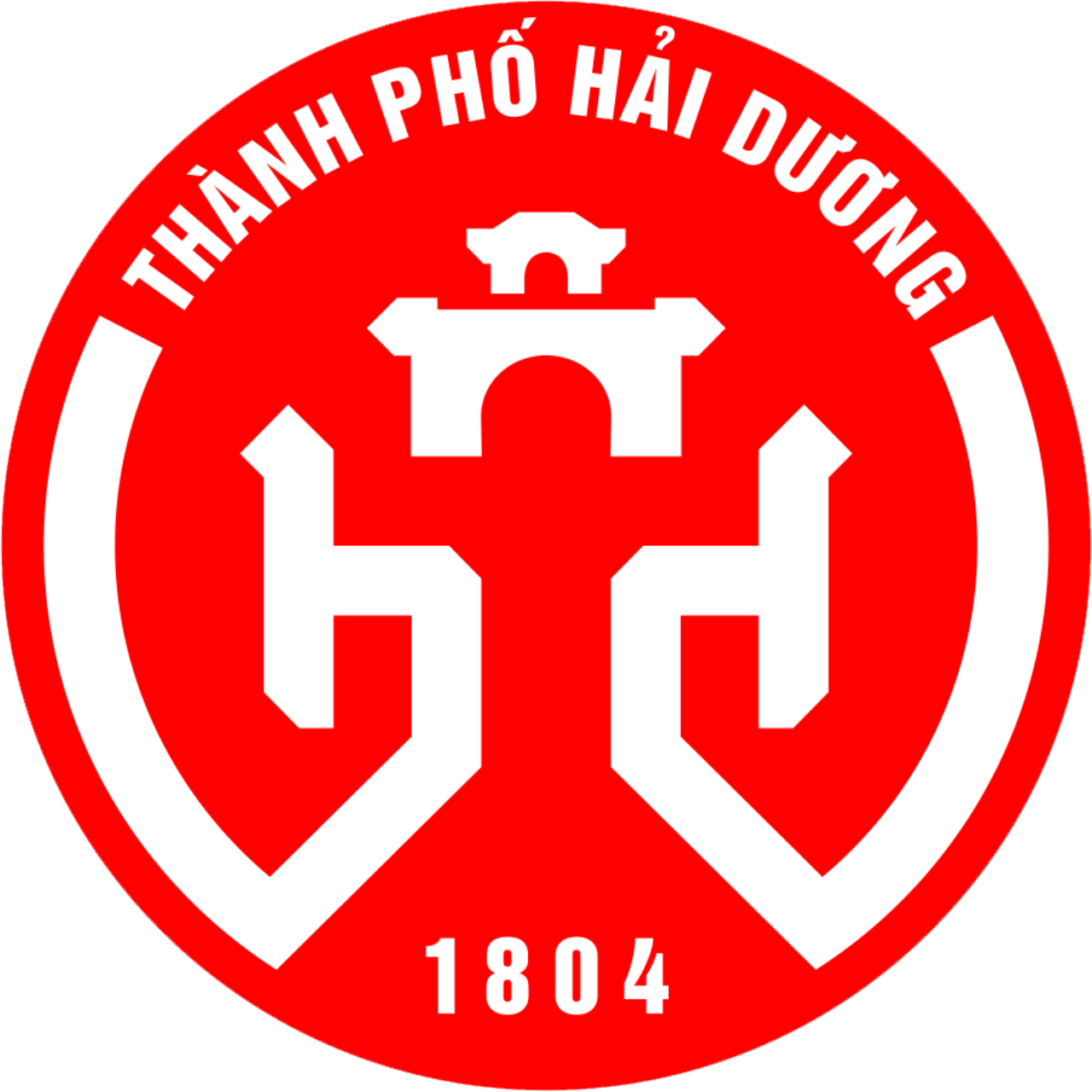
- Seal
- Interactive map of Hải Dương
- Location in Vietnam
- Coordinates: 20°56′23″N 106°19′50″E
- Country: Vietnam

Area
  - Provincial city (Class-1): 71.38 km^{2} (27.56 sq mi)

Population (2019 census)
  - Provincial city (Class-1): 241,373
  - Density: 3,382/km^{2} (8,758/sq mi)
  - Urban: 215,593
- Climate: Cwa

Hải Dương was a former provincial city in Vietnam. It was the capital of Hải Dương, an industrialized province in the Hanoi metropolitan area and the Red River Delta in Northern Vietnam, now merged into Haiphong. The city is at the midpoint between the capital Hanoi and the major port Haiphong, and is part of the Northern Key Economic Zone. In 2019, Hai Duong city had a population of 241,373.

== Name ==
The name first appeared officially in 1498. In feudal times, Hải Dương indicated a vast area from east of Hanoi to the sea of Hai Phong nowadays. This area corresponds to all of modern Hải Dương, Haiphong, most of Hưng Yên and the southwestern corner of Quảng Ninh. Hải Dương city is in the middle of this historical area and was the location of a citadel defending the capital. Because of this historical location, Thành Đông (eastern citadel) is a common nickname of Hải Dương. The name "Hải Dương" (海陽) comes from Sino-Vietnamese and means "ocean sun" in English.

== Geography ==
Hải Dương city is bordered to the north-east by Nam Sách and Thanh Hà districts, to the west by Cẩm Giàng District, and to the south by Gia Lộc and Tứ Kỳ districts, and also a branch of the Sat River. A branch of the Cái River (literally, "mother river" in Vietnamese) divides the city into two parts, on one side the urban area, and on the other side rural and industrial outskirts. The city is located in the centre of both the Northern Economic Area and of the Hanoi–Haiphong–Quảng Ninh development region as well. Hải Dương is located 58 kilometres (36 mi) from Hanoi, 45 kilometres (28 mi) from Haiphong, and 80 kilometres (50 mi) from Halong Bay. A railway, National Highway No.5 (Hanoi - Hải Dương - Haiphong) and National Highway No.18 (Bắc Ninh - Hải Dương - Quảng Ninh) all pass through the province. Hải Dương Province is also located within the Red River Delta of northern Vietnam. It is bordered by Haiphong and Quảng Ninh provinces in the east, Hưng Yên in the west, Bắc Ninh and Bắc Giang in the north, and Thái Bình in the south. With a total area of 1,648 km^{2} (636 mi^{2}), Hải Dương Province has one major city (Hải Dương) and eleven districts (Bình Giang, Cẩm Giàng, Chí Linh, Gia Lộc, Kim Thành, Kinh Môn, Nam Sách, Ninh Giang, Thanh Hà, Thanh Miện and Tứ Kỳ).

Nowadays, highways make it easier to commute between Haiphong, Hải Dương and Hanoi. As of October 2017 it takes between 45 minutes and one hour to travel from Hải Dương to Hanoi.

== Administrative divisions ==
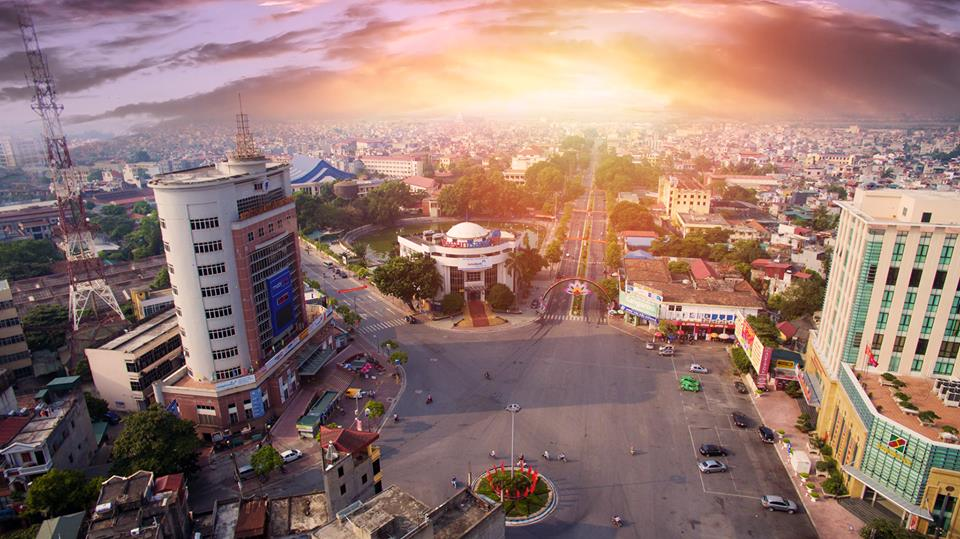
The downtown area of Hai Duong city seen from above

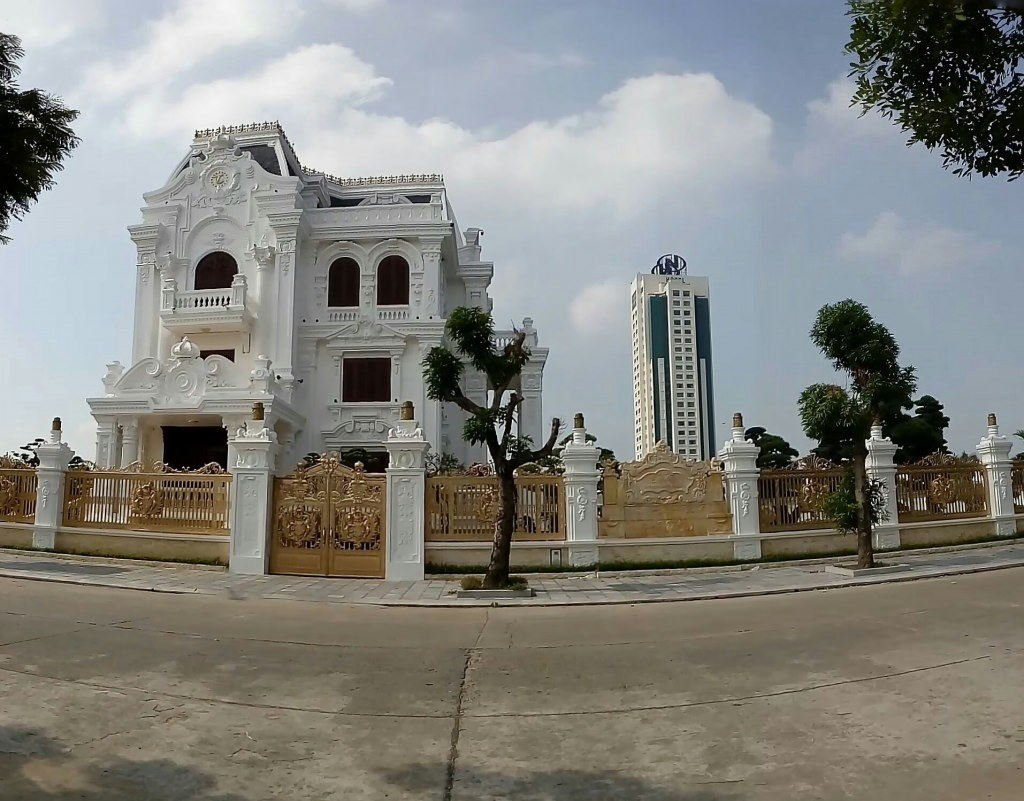
Urban Area West of Hai Duong City. As the first urban area built in Hai Duong city, in 2004. Area of 595ha, including: townhouses, luxury villas, eco-tourism area, residential area. entertainment

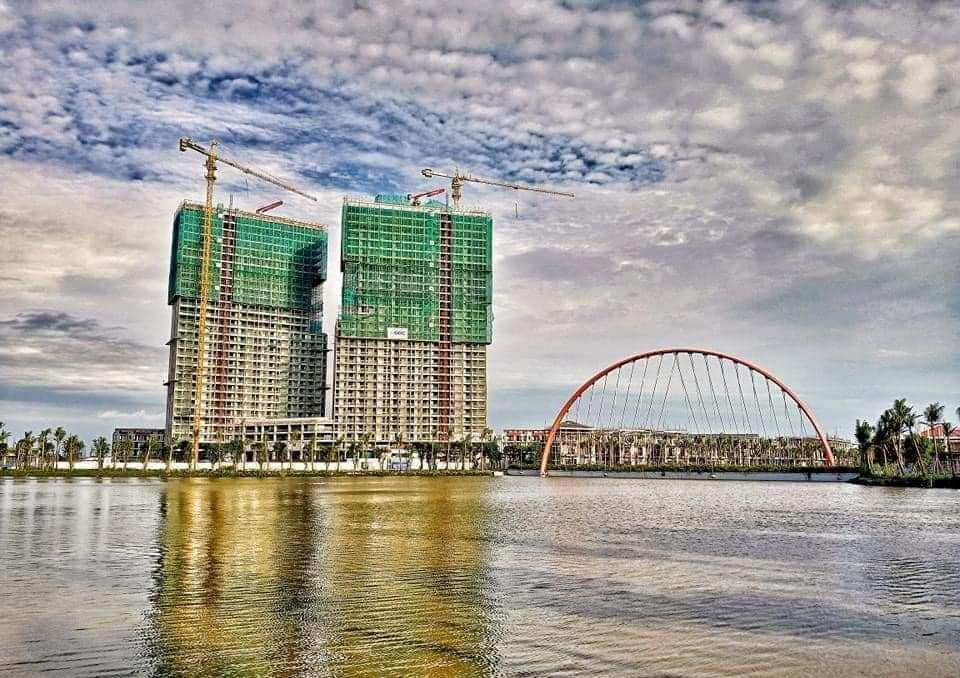
Ecorivers Hai Duong urban area - Asia's best urban area award 2020. Scale: 109.2ha. Estimated population: 16,800 people. Total investment: up to US$1 billion. More than 20ha of green trees on the water surface. Real estate products: including villas, townhouses, townhouses, townhouses, luxury apartments.

Hải Dương city was built in 1804, and was first called "Thành Đông" (Sino-Vietnamese for eastern citadel), referring to the citadel east of Vietnam's capital, Hanoi. During the French colonial period, Hải Dương was a town. Before 1968, Hải Dương was a town in Hải Dương Province. Between 1968 and 1996 it was the capital of Hải Hưng Province after the provinces of Hải Dương and Hưng Yên merged to form Hải Hưng. On November 6, 1996, following the separation of Hải Dương and Hưng Yên provinces, Hải Dương became the capital of Hải Dương province. On August 6, 1997, Hải Dương was established as a city.

From 2019, Hải Dương city contains 20 wards (urban) and 7 communes (rural).

=== Wards ===
- Ái Quốc
- Bình Hàn
- Cẩm Thượng
- Hải Tân
- Lê Thanh Nghị
- Nam Đồng
- Ngọc Châu
- Nguyễn Trãi
- Nhị Châu
- Phạm Ngũ Lão
- Quang Trung
- Tân Bình
- Tân Hưng
- Thạch Khôi
- Thanh Bình
- Trần Hưng Đạo
- Trần Phú
- Tứ Minh
- Việt Hòa

=== Communes ===
- An Châu
- Gia Xuyên
- Liên Hồng
- Ngọc Sơn
- Quyết Thắng
- Tiền Tiến
- Thượng Đạt

== Administrative Reorganization ==
In April 2025, the Central Committee of the Communist Party of Vietnam adopted Resolution No. 60-NQ/TW at its 11th Plenum of the 13th tenure, approving the merger of Hai Duong province and Hai Phong city into a single administrative unit.

Following this, the Standing Committee of the National Assembly issued Resolution No. 1669/NQ-UBTVQH15, which provided detailed arrangements for the consolidation of commune- and ward-level administrative units in Hai Duong and Hai Phong.

On 1 December 2025, Hai Duong City was officially reorganized with 28 newly consolidated communes, wards, and townships commencing operations. The handover of seals and personnel appointments took place at the Hai Duong Provincial Public Administration Service Center. The reorganization was intended to streamline the administrative apparatus, improve governance efficiency, and support socio-economic development in the region.

== Climate ==
Climate data for Hải Dương
Month	Jan	Feb	Mar	Apr	May	Jun	Jul	Aug	Sep	Oct	Nov	Dec	Year
Record high °C (°F)	30.5 (86.9)	31.6 (88.9)	33.2 (91.8)	38.5 (101.3)	38.6 (101.5)	40.2 (104.4)	38.3 (100.9)	38.8 (101.8)	37.2 (99.0)	35.5 (95.9)	33.1 (91.6)	30.0 (86.0)	40.2 (104.4)
Mean daily maximum °C (°F)	19.5 (67.1)	20.1 (68.2)	22.5 (72.5)	26.6 (79.9)	30.8 (87.4)	32.6 (90.7)	32.6 (90.7)	31.8 (89.2)	30.9 (87.6)	28.9 (84.0)	25.6 (78.1)	21.9 (71.4)	27.0 (80.6)
Daily mean °C (°F)	16.3 (61.3)	17.4 (63.3)	20.0 (68.0)	23.7 (74.7)	27.1 (80.8)	29.0 (84.2)	29.2 (84.6)	28.5 (83.3)	27.3 (81.1)	24.9 (76.8)	21.4 (70.5)	17.9 (64.2)	23.6 (74.5)
Mean daily minimum °C (°F)	14.0 (57.2)	15.6 (60.1)	18.2 (64.8)	21.7 (71.1)	24.6 (76.3)	26.3 (79.3)	26.6 (79.9)	26.0 (78.8)	24.9 (76.8)	22.1 (71.8)	18.5 (65.3)	14.9 (58.8)	21.1 (70.0)
Record low °C (°F)	4.1 (39.4)	5.0 (41.0)	6.5 (43.7)	11.9 (53.4)	16.6 (61.9)	18.9 (66.0)	21.5 (70.7)	21.8 (71.2)	16.5 (61.7)	13.0 (55.4)	8.1 (46.6)	3.2 (37.8)	3.2 (37.8)
Average rainfall mm (inches)	25.8 (1.02)	22.4 (0.88)	45.4 (1.79)	85.5 (3.37)	172.9 (6.81)	232.3 (9.15)	241.1 (9.49)	292.7 (11.52)	209.3 (8.24)	129.1 (5.08)	55.9 (2.20)	20.0 (0.79)	1,534.4 (60.41)
Average rainy days	8.1	11.4	15.7	12.9	13.3	14.5	14.3	16.4	13.0	9.6	6.4	5.2	140.7
Average relative humidity (%)	82.4	85.4	88.2	88.7	85.9	83.5	83.6	86.6	85.6	82.4	80.2	79.5	84.3
Mean monthly sunshine hours	72.5	45.1	39.5	83.1	183.8	171.8	191.4	172.8	178.6	168.0	143.6	119.0	1,566.6
Source: Vietnam Institute for Building Science and Technology, Nchmf.gov.vn (August record high)

== Transport ==
=== Road ===
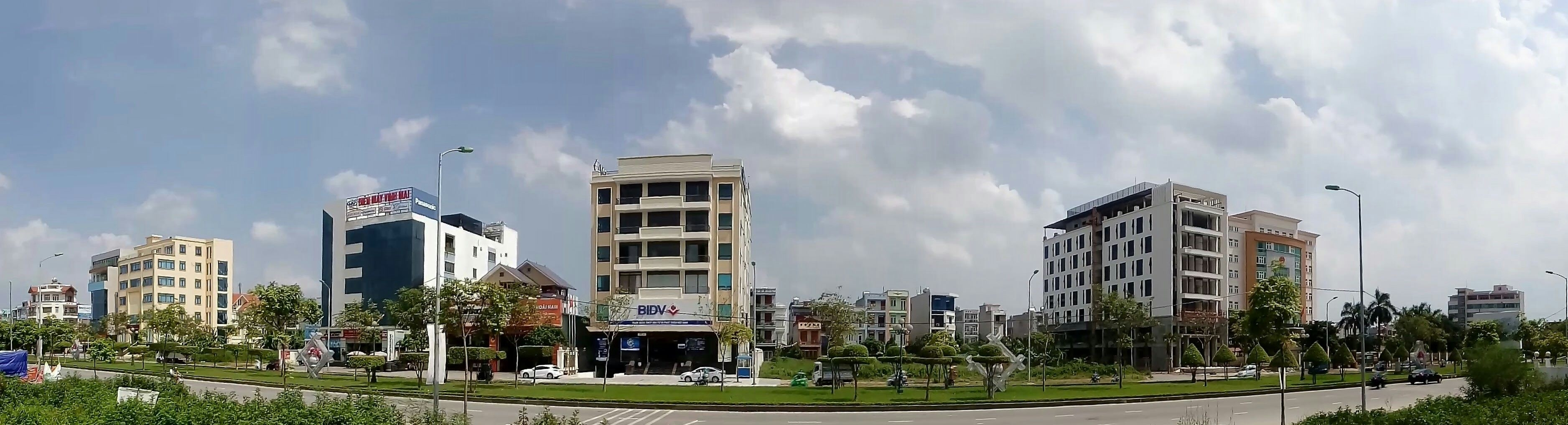
Truong Chinh Street, Hai Duong City, with a total length of 3.4km, a cross section of 52 meters, is an important route connecting the western urban area, the southern urban area, the Hanoi–Haiphong Expressway with Hai Duong city center.

- National highway routes: 5, 191, 37, 17
- Main street:

Avenue: Ho Chi Minh, Tran Hung Dao, Nguyen Luong Bang, Le Thanh Nghi, Vo Nguyen Giap (formerly October 30).
Streets: Pham Ngu Lao, Truong Chinh, Thanh Nien, Thong Nhat, Ngo Quyen, Hong Quang, Yet Kieu, Dien Bien Phu, Bach Dang, Hoang Dieu, Nguyen Thuong Man, Chi Lang, Cuu Thanh, Hao Thanh, Hoang Hoa Tham, Bach Nang Thi, Bui Thi Xuan, An Thai, Pham Ngu Lao, Chuong Duong, Tam Giang, Quang Trung, Doan Ket, Cam Thuong, Ba Trieu, Do Ngoc Du, Nguyen Trac Luan, Phu Tho, Nguyen Quy Tan, Nguyen Thi Due, Dong Nien, Dancer Dan, Vu Huu, Duc Minh,...

=== Waterway ===
Hai Duong city has a quite convenient waterway transportation system. From Hai Duong city, according to the Thai Binh river system, boats can go down to Hai Phong Port, or back to the northern midland mountainous provinces.

Cong Cau Port is an inland waterway port with the function of loading and unloading goods - mainly raw materials - to and from other provinces and cities, the port has a capacity of 300,000 tons/year and a system of wharves and yards to meet the needs of domestic and foreign tourists. Transport goods by water in a convenient way.

=== Railway ===
The Hanoi-Hai Phong railway passes through Hai Duong city about 13 km, starting from Viet Hoa ward and ending at Ai Quoc ward. Connecting with other provinces at Hai Duong Station- the railway hub of the whole province, and Tien Trung is the transit station of the Northeast region of the province.

== Business environment ==
On Vietnam's Provincial Competitiveness Index 2023, a key tool for evaluating the business environment in Vietnam's provinces, Hai Duong received a score of 68.68. This was an improvement from 2022 in which the province received a score of 65.22. In 2023, the province received its highest scores on the ‘Entry Costs' and 'Law and Order' criterion and lowest scores on 'Transparency' and 'Business Support Policy'.

== Gallery ==
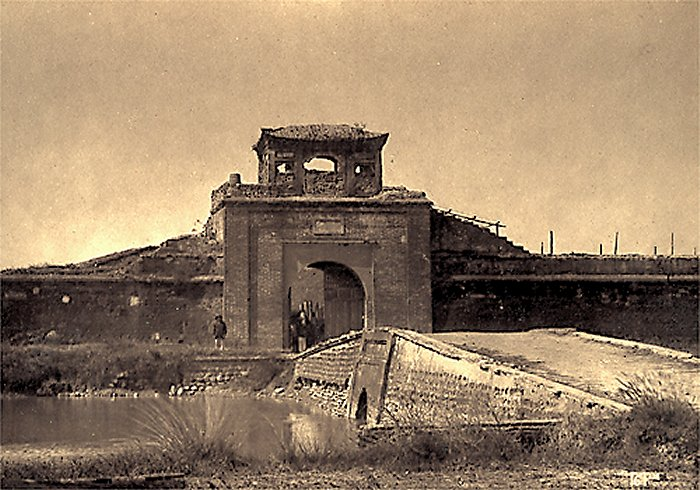
Hai Duong Citadel after bombarded by French artillery around 1883

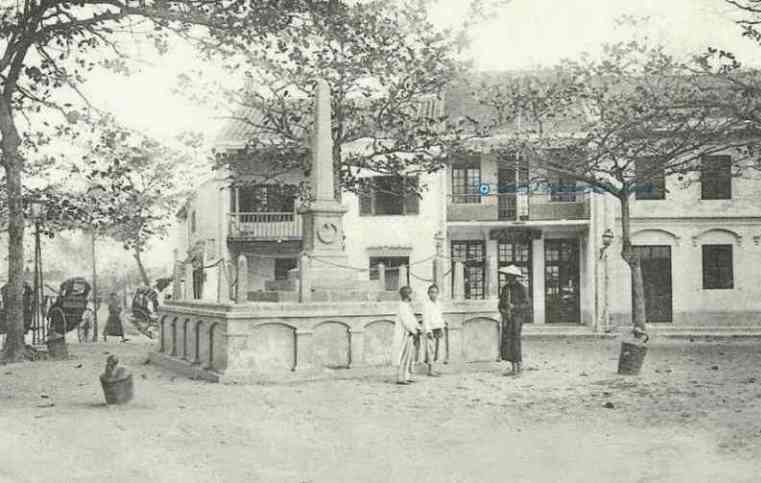
Hai Duong city around 1900

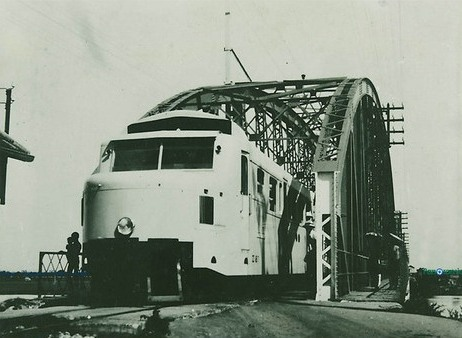
Phú Lương Bridge 1921 - 1935

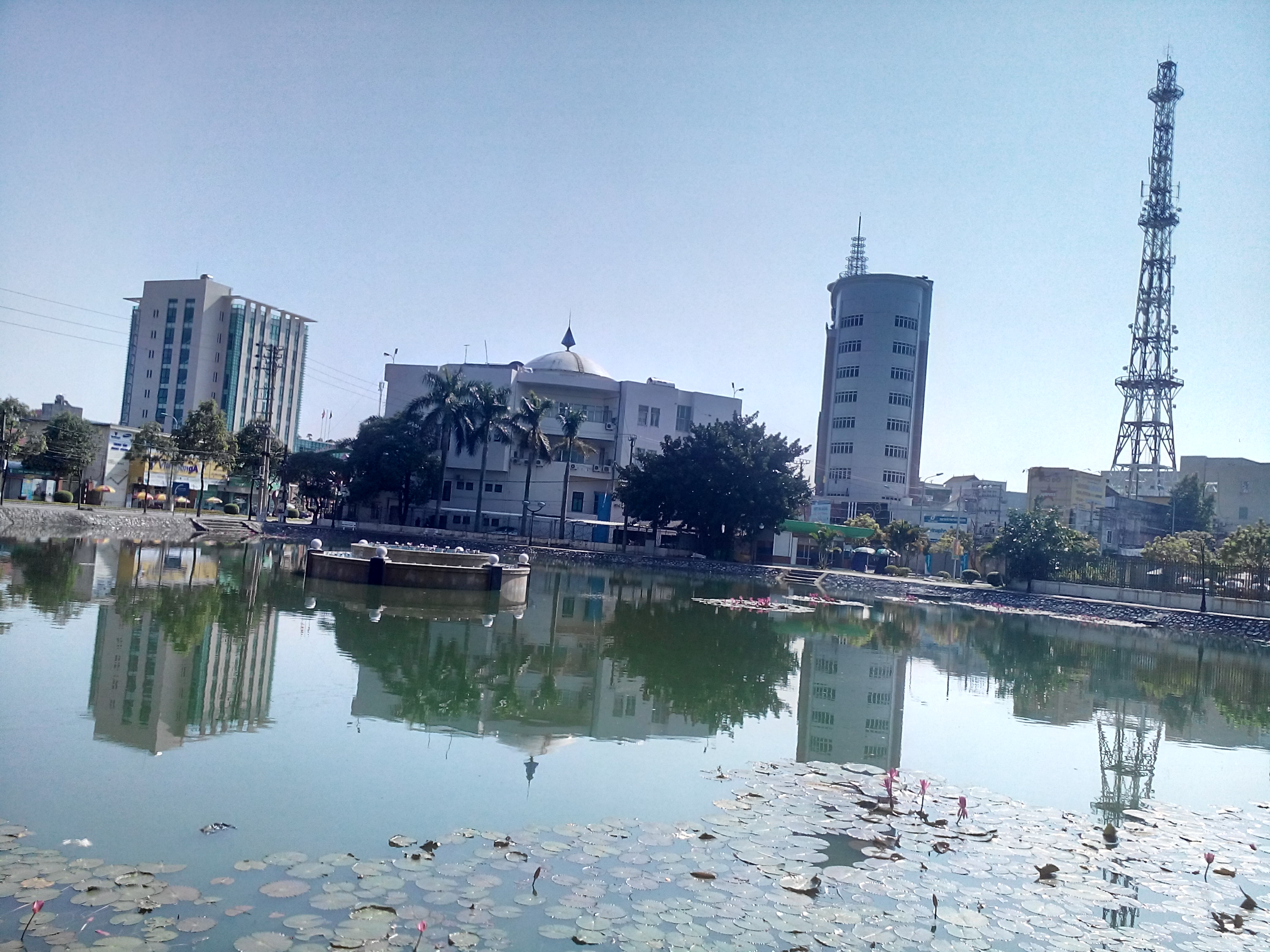
The area of the old town of Hai Duong city

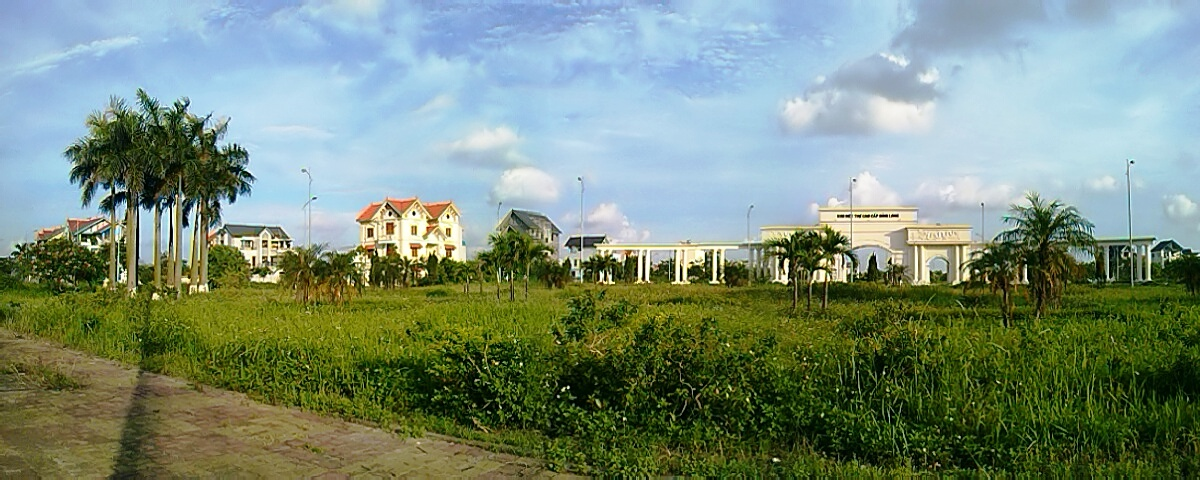
Dinh Long urban area, Truong Chinh street, Hai Duong city

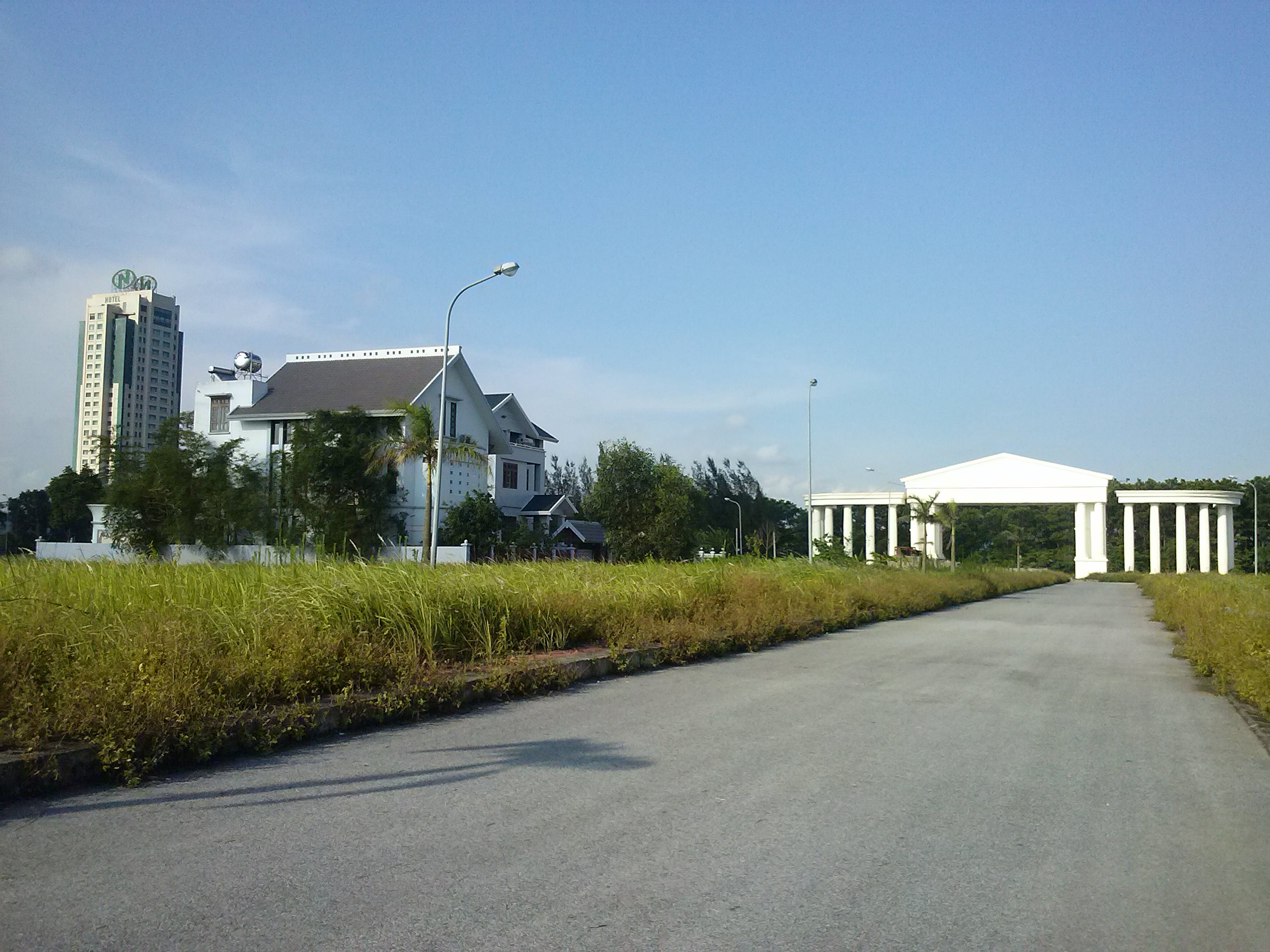
Haiduongplaza luxury villa area, Tan Trao street, Hai Duong city

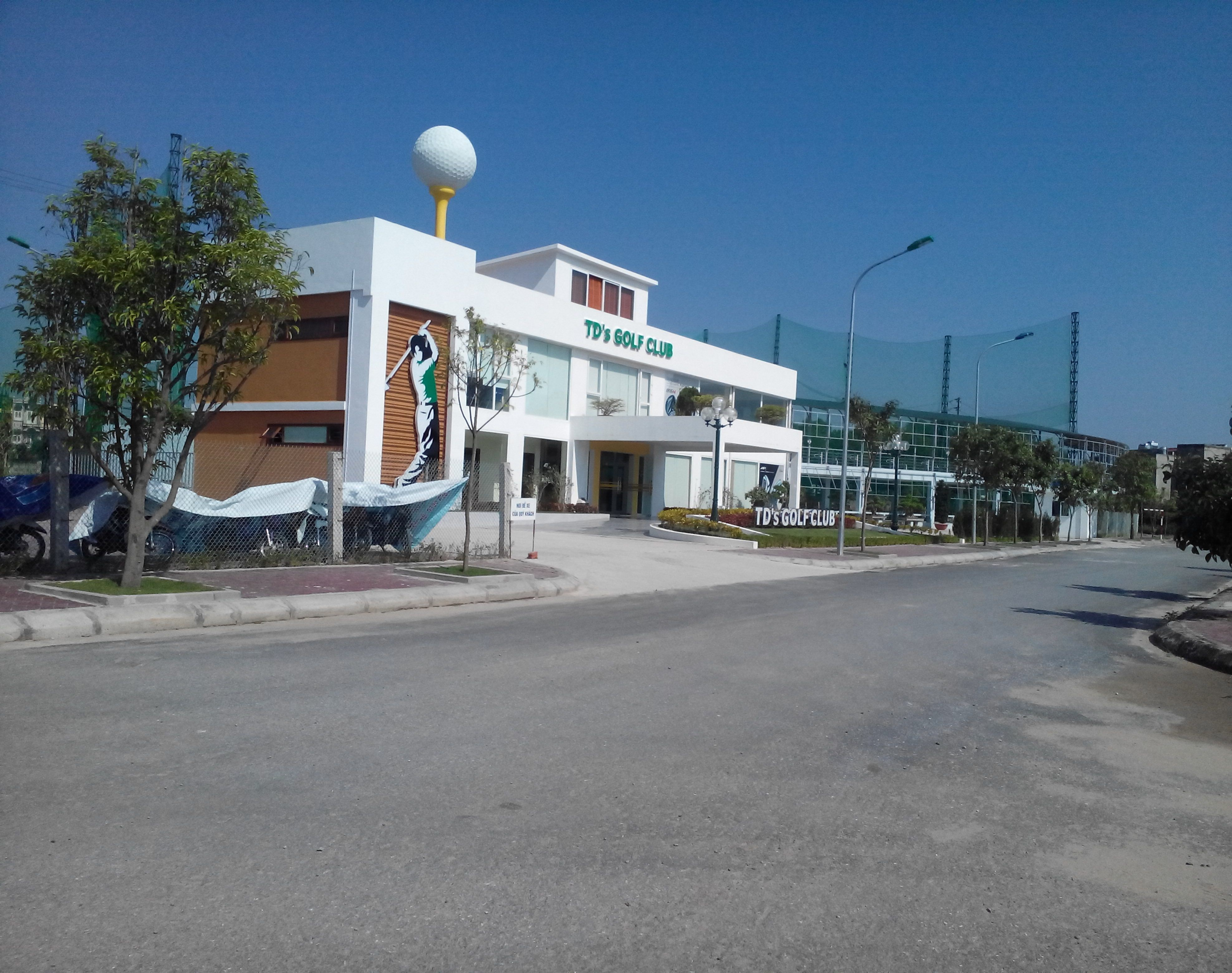
Thanh Dong Golf Course, Ngo Quyen street, Hai Duong city

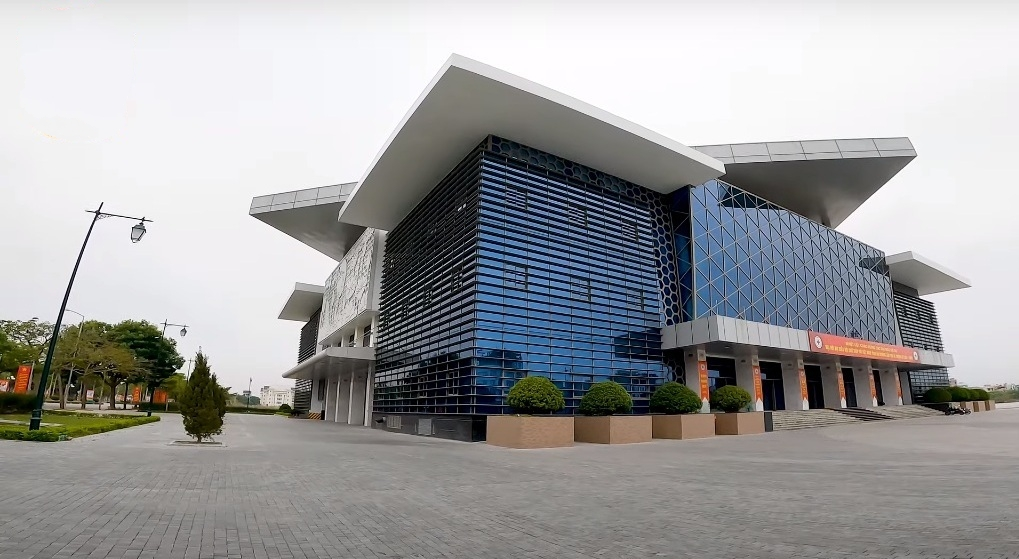
Hai Duong Cultural Centre, Thanh Nien street, Hai Duong city

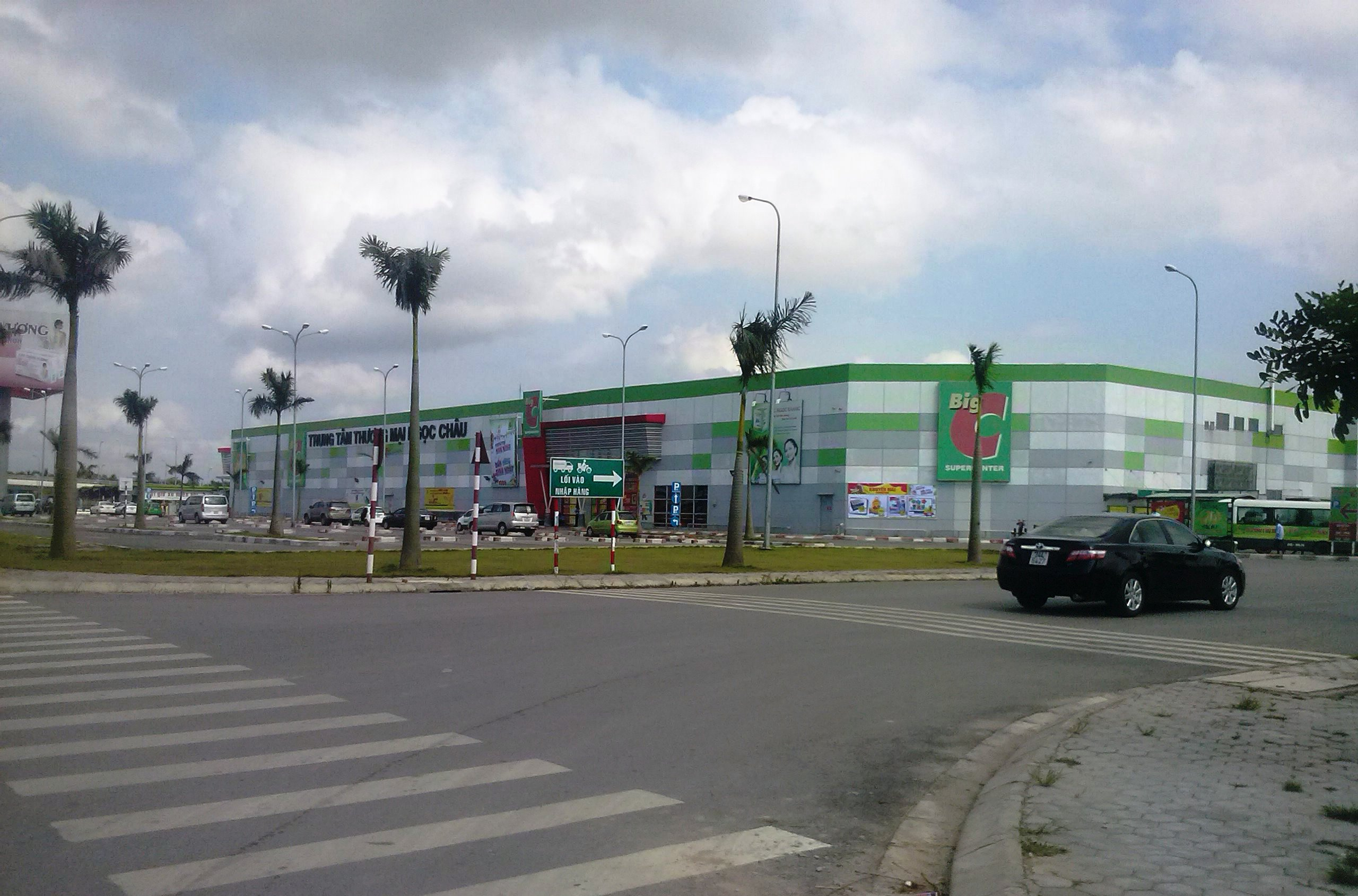
Big C Supermarket in Hai Duong city

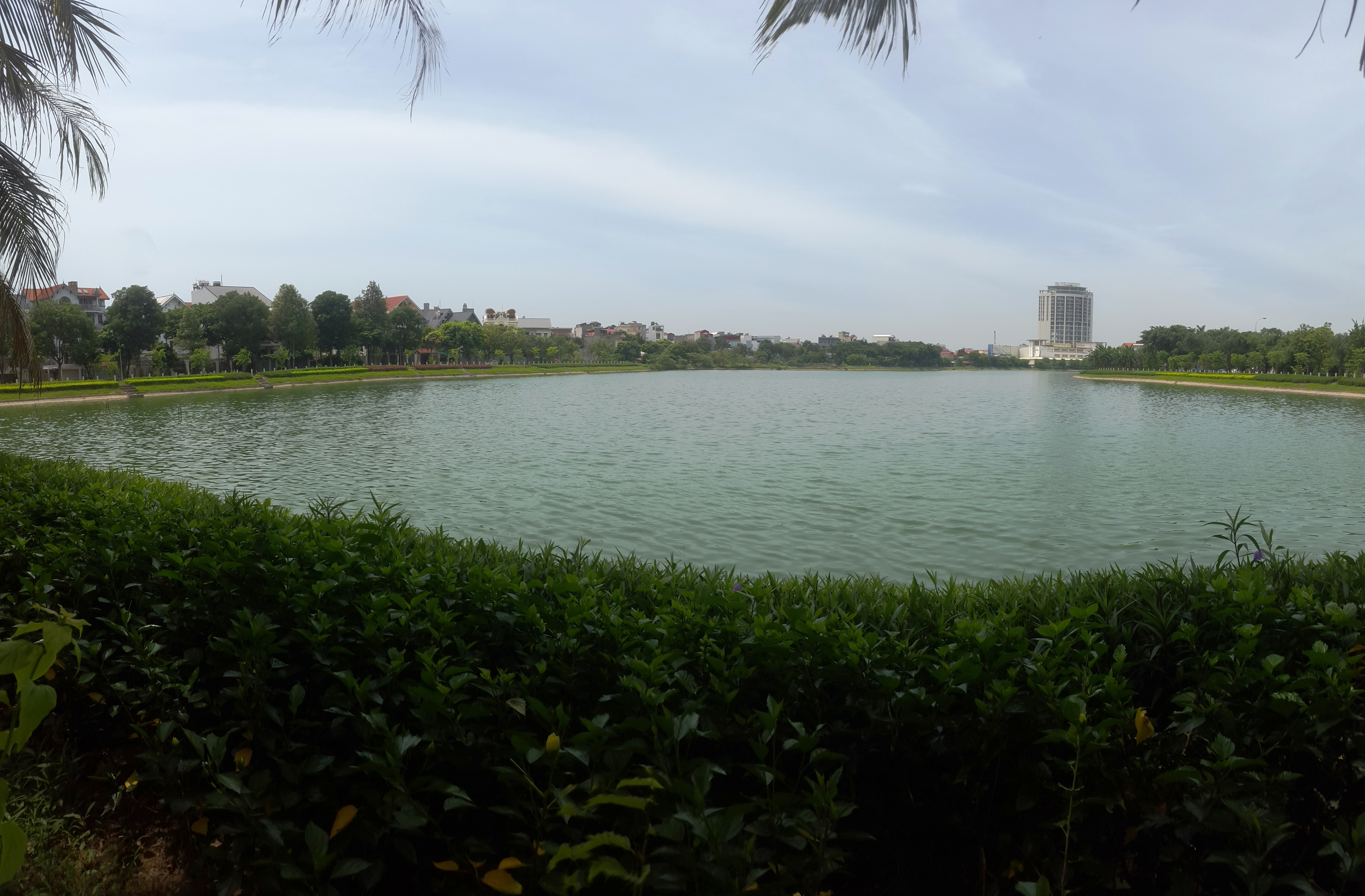
Ha Hai ecological urban area, Hai Dong street, Hai Duong city

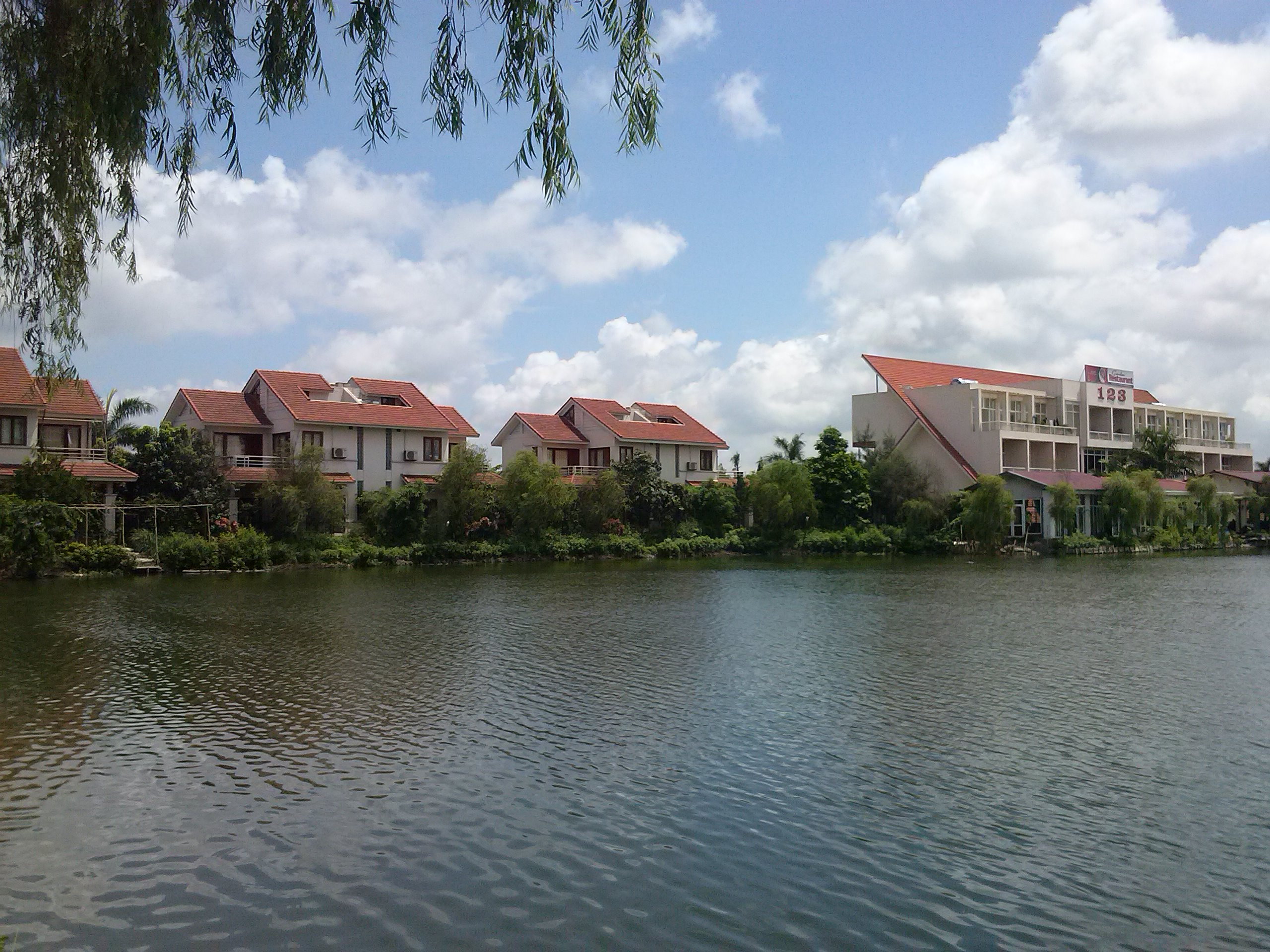
Trai Bau Lake, Ha Hai ecological urban area, Hai Dong street, Hai Duong city

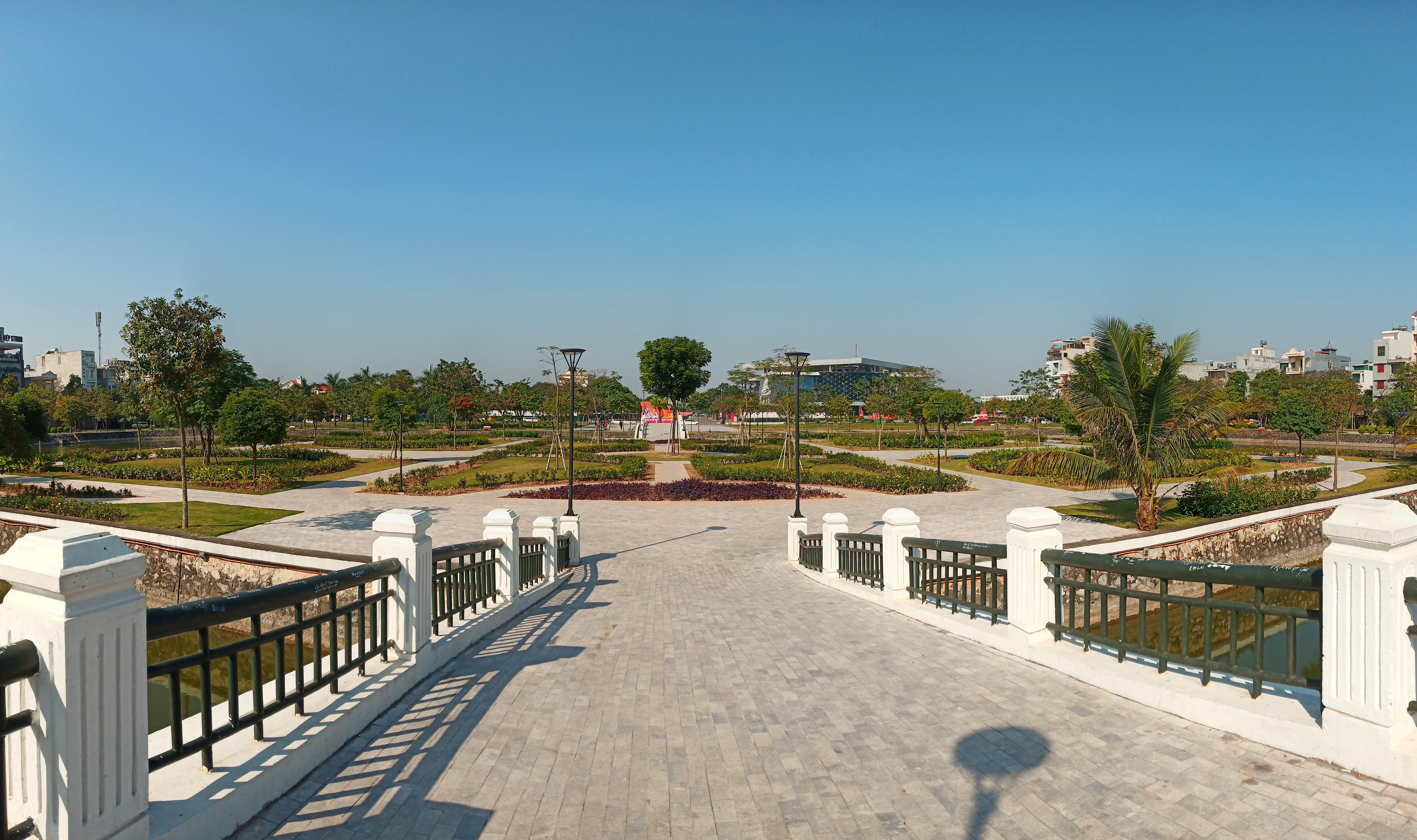
Flower garden, trees, lake in the Eastern urban area of Hai Duong city

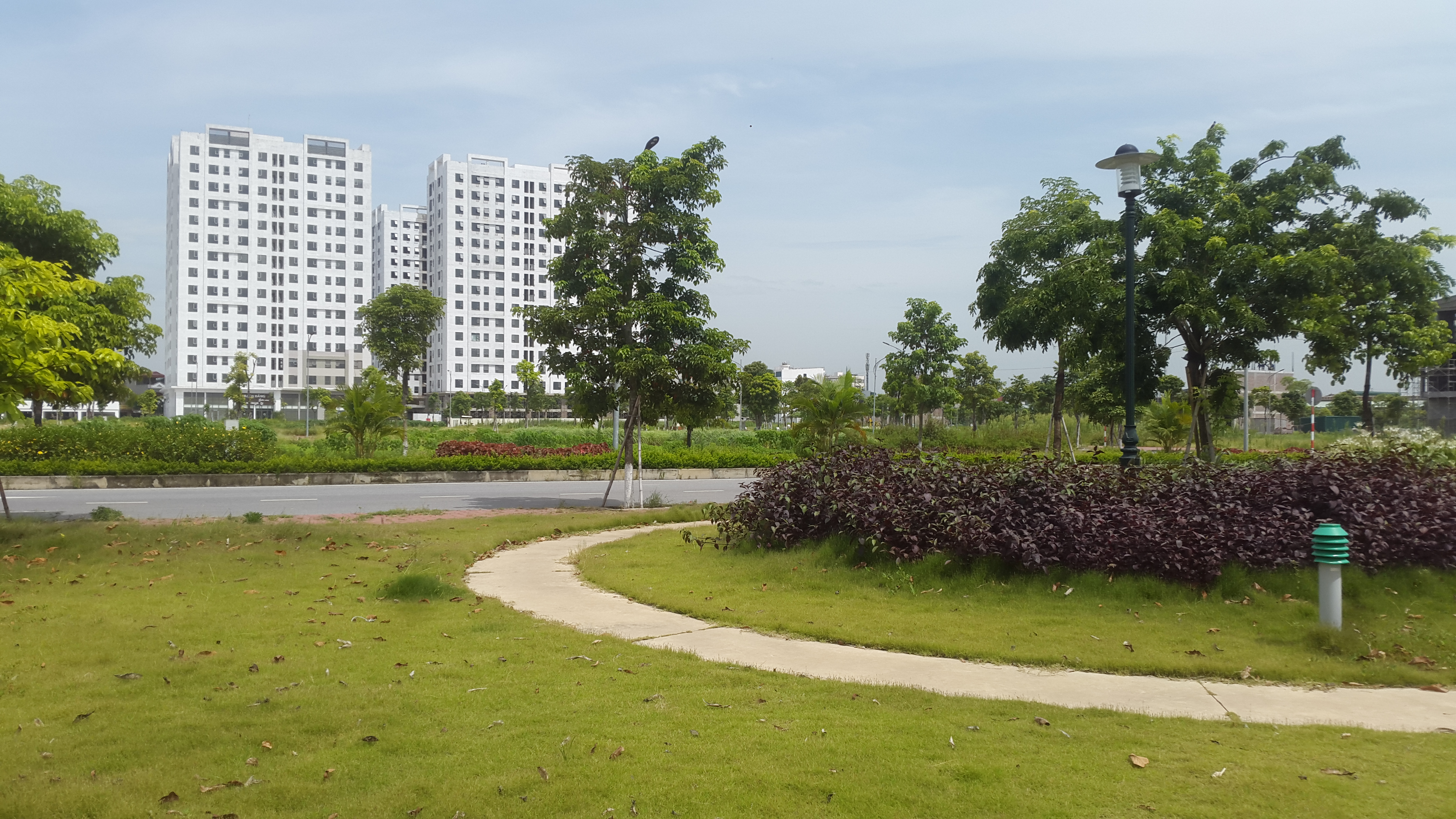
Bach Dang Lake view urban area, Hai Duong city
