= Văn Yên district, Hải Hưng =

Former district of Hải Hưng Province, Vietnam

Văn Yên District is former district of Hải Hưng Province. It was formed on March 11, 1977, from merger of Văn Giang and Yên Mỹ districts. It was merged on February 2, 1979, with Văn Mỹ district to form Mỹ Văn district.
