= Cẩm Bình (disambiguation) =

Cẩm Bình may refer to several places in Vietnam, including:

- Cẩm Bình, a commune of Hà Tĩnh province
- Cẩm Bình, Quảng Ninh, a former ward of Cẩm Phả
- Cẩm Bình, Thanh Hóa, a former rural commune of Cẩm Thủy District
- Former Cẩm Bình District of Hải Hưng Province
