= Tứ Lộc district =

Former district in Vietnam

Tứ Lộc district is a former district of Hải Hưng province in South Vietnam. It was formed on February 24, 1979, from the merger of the Tứ Kỳ and Gia Lộc districts.
