= Ninh Thanh district =

Former district in Vietnam

Ninh Than is former district of Hải Hưng province. It was formed in February 1979 from merger of Thanh Miện and Ninh Giang districts.
