= Kim Môn district =

Former district in Vietnam

Kim Môn is former district of Hải Hưng province. It was formed in 1979 from Kim Thành and Kinh Môn districts.
