= Nam Thanh =

Nam Thanh may refer to several places in Vietnam, including:

- Nam Thanh, a ward of Điện Biên Phủ
- Nam Thanh, Nam Định, a commune of Nam Trực District
- Nam Thanh, Nghệ An, a commune of Nam Đàn District
- Nam Thanh, Thái Bình, a commune of Tiền Hải District
- Former Nam Thanh District of Hải Hưng Province

== See also ==
- Nam Thành, Ninh Bình, a ward of Ninh Bình City
- Nam Thành, Nghệ An, a commune of Yên Thành District
