= Nam Thanh district =

Former district in Vietnam

Nam Thanh is a former district of Hải Hưng province. It was formed on February 24, 1979, from the merger of Nam Sách and Thanh Hà districts.
