= Văn Mỹ district =

Former district in Vietnam

Văn Mỹ is former district of Hải Hưng province. It was formed from Văn Lâm and Mỹ Hào districts. It was merged on February 24, 1979, with Văn Yên to form Mỹ Văn district.
