= Cẩm Bình district =

Former district in Vietnam

Cẩm Bình is former district of Hải Hưng province. It was formed in January 1977 from merger of Cẩm Giàng and Bình Giang districts.
