= Như Quỳnh (disambiguation) =

Như Quỳnh (born 1970) is an American-Vietnamese singer.

Như Quỳnh may also refer to:

- Như Quỳnh, a town in Văn Lâm District, Hưng Yên province, Vietnam
- Như Quỳnh (actress) (born 1954)
