= Dong Xa =

Dong Xa may refer to

- Đồng Xá, a village in Bắc Kạn Province, in Vietnam
- Dong Xa, a village in Binh Giang District of Hải Dương province, Vietnam - site of 2009 Jimmy Carter Habitat for Humanity work project
