= Nam Sách district =

Coordinates: 21.000°N 106.333°E

Nam Sách District Huyện Nam Sách
- District
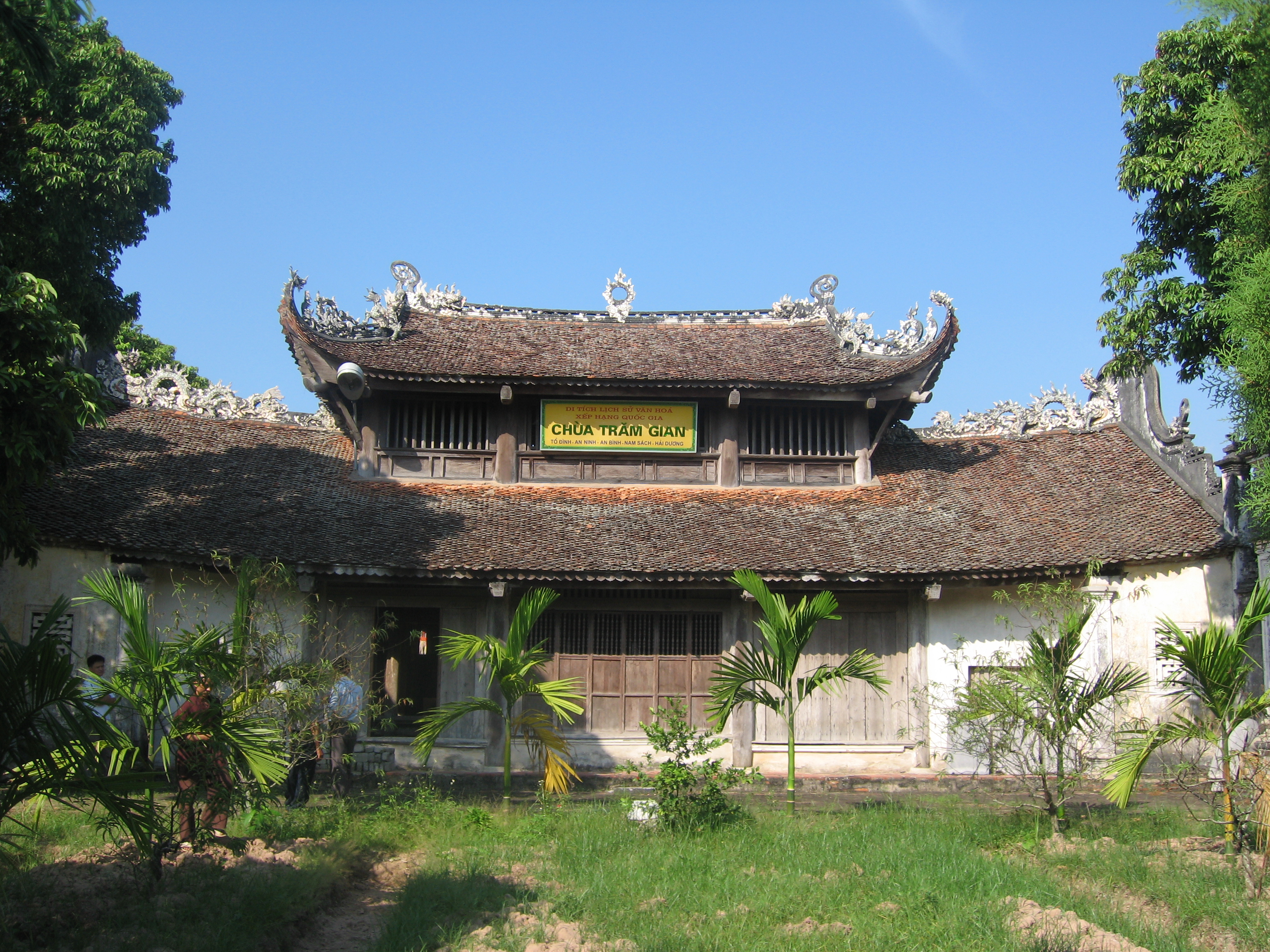
- Hundred Gian Pagoda in An Đông village, An Bình commune, Nam Sách district
- Country: Vietnam
- Region: Red River Delta
- Province: Hải Dương
- Capital: Nam Sách

Area
  - Total: 51 sq mi (133 km^{2})

Population (2003)
  - Total: 139,184
- Time zone: UTC+07:00 (Indochina Time)

Nam Sách is a rural district of Hải Dương province in the Red River Delta region of Vietnam. As of 2003 the district had a population of 139,184. The district covers an area of 133 km^{2}. The district capital lies at Nam Sách.

== History ==
The area Nam Sách (南策) is the source of many pottery artifacts. In 1592, when what is today Hải Dương province was under Mạc dynasty control, Nam Sách along with Kim Thành, Thanh Hà, and Kinh Môn districts were the target of attack by 300 fighting boats of the Lê dynasty.

== Notable people ==
- Pháp Loa, disciple of Trần Nhân Tông
- vi:Phạm Tuấn Tài (1905-1937) a teacher and revolutionary
