= Ninh Giang =

Ninh Giang may refer to several places in Vietnam:

- Ninh Giang District, a rural district of Hải Dương Province
- Ninh Giang, Khánh Hòa, a ward of Ninh Hòa town
- Ninh Giang, Hải Dương, a township and capital of Ninh Giang District
- Ninh Giang, Ninh Bình, a rural commune of Hoa Lư
