= Ngọc Châu =

Ngọc Châu may refer to several places in Vietnam, including:

- Ngọc Châu, Hải Dương, a ward of Hải Dương
- Ngọc Châu, Bắc Giang, a commune of Tân Yên District
