= Châu Giang district =

Former district of Hải Hưng, Vietnam

Châu Giang is former district of Hải Hưng province. It was formed on February 24, 1979, from merger of Khoái Châu district and 14 communes of Văn Giang district.
