= Mạc Thị Bưởi =

Mạc Thị Bưởi (1927–1951) was one of the people rewarded the title of Hero of the Vietnamese People's Armed Forces in the first time in 1955 by the Government of the Democratic Republic of Vietnam. She was born in 1927 in Nam Tân Commune, Nam Sách District, Hải Dương Province.

== Historical operation ==
In the August Revolution, she joined the local organization named Phụ nữ cứu quốc'. After France recaptured Indochina, she began to join the guerrilla force.

In 1949, the French army conducted many operations and controlled a large area of Nam Tân commune. Therefore, the Viet Minh in Nam Tan Commune was turned into the surrounding area. Only Mạc Thị Bưởi continued to stay, organized activities for the Viet Minh in difficult conditions. Moreover, she also organized three groups of guerrilla women, built 35 facilities in three villages of the commune; Mobilizing the public against paying taxes, joining the French troops.

In 1950, Viet Minh troops attacked Thanh Dung. In this battle, Mạc Thị Bưởi carried out the reconnaissance to make the advantage for the battle. The French Army repeatedly offered prizes to capture Mạc Thị Bưởi, but all attempts failed.

In 1951, she was in charge of mobilizing people to temporarily occupy rice, sugar and milk and move to the free area to serve Trần Hưng Đạo Campaign. She was arrested and killed on April 23, 1951, when she was only 24 years old.

== Honours ==
On August 31, 1955, Mac Thi Buoi was posthumously awarded the title of Hero of the People's Armed Forces and Order of the Second Class Military Medal by the President of the Democratic Republic of Vietnam. She was commemorated in a set of stamps in 1956.
