= Kim Thi district =

Former district in Vietnam

Kim Thi is former district of Hải Hưng province. It was formed from merger of Kim Động and Ân Thi districts.
