= Mỹ Văn district =

Former district of Hải Hưng Province, Vietnam

Mỹ Văn is former district of Hải Hưng province in South Vietnam. It was formed on February 24, 1979 from merger of former Văn Yên and Văn Mỹ districts.
