= Kim Thành =

- Commune
- Đồng Xá Parish Church
- Interactive map of Kim Thành
- Coordinates: 20.895781352147868°N 106.51709147541561°E
- Country: Vietnam
- Region: Red River Delta
- Municipality: Hai Phong
- Established: 16 June 2025
- Administrative headquarters: National Route 17B, Đồng Xá Bắc Hamlet

Area
  - Total: 33.79 km^{2} (13.05 sq mi)

Population (2025)
  - Total: 42,915
  - Density: 1,270/km^{2} (3,300/sq mi)
- Website: kimthanh.haiphong.gov.vn

Kim Thành is a commune in the municipality of Hai Phong, Vietnam.

== History ==
The area of present-day Kim Thành Commune was formerly located in Kim Thành district, Hải Dương province.

On 12 June 2025, the National Assembly of Vietnam adopted Resolution No. 202/2025/QH15 on the reorganization of provincial-level administrative units, effective on the same date. Under the resolution, Hải Dương province was merged into Hai Phong, and the area where Kim Thành Commune was subsequently established became part of the municipality.

On 16 June 2025, the Standing Committee of the National Assembly of Vietnam issued a resolution on the arrangement of commune-level administrative units in Hai Phong in 2025. Under the resolution, the entire area and population of Đồng Cẩm, Tam Kỳ, and Đại Đức communes, together with part of Hòa Bình Commune, were merged to form a new commune named Kim Thành.
