= Phù Tiên district =

Former district in Vietnam

Phù Tiên is a former district of Hải Hưng province in Vietnam. It was formed on March 11, 1977, from the merger of Tiên Lữ and Phù Cừ districts.
