= Thanh Hà district =

Coordinates: 20.917°N 106.417°E

Thanh Hà District Huyện Thanh Hà
- District
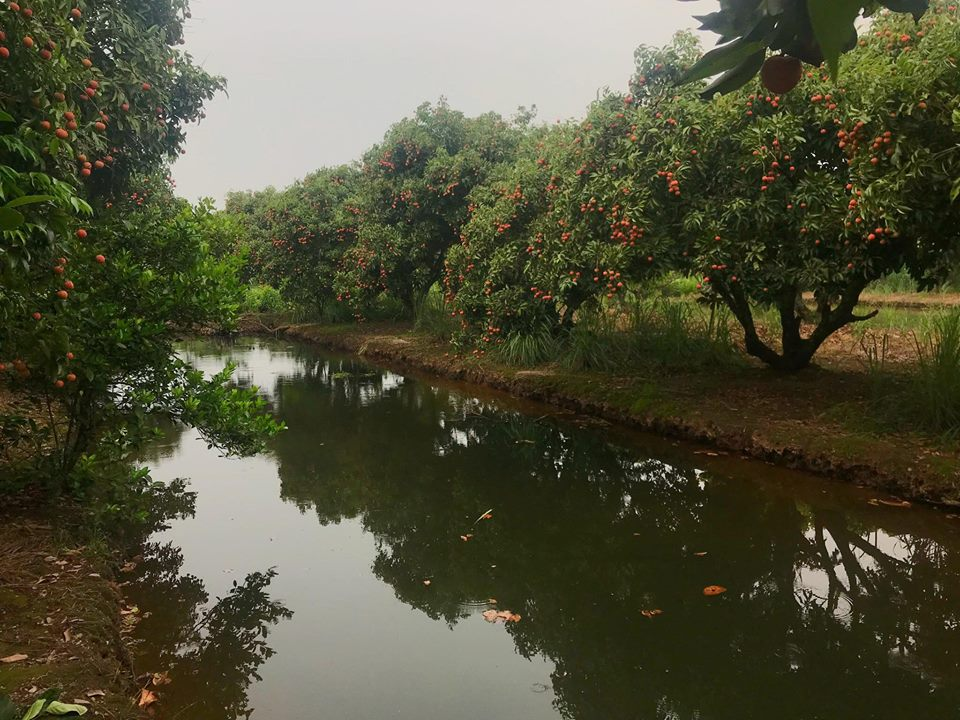
- lychee garden in Thanh Hà district
- Country: Vietnam
- Region: Red River Delta
- Province: Hải Dương
- Capital: Thanh Hà

Area
  - Total: 61 sq mi (159 km^{2})

Population (2003)
  - Total: 162,166
- Time zone: UTC+7 (Indochina Time)
- Postal code: 294
- Website: thanhha.haiduong.gov.vn

Thanh Hà is a rural district of Hải Dương province in the Red River Delta region of Vietnam.

== Demographics ==
As of 2003 the district had a population of 162,166, up from 161,517 in 2002. The district covers an area of 159 km^{2}. The district capital lies at Thanh Hà.

In 2002, the number of people who were economically active accounted to 88,082 people. Agriculture, industry and construction accounted for 84%, 9% and 7% of the workforce respectively.

== Geography and climate ==
Thanh Hà district is located in the southeast of Hải Dương. It borders Nam Sách district to the north, Kim Thành district to the east, Haiphong city to the south, and Hải Dương city to the west.

The district consists of one town, Thanh Hà (also the district capital), and 19 communes: An Phượng, Cẩm Chế, Hồng Lạc, Liên Mạc, Tân An, Tân Việt, Thanh An, Thanh Cường, Thanh Hải, Thanh Hồng, Thanh Khê, Thanh Lang, Thanh Quang, Thanh Sơn, Thanh Thủy, Thanh Xá, Thanh Xuân, Việt Hồng and Vĩnh Lập.

The terrain of the district contains the characteristic topographical alluvium of the Thái Bình River. On average it is 0.6 m (2.0 ft) above sea level.

The climate in Thanh Hà is typically tropical monsoon, with sufficient conditions to develop a thriving agriculture. Thanh Hà district has many large rivers and is surrounded by them, so there is plentiful water to serve both agricultural and residential activities. The land in Thanh Hà is shaped by its many rivers, and fruit trees are very common. The total natural area is 15,892 ha, of which agricultural land occupies 11,278 ha, some 71%. In agricultural land, 57% of the land area is fruit trees.

Thanh Hà is the only district in the Red River Delta where main crop is fruit and not rice.

== Infrastructure ==
=== Electricity ===
The district has 3 sources of power from 3 district stations at 110 kV. The district has 64 transformer stations with 6 machine transformers, with a total capacity of 20,740 kVA. 99% of households have electricity.

=== Water ===
More than 85% of farmers in the district use water for sanitation, although many households are not using water for sanitation. There are some in Thanh Hà town, and some in Hồng Lạc, Việt Hồng and Thanh An communes.

=== Transportation ===
The district has 23.6 km of provincial roads, of which district roads comprise 70%, 441 km of multi-level roads, 89 km of concrete roads and 42 km of brick roads. Thanh Hà and its many rivers produce favorable conditions for the development of waterway traffic.

=== Telecommunications ===
Presently the district has 3,482 telephones.

== Tourism ==
The district has 83 historic temples, pagodas and temples, of which 12 are state ranked.

== Historical figures ==
- During the feudal era, Thanh Hà had 29 doctoral confucianists.
- Hoàng Thị Hồng was a concubine of King Lý Anh Tông.
- Nguyễn Hữu Cầu, who was the leader of a peasant uprising in the mid-18th century.

== Specialties ==
Some specialties include lychee, sapodilla and guava, which are famous in Vietnam.
