= Phú Thái =

- Commune
- Interactive map of Phú Thái
- Coordinates: 20.964049515696253°N 106.51066475779238°E
- Country: Vietnam
- Region: Red River Delta
- Municipality: Hai Phong
- Established: 16 June 2025

Area
  - Total: 28.89 km^{2} (11.15 sq mi)

Population (2025)
  - Total: 46,234
  - Density: 1,600/km^{2} (4,100/sq mi)
- Website: phuthai.haiphong.gov.vn

Phú Thái is a commune in the municipality of Hai Phong, Vietnam.

On 12 June 2025, the National Assembly of Vietnam adopted Resolution No. 202/2025/QH15 on the reorganization of provincial-level administrative units, effective on the same date. Under the resolution, Hải Dương province was merged into Hai Phong, and the area where Phú Thái Commune was subsequently established became part of the municipality.

On 16 June 2025, the Standing Committee of the National Assembly of Vietnam issued a resolution on the arrangement of commune-level administrative units in Hai Phong in 2025. Under the resolution, the entire area and population of Phú Thái Township and Kim Xuyên, Kim Anh, and Kim Liên communes, together with part of Thượng Quận Commune, were merged to form a new commune named Phú Thái.
