= Thanh Miện =

Thanh Miện Xã Thanh Miện
- Commune
- Thanh Miện commune
- Location within Vietnam
- Coordinates: 20°47′11″N 106°14′37″E
- Country: Vietnam
- Region: Red River Delta
- Province: Hải Phòng
- Time zone: UTC+7 (UTC + 7)

Thanh Miện is a commune (xã) of Hải Phòng, Vietnam.
