= Văn Lâm district =

Văn Lâm district Huyện Văn Lâm Tế Giang huyện
- Rural District
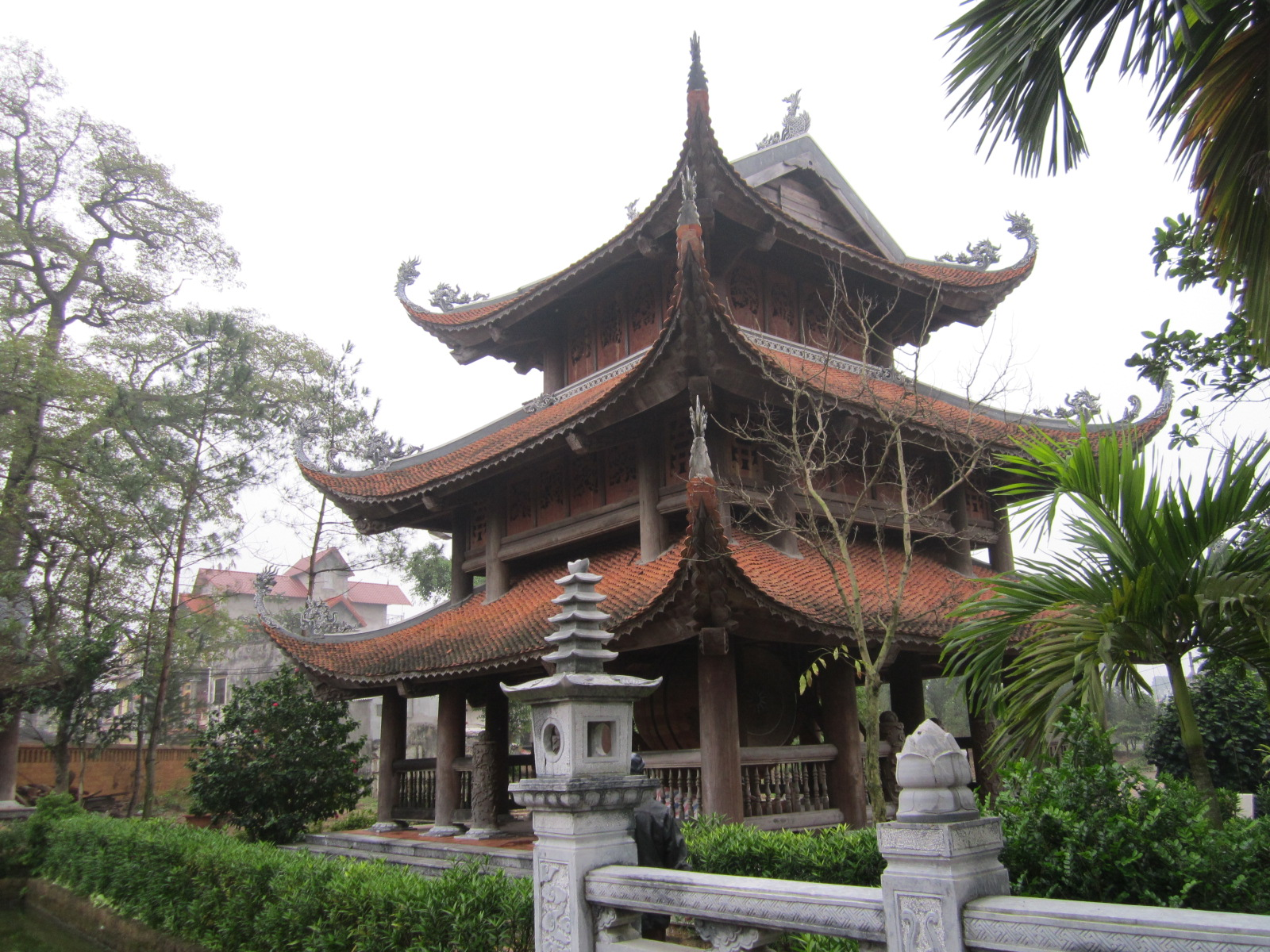
- Drum tower of a Văn Lâm pagoda.
- Nickname: "Consortland" (Xứ hậu phi)
- Interactive map of Văn Lâm district
- Country: Vietnam
- Region: Red River Delta
- Province: Hưng Yên
- Existence: February 25, 1890 to August 30, 2025
- Central hall: XXGV+QPC, Provincial Route 388, Đình Dù ward, Như Quỳnh township

Government
  - Type: Rural district
  - People Committee's Chairman: Trần Chu Đức
  - People Council's Chairman: Nguyễn Bật Khánh
  - Front Committee's Chairman: Tôn Ngọc Chuẩn
  - Party Committee's Secretary: Phạm Thái Sơn

Area
  - Rural District: 75.21 km^{2} (29.04 sq mi)

Population (2021)
  - Rural District: 135,766
  - Density: 1,805/km^{2} (4,670/sq mi)
  - Urban: 20,951
  - Metro: 114,815
  - Ethnicities: Kinh; Tanka
- Time zone: UTC+7 (Indochina Time)
- ZIP code: 1760–1764 (Note: The double code from 2024.)
- Website: Vanlam.Hungyen.gov.vn; Vanlam.Hungyen.dcs.vn

Văn Lâm [van˧˧:ləm˧˧] is a former rural district of Hưng Yên province in the Red River Delta region of Vietnam.

== History ==
On February 25, 1890, Governor-General of Indochina Jean-Luc de Saint Peauxpa signed a decision to merge all the Red Riverside rural districts of three provinces Bắc Ninh, Hưng Yên, Hải Dương to form a new administrative unit, Địch Lâm garrison (荻林道, Địch Lâm đạo), to deal with the Tán Thuật Uprising in the east of Hanoi. Accordingly, this domain was organized according to the regulation like a special-military zone, which the head must be a French colonel (quan năm vành vàng, "fifth-level official with golden lines"). Since this time, Văn Lâm rural district (文林縣, Văn Lâm huyện) has been officially established. Its name was synthesized from Văn Giang and Gia Lâm. The area of this administrative unit included some parts of localities, such as : Văn Giang, Gia Lâm and Siêu Loại.

Right after the revolt movement was defeated in 1891, the Governor-General restored civil administrative regulations with Decree 12-4 and Decision 32-11, but Văn Lâm rural district still exist as a part of Hưng Yên province.

When the State of Vietnam regime was established in 1948, this administrative unit was changed to Văn Lâm district (文林郡, quận Văn Lâm). However, it has been back with its old call since 1955 by the Democratic Republic of Vietnam regime.

On March 11, 1977, the Council of Ministers issued Decision 58/CP consolidated a number of rural districts of Hải Hưng province (by merging two provinces Hưng Yên and Hải Dương). Accordingly, the two rural districts of Văn Lâm and Mỹ Hào merged into Văn Mỹ rural district (文美縣, huyện Văn Mỹ).

On March 24, 1979, the Council of Ministers continued to issue Decision 70/CP to adjust the boundaries of rural districts of Hải Hưng province. Accordingly, Văn Mỹ district merged with 14 communes in Văn Yên district to establish a new unit named Mỹ Văn rural district (美文縣, huyện Mỹ Văn).

On February 24, 1997, Như Quỳnh township (如琼市镇, thị trấn Như Quỳnh) was established on the basis of Như Quỳnh commune in Mỹ Văn rural district.

By September 1, 1999, the Government of Vietnam has issued Decree 60/1999/NĐ-CP on the division of Mỹ Văn district into three new districts : Mỹ Hào, Văn Lâm and Yên Mỹ. Therefore, Văn Lâm rural district was re-established.

On July 31, 2020, the Ministry of Construction issued Decision 1005/QĐ-BXD on recognition of the central urban development zone of Văn Lâm rural district (including Như Quỳnh township and 5 communes Đình Dù, Lạc Đạo, Lạc Hồng, Tân Quang, Trưng Trắc) were grade IV urban areas.

== Geography ==
=== Topography ===
According to the 2021 statistical yearbook of the whole Hưng Yên province, Văn Lâm rural district covers an area of 75.21 km^{2}. Currently, it has all 11 commune-level administrative units.

- 1 municipality : Như Quỳnh township (capital).
- 10 communes : Chỉ Đạo, Đại Đồng, Đình Dù, Lạc Đạo, Lạc Hồng, Lương Tài, Minh Hải, Tân Quang, Trưng Trắc, Việt Hưng.

Although the terrain of the rural district is quite flat, it still tends to gradually lower from the Northwest to the Southeast. With an average height of 3 to 4 meters above sea level, this district is considered to be the highest location in Hưng Yên province.

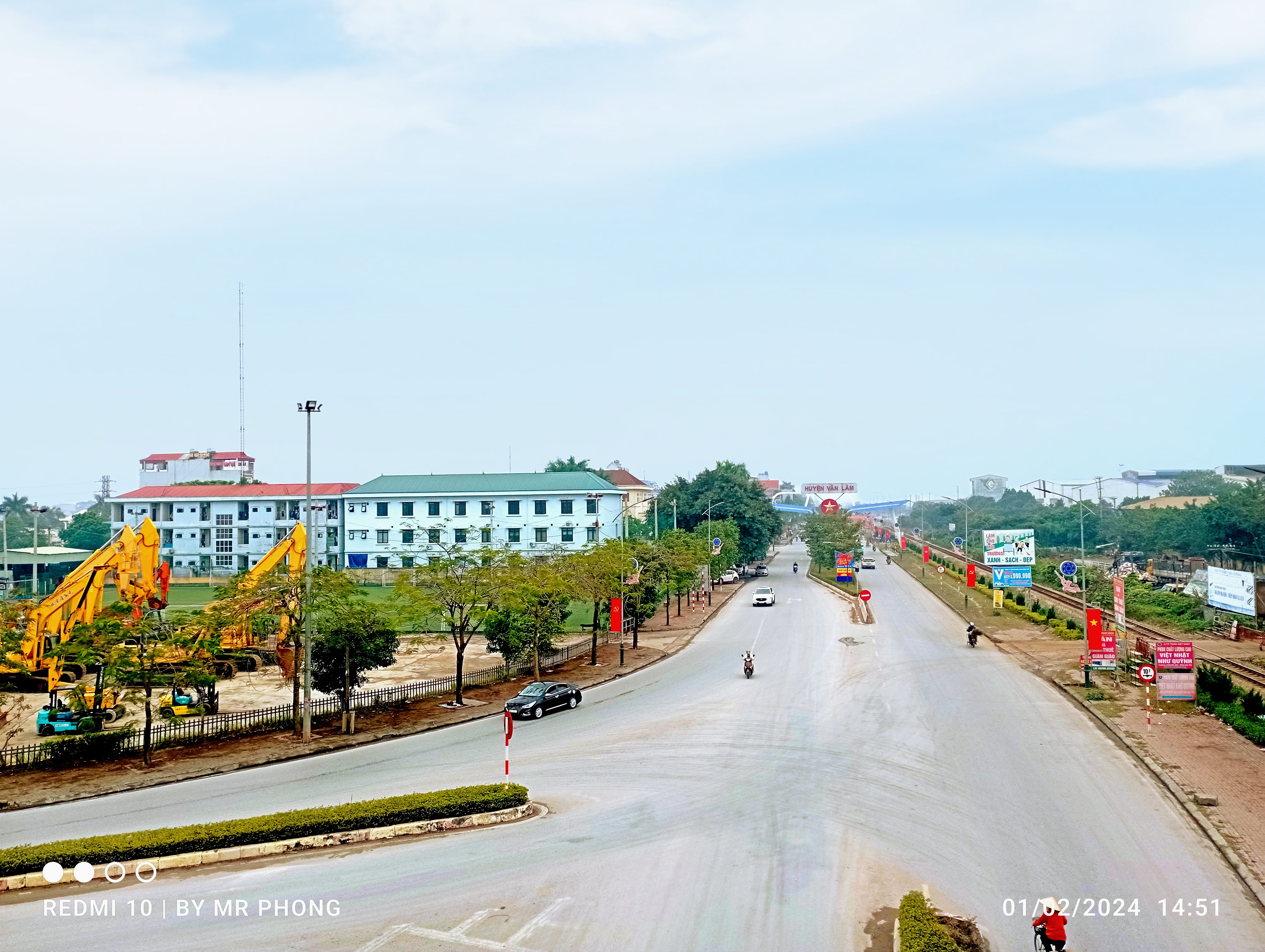
Provincial Route 385.

Especially, the overall area of the district does not have any river, other than some artificial canals, but its underground contains ancient groundwater with extremely large capacity. This advantage has turned the rural district into an important clean water supply for Hưng Yên City, with an output of 100,000 m^{3}/day.

Văn Lâm also located on many national routes and power lines, which has a strategic range of the Northern Vietnam. Such as : National Route 5A, inter-provincial roads of Hưng Yên - Bắc Ninh and Hà Nội - Hưng Yên, Hà Nội - Hải Phòng Railway and Ring Road IV. Besides, Phố Nối 500KV Transformer Station is the largest power supply point in the whole province.

=== Population ===
The population of Văn Lâm rural district reached 135,766 by 2021. In terms of administrative procedures, all citizens in the rural district are registered as Kẻ Kinh.

Văn Lâm rural district is originally in the area of the Bắc Ninh Diocese since 1883, but it was not until 1926 that a small parish area (now Đình Tổ P. and Hướng Đạo P. A. (Note: Giáo xứ Đình Tổ (xã Đại Đồng) & giáo họ Hướng Đạo (xã Lạc Đạo) & giáo điểm Hành Lạc (thị trấn Như Quỳnh), giáo hạt Bắc Ninh, giáo phận Bắc Ninh.)) was established and so far this community is still the only parish of the whole district. Đình Tổ Parish is part of the Bắc Ninh Deanery, what is completely located in Đình Tổ hamlet (or Tó village) of Đại Đồng commune, in Lạc Đạo commune and Như Quỳnh township. There were all 326 parishioners until 2024. Their patron saints are Francis Xavier (Đình Tổ) and Anthony of Padua (Hướng Đạo). The current priest is Bishop Joseph Đỗ Quang Khang, who was ordained on December 23, 2023.

== See also ==
- Cẩm Giàng district
- Thuận Thành district
