= Cẩm Bình =

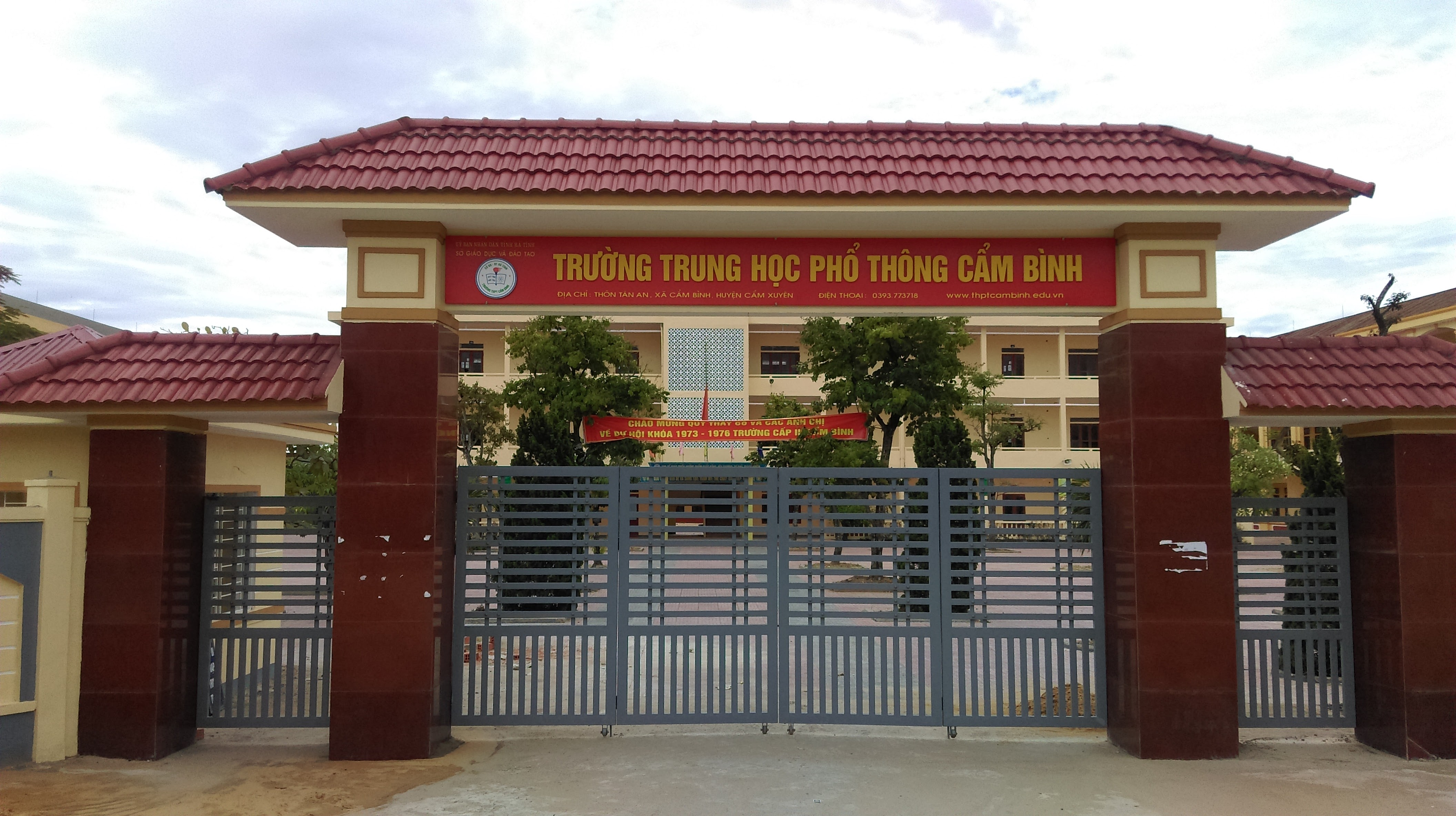
- Cẩm Bình High School
- Interactive map of Cẩm Bình
- Coordinates: 18.304683786181972°N 105.96207621952621°E
- Country: Vietnam
- Region: North Central Coast
- Province: Hà Tĩnh
- Established: 16 June 2025

Area
  - Total: 33.14 km^{2} (12.80 sq mi)

Population (2025)
  - Total: 25,305
  - Density: 763/km^{2} (1,980/sq mi)

Cẩm Bình is a commune in Hà Tĩnh province, Vietnam.

On 16 June 2025, the Standing Committee of the National Assembly of Vietnam issued Resolution No. 1665/NQ-UBTVQH15. Under the resolution, the entire area and population of Cẩm Vịnh commune, Thạch Bình commune, Cẩm Thành commune, and Cẩm Bình commune were merged to form a new commune named Cẩm Bình.
