= Tứ Kỳ district =

Coordinates: 20.833°N 106.383°E

- District
- Country: Vietnam
- Region: Red River Delta
- Province: Hải Dương
- Capital: Thanh Miện

Area
  - Total: 64 sq mi (165 km^{2})

Population (2018)
  - Total: 152,541
  - Density: 2,390/sq mi (923/km^{2})
- Time zone: UTC+07:00 (Indochina Time)
- Website: tuky.haiduong.gov.vn

Tu Ky (Vietnamese: Tứ Kỳ) is a district (huyện) of Hải Dương province in the Red River Delta region of Vietnam.

As of 2003 the district had a population of 167,664. The district covers an area of 168 km^{2} (65 sq mi). The district capital lies at Tứ Kỳ.
