= Tứ Kỳ =

Tứ Kỳ Xã Tứ Kỳ
- Commune
- Tứ Kỳ commune
- Location within Vietnam
- Coordinates: 20°49′08″N 106°24′26″E
- Country: Vietnam
- Region: Red River Delta
- Province: Hải Phòng
- Time zone: UTC+7 (UTC + 7)
- Website: http://tuky.haiphong.gov.vn/

Tứ Kỳ is a commune (xã) of Hải Phòng, Vietnam.
