= Hải Dương =

- Ward
- Interactive map of Hải Dương
- Coordinates: 20.938243130921244°N 106.33652199076158°E
- Country: Vietnam
- Region: Red River Delta
- Municipality: Hai Phong
- Established: 16 June 2025
- Administrative headquarters: 106 Trần Hưng Đạo Street

Area
  - Total: 6.51 km^{2} (2.51 sq mi)

Population (2025)
  - Total: 51,522
  - Density: 7,914/km^{2} (20,500/sq mi)
- Website: haiduong.haiphong.gov.vn

Hải Dương is a ward in the municipality of Hai Phong, Vietnam. The ward inherited its name from the former Hải Dương City and Hải Dương province.

On 12 June 2025, the National Assembly of Vietnam adopted Resolution No. 202/2025/QH15 on the reorganization of provincial-level administrative units, effective on the same date. Under the resolution, Hải Dương province was merged into Hai Phong, and the area where Hải Dương Ward was subsequently established became part of the municipality.

On 16 June 2025, the Standing Committee of the National Assembly of Vietnam issued a resolution on the arrangement of commune-level administrative units in Hai Phong in 2025. Under the resolution, the entire area and population of Trần Hưng Đạo, Nhị Châu, Ngọc Châu, and Quang Trung wards were merged to form a new ward named Hải Dương.
