= Ninh Giang district =

Ninh Giang District Ninh Giang
- District
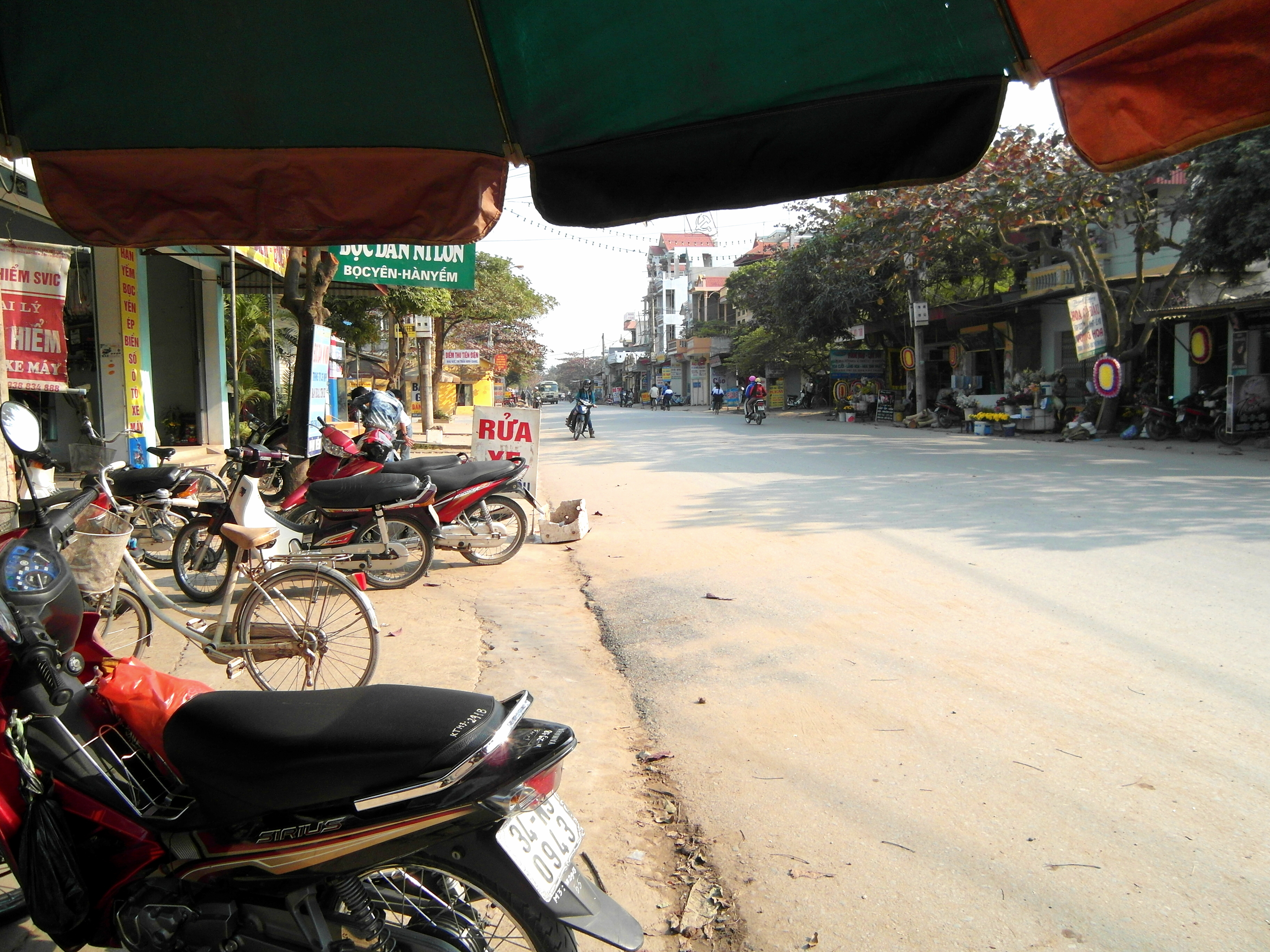
- A street in Ninh Giang
- Country: Vietnam
- Region: Red River Delta
- Province: Hải Dương
- Capital: Nam Sách

Area
  - Total: 523 sq mi (1,354 km^{2})

Population
  - Total: 190,077
- Time zone: UTC+07:00 (Indochina Time)
- Website: https://ninhgiang.haiduong.gov.vn

Ninh Giang (Vietnamese: Ninh Giang) is a district (huyện) of Hải Dương province in the Red River Delta region of Vietnam.

As of 2003 the district had a population of 148,120. The district covers an area of 135 km^{2} (52 sq mi). The district capital lies at Ninh Giang.

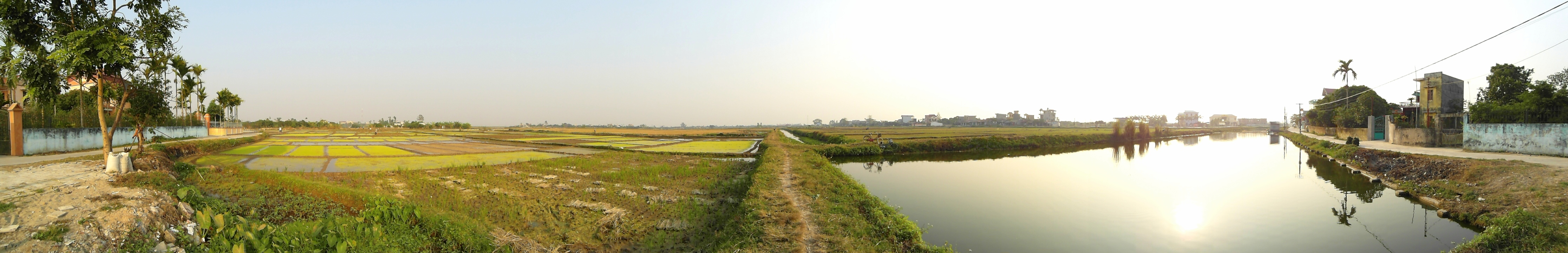
Rice fields near Ninh Giang, as seen from Chợ Vé village.
