= Văn Giang district =

District in Hưng Yên province, Vietnam

Văn Giang district Huyện Văn Giang Tế Giang huyện
- District
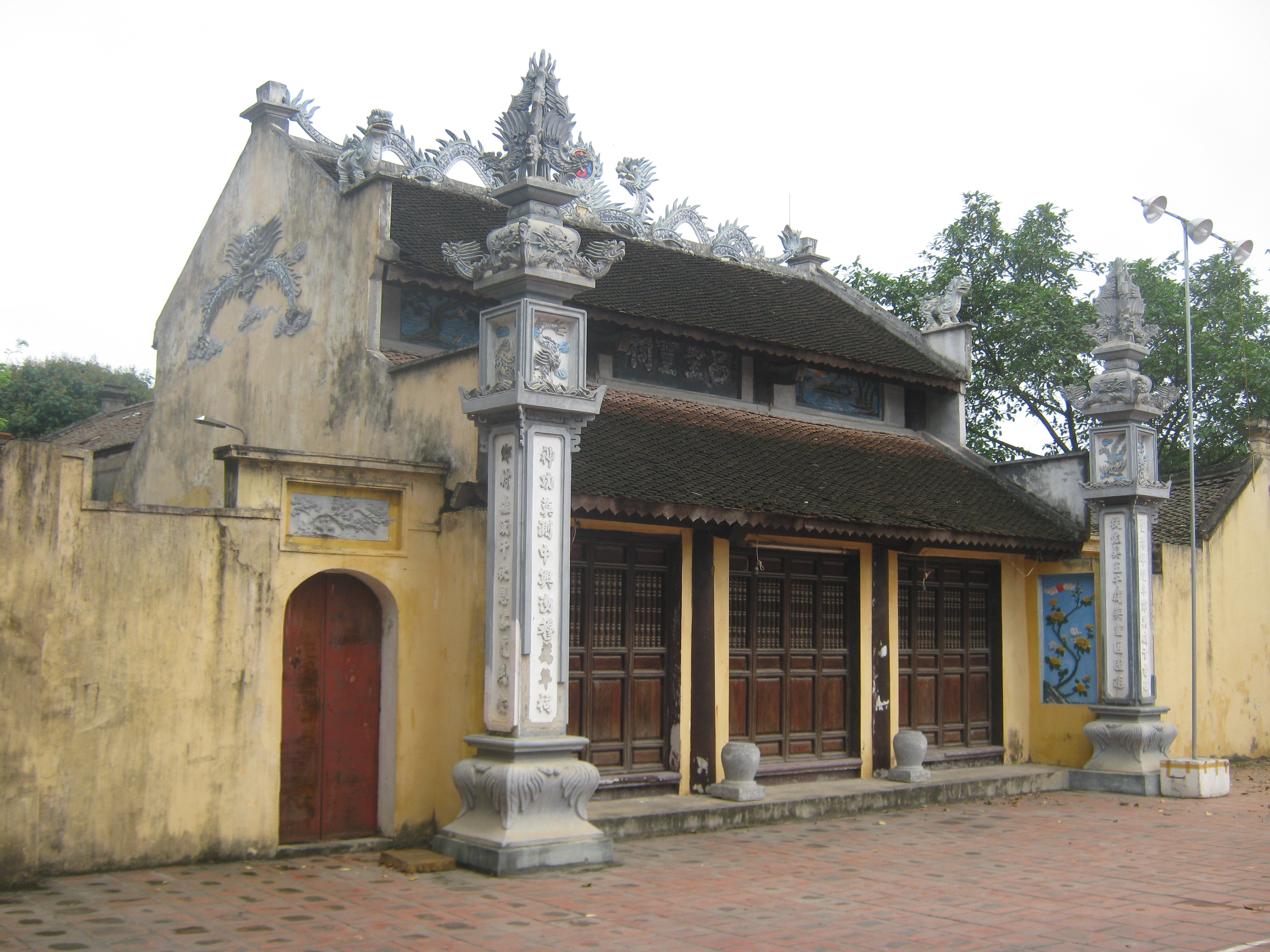
- Bến village communal house, place to worship warlord Lữ Đường.
- Coordinates: 20°56′14″N 105°55′34″E
- Country: Vietnam
- Region: Red River Delta
- Province: Hưng Yên
- Establishment: 1009
- Central hall: Không Tên Road, Văn Giang township

Government
  - Type: Rural district
  - People Committee's Chairman: Nguyễn Văn Tuấn
  - People Council's Chairman: Chu Quốc Hiệu
  - Front Committee's Chairman: Đặng Văn Dũng
  - Party Committee's Secretary: Lê Văn Hưng

Area
  - District: 71.95 km^{2} (27.78 sq mi)

Population (2020)
  - District: 123,480
  - Density: 1,716/km^{2} (4,440/sq mi)
  - Urban: 11,604
  - Metro: 111,876
  - Ethnicities: Kinh; Tanka
- Time zone: UTC+7 (Indochina Time)
- ZIP code: 17650
- Website: Vangiang.Hungyen.gov.vn; Vangiang.Hungyen.dcs.vn

Văn Giang is a rural district of Hưng Yên province in the Red River Delta region of Vietnam.

== History ==
=== Middle Ages ===
According to the surveys of researcher Philippe Papin, at the beginning of Christ era, the Southeastern area of modern Hanoi was still under the sea level, so it was very difficult to settle down.

Since the middle of the belonging to the North, according to the records of the officials from the mainland China, the area of modern Hưng Yên province was almost swampy. Therefore, in the middle of the 10th century, a military leader named Lữ Đường relied on this muddy terrain to rule as a feud. The area was slenderly called as Tế Giang (細江, "the tiny stream") by the folks. It was only a small flow, which connected the Hồng River with Thương and Cầu River. According to An Nam chí lược and Đại Việt sử ký toàn thư, it was in the area of an administrative unit called as Cổ Lãm châu (古揽州, "K'lam canton"). Specifically, cổ lãm or k'lam means "the forest" in Annamese language. (Note: By ideas of researchers Tạ Chí Đại Trường and Nguyễn Hùng Vỹ : K'lam, kẻ lãm, cổ lãm, cảm lãm, khả lam, gia lâm...)

In 995, the Early Lê Dynasty changed it to Cổ Pháp châu (古法州, "Cổ Pháp canton"). However, by 1009, right after winning the golden throne, Emperor Thuận Thiên ordered to change it to Thiên Đức phủ (天德府, "Thiên Đức prefecture"). It was not until that time that there was an official administrative unit called Tế Giang huyện (細江縣, "Tế Giang rural district").

When the Lý Dynasty moved the capital to Thăng Long citadel, Tế Giang was part of Gia Lâm huyện (嘉林縣, "Gia Lâm rural district"), what still belonged to Thiên Đức. Coming to the Trần Dynasty, it belonged to Bắc Giang lộ (北江路, "Bắc Giang garrison"). The reason for this name was because of the dangerous nature of the area. The capital of this locality was located in Vạn Kiếp, where there was a regulation like a military barracks to prevent the entire North and East of Thăng Long.

When the Ming Dynasty ruled Annam at the beginning of 15th century, Tế Giang was part of Gia Lâm châu (嘉林州, "Gia Lâm canton"), Bắc Giang phủ (北江府, "Bắc Giang prefecture").

In the 10th year of Quang Thuận of the Later Lê Dynasty, Tế Giang was changed to Văn Giang huyện (文江縣, "Văn Giang rural district"), belonging to Thuận An phủ (順安府, "Thuận An prefecture"), Kinh Bắc thừa tuyên (京北承宣, "Kinh Bắc garrison"). This domain continued to be strengthened to protect the East of the capital.

About 1832, Emperor Minh Mệnh changed Kinh Bắc to Bắc Ninh province. By 1862, Thuận An was changed to Thuận Thành. Thus, Văn Giang belonged to Thuận Thành phủ (順城府, "Thuận Thành prefecture"), Bắc Ninh tỉnh (北寧省, "Bắc Ninh province").

=== 20th century ===
It was changed to Văn Giang district (文江郡, Văn Giang quận) in 1947 by the French provisional military government in Tonkin, then belonged to Hưng Yên province. That decree randomly turned Bắc Ninh suddenly into the smallest province in Vietnam for a long time. However, it was changed to Văn Giang rural district (文江縣, huyện Văn Giang) in 1955 by the government of the Democratic Republic of Vietnam.

On March 11, 1977, districts Văn Giang (North) and Yên Mỹ (South) have been merged to become Văn Yên rural district (文安縣, huyện Văn Yên).

On February 24, 1979, Văn Yên was dissolved. 9 Văn Giang communes and 5 Yên Mỹ communes were merged into Khoái Châu to become Châu Giang rural district (州江縣, huyện Châu Giang). The remaining Văn Yên communes have been merged with Văn Mỹ communes to become Mỹ Văn rural district (美文縣, huyện Mỹ Văn).

On May 14, 1999, Văn Phúc commune was changed into Văn Giang township (文江市鎮, thị trấn Văn Giang), the capital of Mỹ Văn. After that, on July 24, the Government of Vietnam issued Decree 60/1999/NĐ-CP on the re-establishment of Văn Giang rural district (文江縣, huyện Văn Giang). Accordingly, Châu Giang rural district was separated into two districts of Khoái Châu and Văn Giang, moving two communes of Nghĩa Trụ and Vĩnh Khúc from Mỹ Văn district back to Văn Giang.

=== 21st century ===
On June 10, 2024, Vietnamese Prime Minister Phạm Minh Chính issued Decision 489/QĐ-TTg approving the planning of Hưng Yên province in the period from 2021 to 2030, with a vision to 2050. Accordingly, the whole area of Hưng Yên will have to become one of the country's direct-controlled municipalities, what falls under the administration of the central government. From this project, Văn Giang has the opportunity to invest very strongly to become a central urban district of the new city.

== Geography ==
Văn Giang rural district has all 11 commune-level administrative units :

- 1 township : Văn Giang.
- 10 communes : Cửu Cao, Liên Nghĩa, Long Hưng, Mễ Sở, Nghĩa Trụ, Phụng Công, Tân Tiến, Thắng Lợi, Vĩnh Khúc, Xuân Quan.

=== Topography ===
The domain of Văn Giang has the same shape similar to an isosceles triangle, with flat terrain and there are many locations what are still lower than sea level. It covers an area of 71.95 km^{2}.

According to geological surveys since the beginning of the 20th century, due Văn Giang is located in the middle of the three large rivers of Hồng, Đuống and Luộc, its area has a huge reserves of alluvium, which is the basis for a very strong agriculture. However, it is also a great disadvantage, when it is often devastated by floods and landslides every year.

=== Population ===
As of 2020 Văn Giang rural district had a population of 123,480. All people across the locality are registered as Kẻ Kinh.

According to the 2005 yearbook of the Vietnam Catholic Church, the territory of Văn Giang is part of the Tây Hưng Yên Deanery, belonging to the Thái Bình Cathedral Diocese.

== See also ==
- Gia Lâm district
- Văn Lâm district
- Yên Mỹ district
