= Thanh Miện district =

Coordinates: 20.767°N 106.233°E

Thanh Mien District Huyện Thanh Miện
- District
- Country: Vietnam
- Region: Red River Delta
- Province: Hải Dương
- Capital: Thanh Miện

Area
  - Total: 47 sq mi (122 km^{2})

Population (2003)
  - Total: 131,552
- Time zone: UTC+07:00 (Indochina Time)
- Website: thanhmien.haiduong.gov.vn

Thanh Miện is a rural district of Hải Dương province in the Red River Delta region of Vietnam. As of 2003 the district had a population of 131,552. The district covers an area of 122 km^{2}. The district capital lies at Thanh Miện.
