= Nam Sách =

Nam Sách Xã Nam Sách
- Commune
- Nam Sách commune
- Location within Vietnam
- Coordinates: 20°59′27″N 106°20′03″E
- Country: Vietnam
- Region: Red River Delta
- Province: Hải Phòng
- Time zone: UTC+7 (UTC + 7)
- Website: namsach.haiphong.gov.vn

Nam Sách is a commune (xã) of Hải Phòng, Vietnam.
