= Gia Lộc district =

Coordinates: 20.867°N 106.300°E

Gia Lộc District Huyện Gia Lộc
- District
- Interactive map of Gia Lộc District
- Country: Vietnam
- Region: Red River Delta
- Province: Hải Dương
- Capital: Gia Lộc

Area
  - Total: 47 sq mi (122 km^{2})

Population (2003)
  - Total: 151,177
- Time zone: UTC+07:00 (Indochina Time)

Gia Lộc is a rural district of Hải Dương province in the Red River Delta region of Vietnam. As of 2003 the district had a population of 151,177. The district covers an area of 122 km^{2}. The district capital lies at Gia Lộc.
