= Kinh Môn =

- Ward
- Interactive map of Kinh Môn
- Coordinates: 20.990785033475547°N 106.55437255214198°E
- Country: Vietnam
- Region: Red River Delta
- Municipality: Hai Phong
- Established: 16 June 2025

Area
  - Total: 11.47 km^{2} (4.43 sq mi)

Population (2025)
  - Total: 24,948
  - Density: 2,174/km^{2} (5,630/sq mi)
- Website: kinhmon.haiphong.gov.vn

Kinh Môn is a ward in the municipality of Hai Phong, Vietnam. The ward inherited its name from the former Kinh Môn town, Hải Dương province.

== History ==
The area of present-day Kinh Môn Ward was formerly located in Kinh Môn town, Hải Dương province.

On 12 June 2025, the National Assembly of Vietnam adopted Resolution No. 202/2025/QH15 on the reorganization of provincial-level administrative units, effective on the same date. Under the resolution, Hải Dương province was merged into Hai Phong, and the area where Kinh Môn Ward was subsequently established became part of the municipality.

On 16 June 2025, the Standing Committee of the National Assembly of Vietnam issued a resolution on the arrangement of commune-level administrative units in Hai Phong in 2025. Under the resolution, the entire area and population of An Lưu, Hiệp An, and Long Xuyên wards were merged to form a new ward named Kinh Môn.
