= Cẩm Giàng district =

Coordinates: 20.950°N 106.217°E

Cẩm Giàng district Huyện Cẩm Giàng
- District
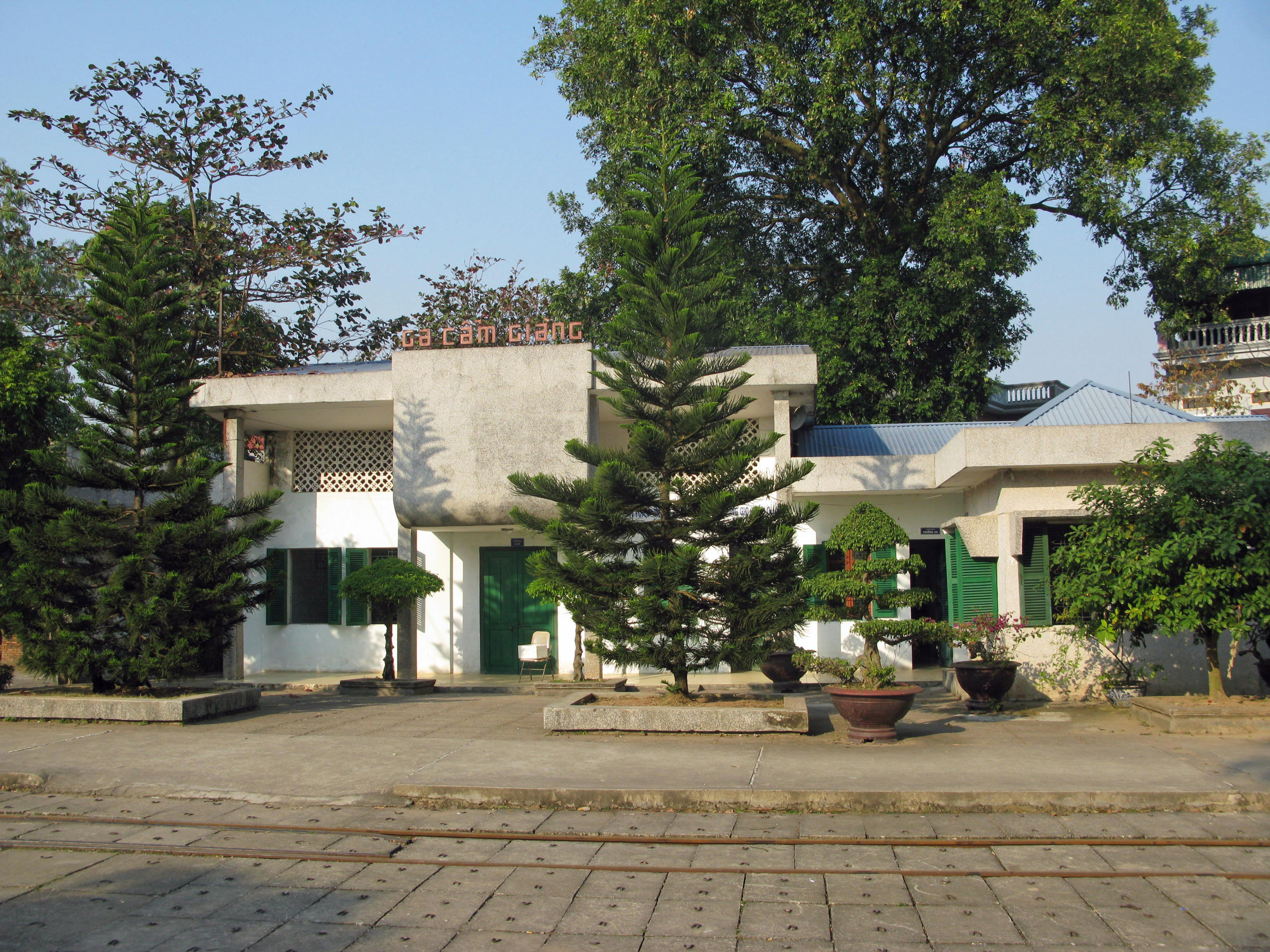
- Railway Station in Cẩm Giàng
- Interactive map of Cẩm Giàng district
- Country: Vietnam
- Region: Red River Delta
- Province: Hải Dương
- Capital: Lai Cách

Area
  - Total: 42 sq mi (109 km^{2})

Population (2003)
  - Total: 121,298
- Time zone: UTC+07:00 (Indochina Time)

Cẩm Giàng is a rural district (huyện) of Hải Dương province in the Red River Delta region of Vietnam. As of 2003 the district had a population of 121,298. The district covers an area of 109 km^{2}. The district capital lies at Lai Cách town.
