= Bình Giang district =

Coordinates: 20.867°N 106.200°E

Bình Giang district Huyện Bình Giang
- District
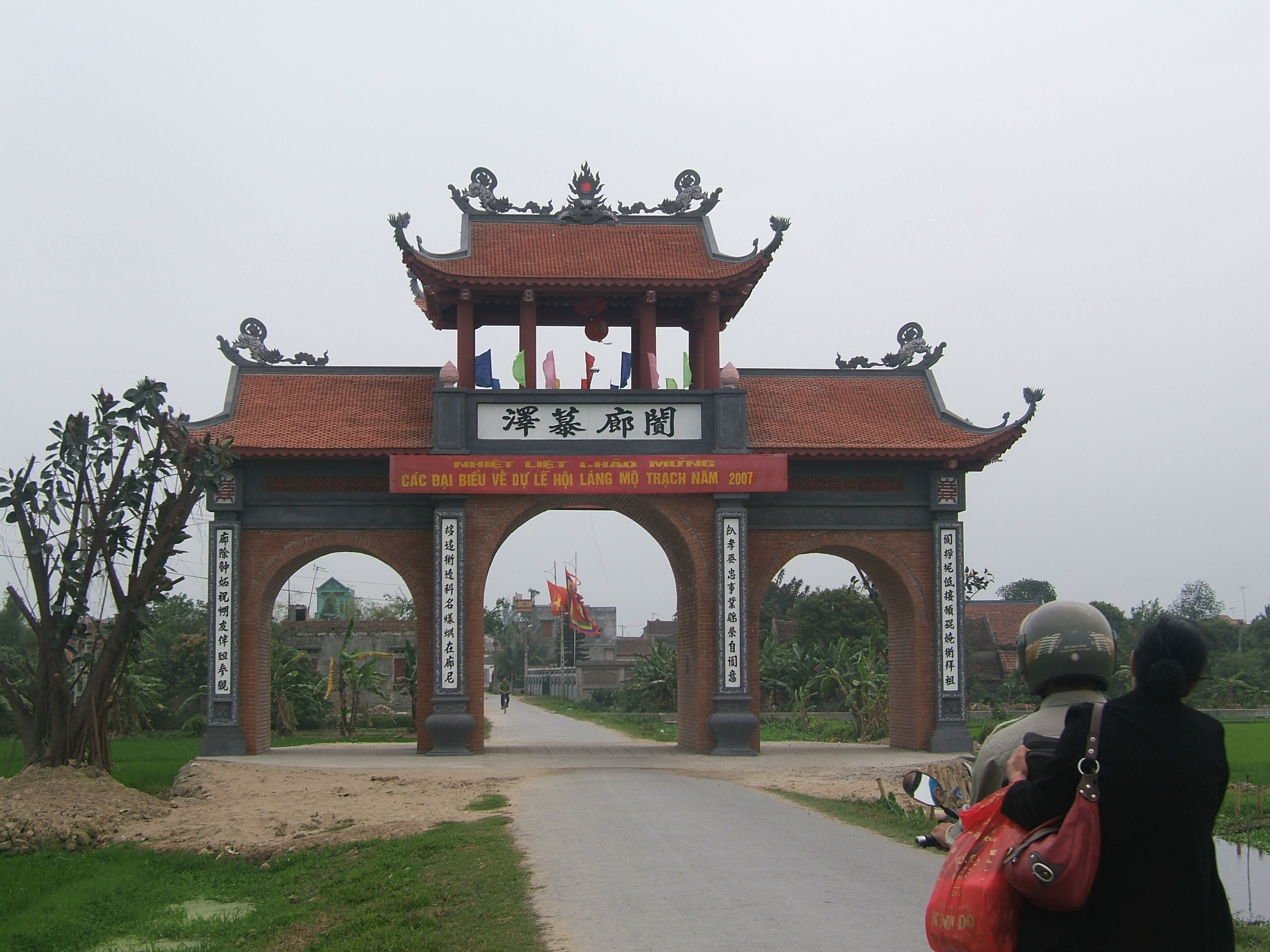
- Chùa Nôm – Linh Thông Cổ Tự temple
- Interactive map of Bình Giang district
- Country: Vietnam
- Region: Red River Delta
- Province: Hải Dương
- Capital: Kẻ Sặt

Area
  - Total: 41 sq mi (105 km^{2})

Population (2003)
  - Total: 106,689
- Time zone: UTC+07:00 (Indochina Time)

Bình Giang is a rural district (huyện) of Hải Dương province in the Red River Delta region of Vietnam. As of 2003 the district had a population of 106,689. The district covers an area of 105 km^{2}. The district capital lies at Kẻ Sặt.
