= Kim Thành district =

Coordinates: 20.950°N 106.500°E

Kim Thành District Huyện Kim Thành
- District
- Interactive map of Kim Thành District
- Country: Vietnam
- Region: Red River Delta
- Province: Hải Dương
- Capital: Phú Thái

Area
  - Total: 44 sq mi (113 km^{2})

Population (2003)
  - Total: 125,633
- Time zone: UTC+07:00 (Indochina Time)

Kim Thành is a former rural district of Hải Dương province in the Red River Delta region of Vietnam. As of 2003 the district had a population of 125,633. The district covers an area of 113 square kilometres (44 sq mi). The district capital lies at Phú Thái.
