= Tô Oanh =

- Occupations: retired teacher, journalist, blogger
- Known for: Democracy activism

Tô Oanh is a Vietnamese retired teacher, journalist, and blogger who has written extensively about the Vietnamese government's censorship of media and human rights violations. Oanh was previously a journalist for Vietnam's state media, but expressed dissenting opinions in his writing and was dismissed from his post. In 2007, he transitioned to online media and blogging.

== Work & Activism ==
Oanh writes for his blog and other online media, campaigning for free media, democracy, and greater protection of human rights in Vietnam. He also peacefully campaigns against China's territorial aggression in the South China Sea, and advocates for Vietnam's claims over the Paracel Islands and Spratly Islands.

== Incidents ==
On July 13, 2016 two plainclothes men followed Oanh and his wife as they traveled by motorbike in the Soc Sen district of Hanoi, attacking the couple as they traveled through a remote area. The couple was pushed off their motorbike and sustained injuries from the attack.

In April 2015, Oanh was pushed off his motorbike in the Hung Yen Province.

In April 2014, Oanh traveled with other citizen journalists Kim Chi, Ngo Nhat Dang, Nguyen Dinh Ha and Le Thanh Tung to the U.S. to speak at a congressional briefing ahead of World Press Freedom Day. After returning from the United States, he was subjected to hours of interrogation at the Vietnamese border.

== See also ==
- Human rights in Vietnam
