= Yên Mỹ (disambiguation) =

Yên Mỹ may refer to:

- Yên Mỹ, a commune of Hưng Yên province
- Yên Mỹ district, a former district of Hưng Yên province
