= Kim Động district =

Kim Động district Huyện Kim Động Kim động
- Rural District
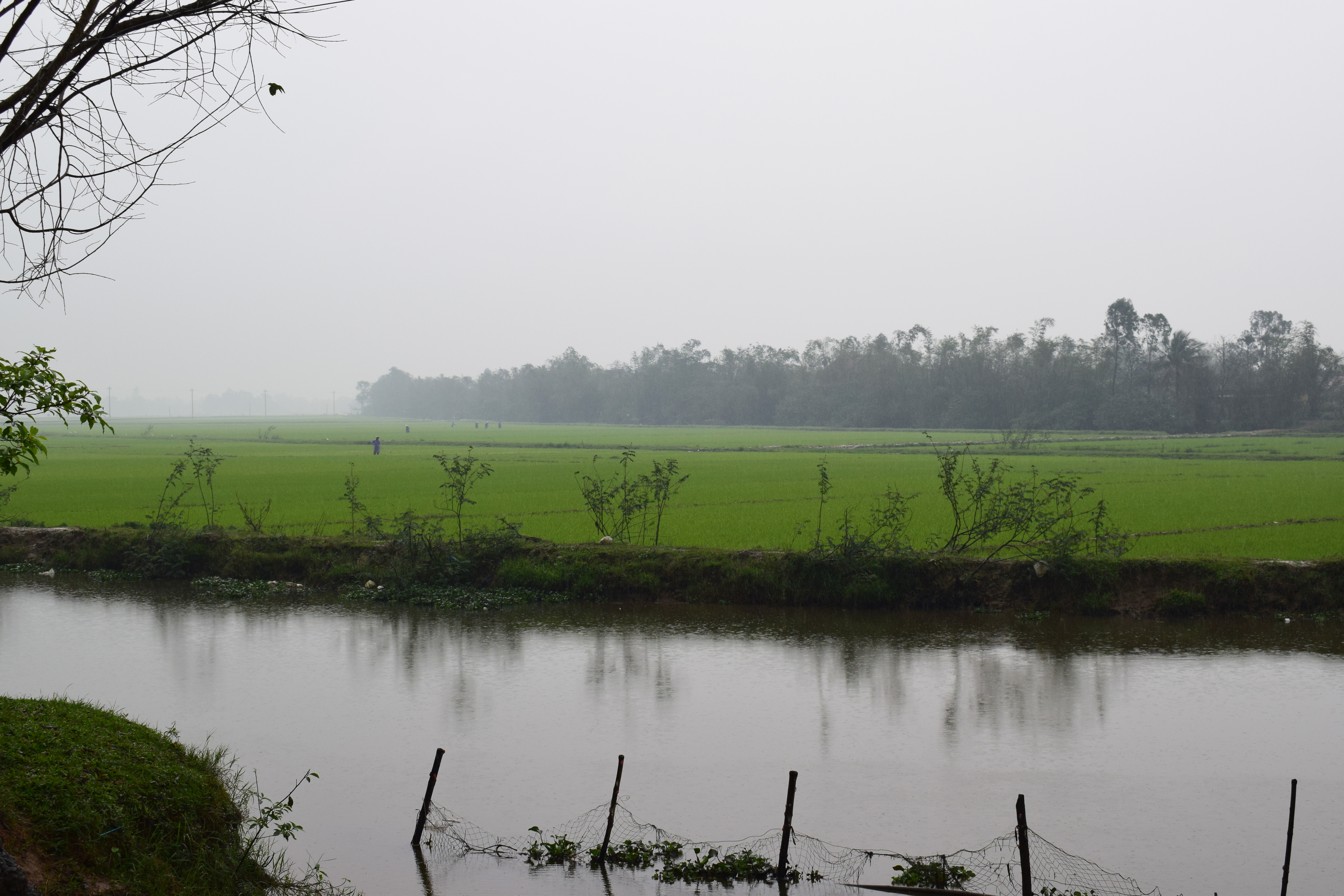
- Rice paddy in Kim Động.
- Motto(s): "Solidarity – Democracy – Innovation – Development" (Đoàn kết – Dân chủ – Sáng tạo – Phát triển)
- Interactive map of Kim Động district
- Coordinates: 20°44′13″N 106°3′55″E
- Country: Vietnam
- Region: Red River Delta
- Province: Hưng Yên
- Existence: XIII century to August 30, 2025
- Central hall: No.221, Nguyễn Lương Bằng road, Lương Bằng township

Government
  - Type: Rural district
  - People Committee's Chairman: Trần Văn Bằng
  - People Council's Chairman: Nguyễn Chi Hội
  - Front Committee's Chairman: Trương Thị Ngọc Ánh
  - Party Committee's Secretary: Bùi Văn Phúc

Area
  - Rural District: 103.38 km^{2} (39.92 sq mi)

Population (2020)
  - Rural District: 118,416
  - Density: 1,145/km^{2} (2,970/sq mi)
  - Urban: 10,084
  - Metro: 103,332
  - Ethnicities: Kinh; Tanka
- Time zone: UTC+7 (Indochina Time)
- ZIP code: 17900
- Website: Kimdong.Hungyen.gov.vn; Kimdong.Hungyen.dcs.vn

Kim Động [kim˧˧:ɗə̰ʔwŋ˨˩] is a former rural district of Hưng Yên province in the Red River Delta region of Vietnam.

== History ==
=== Middle Ages ===
According to the external documents of the Hưng Yên Provincial People's Committee, name Kim Động (金洞) only actually appeared in administrative documents from the Trần Dynasty, or the 13th century. By surveys of researchers Lê Chí Quế, Nguyễn Hùng Vỹ and Lê Văn Lan, this word is in the case of recording, which is similar to name "Phù Đổng", an ancient place of Sóc Sơn district. However, from then until the beginning of the Later Lê Dynasty, Kim động ("Kim commune") was not classified as one of the administrative units, but it was only part of Đằng châu ("Đằng canton").

By Đại Việt sử ký toàn thư, it was not until 1469 that Emperor Hồng Đức ordered to set the national map of the Annamese Empire. Kim Động rural district (金洞縣, Kim Động huyện) was officially part of Khoái Châu prefecture, Sơn Nam garrison. This administrative unit has almost no volatility for many centuries.

=== XX century ===
Under the State of Vietnam regime, Kim Động rural district has been changed to Kim Động district (金洞郡, quận Kim Động), but its boundary has been kept. However, its old name was restored in 1955 under the Democratic Republic of Vietnam regime.

On February 24, 1979, according to Decision 70/CP of the Council of Ministers, Kim Động merged with Ân Thi into Kim Thi rural district (金施縣, huyện Kim Thi) belonging to Hải Hưng province.

After 17 years of consolidation, in April 1996, to implement Decree 05/NĐ-CP dated January 27, 1996, by Prime Minister Võ Văn Kiệt, Kim Thi rural district was separated into two districts of Kim Động and Ân Thi as before.

=== XXI century ===
From 1979 to 2013 and the journey from 2023 to 2035, Kim Động rural district was constantly reducing the area and number of communes to contribute to strengthening Hưng Yên town, which has now become Hưng Yên city, by Resolution 2637/QĐ-UBND of the Hưng Yên Provincial People's Committee.

On June 10, 2024, Prime Minister Phạm Minh Chính issued Decision 489/QĐ-TTg approving the planning of Hưng Yên province in the period from 2021 to 2030, with a vision to 2050. Accordingly, the whole area of Hưng Yên will strive to meet the standards of the country's direct-controlled municipality, what falls under the administration of the central government. From that purpose, the remaining area of Kim Động rural district will become an urban district in future.

== Geography ==
=== Topography ===
Bắc Kỳ hà đê sự tích (圻北河堤事跡, "the river dike embankments in Tonkin") recorded the terrain of Kim Động in the early French protectorate.

Currently, Kim Động rural district is divided into 15 commune-level administrative units, what includes : Lương Bằng township (capital), Chính Nghĩa, Diên Hồng, Đồng Thanh, Đức Hợp, Hiệp Cường, Hùng An, Mai Động, Nghĩa Dân, Ngọc Thanh, Phạm Ngũ Lão, Phú Thọ, Song Mai, Toàn Thắng, Vĩnh Xá.

According to the 2021 statistical yearbook of the whole Hưng Yên province, Kim Động rural district covers an area of 103.38 km^{2}. Three rivers Hồng, Bần and Kim Ngưu are the most important natural water sources of the whole district. Simultaneously, Kim Động shared an alluvial isle on the Hồng River with Phú Xuyên rural district of Hanoi. Most of the isle area belongs to Kim Động.

=== Population ===
As of 2021 the rural district had a population of 118,426. Besides, the population of the whole rural district is fully registered as Kinh people.

In the area of Kim Động rural district, there is only one parish called Hoàng Xá ("the sandy village"), under the Lý Nhân Deanery of the Hanoi Archdiocese. The Parish is divided into 4 parish areas : Bồng Châu, Kệ Châu, Hoàng Đông, Phượng Lâu. As of 2024, 982 people were parishioners. Their patron saint was chosen as the late Pope John Paul II. Currently, the priest is Bishop Joseph Ngụy Thành Khương, who ordained at 9:30 AM, on October 4, 2023.

== Culture ==
As of 2024, Kim Động rural district has a total of 165 relics recognized in levels from the province to country. In particular, there is a national treasure (quốc bảo) on archeology that has been recognized by 2022. It was a set of five gold lotus flower-shaped plates dating back to the 11th to 12th century, which was discovered in Cộng Vũ commune (popularly Mụa village) in 1965.

According to old custom, on the 5th day of the Rooster Lunar New Years, the people in Phú Thịnh commune always held a water procession festival (lễ rước nước) by a dragon boat. This is for wishing to the heavens for help in controlling the weather.

== Economy ==
For many decades, Kim Động rural district has been one of the localities with the highest poverty rate in Vietnam. People's lives almost only revolve around the production of rice. Although it often produced high yields, but because of low price, it has led to an unstable income.

Lương Bằng township is the intersection of the national routes 38 and 39, but it has not yet shown the prominence in commercial and consumer activities. Therefore, as soon as the passing of the COVID-19 pandemic, that is, starting from 2023, the Hưng Yên – Thái Bình Highway construction project has been actively implemented in the hope of promoting the inherently inferior economy of the whole district. This plan has received great attention from the Government of Vietnam and some investors from South Korea. This project was completed by the end of 2023 to the period 2024–2025, then complete and put into use.

The West of Kim Động has the Hồng River, which is flowing through the rural district and has fostered continuously for more than a thousand years, thus it has a huge amount of sand, which is very suitable for construction activities. However, due to the situation of exploitation more than the allowed threshold, so from the beginning of the 2000s, these sand mines were gradually closed by the central government, which was affected by floods that made the dike usually broken.

== See also ==
- Duy Tiên district
- Khoái Châu district
- Phú Xuyên district
- Tiên Lữ district
