= Vũ Xá =

Vũ Xá may refer to several places in Vietnam, including:

- Vũ Xá, Hưng Yên, a rural commune of Kim Động District.
- Vũ Xá, Bắc Giang, a rural commune of Lục Nam District.
