= Lương Bằng =

- Commune
- Interactive map of Lương Bằng
- Coordinates: 20°45′18″N 106°3′54″E
- Country: Vietnam
- Region: Red River Delta
- Province: Hưng Yên province
- Established: 22 March 2002 (township); 16 June 2025 (commune)

Area
  - Total: 29.08 km^{2} (11.23 sq mi)

Population (2025)
  - Total: 39,420
  - Density: 1,355/km^{2} (3,510/sq mi)

Lương Bằng is a commune in Hưng Yên province, Vietnam.

On 16 June 2025, the National Assembly of Vietnam adopted Resolution No. 203/2025/QH15 amending and supplementing several articles of the Constitution of the Socialist Republic of Vietnam, effective on the same date. Under the resolution, district-level administrative units nationwide ceased to operate from 1 July 2025.

The Standing Committee of the National Assembly of Vietnam issued Resolution No. 1666/NQ-UBTVQH15 on the arrangement of commune-level administrative units in Hưng Yên province in 2025, effective from 16 June 2025. Under the resolution, the entire area and population of Lương Bằng township and Phạm Ngũ Lão, Chính Nghĩa, and Diên Hồng communes, formerly part of Kim Động district, were merged to form a new commune named Lương Bằng.
