= Phù Cừ district =

Coordinates: 20.733°N 106.183°E

Phù Cừ district Huyện Phù Cừ Phù Dung huyện
- Rural District
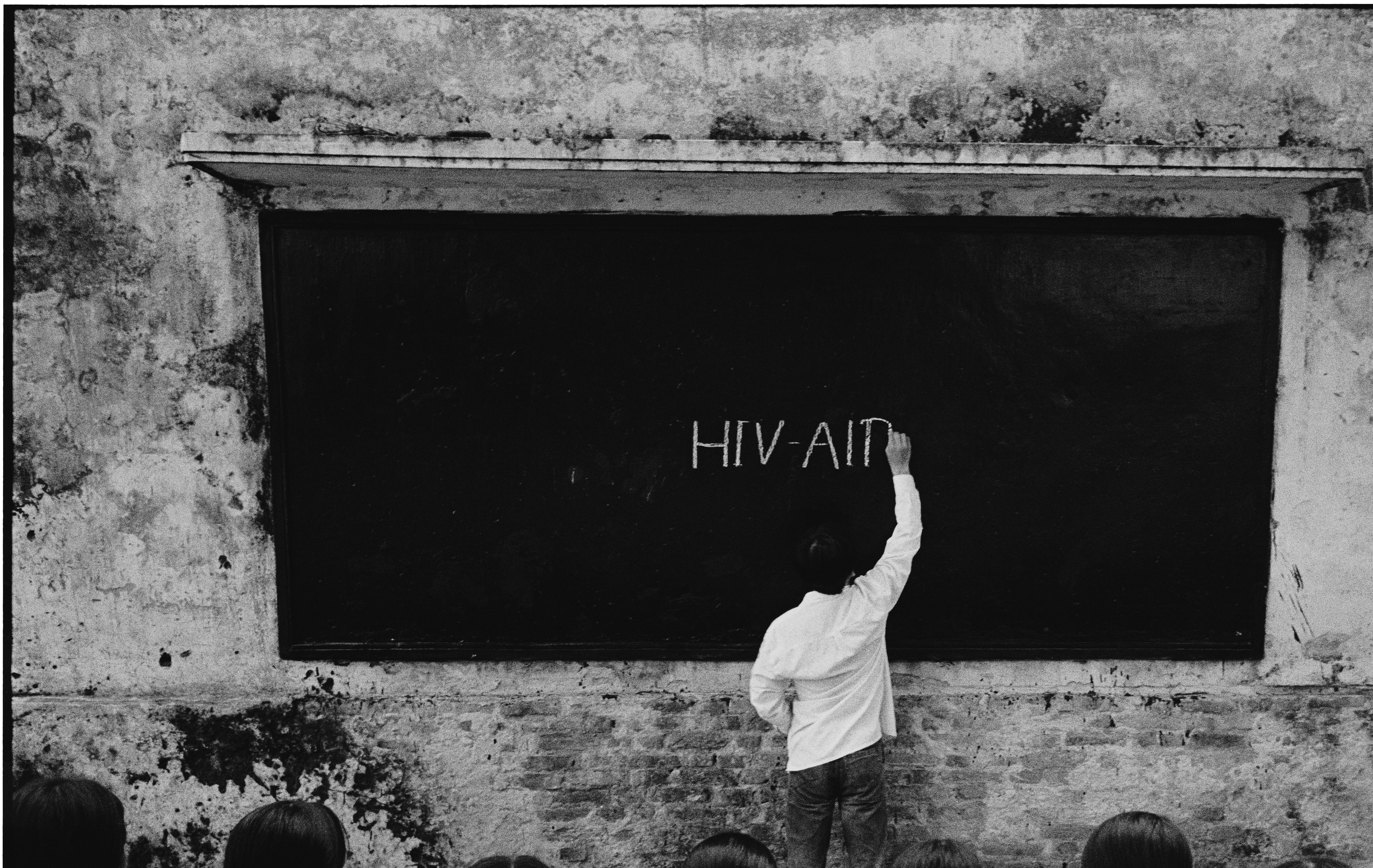
- Secondary pupils learn about HIV-AIDS in Phù Cừ.

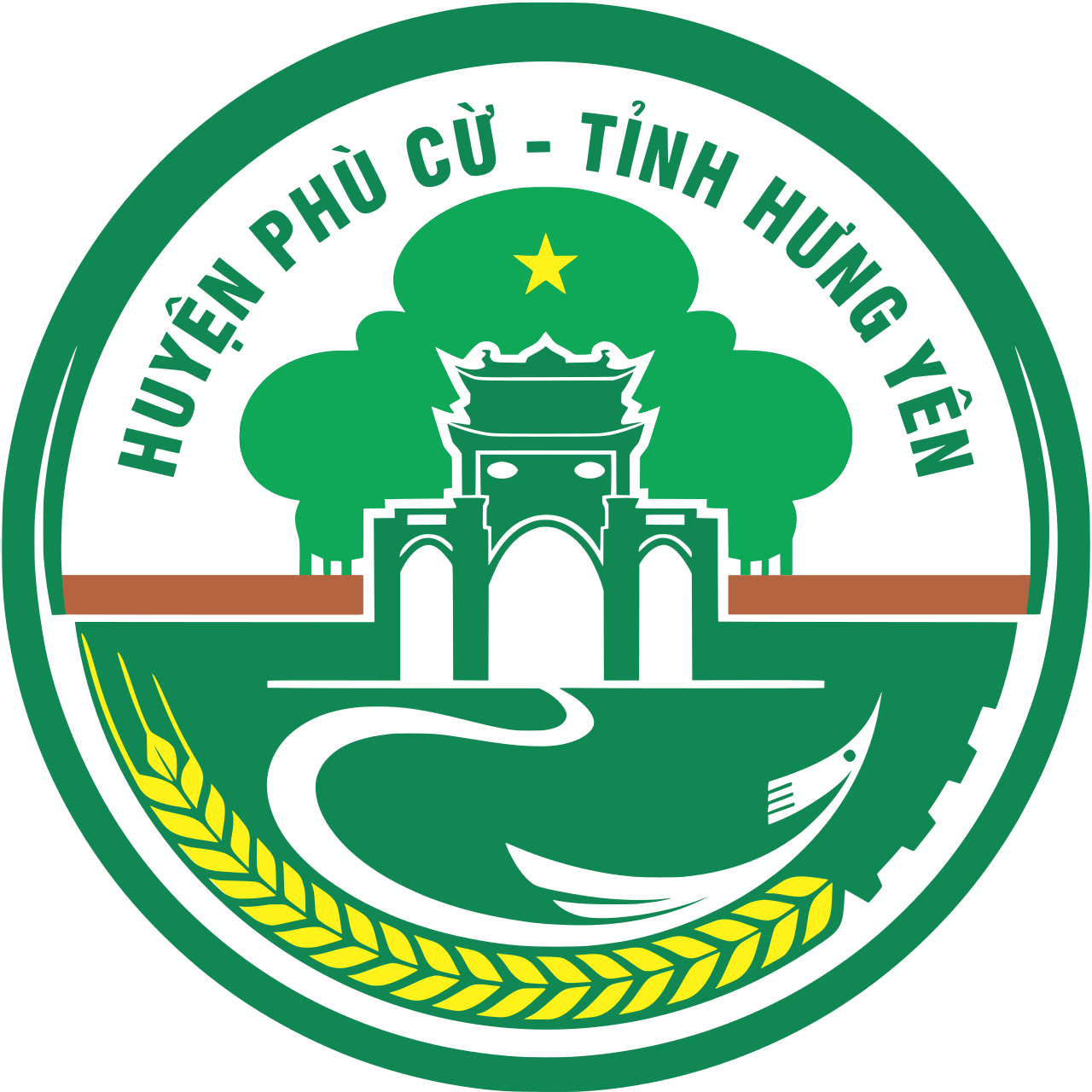
- Seal
- Interactive map of Phù Cừ district
- Country: Vietnam
- Region: Red River Delta
- Province: Hưng Yên
- Existence: 1252 to August 30, 2025
- Central agency: P5QH+9QQ, Trần Cao township

Government
  - Type: Rural district
  - People Committee's Chairman: Doãn Quốc Hoàn
  - People Council's Chairman: Trần Văn Đoàn
  - Front Committee's Chairman: Nguyễn Thị Quyên
  - Party Committee's Secretary: Trần Văn Đoàn

Area
  - Rural District: 94.64 km^{2} (36.54 sq mi)

Population (2021)
  - Rural District: 80,329
  - Density: 849/km^{2} (2,200/sq mi)
  - Urban: 6,323
  - Metro: 74,006
  - Ethnicities: Kinh; Tanka
- Time zone: UTC+7 (Indochina Time)
- ZIP code: 17300 (Note: An official code from 2022 to 2025.)
- Website: Phucu.Hungyen.gov.vn; Phucu.Hungyen.dcs.vn

Phù Cừ [fṳ˨˩:kɨ̤˨˩] is a former rural district of Hưng Yên province in the Red River Delta region of Vietnam.

== History ==
=== Middle ages ===
According to researchers Philippe Papin and Keith Weller Taylor, until before the 13th century, the domains in the East of Thăng Long were most forests or swamps, thus they were very rugged with insignificant population density. That natural condition has helped the capital to be protected, but it also became an obstacle for exploitation. By the remnants of the Han Dynasty, around the first century after Christ, the area of modern Hưng Yên province had only a small settlement with its very low population called as Cửu Diên (Note: By ideas of researchers Tạ Chí Đại Trường and Nguyễn Hùng Vỹ, words "cửu-diên", "cửu-liên" or "mạc-liên" are the Hanese ways of the phonetic for "k'len", "t'len" or "sen" (originated from Sanskrit "kamala" कमल) in ancient Annamese language, which mean "lotus [bund]".) (九鳶), belonging Giao Chỉ district. However, this was still just a way of frivolous calling, not yet accepted as an official administrative unit. Thus, since the Han Dynasty to the Early Lê Dynasty with nearly a thousand years, this locality existed as a deserted area, where did not leave any impression in historical chronicles. However, the Early Lê Dynasty brought it into parts of Khoái garrison. Shortly later, Khoái garrison continued to be changed to Khoái canton.

It was not until 1952 that an officially administrative unit called Phù Dung rural district (Note: "Phù dung" (芙蓉) is a different way of calling for lotus.) (芙蓉縣, Phù Dung huyện) appeared in this area. It was part of Khoái Châu prefecture. Until the establishment of the Mạc Dynasty was established, it continued to be renamed Phù Hoa rural district (芙花縣, Phù Hoa huyện) to avoid the real name of Emperor Minh Đức. (Note: Mạc Đăng Dung (莫登庸). From the pronunciation of Annamese people, 蓉 and 庸 are read as "dung" [zuŋ˧˧].) However, the Revival Lê Dynasty restored its old name right after chasing the Mạc Dynasty to Cao Bình canton. Thus, Phù Dung was part of Sơn Nam garrison, then Sơn Nam Thượng garrison.

In the 12th year of Minh Mệnh (1831), Hưng Yên province was established in the split of Sơn Nam Thượng garrison. This new administrative unit consisted of two prefectures Khoái Châu and Tiên Hưng. Therefore, Phù Dung was still part of Khoái Châu prefecture and belonged to one of eight rural districts of the province.

In the 2nd year of Thiệu Trị (1842), Phù Dung was continued to change its name as Phù Cừ rural district (Note: "Phù cừ" (芙蕖) is also a different way of calling for lotus.) (芙蕖縣, Phù Cừ huyện) to avoid the real name of Emperor Thiệu Trị. (Note: Nguyễn Phước Dung (阮福曧). From the pronunciation of Annamese people, 蓉 and 曧 are also read as "dung" [zuŋ˧˧].) However, in the 4th year of Tự Đức (1858), Phù Cừ was transferred to Tiên Hưng prefecture. By the 6th year of Thành Thái (1894), Annamese court transferred again the two rural districts Phù Cừ and Tiên Lữ to Khoái Châu prefecture. Therefore, Tiên Hưng has only two rural districts Duyên Hà and Hưng Nhân to merge into Thái Bình province.

=== XX century ===
Under the State of Vietnam regime, Phù Cừ rural district was changed to Phù Cừ district (芙蕖郡, quận Phù Cừ). However, in 1955, the former administrative unit was restored under the Democratic Republic of Vietnam regime.

On January 27, 1968, according to the resolution of the 3rd North Vietnam National Assembly, two provinces Hải Dương and Hưng Yên were merged to become Hải Hưng province. Thus, Phù Cừ rural district belonged to Hải Hưng. By March 11, 1977, the Council of Ministers issued Decision 58-CP on the consolidation of some rural districts of Hải Hưng province. In particular, two districts Phù Cừ and Tiên Lữ were merged into Phù Tiên rural district (芙仙縣, huyện Phù Tiên).

On November 6, 1996, the Vietnam National Assembly issued the Resolution on the division and adjustment of administrative boundaries in some provinces. Accordingly, Hải Hưng has been split into two new provinces of Hải Dương and Hưng Yên. Therefore, Phù Tiên belonged to Hưng Yên province. By February 24, 1997, the Government of Vietnam issued Decree 17-CP on the division of Phù Tiên rural district into new districts Phù Cừ and Tiên Lữ.

=== XXI century ===
On September 22, 2000, Trần Cao commune was transferred to the township, where was the capital of Phù Cừ rural district, by Decree 50/2000/NĐ-CP of the Government of Vietnam.

== Geography ==
=== Topography ===
According to the 2021 statistical yearbook of the whole Hưng Yên province, Phù Cừ rural district covers an area of 94.64 km^{2}. Currently, it has all 13 commune-level administrative units.

- 1 municipality : Trần Cao capital-township (or customarily Phố Cao).
- 12 communes : Đình Cao, Đoàn Đào, Minh Hoàng, Minh Tân, Nguyên Hòa, Nhật Quang, Phan Sào Nam, Quang Hưng, Tam Đa, Tiên Tiến, Tống Phan, Tống Trân.

Like other rural districts in whole Hưng Yên province, Phù Cừ has relatively flat terrain and even many areas are still lower than sea level. This has a significant impact on the lives of residents every time in the rainy season.

The area of Phù Cừ has only one small stream called Nghĩa Lý river (sông Nghĩa Lý). Besides, Luộc river is the natural boundary of Phù Cừ with Thái Bình province, and Cửu An river is the boundary of the district with Hải Dương province.

=== Population ===
As of 2021 Phù Cừ rural district had a population of 80,329. In particular, all people are registered as Kẻ Kinh.

The area of Phù Cừ is said to be the earliest location to receive the Gospel of Hưng Yên province about XVII century, and so far it is still the district with the largest Catholic population. It is now part of Đông Hưng Yên Deanery, Thái Bình Cathedral Diocese, which is led by the Dominican priests.

- Cao Xá Parish in Trần Cao township.
- Phương Bồ Parish at Phương Bồ village, Phan Sào Nam commune.
- Tần Nhẫn Parish at Tần Tiến village, Minh Tân commune.
- Võng Phan Parish at Võng Phan village, Tống Trân commune.

== See also ==
- Hưng Hà district
- Quỳnh Phụ district
- Thanh Miện district
