= Vehicle registration plates of Vietnam =

Socialist Republic of Viet Nam
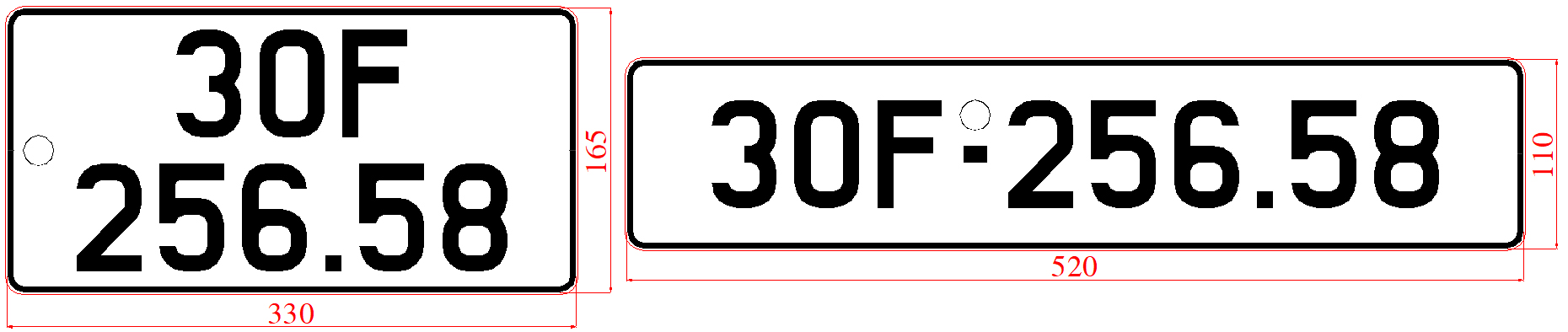
- For automobiles (5-digit, uncolored)

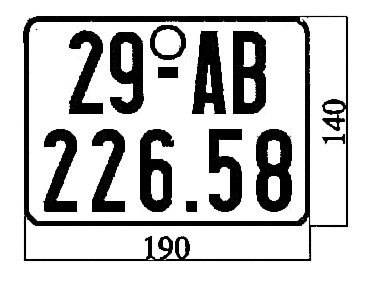
- For motorbikes (5-digit, uncolored)
- Country: Vietnam
- Country code: VN (GMS CBTA)

Current series
- Material: Aluminium
- Serial format: Motorbikes: DDLL-DDD.DD; Automobiles: DDL-DDD.DD
- Introduced: 2003; 5-digit serial plates: 2010; Current template with yellow plates for commercial operations: 2020; Latest format revision: 2023

Availability
- Issued by: Ministry of Public Security
- Manufactured by: H08

Vehicle registration plates in Vietnam are mandatory license plates for motor vehicles used on public roads in Vietnam. License plates were first used when Vietnam was a French colony. The Ministry of Public Security is responsible for the issuance and numbering of vehicles.

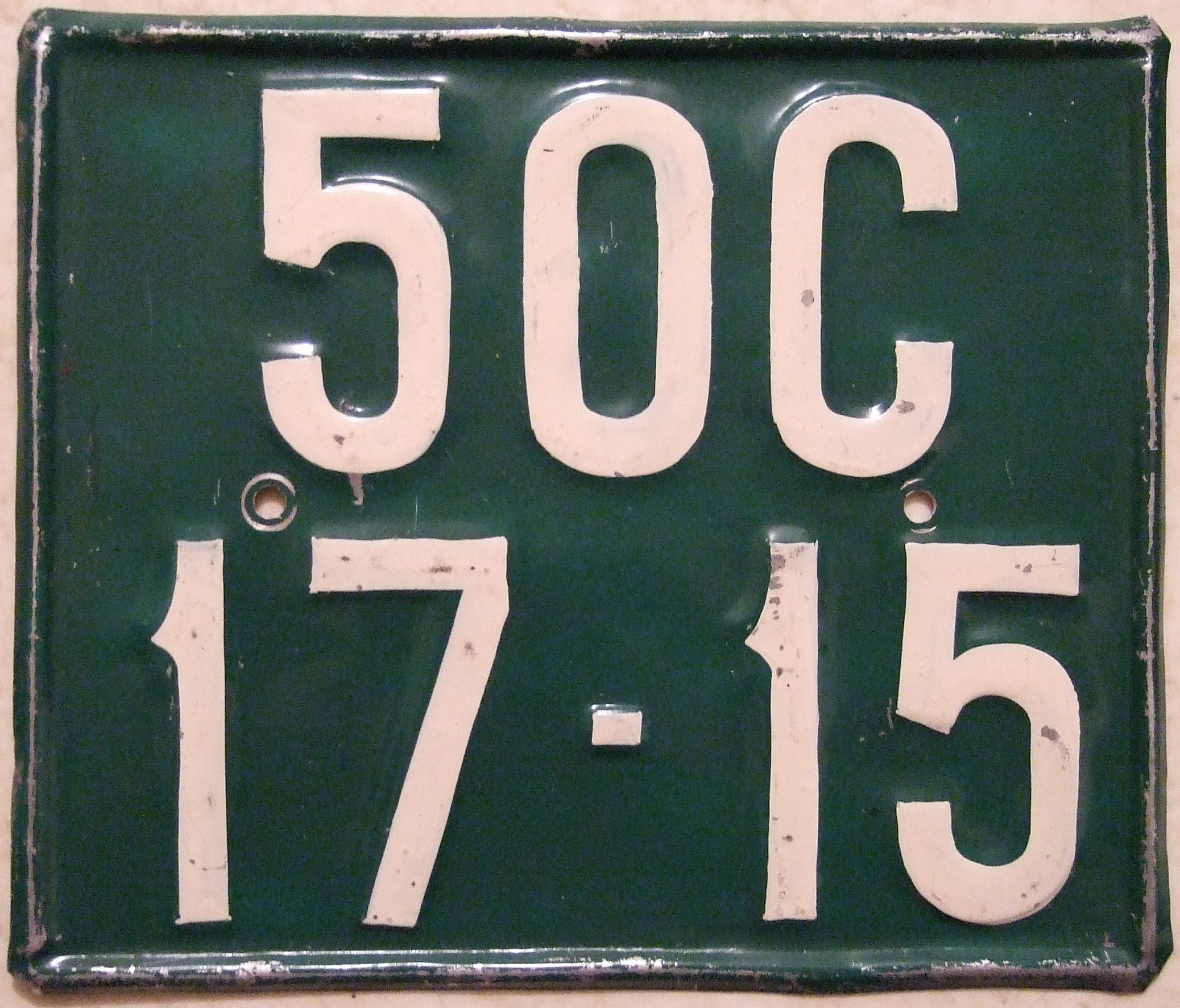
Vietnamese plate example (1975–1995)

== History ==
=== French protectorate ===
In French Indochina, license plates were white-on-black on XXX1111 type, XXX is location code. 1111 can be anything (serial numbers).

=== 1978–1984 ===
Vietnamese plates in 1978–1984 were white-on-black and similar to previous one, but had 4 digits then 3 letters. 3 letters are city name, but based on Vietnamese language.

=== 1984–2003 ===
From 1984 to 2003 (current version) is black-on-white, then later green-on-white, with city name. Plates were A 1111 format, then 1A 1111 format, then AA 1111 format, then was going to switch to AAA 111 format, but the plan was cancelled. The leading two symbols are two digits, representing the province/municipality. The exact date of format changing is unknown. In 2012, a blue strip with a "VN" will be added on the left-hand side of the plates, as required by new ASEAN licensing agreements, yet this rule has never been in force.

The leading two numerals refer to the various provinces and major municipalities of Vietnam, unless they are letters (AA, AB, AC, and so on) which signify that the car belongs to the Ministry of Defence – in which case the plate will be red. Some plates also carry a red two-letter code following the provincial numerals, with "NG" (for ngoại giao) used for a diplomatic or NGO plate and "LD" for a vehicle belonging to a company which is 100% foreign-owned. If a colored letter (A, B, or C) follows the province code, the vehicle belongs to the local government.

==== Colors ====
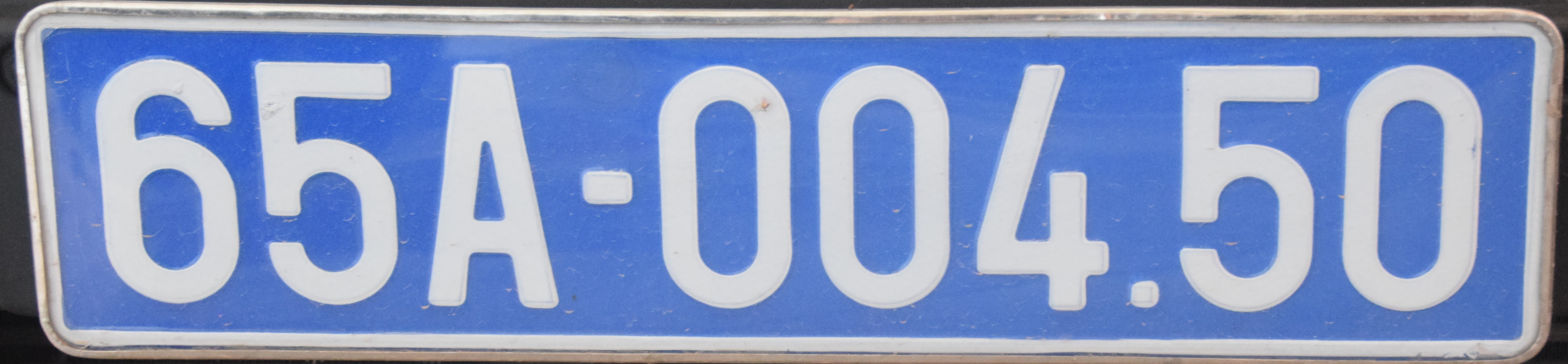
A blue plate issued for the Cần Thơ (65) city authorities.

- President's cars, Government's cars, law enforcement cars – White on blue
- Private vehicles – Black on white
- Commercial vehicle, construction vehicles – Black on yellow
- Military's cars – White on red
- Diplomat's cars – Black on white with red NG code
- Foreigner-owned cars – Black on white with black NN code

== Formats ==
For cars, front plates measure 47 × 11 cm, rear ones are 27 × 20. In 2020 and 2021, both plates measure 6 x 12. The current scheme for civilian vehicles omits the letters I, J, O, Q and W, with the letter R reserved for trailers, and includes the Vietnamese character Đ.

=== Regular plates ===
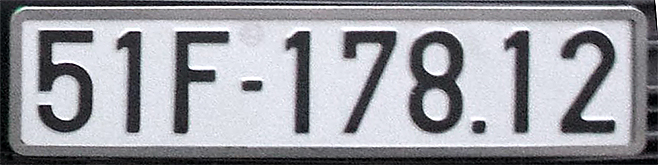
Vietnamese private vehicle plate (pre-2020 template).

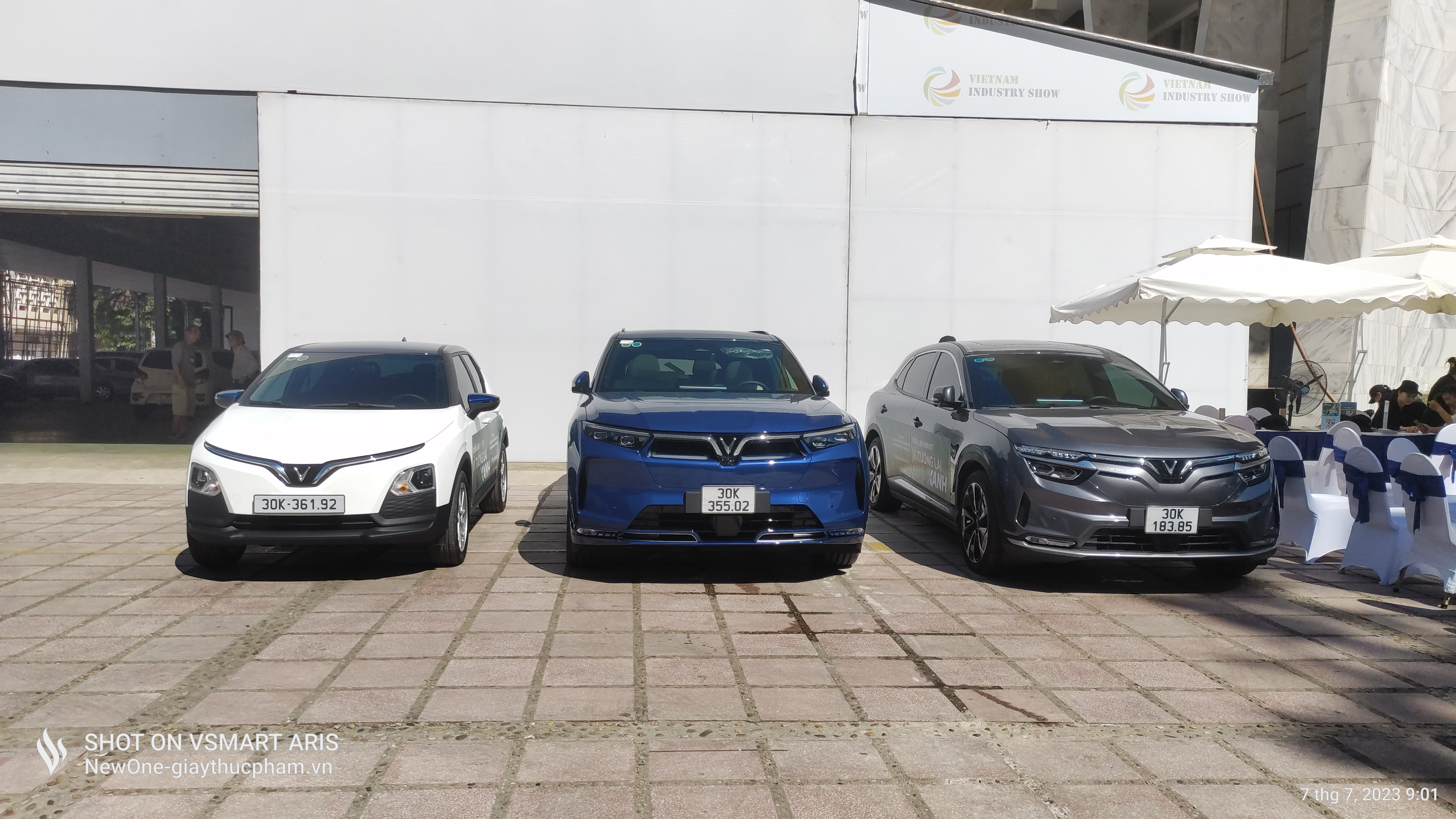
VinFast vehicles featuring the short and long white plates (2020 template)

The format for regular plates began in 1984, with a modification made in 2010 to increase registration capacity. The system itself resembles an inverted FNI system of France. The registration format of the 2010 system is 12A-345.67, where 12 is the regional code, A is the serial letter, and 345.67 is the registration number. Regular plates have black lettering on white background.

Double-letter serials for special uses also exist for regular plates:

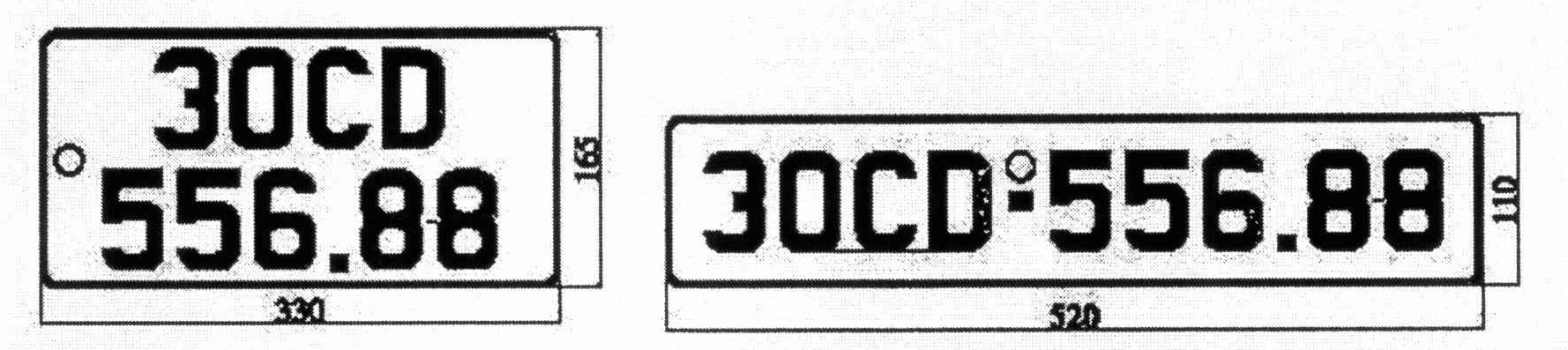
Sample template for specialized vehicles

Serial	Used for
DA	Foreign investment companies
HC	Vehicles allowed to work in limited time of day only
KT	Civilian-purposed vehicles of military enterprise
LA	Construction machinery (Note: This comes with a yellow background and follows 12AB-3456 format.)
LD	Joint ventures with foreign entities, and vehicles rented by foreigners
MA	Three-wheeled light transport vehicles
MĐ	Two-wheeled vehicles with electric power source
MK	Tractors
SA; XA	Large-size equipment, e.g. combine harvesters, etc. (Note: This also comes with a yellow background.)
TĐ	Vietnam-made vehicles
MK	Tractor
RM	Semi-trailer and semi-trailer truck

=== Other formats ===
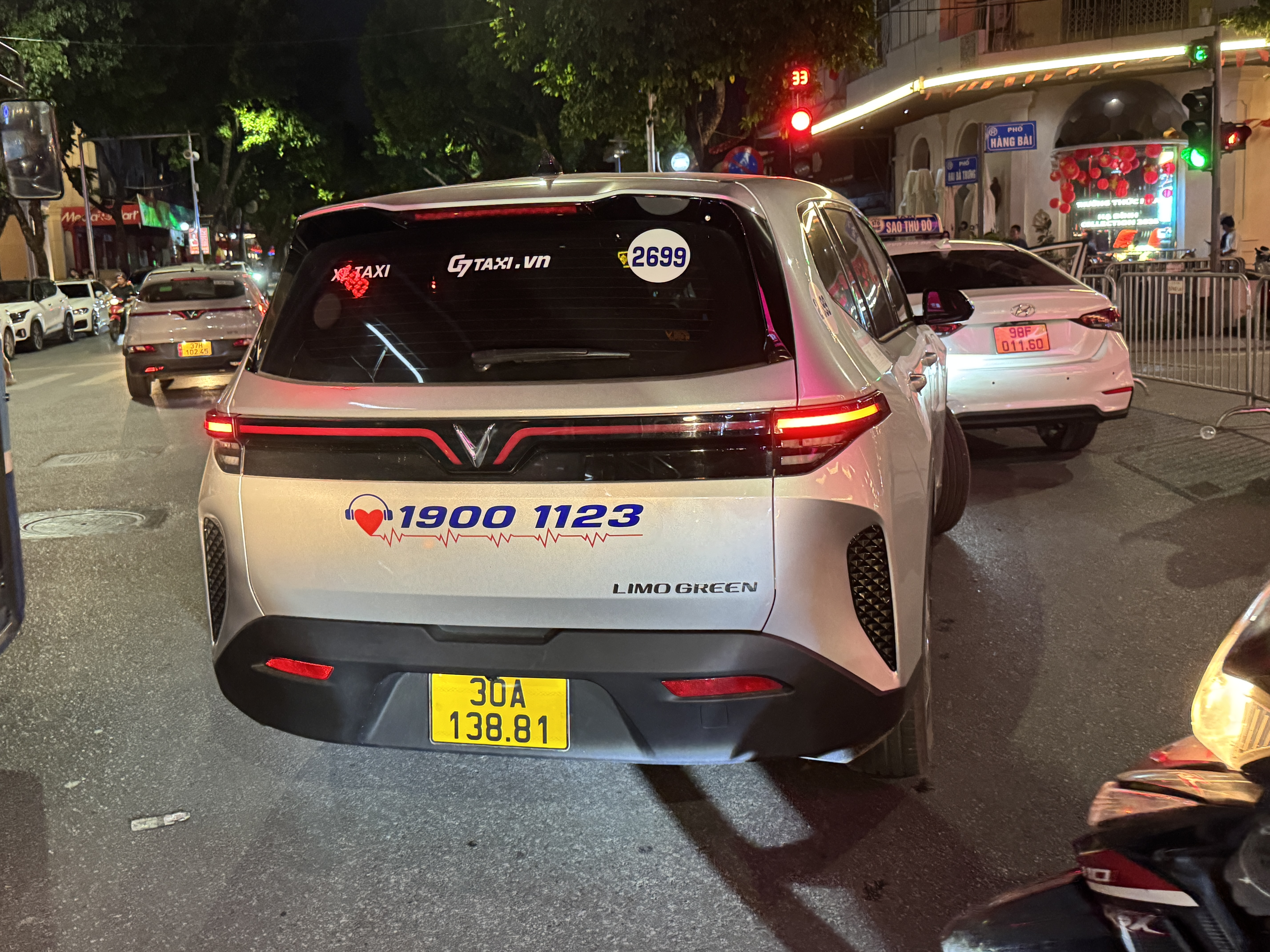
A Vietnamese taxi with short yellow plate

==== Commercial format ====
After 1 August 2020, all commercial vehicles in Vietnam must change to a yellow color vehicle plate.

NNL; N N N N	NNL; NNN.NN

NNL-N N N N
NNL-NNN.NN

==== State-owned format ====
Vehicles of state organizations receive plates with white lettering on blue backgrounds. The format is either NNL-NNN.NN or NNL-NNNN, where NN is the regional code, L is the serial, NNN.NN/NNNN is the number.

NNL; N N N N	NNL; NNN.NN

NNL-N N N N
NNL-NNN.NN

==== Motorcycles ====
Motorcycles receive two-line plates of the NN-LL/NNN.NN (or equivalently NNLL-NNN.NN on registration certificate), which replaced the previous NN-LN/NNNN and NN-LN/NNN.NN format (which are still effective in circulation), with black lettering on white backgrounds.

NN-LN; N N N N	NN-LN; NNN.NN	NN-LL; NNN.NN

Two-wheel vehicles registered before August 15, 2023, with electric power source use the NN-MĐN/NNN.NN format.

NN-MĐN
NNN.NN

==== Diplomatic plates ====
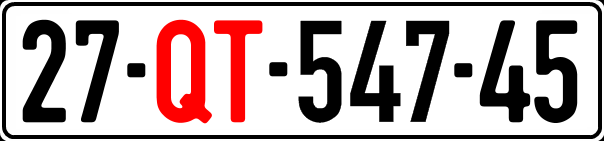
A Vietnam diplomatic plate for international organizations. The numbers 27 and 547 signifying an international organization based in Điện Biên province.

Diplomatic plates have their status codes in red, and the numbers in black on a white background.

- Diplomatic personnel based in Hanoi receive the 80-123-NG-45 format, where the red NG stood for ngoại giao, or "diplomatic", 123 being the country/organization code (e.g. 636 for South Korea), and 45 the registration the number. 01 is reserved for the head of the diplomatic mission, while the rest are given numbers from 02 to 99. Diplomatic mission based outside Hanoi received standard region codes instead of the 80 reserved for Hanoi. For example, diplomatic vehicles based in Da Nang would have a 43-123-NG-45 plate.
- International organizations based in Hanoi receive the 80-123-QT-45 format, where 80 is the code signifying national importance (i.e. being stationed in Hanoi), the red QT for quốc tế or "International", 123 the country code, and 45 the number (01 for the head of the organization, 02-99 for other members).
- International organizations based outside Hanoi receive a slightly different format of 12-QT-345-67, where 12 is the regional code, 345 being the country code, and 67 the number.

Status code	Meaning
NG (ngoại giao)	Diplomatic
NN (nước ngoài)	Foreigners without diplomatic status
QT (quốc tế)	International organizations

12-NN
345.67

12-NN-345.67

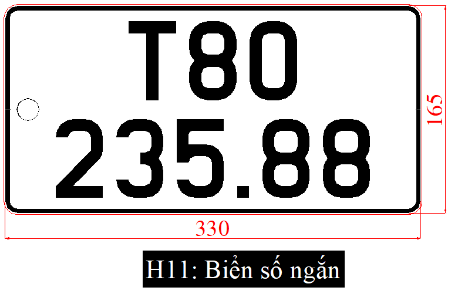
A temporary plate example. A long-plate alternative is also available and issued, makes it "T80-235.88"

==== Temporary plates ====
Temporary plates are two-line plates with the TNN-NNN.NN format, where T signifies the temporary nature of the plate, NNN.NN being the regional code and NNN.NN being the number.

Vehicle plate for military vehicle.

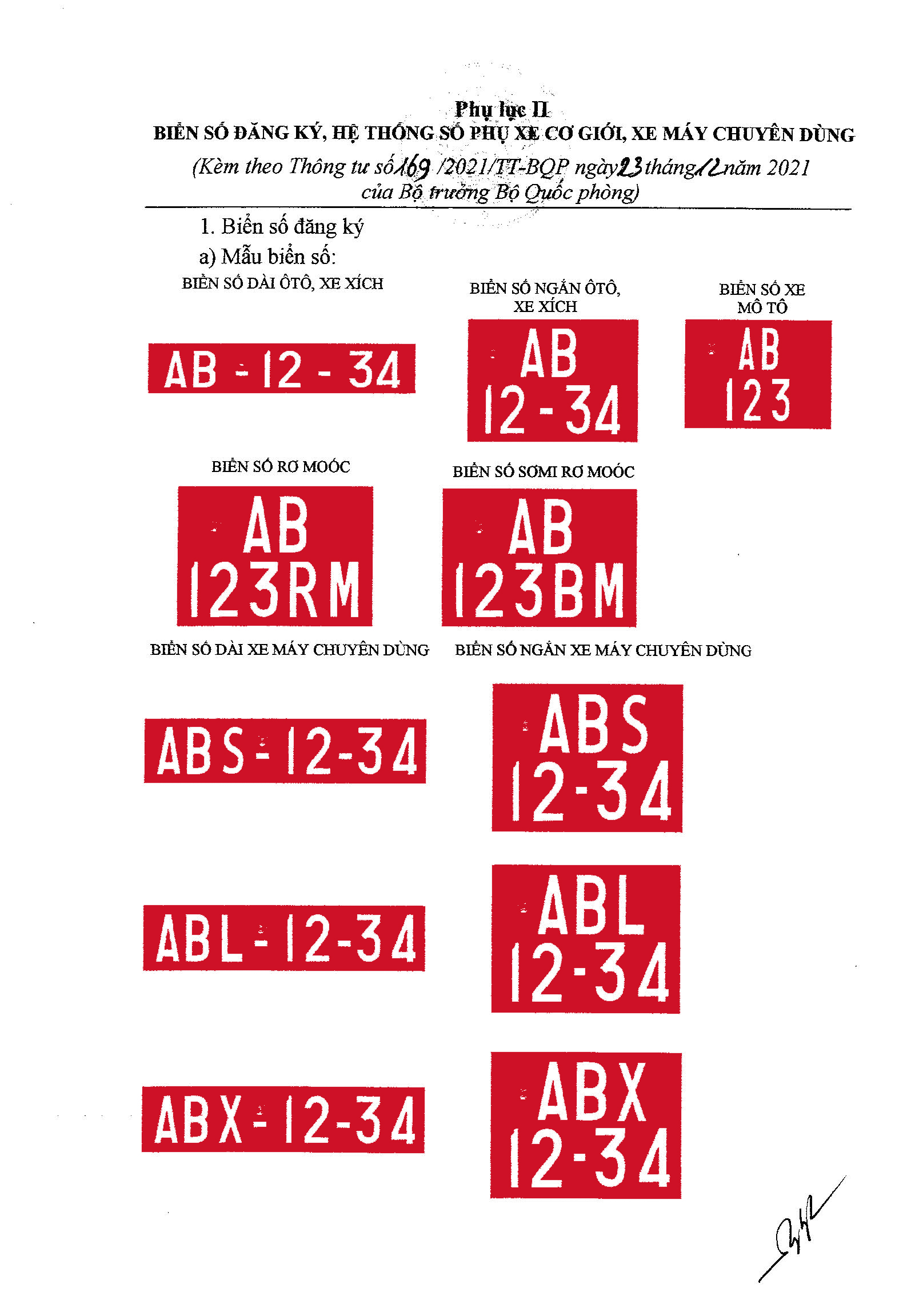
The 2021 standardized templates for Vietnamese military vehicles. The physical plate also features an inscripted Vietnam People's Army emblem on the plate.

==== Military format ====
Military vehicles bear red plates with white lettering in the format of AB-12-34, where AB is the unit code, and 12-34 being the number. Military motorcycles receive the two-line AB/123 format, where AB is the unit code, and 123 the number. Mopeds receive an additional letter A after the number.

== Codes ==
The provincial/municipal codes are listed here:

Number	Province/municipality
11	Cao Bằng
12	Lạng Sơn
14	Quảng Ninh
15, 16, 34	Hải Phòng
19, 28, 88	Phú Thọ
20, 97	Thái Nguyên
22, 23	Tuyên Quang
24, 21	Lào Cai
25	Lai Châu
26	Sơn La
27	Điện Biên
29–33, 40	Hà Nội
35, 18, 90	Ninh Bình

Number	Province/municipality
36	Thanh Hóa
37	Nghệ An
38	Hà Tĩnh
39, 60, 93	Đồng Nai
41, 50–59, 61, 72	Hồ Chí Minh City
43, 92	Đà Nẵng
47, 78	Đắk Lắk
49, 48, 86	Lâm Đồng
64, 71, 84	Vĩnh Long
65, 83, 95	Cần Thơ
66, 63	Đồng Tháp
67, 68	An Giang

Number	Province/municipality
69, 94	Cà Mau
70, 62	Tây Ninh
74, 73	Quảng Trị
75	Huế
76, 82	Quảng Ngãi
79, 85	Khánh Hòa
80	National Authorities (Government, CPV CC,...), President and Vietnam People's Public Security*
81, 77	Gia Lai
89, 17	Hưng Yên
99, 98	Bắc Ninh

* Note 1: These agencies also use regularly licensed vehicles

== Foreign Countries Codes ==
Country Code (Organization)	County (Organization)
001-005	Austria
006-010	Albania
011-015	United Kingdom
016-020	Egypt
021-025	Azerbaijan
026-030	India
031-035	Angola
036-040	I.R. Afghanistan
041-045	Algeria
046-050	Argentina
051-055	Armenia
056-060	Iceland
061-065	Belgium
066-070	Poland
071-075	Portugal
076-080	Bulgaria
081-085	Burkina Faso
086-090	Brazil
091-095	Bangladesh
096-100	Belarus
101-105	Bolivia
106-110	Benin
111-115	Brunei
116-120	Burundi
121-125	Cuba
126-130	Ivory Coast
131-135	Congo-Brazzaville
136-140	Congo-Kinshasa
141-145	Chile
146-150	Colombia
151-155	Cameroon
156-160	Canada
161-165	Kuwait
166-170	Cambodia
171-175	Kyrgyzstan
176-180	Qatar
181-185	Cape Verde
186-190	Costa Rica
191-195	Germany
196-200	Zambia
201-205	Zimbabwe
206-210	Denmark
211-215	Ecuador
216-220	Eritrea
221-225	Ethiopia
226-230	Estonia
231-235	Guyana
236-240	Gabon
241-245	The Gambia
246-250	Djibouti
251-255	Georgia
256-260	Jordan
261-265	Guinea
266-270	Ghana
271-275	Guinea-Bissau
276-280	Grenada
281-285	Equatorial Guinea
286-290	Guatemala
291-295	Hungary
296-300, 771-775	United States
301-305	Netherlands
306-310	Greece
311-315	Jamaica
316-320	Indonesia
321-325	Iran
326-330	Iraq
331-335	Italy
336-340	Israel
341-345	Kazakhstan
346-350	Laos
351-355	Lebanon
356-360	Libya
361-365	Luxembourg
366-370	Lithuania
371-375	Latvia
376-380	Myanmar
381-385	Mongolia
386-390	Mozambique
391-395	Madagascar
396-400	Moldova
401-405	Maldives
406-410	Mexico
411-415	Mali
416-420	Malaysia
421-425	Morocco
426-430	Mauritania
431-435	Malta
436-440	Marshall Islands
441-445	Russia
446-450, 776-780	Japan
451-455	Nicaragua
456-460	New Zealand
461-465	Niger
466-470	Nigeria
471-475	Namibia
476-480	Nepal
481-485	South Africa
486-490	Yugoslavia
491-495	Norway
496-500	Oman
501-505	Australia
506-510	France
511-515	Fiji
516-520	Pakistan
521-525	Finland
526-530	Philippines
531-535	Palestine
536-540	Panama
541-545	Papua New Guinea
546-550	International Organizations
551-555	Rwanda
556-560	Romania
561-565	Chad
566-570	Czech Republic
571-575	Cyprus
576-580	Spain
581-585	Sweden
586-590	Tanzania
591-595	Togo
596-600	Tajikistan
601-605	China
606-610	Thailand
611-615	Turkmenistan
616-620	Tunisia
621-625	Turkey
626-630	Switzerland
631-635	DPR Korea
636-640	Korea (ROK)
641-645	United Arab Emirates
646-650	Samoa
651-655	Ukraine
656-660	Uzbekistan
661-665	Uganda
666-670	Uruguay
671-675	Vanuatu
676-680	Venezuela
681-685	Sudan
686-690	Sierra Leone
691-695	Singapore
696-700	Sri Lanka
701-705	Somalia
706-710	Senegal
711-715	Syria
716-720	Sahrawi
721-725	Seychelles
726-730	São Tomé and Príncipe
731-735	Slovakia
736-740	Yemen
741-745	Liechtenstein
746-750	Hong Kong
751-755	East Timor
756-760	European Union
761-765	Saudi Arabia
766-770	Liberia
781-785	Haiti
786-790	Peru
791	Andorra
792	Anguilla
793	Antigua and Barbuda
794	Bahamas
795	Bahrain
796	Barbados
797	Belize
798	Bermuda
799	Bhutan
800	Bosnia and Herzegovina
801-805	Ireland
806	Kenya
807	Botswana
808	Comoros
809	Dominican Republic
810	North Macedonia
811	Central African Republic
812	Croatia
813	Curaçao
814	Dominica
815	El Salvador
816	Honduras
817	Kiribati
818	Lesotho
819	Micronesia
820	Malawi
821	Mauritius
822	Monaco
823	Montenegro
824	South Sudan
825	Nauru
826	Niue
827	Palau
828	Paraguay
829	Cook Islands
830	Puerto Rico
831	Northern Mariana Islands
832	Solomon Islands
833	Saint Kitts and Nevis
834	Saint Lucia
835	Saint Vincent and the Grenadines
836	San Marino
837	Slovenia
838	Suriname
839	Eswatini
840	Tonga
841	Trinidad and Tobago
842	Tuvalu
843	Holy See
885-890	Chinese Taipei
