= Yên Mỹ =

- Commune
- Yên Mỹ Roundabout in the center of Yên Mỹ Commune
- Interactive map of Yên Mỹ
- Coordinates: 20°52′54″N 106°3′19″E
- Country: Vietnam
- Region: Red River Delta
- Province: Hưng Yên province
- Established: 16 June 2025

Area
  - Total: 33.12 km^{2} (12.79 sq mi)

Population (2025)
  - Total: 75,876
  - Density: 2,290/km^{2} (5,900/sq mi)

Yên Mỹ is a commune in Hưng Yên province, Vietnam. The commune inherited its name from Yên Mỹ township and the former Yên Mỹ district.

== History ==
The area of present-day Yên Mỹ Commune was formerly part of Yên Mỹ district in Hưng Yên province.

On 16 June 2025, the National Assembly of Vietnam adopted Resolution No. 203/2025/QH15 amending and supplementing several articles of the Constitution of the Socialist Republic of Vietnam, effective on the same date. Under the resolution, district-level administrative units nationwide ceased to operate from 1 July 2025.

The Standing Committee of the National Assembly of Vietnam issued Resolution No. 1666/NQ-UBTVQH15 on the arrangement of commune-level administrative units in Hưng Yên province in 2025, effective from 16 June 2025. Under the resolution, the entire area and population of Yên Mỹ township and Tân Lập, Trung Hòa, and Tân Minh communes, formerly part of Yên Mỹ district, were merged to form a new commune named Yên Mỹ.
