= Tiên Lữ district =

Tiên Lữ district Huyện Tiên Lữ Tiên Hoa huyện
- Rural district
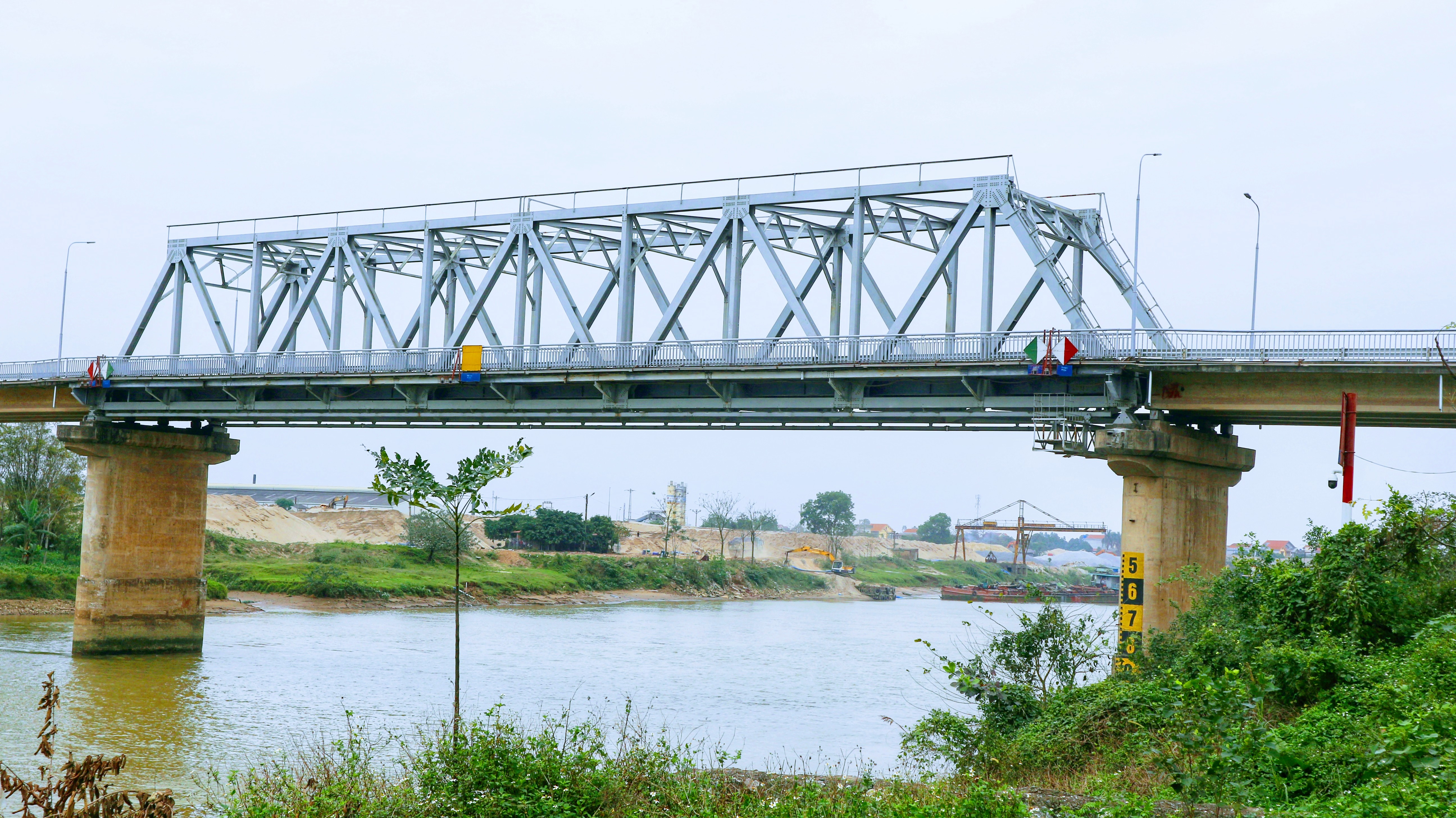
- Triều Dương Bridge over the Luộc River, what connects Hưng Yên to Thái Bình.
- Interactive map of Tiên Lữ district
- Coordinates: 20°42′03″N 106°07′06″E
- Country: Vietnam
- Region: Red River Delta
- Province: Hưng Yên
- Existence: 1428 (?) to August 30, 2025
- Central hall: Vương township

Government
  - Type: Rural district
  - People Committee's Chairman: Nguyễn Thị Bích Hường
  - People Council's Chairman: Doãn Anh Quân
  - Front Committee's Chairman: Nguyễn Văn Huyên
  - Party Committee's Secretary: Nguyễn Văn Thơ

Area
  - Rural district: 78.57 km^{2} (30.34 sq mi)

Population (2020)
  - Rural district: 93,554
  - Density: 1,191/km^{2} (3,080/sq mi)
  - Urban: 5,383
  - Metro: 88,171
  - Ethnicities: Kinh; Tanka
- Time zone: UTC+7 (Indochina Time)
- ZIP code: 17310
- Website: Tienlu.Hungyen.gov.vn; Tienlu.Hungyen.dcs.vn

Tiên Lữ [tiən˧˧:lɨʔɨ˧˥] is a former rural district of Hưng Yên province in the Red River Delta region of Vietnam.

== History ==
=== Middle Ages ===
According to scholars Philippe Papin and Keith Weller Taylor, until before the 13th century, the domains in the East of Thăng Long were most forests or swamps, thus they were very rugged with insignificant population density. That natural condition has helped the capital to be protected, but it also became an obstacle for exploitation.

According to Đại Việt sử ký toàn thư, when Prince Ngô Quyền was on his way to fight the Naam-hon forces on Bạch Đằng River, he stopped at Đằng canton (Đằng châu), and when he returned, he named this place as Mạc Liên (幕連). However, this was not its official name. The Ngô Dynasty established Cư Liên rural district (Note: By ideas of researchers Tạ Chí Đại Trường and Nguyễn Hùng Vỹ, words "cửu-diên", "cửu-liên" or "mạc-liên" are the Hanese ways of the phonetic for "k'len", "t'len" or "sen" (originated from Sanskrit "kamala" कमल) in ancient Annamese language, which mean "lotus [bund]".) (居連縣, Cư Liên huyện) belonging to Đằng canton. During the Early Lê Dynasty, it was part of Khoái garrison (Khoái lộ).

The Lý Dynasty has made an effort to establish an administrative unit called as Khoái Châu garrison (Khoái Châu lộ), which was military defense. Its range was almost corresponding to the modern Hưng Yên province. However, its entire area was still in a deserted situation.

About the 2nd year of Nguyên Phong (1252), there was a decree to establish Tiên Hoa rural district (仙花縣, Tiên Hoa huyện) belonging to Khoái Châu prefecture (Khoái Châu phủ). The origin of this name was not unknown, but by the time of the Later Lê Dynasty, it was changed to Tiên Lữ rural district (仙侶縣, Tiên Lữ huyện). Until the 10th year of Quang Thuận (1469), it was officially part of Sơn Nam garrison (Sơn Nam trấn).

In the 2nd year of Cảnh Hưng (1741), Tiên Lữ belonged to Khoái Châu prefecture of Sơn Nam Thượng garrison (Sơn Nam Thượng lộ).

In 1831, Emperor Minh Mệnh of the Nguyễn Dynasty issued a decree to abolish the "trấn" regulation. Accordingly, Tiên Lữ belonged to Tiên Hưng prefecture of Hưng Yên province.

About the 6th year of Thành Thái (1894), Tiên Lữ and Phù Cừ were re-merged to Khoái Châu prefecture (Khoái Châu phủ).

=== 20th century ===
Under the French provisional military government in Tonkin about early 1947, the "phủ" regulation was officially abolished. Tiên Lữ rural district has been changed to Tiên Lữ district (仙侶郡, quận Tiên Lữ) and it has become one of nine districts of Hưng Yên province. Until the Government of the Democratic Republic of Vietnam was re-established in the North Vietnam (1955), the "huyện" regulation was restored.

On January 27, 1968, according to the resolution of the 3rd North Vietnam National Assembly, two provinces Hải Dương and Hưng Yên were merged to become Hải Hưng province. Thus, Tiên Lữ rural district belonged to Hải Hưng.

On March 11, 1977, the Council of Ministers issued Decision 58-CP on the consolidation of some rural districts of Hải Hưng province. In particular, two districts Phù Cừ and Tiên Lữ were merged into Phù Tiên rural district (芙仙縣, huyện Phù Tiên).

On November 6, 1996, the Vietnam National Assembly issued the Resolution on the division and adjustment of administrative boundaries in some provinces. Accordingly, Hải Hưng has been split into two new provinces of Hải Dương and Hưng Yên. Therefore, Phù Tiên belonged to Hưng Yên province.

On February 24, 1997, the Government of Vietnam issued Decree 17-CP on the division of Phù Tiên rural district into new districts Phù Cừ and Tiên Lữ.

=== 21st century ===
During the period from 2003 to 2024, the Government of Vietnam had three separations of Tiên Lữ rural district to supplement the area for Hưng Yên town, which was upgraded to the city (grade III municipality, đô thị loại III) in 2007.

== Geography ==
=== Topography ===
According to the 2021 statistical yearbook of the whole Hưng Yên province, Tiên Lữ rural district covers an area of 92 km^{2}. Currently, it has all 11 commune-level administrative units.

- 1 municipality : Vương township (capital).
- 10 communes : An Viên, Cương Chính, Hải Thắng, Hưng Đạo, Lệ Xá, Nhật Tân, Thiện Phiến, Thủ Sỹ, Thụy Lôi, Trung Dũng.

The rural district has a shape similar to a triangle with a relatively flat terrain. However, many places are still lower than the sea level, therefore, they are very pleasant to adversely affected by annual floods. The district is also the intersection of two national routes of 38B, 39A and 200.

Luộc River is the largest and most basic source of water in the whole district. In addition, its South has a small branch of the Hồng River, but this position is only convenient for waterway traffic.

=== Population ===
As of 2021 Tiên Lữ rural district had a population of 93,554. Besides, the population of the whole rural district is fully registered as Kinh people.

There are only one parish in the domain of Tiên Lữ rural district, where has welcomed the Gospel in 1860, called as Thụy Lôi (or Xuôi), with about 870 parishers. It is part of the Đông Hưng Yên Deanery, belonging to the Thái Bình Cathedral Diocese. Its patron saint was chosen as Saint Peter the Apostle. The current priest is Bishop Joseph Phạm Văn Thao, who was ordained on December 8, 2022.

== Culture ==
According to Đại Việt thông sử and Đại Việt sử ký tiền biên, Doãn clan in Phương Chiểu commune are descended from General Doãn Nỗ, whom was ranked among the 51 meritorious officials of Emperor Lê Thái Tổ. His temple was built in the 15th century and it is also recognized as a special cultural relic of the whole Tiên Lữ rural district.

== Economy ==
Due to the fact that the location is not too complicated and it has a large groundwater system, over the centuries, Tiên Lữ rural district is the intensive rice cultivation zone in the top of the Northern Vietnam. However, although the annual rice yield is often very high, the income of farmers is low.

During the COVID-19 pandemic, the textile factories in Tiên Lữ suddenly became known for providing an average of nearly 1 million masks each month for the whole country. Especially in the serious context of the shortage of masks for many places was affected by the disease.

After the pandemic ended basically, the People's Committee and Council actively proposed a number of measures to stimulate production and consumption in the vision from 2025 to 2035.

== See also ==
- Hưng Yên city
- Hưng Hà district
- Phù Cừ district
