= Sóc Sơn district =

Sóc Sơn district Huyện Sóc Sơn
- District
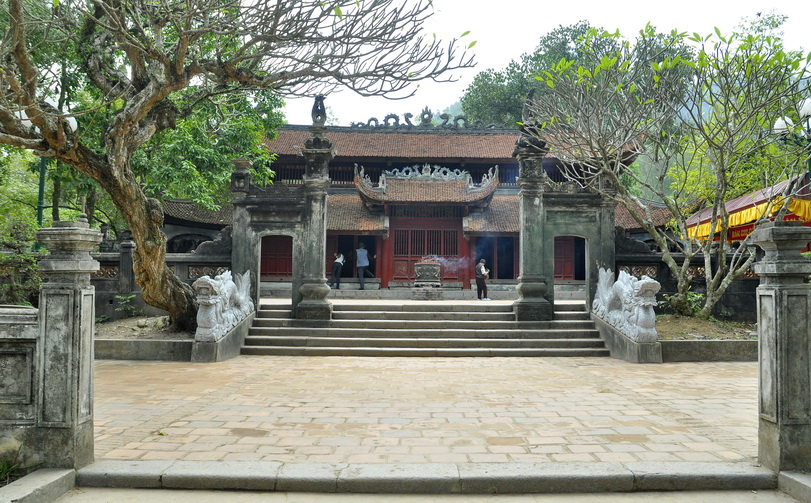
- Sóc Sơn temple
- Interactive map of Sóc Sơn district
- Coordinates: 21°15′14″N 105°50′58″E
- Country: Vietnam
- Region: Red River Delta
- Municipality: Hanoi
- Capital: Sóc Sơn
- Time zone: UTC+7 (Indochina Time)

Sóc Sơn is a former district (huyện) of Hanoi, the capital city of Vietnam. Nội Bài International Airport is located in this district.

Sóc Sơn district was bordered by the provinces of Bắc Giang and Bắc Ninh to the east, Vĩnh Phúc province to the west, Mê Linh district to the southwest, Đông Anh district to the south and Thái Nguyên province to the north.

The district was subdivided to 26 commune-level subdivisions, including the township of Sóc Sơn (district capital) and the rural communes of Bắc Phú, Bắc Sơn, Đông Xuân, Đức Hòa, Hiền Ninh, Hồng Kỳ, Kim Lũ, Mai Đình, Minh Phú, Minh Trí, Nam Sơn, Phú Cường, Phù Linh, Phù Lỗ, Phú Minh, Quang Tiến, Tân Dân, Tân Hưng, Tân Minh, Thanh Xuân, Tiên Dược, Trung Giã, Việt Long, Xuân Giang, Xuân Thu.

== Landmarks ==
The district is home to the Sóc Sơn temple, a temple notably celebrated as a stopping point in the Gióng Festival.
