= Gióng Festival =

Festival in Hanoi, Vietnam

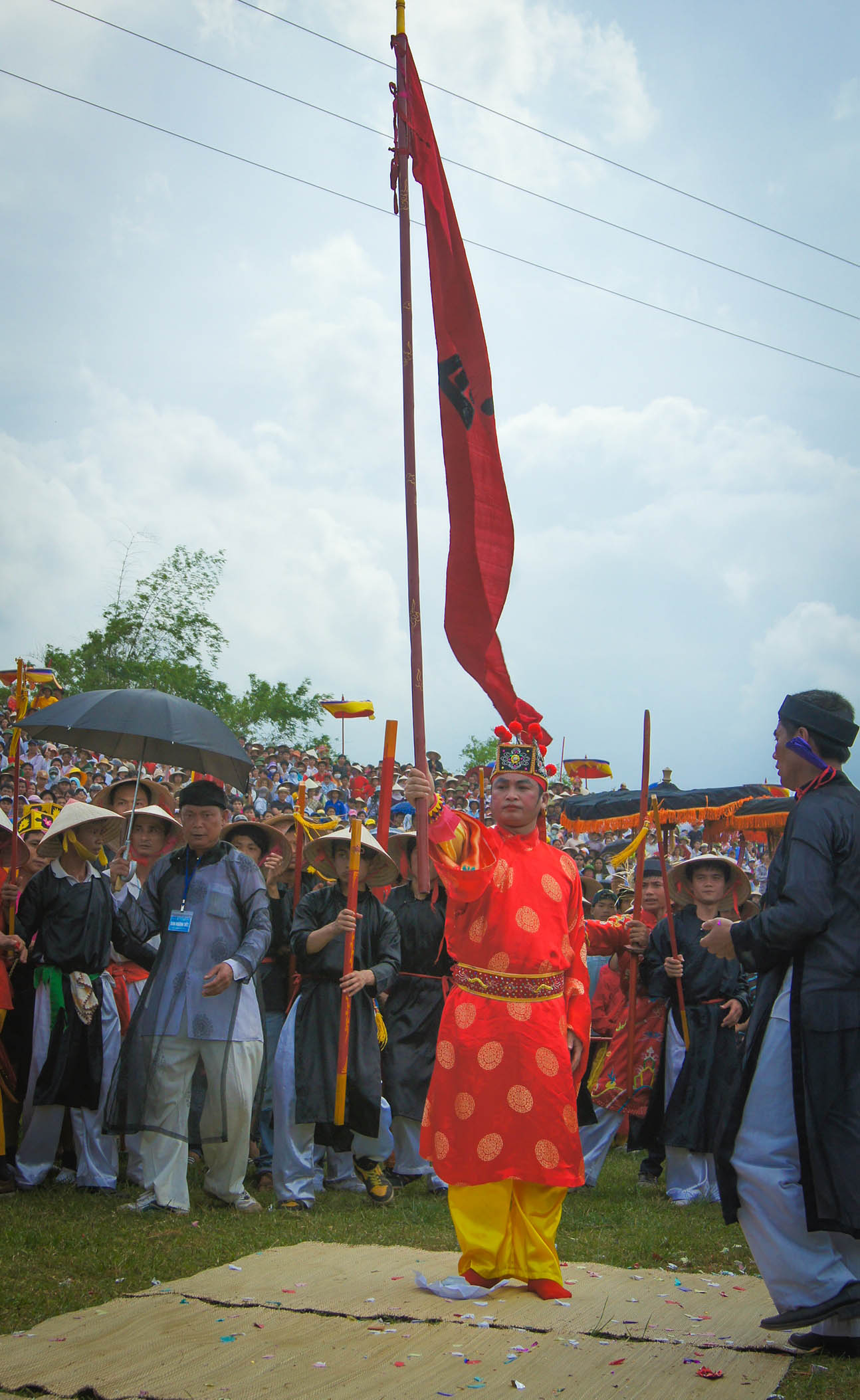
Flag dancing in Gióng Festival

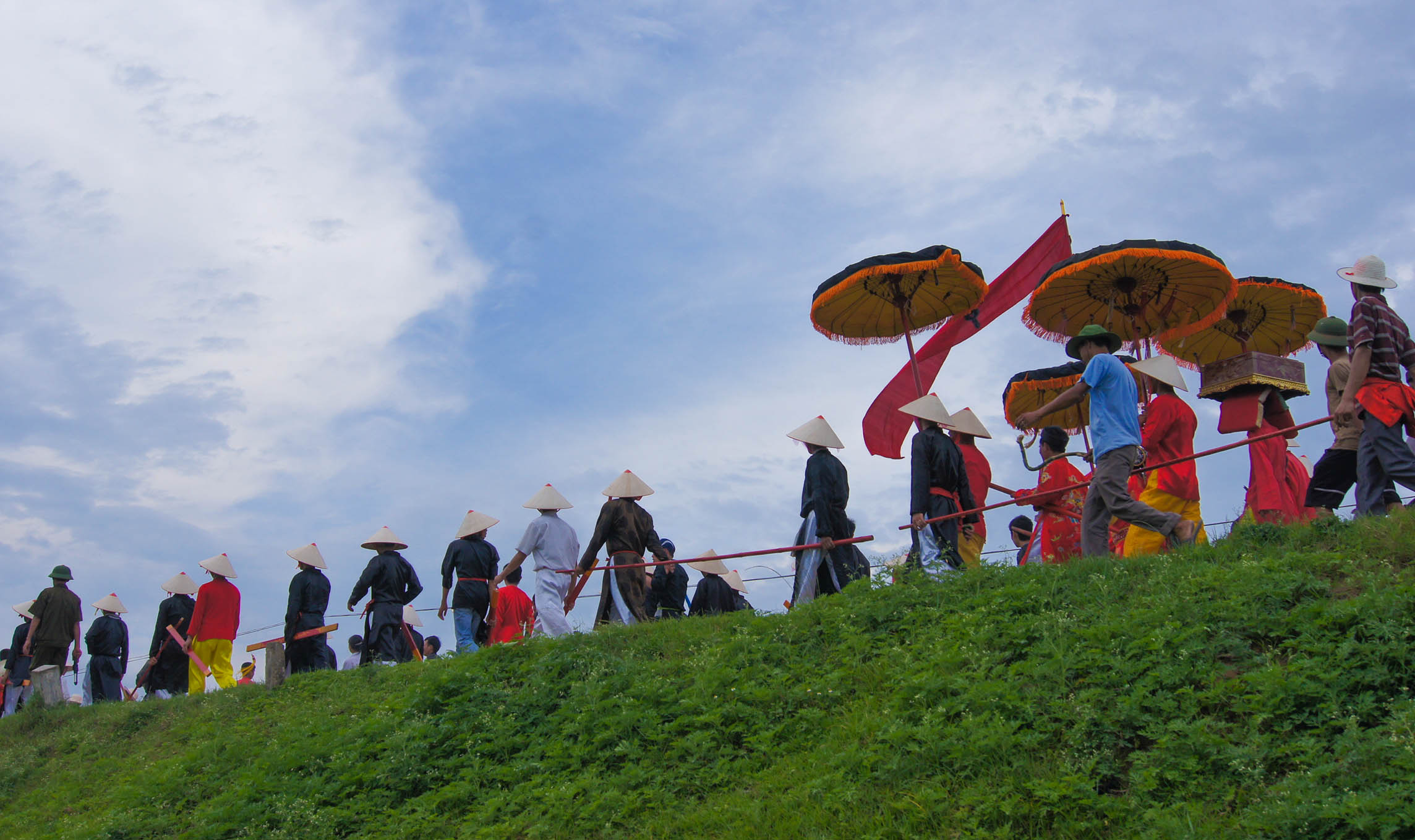
Thánh Gióng palanquin procession in Gióng Festival

Gióng Festival (Vietnamese: Hội Gióng) is a traditional festival which is celebrated annually in many parts of Hanoi to honour the mythical hero, Thánh Gióng, who is credited with defending the country against foreign enemies. The festival was listed on the UNESCO List of the Intangible Cultural Heritage.
