= Hưng Yên province =

- Province
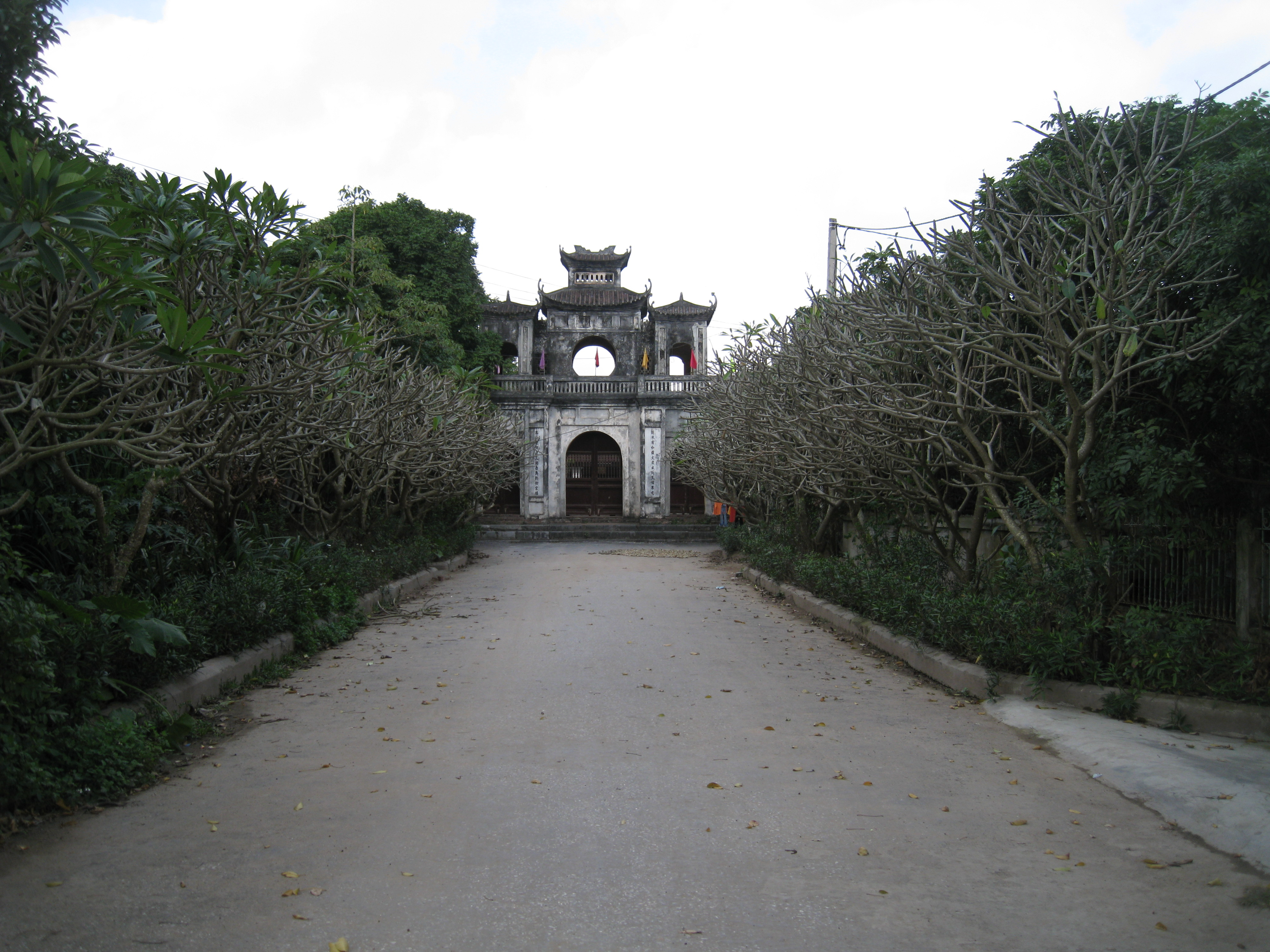
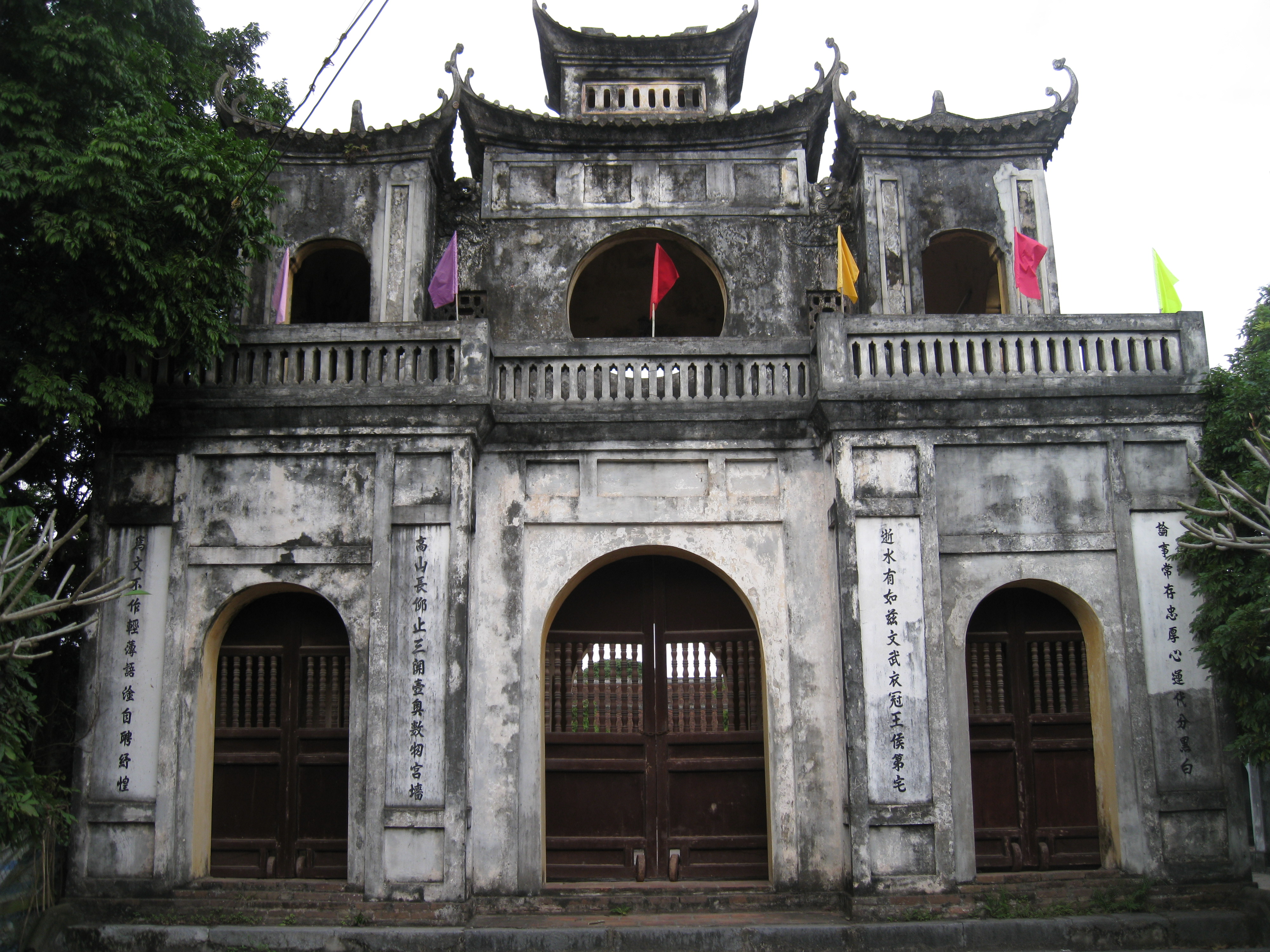
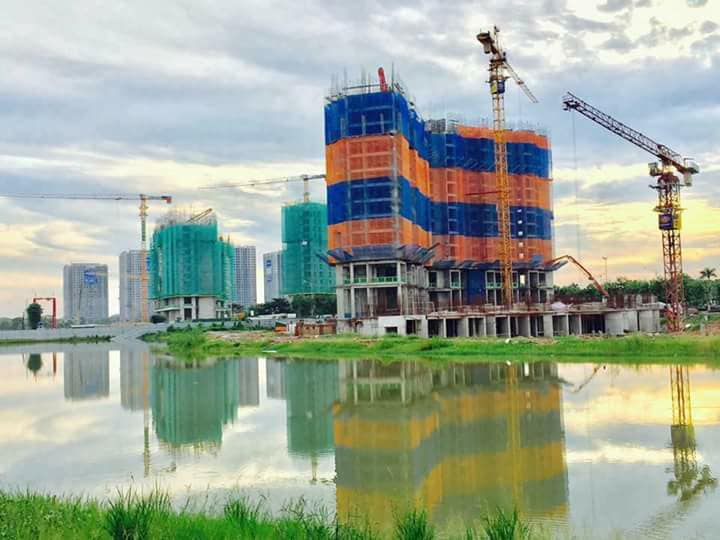
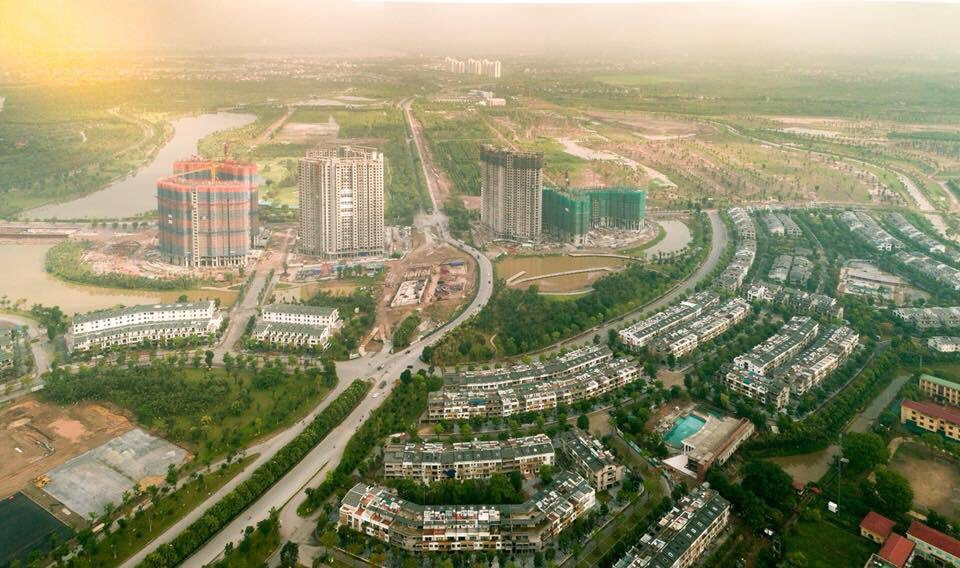
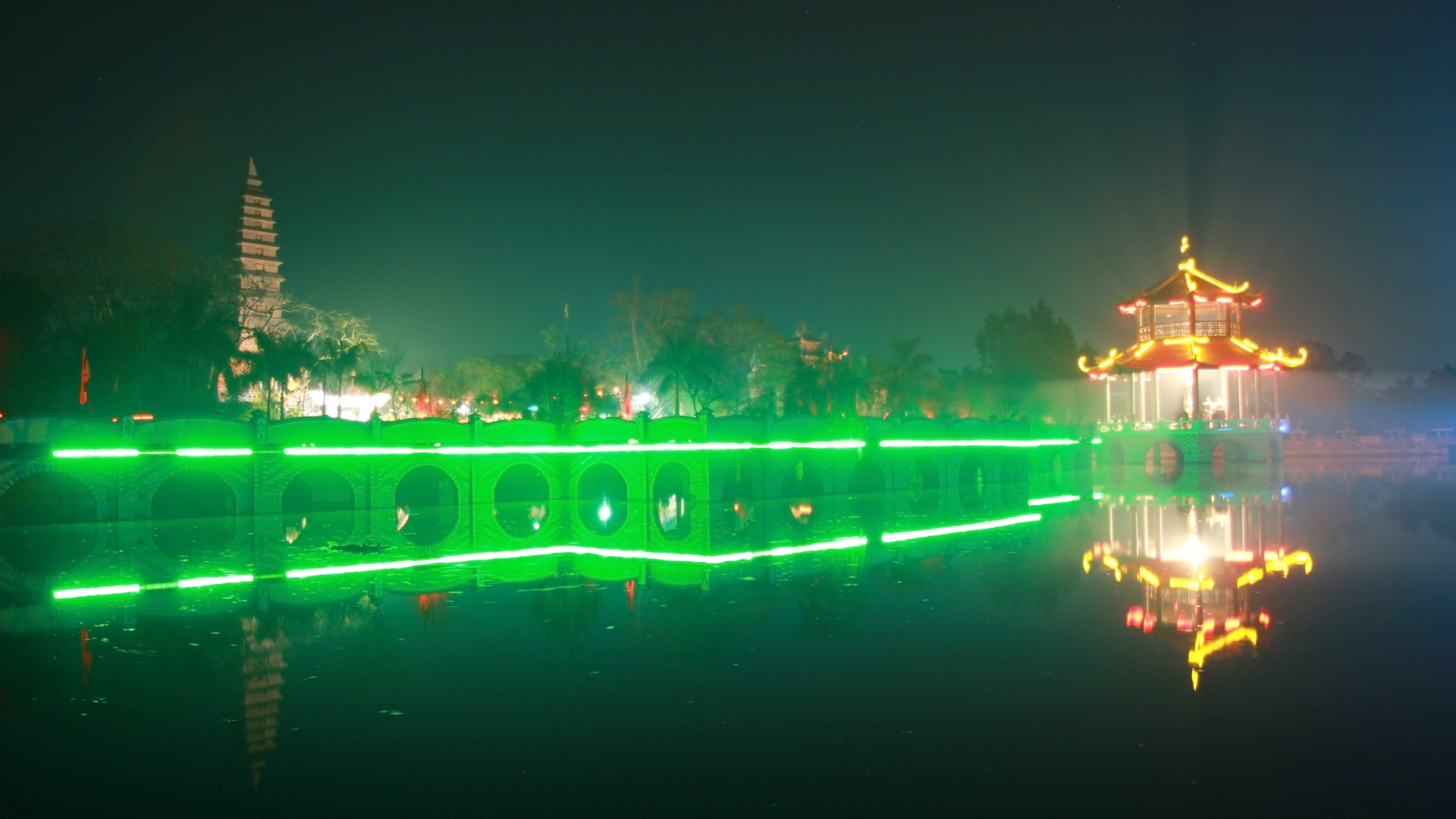
- Some typical locations.

- Seal
- Nickname: "Hiến Street" (Phố Hiến)
- Motto: "Charm From Viet Spirit" (Nét duyên hồn Việt)
- Location of Hưng Yên within Vietnam
- Interactive map of Hưng Yên province
- Coordinates: 20°50′N 106°5′E
- Country: Vietnam
- Region: Red River Delta
- Central hall: No.10, Chùa Chuông road, Phố Hiến ward
- Subdivision: 11 wards, 93 communes

Government
  - Type: Provincial People's Committee
  - Body: Provincial People's Council
  - People Council's Chairman: Trần Quốc Văn
  - People Committee's Chairman: Trần Quốc Toản

Area
  - Total: 2,514.81 km^{2} (970.97 sq mi)

Population (2025)
  - Total: 3,567,943
  - Density: 1,418.77/km^{2} (3,674.60/sq mi)

Ethnic groups
  - Kinh: 99.15%
  - Tày: 0.23%
  - Thái: 0.23%
  - Mường: 0.2%
  - Others: 0.2%

GDP
  - Province: VND 65.746 trillion US$ 2.855 billion
- Time zone: UTC+07:00 (ICT)
- Area codes: 221
- ISO 3166 code: VN-66
- License plate: 89
- HDI (2020): ▲0.768 (10th)
- Climate: Cwa
- Website: Hungyen.gov.vn; Hungyen.dcs.vn

Hưng Yên (Vietnamese pronunciation: [hɯ̄ŋ iə̄n]) is a province in the Red River Delta of Northern Vietnam. It is located in the heart of the delta region, bordering Hanoi to the west and northwest, Bắc Ninh to the north, Haiphong to the east, and Ninh Bình to the south.

== History ==
=== Dynasties ===
Under the Ngô dynasty, the area of the province of Hưng Yên was called Dang Chau. It was then renamed Thái Bình prefecture under the Early Lê dynasty, Dang Chau and Khoái Châu phủ under the Lý dynasty and Long Hưng garrison and Khoái lo under the Trần Dynasty. Under the Later Lê dynasty, Hưng Yên belonged to Sơn Nam and then divided into Sơn Nam Thượng and Sơn Nam Hạ garrisons.

The Nguyễn dynasty implemented administrative reforms in 1831 to dismantle the trấn administrative units and establish provinces. Five districts of Đông Yên, Kim Động, Thiên Thi, Phù Cừ and Tiên Lữ were separated from Khoái Châu phủ of Sơn Nam Thượng trấn and three districts of Thần Khê, Hưng Nhân and Duyên Hà were separated from Tiên Hưng phủ of Nam Định trấn of lower Sơn Nam town to establish Hưng Yên Province. The initial centre of the province was located in An Vu and Luong Dien communes and then moved to Nhi Tan of Xích Đằng commune.

This area has communes and markets lying side by side, enabling trading activities to be busier and busier. The Chronicle of Hưng Yên Province stated: "The streets are very busy and bustle, crowded with vehicles; the old images of Phổ Hiến in Sơn Nam can be seen now in this land".

The name Hưng Yên officially appeared in the directory of the country in 1831. For that reason, prior to the French occupation of Vietnam, Hưng Yên was a province located on both sides of the Luộc River.

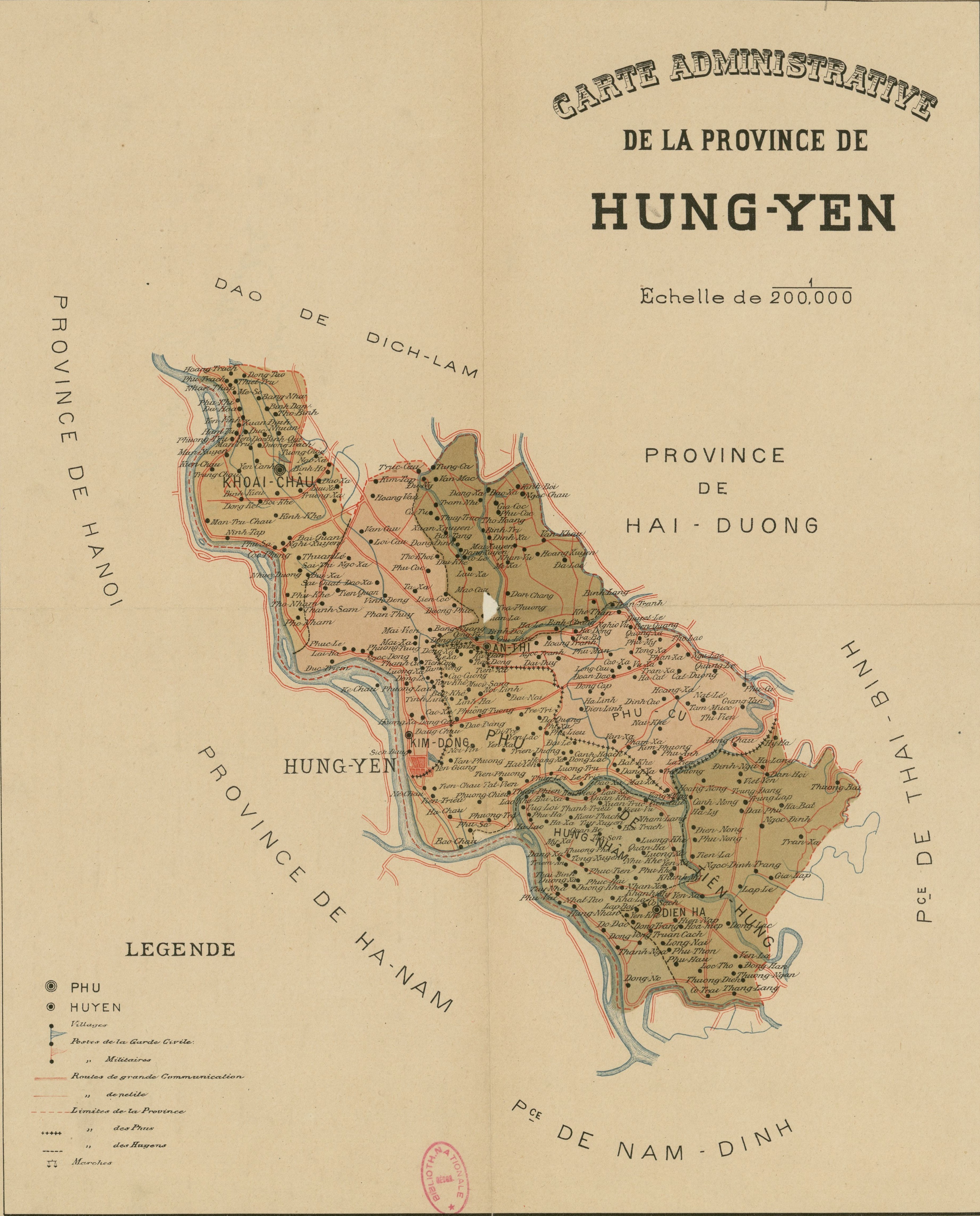
Map of Hưng Yên province in 1891

On March 27, 1833, French troops led by Captain Henri Rivière moved along the Red River from Hanoi and defeated Nam Định citadel. He then demanded Sub lieutenant Edgard de Trentinian to lead a unit of troops to attack Hưng Yên citadel. After occupying Hưng Yên, they made efforts to strengthen their puppet government and establish troop stations on one hand, while speeding up the measuring and mapping work for deep involvement into communes and hamlets.

In 1890, the French set up the Bãi Sậy area consisting of Yên Mỹ, Yen Hao, Văn Lâm and Cam Luong districts for the purpose of easier suppression of revolts. After the failure of the Bãi Sậy rebellion, they merged Van Lam, Yên Mỹ and Yen Hao districts into Hưng Yên province and returned Cam Luong district. In the same year, the French split Thần Khê district from Tiên Hưng phủ of Hưng Yên province and Thái Bình phủ and Kiến Xương phủ from Nam Định province and set up a new province called Thái Bình. Afterwards, they went on to cut Hưng Nhân and Duyen Ha districts and transferred Tiên Lữ district (formerly belonging to Tiên Hưng) to merge into Khoái Châu phủ. Ever since, the Luộc River has served as the natural border between Hưng Yên and Thái Bình. This period lasted from French colonization to the August Revolution in 1945.

During the independent advocacy movement for Vietnamese people, while Hải Dương and Hải Phòng were considered as the bases of Vietnam Nationalist Party and Daiviet Nationalist Party, Hưng Yên was like the area of Việt Minh forces. Communists have continued to take advantage of the low humid terrain of Mỹ Hào district to operate secretly.

=== Democratic Republic of Vietnam ===
Bần Yên Nhân township (thị trấn Bần Yên Nhân) and its surrounding areas were almost placed in a curfew situation because of motor vehicle ambushes by Việt Minh guerrilla groups, when the Indochina War broke out.

After war, when peace was restored in the North, district-level administrative units remained unchanged, except the changes in the administrative names of some wards and communes.

On January 26, 1968, the Standing Committee of the Vietnam National Assembly approved a resolution on the unification of Hải Dương and Hưng Yên into Hải Hưng province. After that, on March 11, 1977, Văn Giang and Yên Mỹ districts were unified into Văn Yên district; Tiên Lữ and Phù Cừ districts were unified into Phù Tiên district; Văn Lâm and Mỹ Hào districts were unified into Văn Mỹ.

=== Socialist Republic of Vietnam ===
On February 24, 1979, Kim Động and Ân Thi districts were unified into Kim Thi district. Văn Yên and Văn Mỹ districts were unified into Mỹ Văn; Khoái Châu district and a part of Văn Giang district were unified into Châu Giang district.

On November 6, 1996, the National Assembly approved the division of Hải Hưng into Hải Dương and Hưng Yên. After that, the unified districts were split as the former administrative units.

On June 12, 2025, the National Assembly passed Resolution No. 202/2025/QH15, which took effect the same day, merging Thái Bình province into Hưng Yên Province.

== Geography ==
Hưng Yên province covers an area of 930.20 km^{2} (359.15 mi^{2}), comprising one city, eight rural districts, and one district-leveled town, it had a population of 1,290,850 in 2022 with 250,000 people in urban areas and 1,040,850 people in rural areas. The province is a settlement along the banks of the Red River.

The population of Hưng Yên is fully registered as Kinh people.

From 2024, the province is subdivided into 10 district-level sub-divisions, which are further subdivided into 161 commune-level sub-divisions.

Subdivisions of Hưng Yên

Name	Population	Commune-level sub-divisions
City (1)
Hưng Yên	116,356	7 wards, 10 communes
District-level town (1)
Mỹ Hào	112,793	7 wards, 6 communes
Rural districts (8)
Ân Thi	134,403	1 town, 20 communes
Khoái Châu	188,802	1 town, 24 communes

Name	Population	Commune-level sub-divisions
Kim Động	117,734	1 town, 16 communes
Phù Cừ	89,954	1 town, 13 communes
Tiên Lữ	93,118	1 town, 14 communes
Văn Giang	120,799	1 town, 10 communes
Văn Lâm	133,027	1 town, 10 communes
Yên Mỹ	156,333	1 town, 16 communes

=== Climate ===
Similar to other provinces in the Red River Delta, Hưng Yên is affected by the hot and damp tropical monsoon climate. Every year, there are two separate hot and cold seasons in the province. The sun shines on average 1,519 hours per year and the average number of sunny days per month is 24. The average temperature is 23.2 °C in the summer and 16 °C in the winter.

The average rainfall is between 1,450 millimetres (57 in) and 1,650 millimetres (65 in) and the rainfall from May to October accounts for up to 70% of the year's total. The average humidity in the air is 86%; the highest level of humidity is 92% while the lowest level is 79%.

Climate data for Hưng Yên
Month	Jan	Feb	Mar	Apr	May	Jun	Jul	Aug	Sep	Oct	Nov	Dec	Year
Record high °C (°F)	32.0 (89.6)	33.6 (92.5)	37.6 (99.7)	37.0 (98.6)	40.5 (104.9)	39.4 (102.9)	40.5 (104.9)	37.8 (100.0)	36.4 (97.5)	35.3 (95.5)	34.5 (94.1)	31.6 (88.9)	40.5 (104.9)
Mean daily maximum °C (°F)	19.5 (67.1)	19.7 (67.5)	22.3 (72.1)	26.7 (80.1)	30.9 (87.6)	32.4 (90.3)	32.7 (90.9)	31.7 (89.1)	30.5 (86.9)	28.3 (82.9)	25.2 (77.4)	21.7 (71.1)	26.8 (80.2)
Daily mean °C (°F)	16.2 (61.2)	16.9 (62.4)	19.6 (67.3)	23.5 (74.3)	27.0 (80.6)	28.6 (83.5)	29.0 (84.2)	28.4 (83.1)	27.1 (80.8)	24.5 (76.1)	21.1 (70.0)	17.8 (64.0)	23.3 (73.9)
Mean daily minimum °C (°F)	14.0 (57.2)	15.0 (59.0)	17.8 (64.0)	21.4 (70.5)	24.2 (75.6)	25.8 (78.4)	26.3 (79.3)	25.8 (78.4)	24.6 (76.3)	21.8 (71.2)	18.4 (65.1)	15.1 (59.2)	20.8 (69.4)
Record low °C (°F)	4.9 (40.8)	5.3 (41.5)	6.6 (43.9)	12.2 (54.0)	16.5 (61.7)	19.4 (66.9)	20.6 (69.1)	21.8 (71.2)	16.5 (61.7)	20.5 (68.9)	8.4 (47.1)	4.8 (40.6)	4.8 (40.6)
Average precipitation mm (inches)	26 (1.0)	25 (1.0)	48 (1.9)	92 (3.6)	172 (6.8)	229 (9.0)	219 (8.6)	286 (11.3)	261 (10.3)	187 (7.4)	75 (3.0)	24 (0.9)	1,644 (64.7)
Average precipitation days	9.1	12.8	16.6	13.8	13.1	14.2	13.1	15.5	13.7	12	7.3	5.5	146.0
Average relative humidity (%)	85.2	87.6	90.1	89.8	86.2	84.4	84.0	87.1	86.9	84.8	82.6	82.4	85.9
Mean monthly sunshine hours	75	42	49	93	187	178	205	179	179	173	139	127	1,625
Source: Vietnam Institute for Building Science and Technology

== Culture ==
There are historical and cultural relics in the area, some of which are related to the imperial examination.

=== Chronices ===
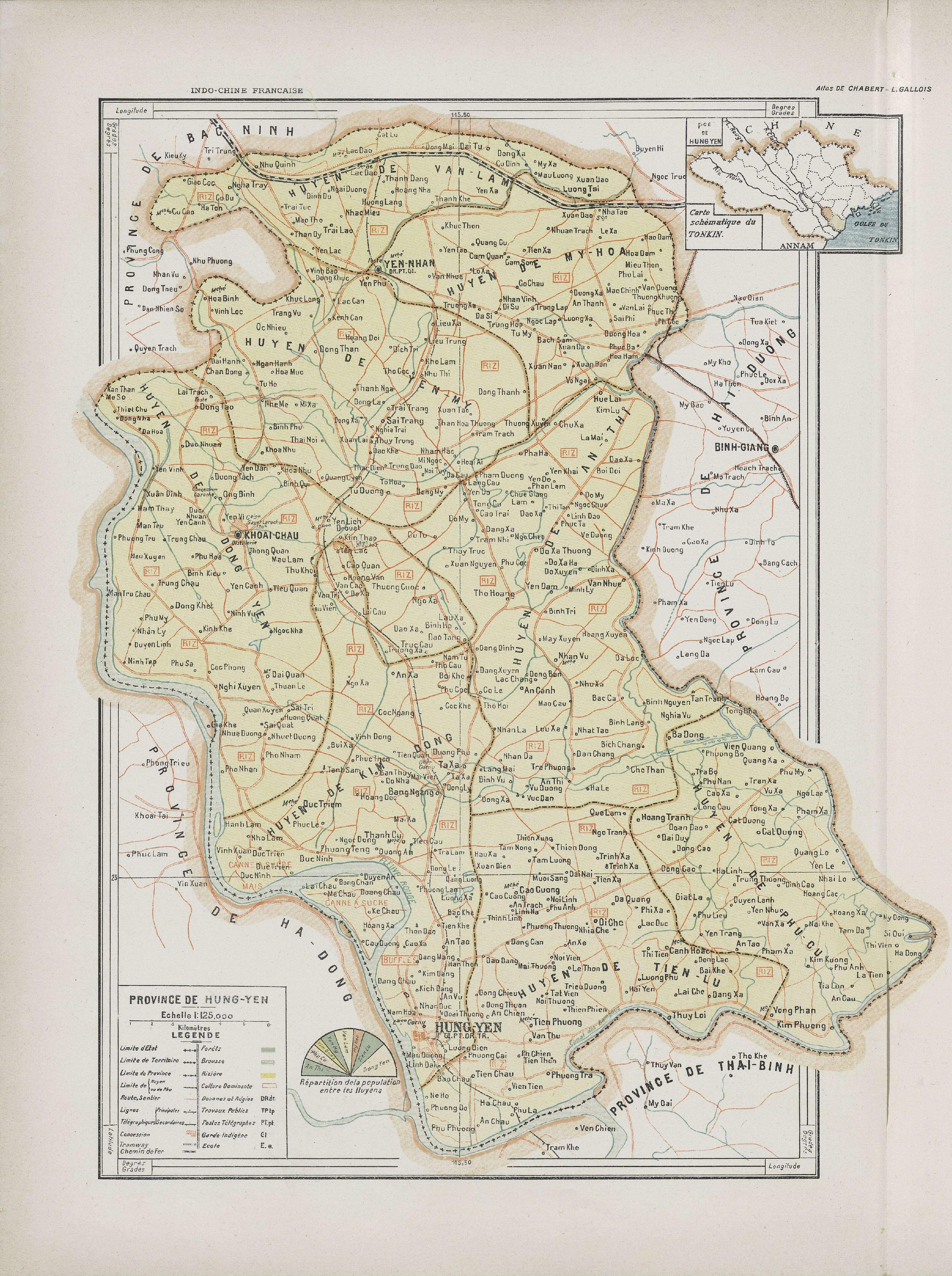
Map of Hưng Yên province in 1909.

Hưng Yên địa chí (Trịnh Như Tấu, 1934).

Hưng Yên địa chí (Trịnh Như Tấu, 1937).

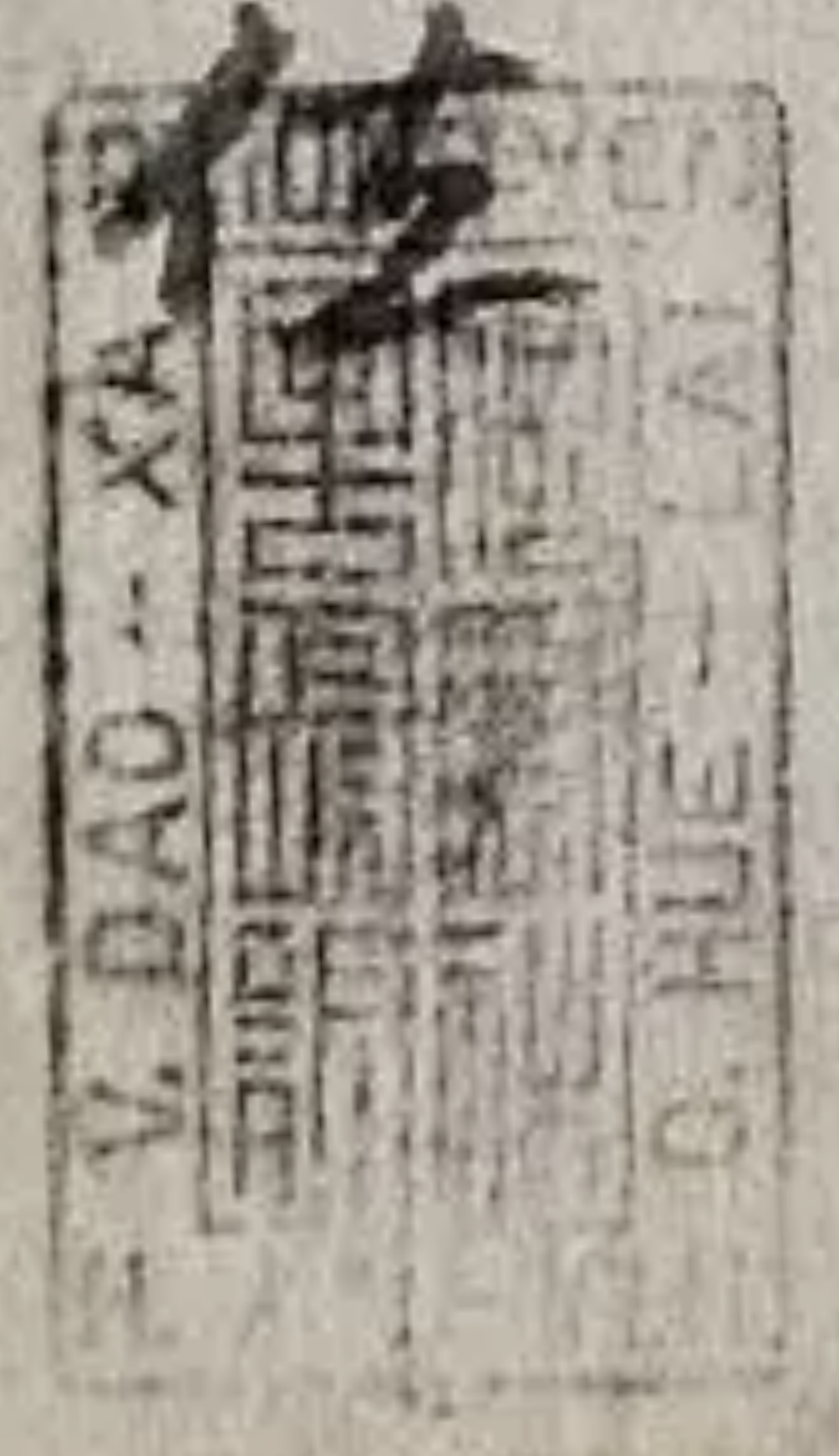

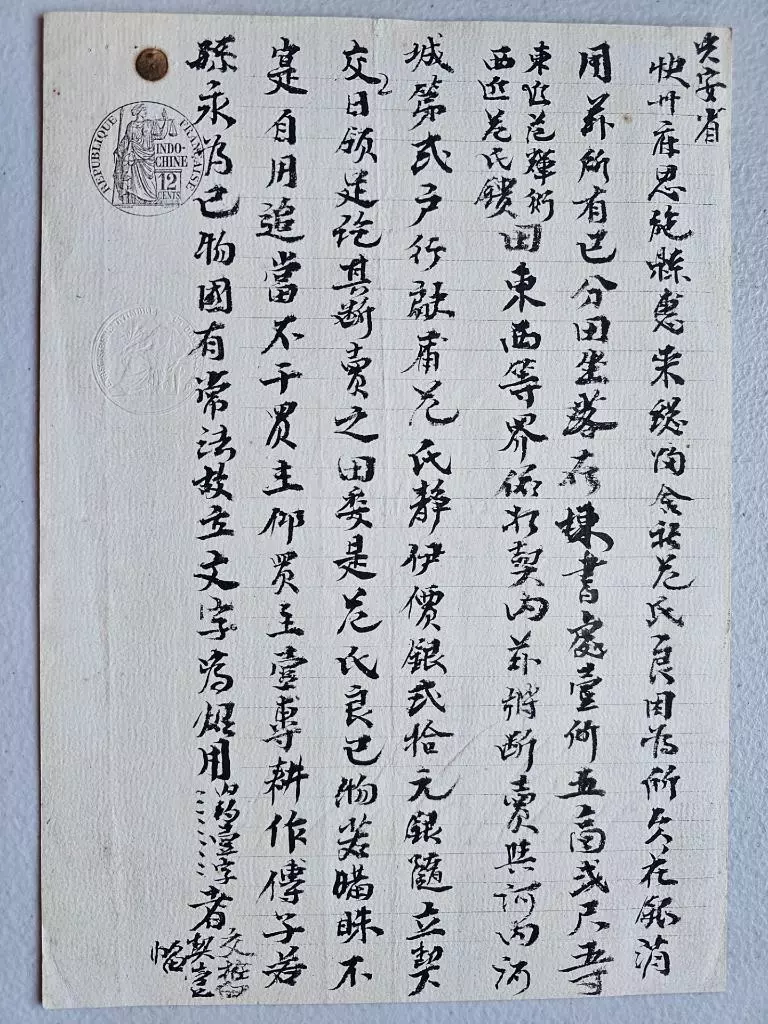

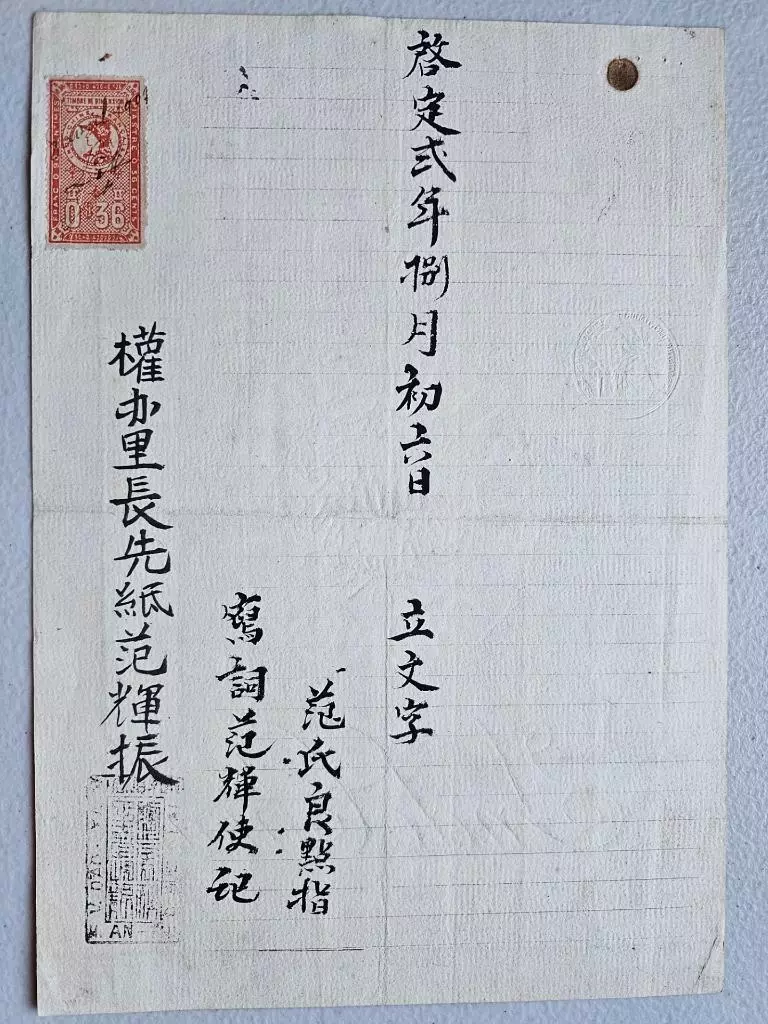

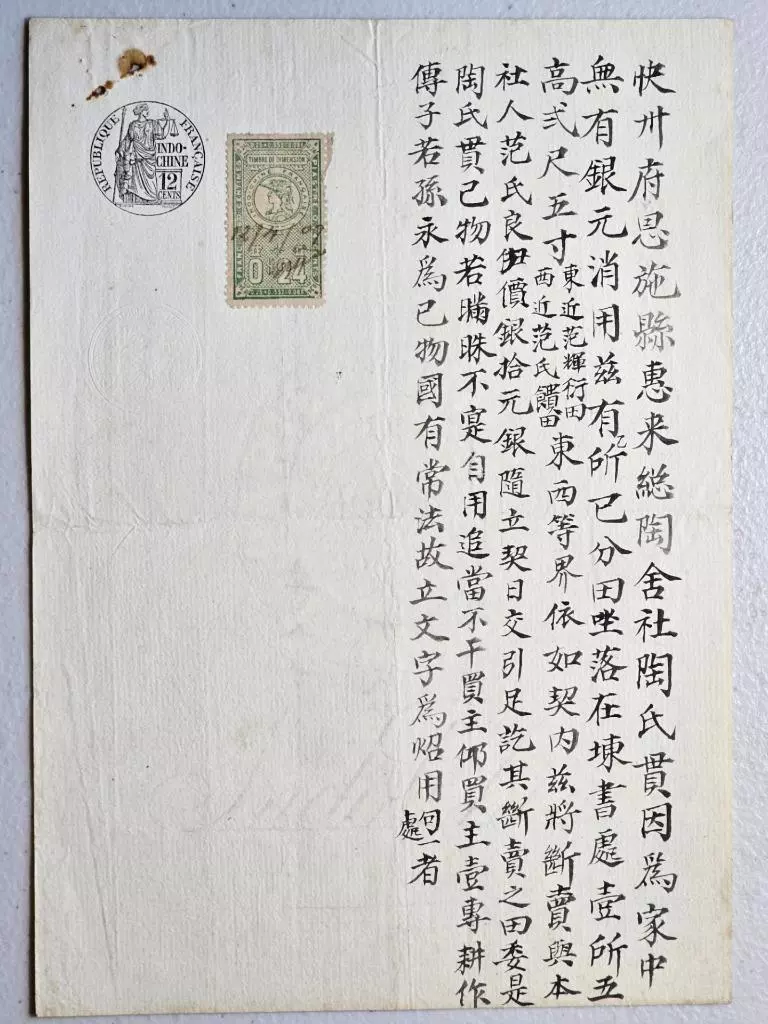

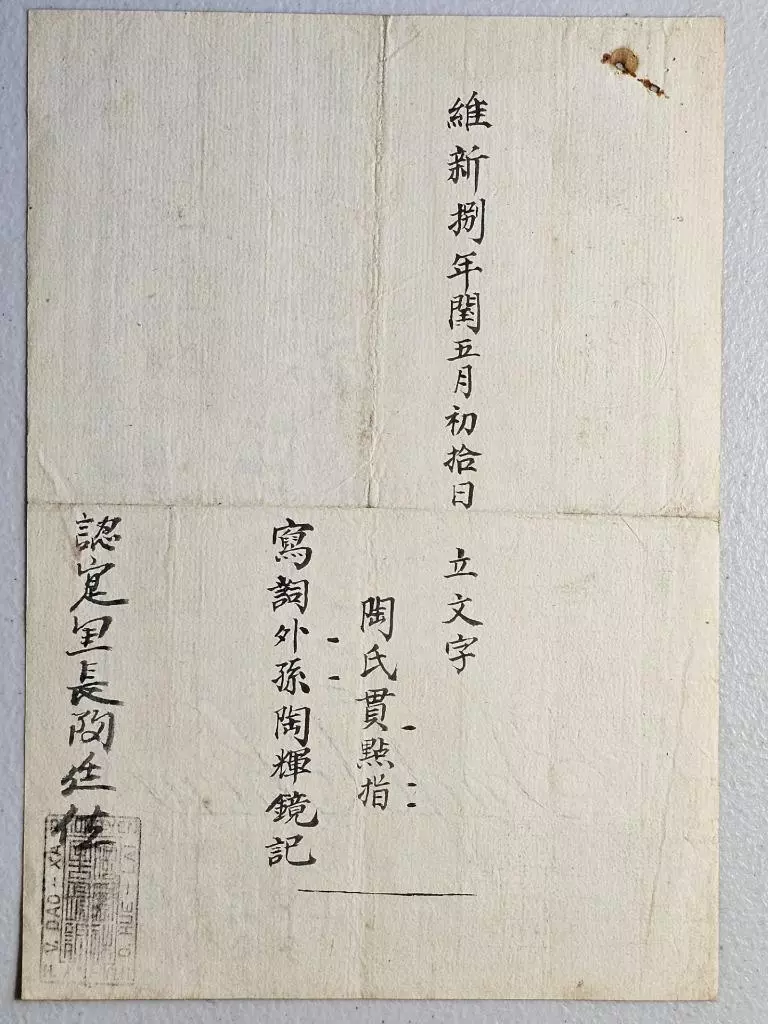

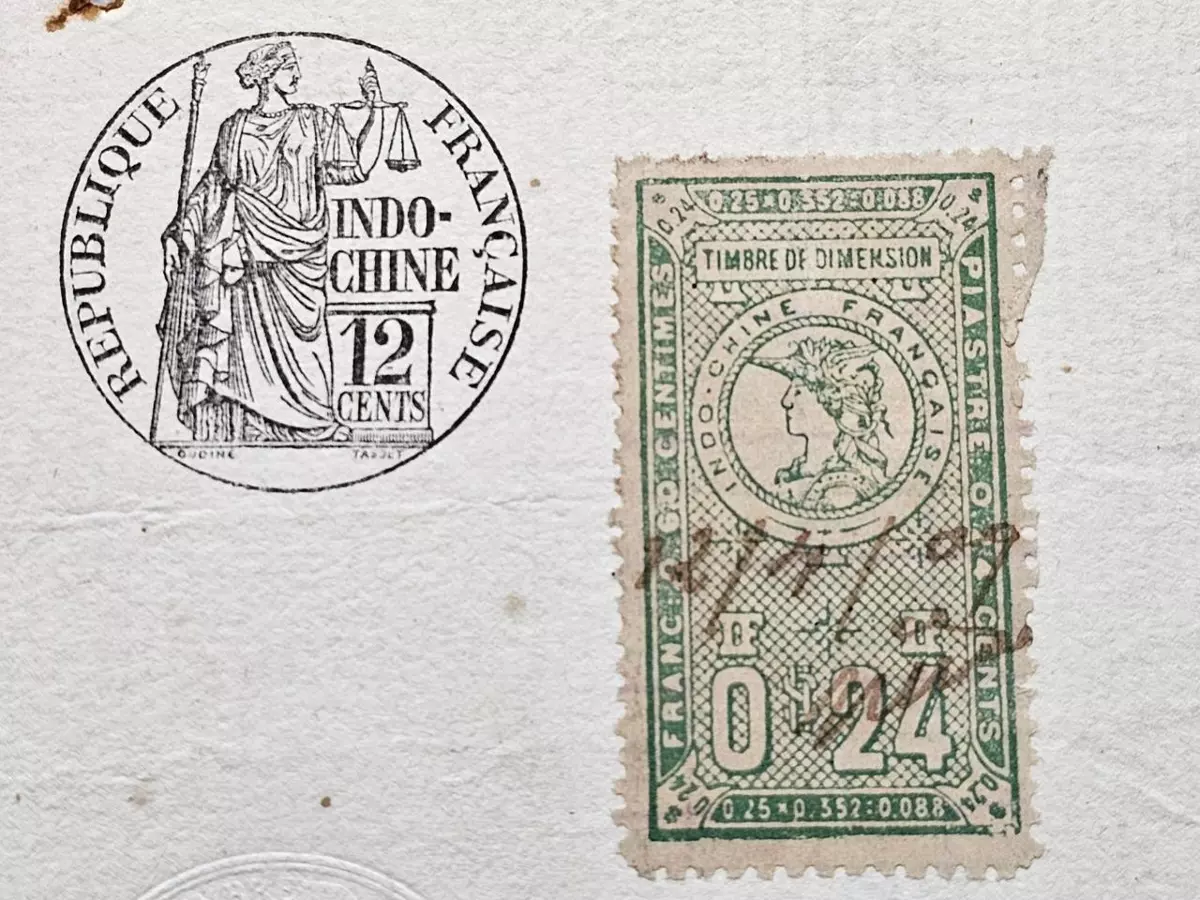

=== Landscapes ===
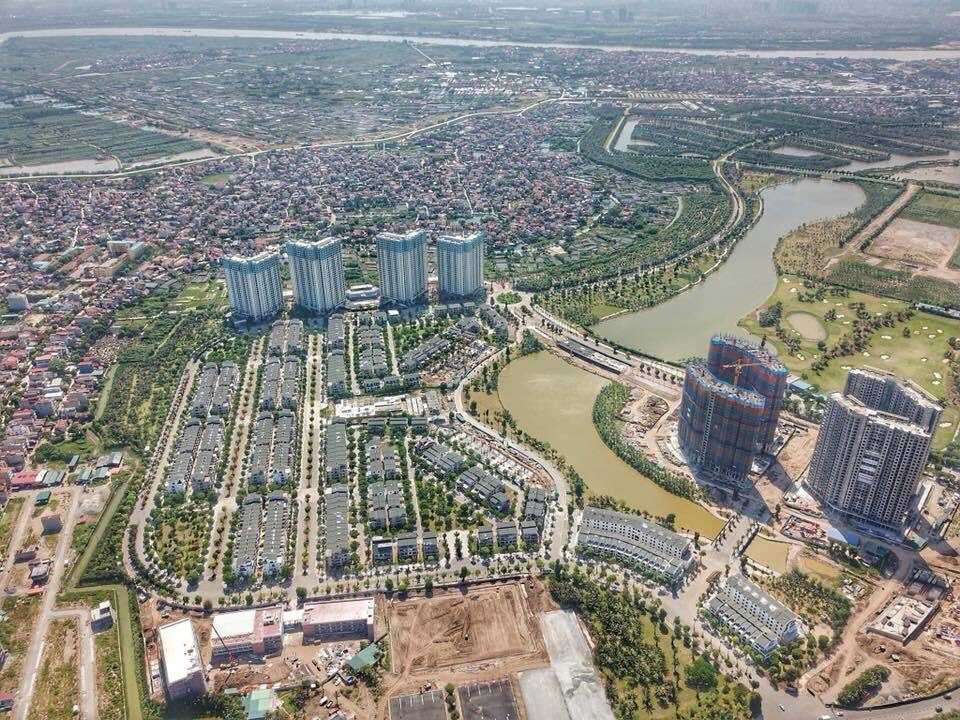
Ecopark Văn Giang

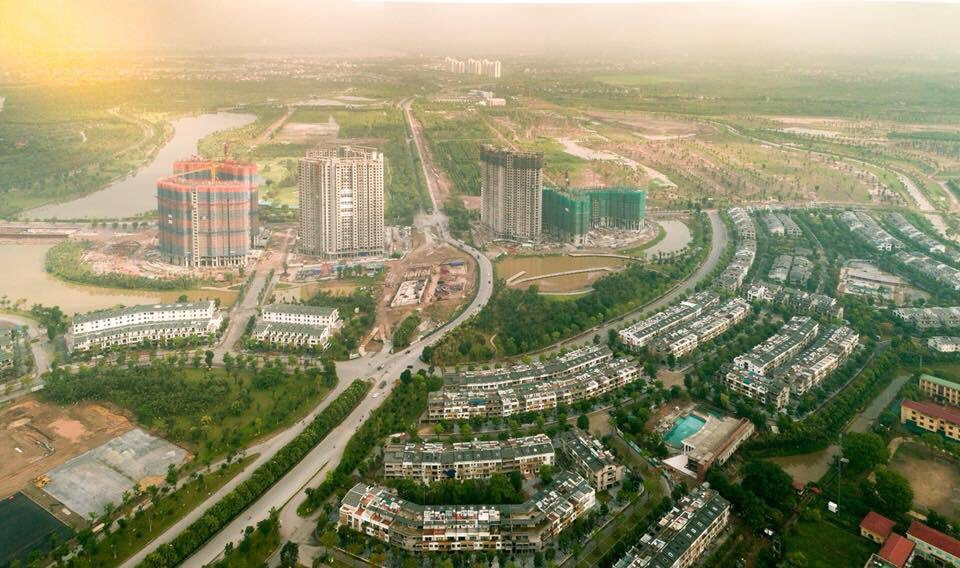
Khu đô thị Văn Giang Urban area

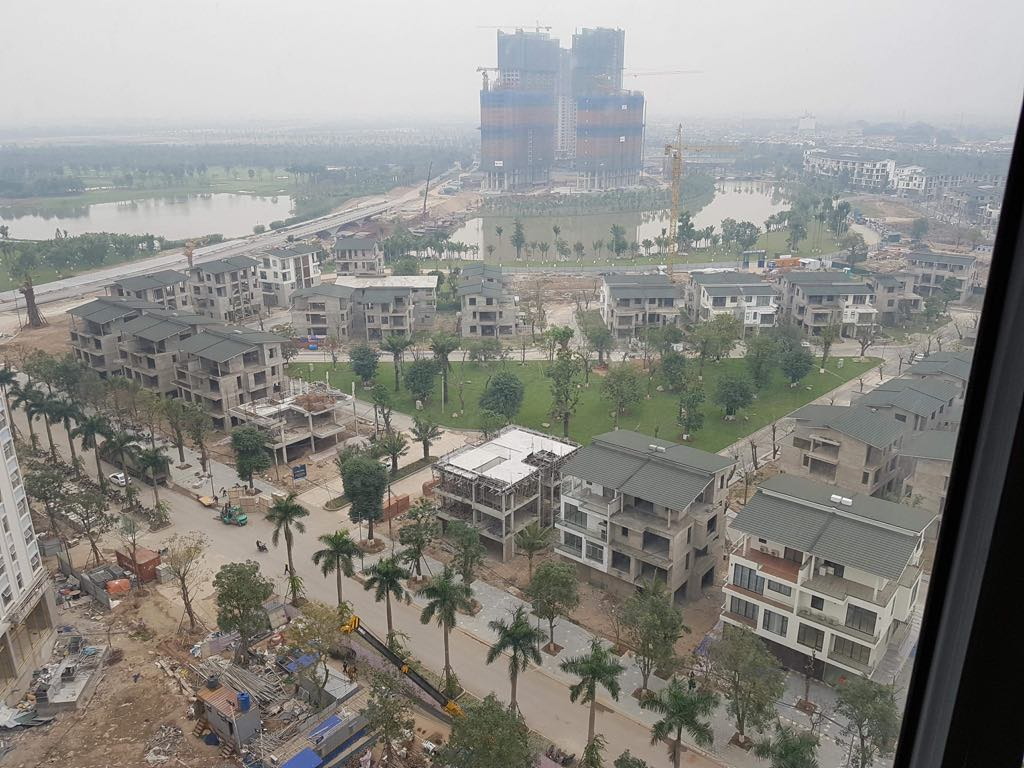
Văn Giang Township

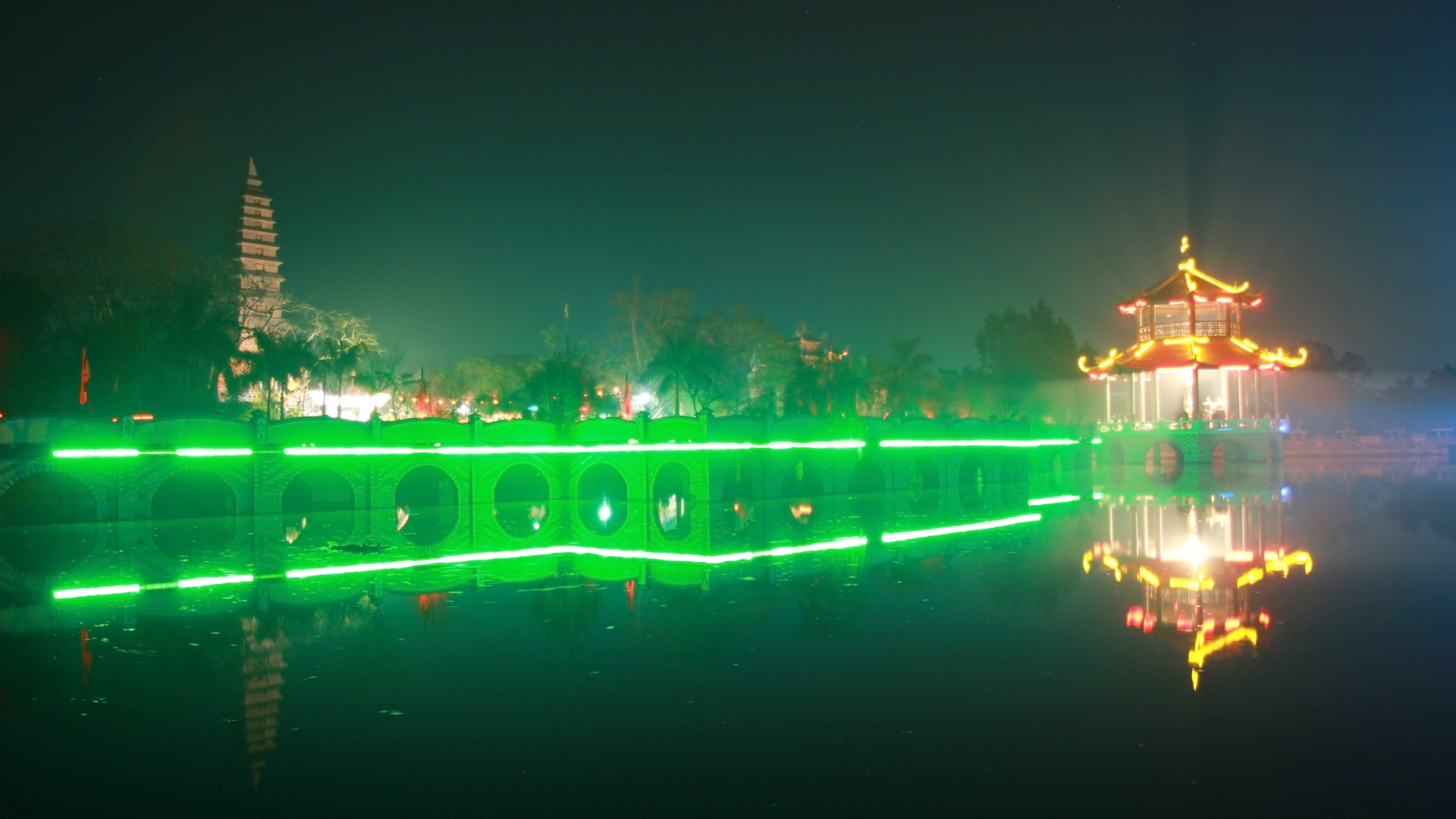
Nôm Pagoda - Văn Lâm

== Economy ==
Due to the characteristics of an area that receives alluvial deposits from the Red River, Hưng Yên province is known as the "king of fruits" or "the gift of heaven" because of its richness in fruit harvesting and processing.

After the COVID-19 pandemic passed, the province promoted an economic stimulus program with the ambition of becoming an elite green industrial zone in the Red River Delta.

In 2024, representatives of The Trump Organization signed a co-operation and investment document worth 1,5 billion USD in the real estate sector in Hưng Yên province with the Kinh-Bac City Development Holding Corporation (Tổng công ty Phát triển Đô thị Kinh Bắc, KBC). This event caused a stir in the Vietnamese business community for a period.
