= Luộc River =

Tributary river in Vietnam

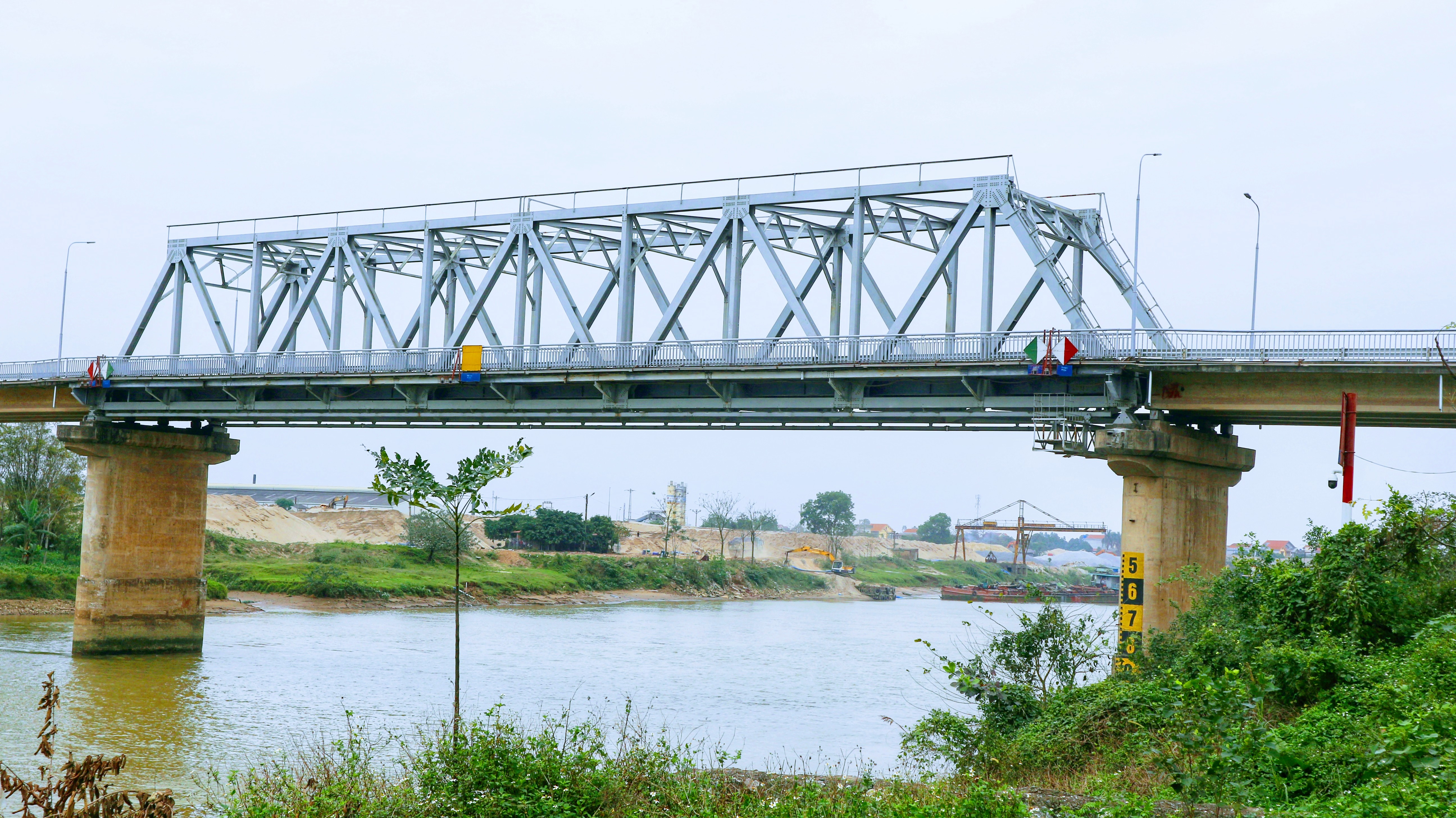
Triều Dương Bridge crossing the Luộc River

The river Luộc (Vietnamese: sông Luộc) also known by the formal Sino-Vietnamese name sông Phú Nông, is a tributary river to the Hồng River and Thái Bình River. It was previously known by the French as the Canal des Bambous.

Nguyễn Du wrote about the sông Luộc in his chữ Nho poem Feeling on Crossing the Phú Nông giang (渡富農江感作).
