= Nguyễn Du =

Vietnamese poet (1766–1820)

- Nguyễn Du 阮攸
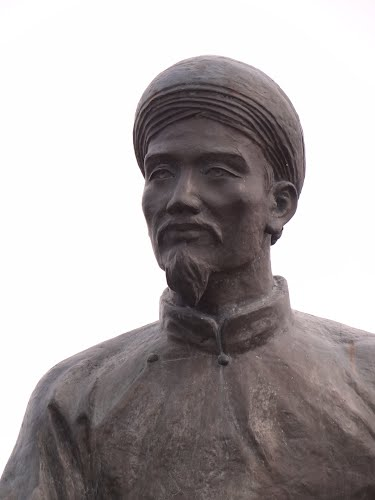
- Nguyễn Du's statue at the site of his ancestral house in Hà Tĩnh Province.
- Born: 3 January 1766; Thăng Long, Đại Việt
- Died: 18 September 1820 (aged 54); Huế, Vietnam
- Resting place: Nghi Xuân District, Principality of Nghệ An (now Hà Tĩnh Province), Vietnam
- Occupations: Poet, mandarin
- Writing career
- Language: Vietnamese, Literary Chinese
- Notable work: The Tale of Kiều

Signature
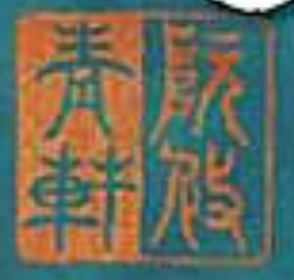

Nguyễn Du (Vietnamese pronunciation: [ŋʷiə̌nˀ zū], 阮攸; 3 January 1766 – 16 September 1820), courtesy name Tố Như (Vietnamese pronunciation: [tǒ ɲɯ̄], 素如) and art name Thanh Hiên (清軒), was a poet and scholar-official, widely acclaimed as one of the most important writers of Vietnamese literature. Fluent in both Literary Chinese and the Nôm script then used to transcribe the Vietnamese language, Du left behind a prolific body of works that demonstrates a mastery of various poetic forms, from Vietnamese adaptations of Tang-dynasty styles to folk forms such as song thất lục bát and lục bát. His most well-known work is Truyện Kiều (傳翹 The Tale of Kiều, or colloquially Kiều), a novel-in-verse now considered to be the masterpiece of Vietnamese literature.

Born into a noble, well-educated family, Nguyễn Du lived through a tumultuous era in Vietnamese history, in which three consecutive dynasties—the Lê, the Tây Sơn, and the Nguyễn—toppled one another. His poetry expresses a general malaise at the state of things, particularly at the social injustices and the suffering that political turmoil incurred on the laypeople. Despite aligning himself with the Neo-Confucianist Nguyễn dynasty, Du also wrote about rebel figures who dare to defy the imperial order and decried the oppression of women of his time. With the advent of Westernization, modernization and nationalism in French-occupied Vietnam in the early twentieth century, Du was transformed into a national and cultural figure, his works regularly discussed, debated, and reinterpreted under the French occupation, then in North and South Vietnam, then in the Socialist Republic. Today, Du is considered in Vietnamese society to be the "greatest poet of the nation" (đại thi hào dân tộc), and his ancestral house in Hà Tĩnh province is designated a Special National Site.

== Life ==
=== Early years ===
Nguyễn Du was born on January 3, 1766, during the Cảnh Hưng era, in the Bích Câu area just outside the confines of the Imperial Citadel of Thăng Long. His father, Nguyễn Nghiễm (1708–1776), was a high-ranked minister, and his mother, Trần Thị Tần (1740–1778) was Nghiễm's third wife. Du's paternal side was a family of educated noblemen from the village of Tiên Điền in Nghi Xuân district, Nghệ An Principality (now part of Hà Tĩnh Province) many of whom passed the civil service examinations, served the Lê dynasty, and became accomplished poets in their own right. This includes his elder half-brother Nguyễn Khản (1734–1787); his nephew Nguyễn Huy Tự (1743–1790), author of the Nôm verse novel Hoa tiên; and his brother-in-law Vũ Trinh (1759–1828), a playwright and later co-author of the new legal code of the Nguyễn dynasty.

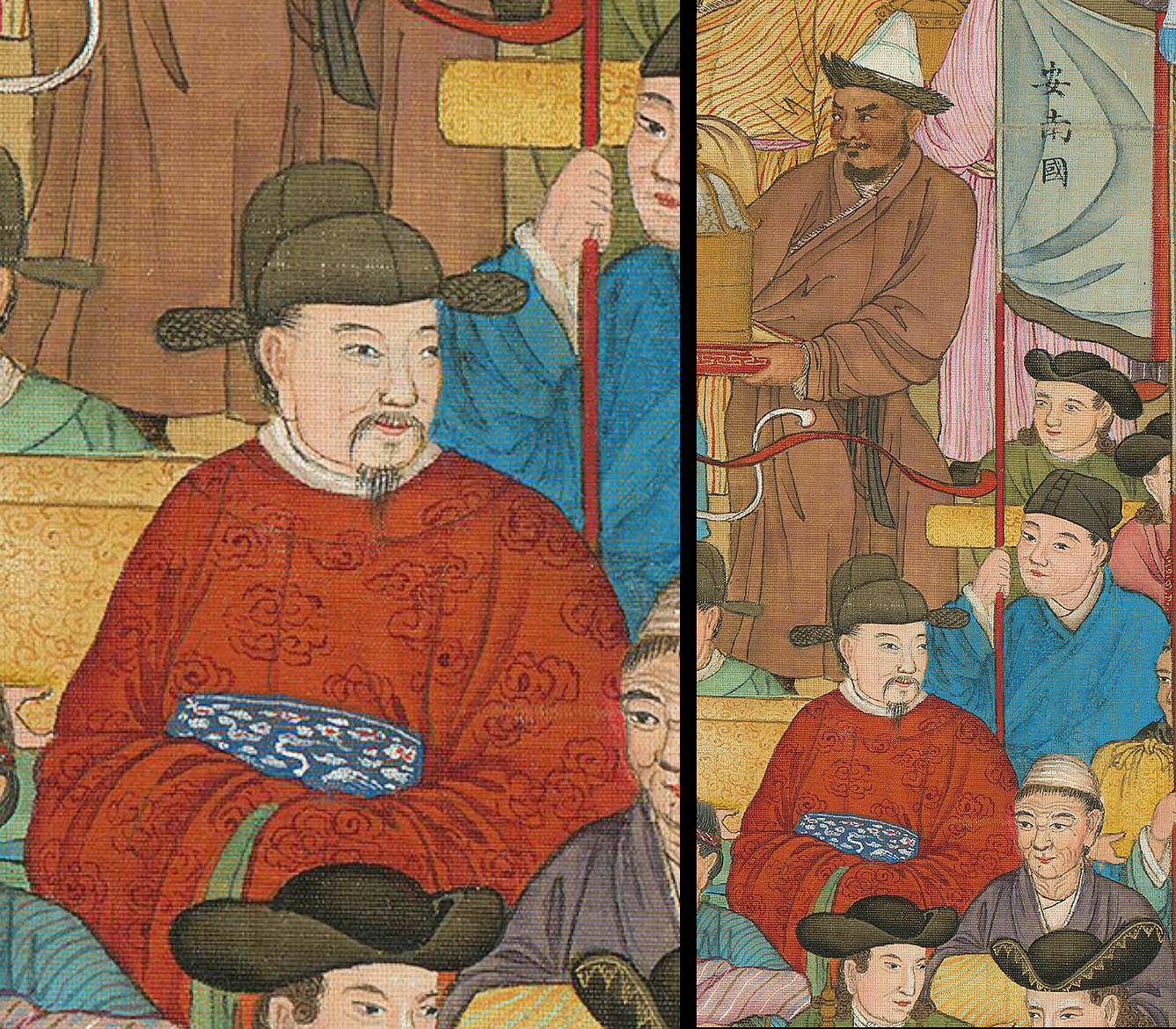
A Đại Việt delegate to the Qing court in 1761. The mandarin robes worn by Du's family would have been similar to this.

Growing up, Du was familiar with the arts, mainly because of his intellectual genealogy, but also in part because his family house was situated in what was then the intellectual elites' side of the capital. Bích Câu was close to the Temple of Literature and Imperial Academy (Văn Miếu–Quốc Tử Giám), and was the meeting place of the literati, even featured as the setting of a Literary Chinese short story attributed to Đoàn Thị Điểm. While Du was living here, Marquis Hoàng Ngũ Phúc once saw him and remarked that the child had an "extraordinary physiognomy". As a reward, the Marquis gave him a jeweled sword.

In 1771, Nguyễn Nghiễm retired. The five-year-old Du accompanied his father back to their home village of Tiên Điền. Five years later, Nguyễn Nghiễm passed away. Du lived with his mother until 1778, when his mother died too, leaving him an orphan at the age of twelve to be looked after by his siblings and relatives.

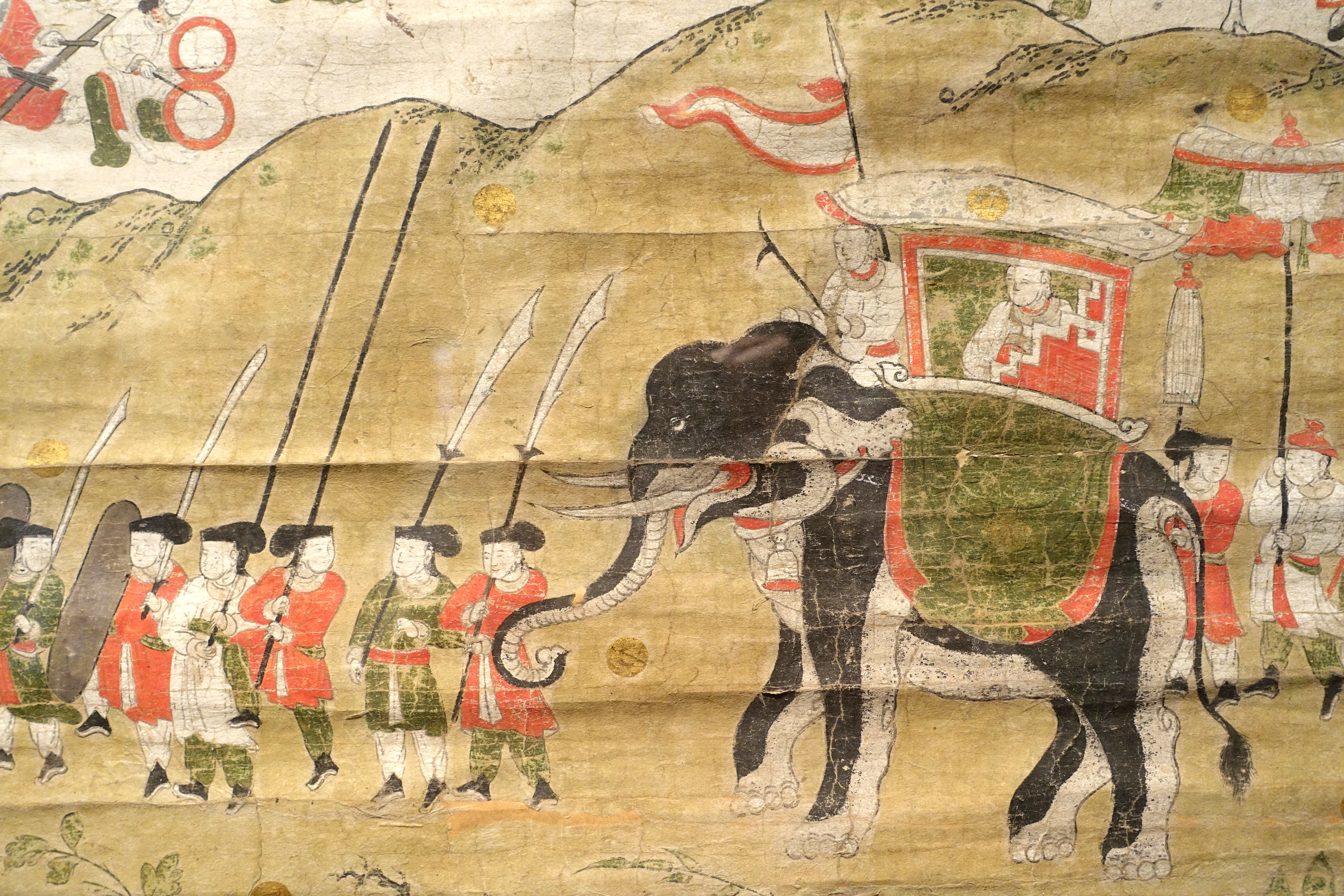
Armies of the Trịnh lords, depicted in an 18th-century painting at the Vietnam National Museum of Fine Arts.

Nguyễn Du's orphanhood came at what was also a turning point in the final years of the Lê dynasty. By then, the Lê emperor remained only a figurehead, while effective power lay in the hands of the Trịnh lords, who had consolidated their power with the support of armies from three prefectures in modern Nghệ An and Thanh Hoá. These regional troops, known as the Three Prefectures Army (Tam phủ quân 三府軍), took advantage of their alliance with the royal court to commit abuses of power, such as destroying the house of a provincial military governor who dared to reject their demands in 1741. The peak of these abuses began in 1782, when Lord Trịnh Sâm died, and his oldest son Trịnh Khải, upset that his five-year-old brother Trịnh Cán was crowned, colluded with the Three Prefectures Army to kill the regent and dethrone Cán. With the new Trịnh lord now indebted to them, the Three Prefectures Army was free to wreak havoc, robbing the laypeople and defying the law in what is known as the kiêu binh (驕兵 arrogant soldiers) crisis. Enraged, Nguyễn Du's forty-eight-year-old brother, Chancellor Nguyễn Khản, petitioned the Trinh lord to execute the warlords. However, the plan was foiled; Khản fled to Sơn Tây and took refuge with his brother Nguyễn Điều, a military governor, while his house in Bích Câu was burned down.

From Sơn Tây, Khản and Điều made a last-ditch effort to entreat regional governors to send troops to the capital, but the kiêu binh caught wind of this and took the Trịnh lord hostage. Khản retreated to Tiên Điền, where his little brother Nguyễn Du, now a young adult, had recently passed the province-level civil service exams. Through nepotism, Khản arranged for Du a junior administrative job in Thái Nguyên. Around this time, Du also married Đoàn Nguyễn Thị Huệ, a daughter of the poet and mandarin Đoàn Nguyễn Thục in Quỳnh Côi, Thái Bình province, although the circumstances around how they met remain unclear. Historian Keith Taylor speculated that the marriage was orchestrated by Nguyễn Nghiễm's friend in the local administration in Quỳnh Côi, who felt responsibility towards Nghiễm's orphaned son and presumably wanted to marry him into a family of equal prestige.

=== "Ten years of wind and dust" ===
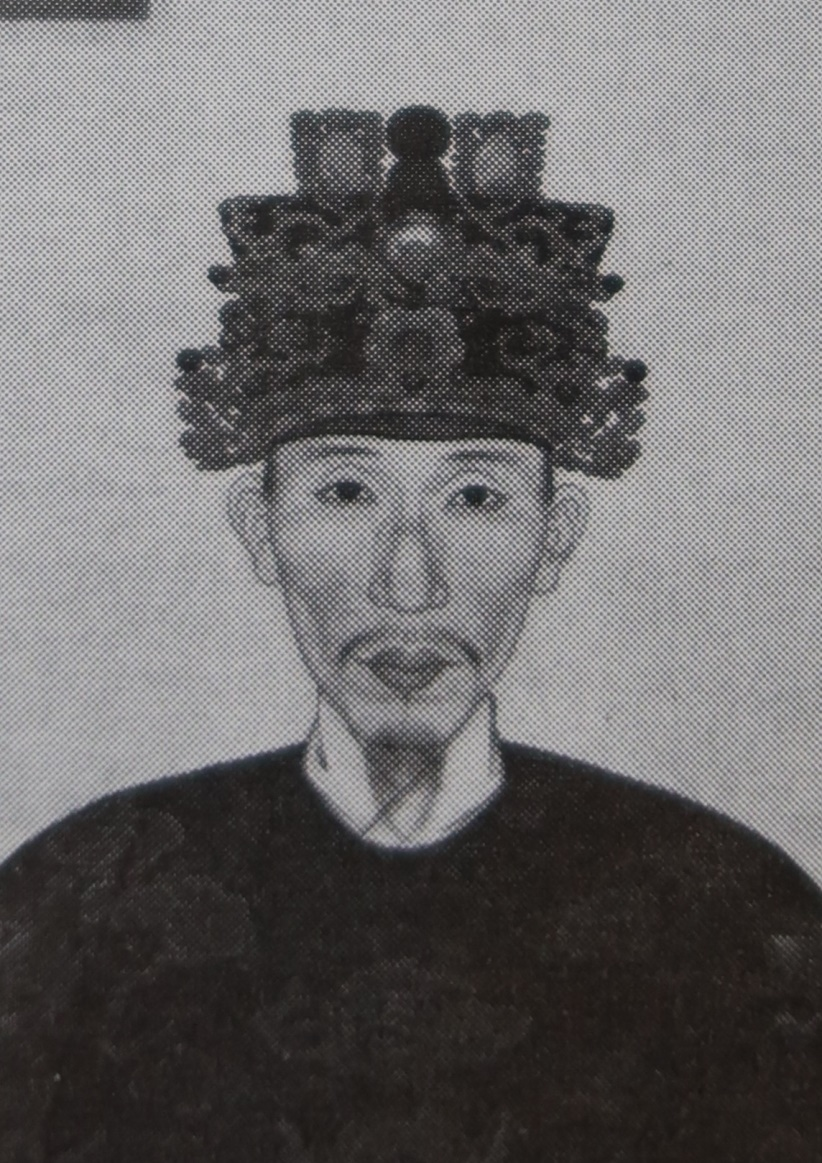
Qing portrait of Nguyễn Huệ, also known as Emperor Quang Trung.

While the Three Prefectures Army was raging in the northern provinces of Đại Việt, other troubles were brewing down south, where the Lê and Trịnh dynasts exercised far less control. Since at least the early seventeenth century, the Lê-Trịnh had been at war with the southern Nguyễn lords, and after a de facto ceasefire was accepted in 1672, the Gianh River was chosen as their demarcation line. In 1771, motivated by tax burdens and socioeconomic hardships, a rebellion broke out in Nguyễn territory, led by three brothers Nguyễn Nhạc, Nguyễn Huệ, and Nguyễn Lữ from Tây Sơn (no relation to the Nguyễn lords). The Tây Sơn launched naval and land attacks against the Nguyễn lords, pursuing their armed forces and massacring almost every single member of their family. After defeating Prince Nguyễn Ánh, the most senior survivor of the Nguyễn, in 1786, the Tây Sơn brothers embarked on a northward expedition to topple the Lê-Trịnh regime. Frightened by the Tây Sơn's atrocities, Emperor Lê Chiêu Thống fled to Qing China to seek asylum. Nguyễn Du intended to follow, but after his plans fell through, he sought refuge instead in his wife's homeland in Quỳnh Côi, Thái Bình province. This marks the beginning of an era of hardship and wandering, which he described in his poem "Living in Seclusion" (U cư 幽居) as "ten years of wind and dust" (thập tải phong trần 十載風塵).

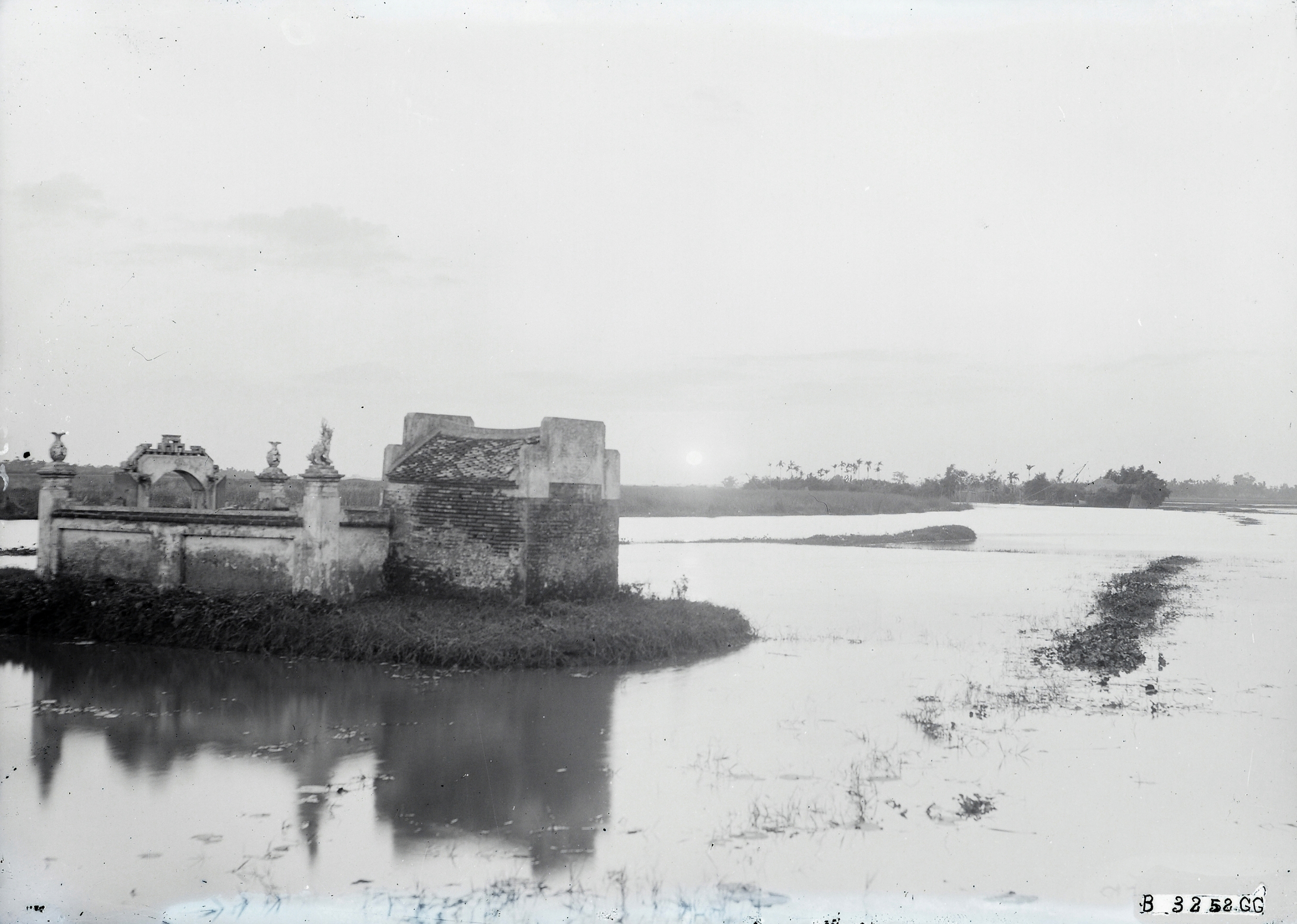
A paddy field in Quỳnh Côi, Thái Bình, the homeland of Du's wife, in 1928.

Not much is recorded of Du's life during this vagrant decade. We know that he stayed in Thái Bình with his older brother-in-law Đoàn Nguyễn Tuấn; however, in 1789, Tuấn departed for Thăng Long with a few other former Lê loyalists—including Nguyễn Đề, one of Du's own brothers—to pledge allegiance to the Tây Sơn. What happened after is a patchy chapter of history. One of Du's poems is a farewell to send off his brother Nguyễn Quýnh, who was returning to Tiên Điền; his family's genealogy book later recounts that Quýnh went on to stage a counter-rebellion in Tiên Điền against the Tây Sơn, which resulted in his capture and execution in 1791. In any case, the poem being a simple send-off means that Du did not return home with Quýnh, but where he ended up staying is unknown. In the foreword of his long poem Long thành cầm giả ca (龍城琴者歌, The Song of the Lute Player of Thăng Long), Du mentioned visiting Nguyễn Đề in the capital after the Lê had fallen; this would put the visit some time after Đoàn Nguyễn Tuấn and Nguyễn Đề's pledge of allegiance, suggesting that he did eventually leave Thái Bình to travel.

Beyond the unanswered questions on Du's whereabouts, the only certainty of this period, based on his writings, is that he was deeply melancholy at the world. His poetry, predominantly written in Literary Chinese, describes a pervasive longing for his brothers and hometown, together with a general sense of helplessness, whereby he felt that his twenties had been wasted, and his health was already in decline without him having accomplished anything. Eventually, in the mid-1790s, Du did return to Tiên Điền. He spent his time fishing, hunting, and writing poetry, taking on the pen names Nam Hải điếu đồ (南海釣屠 The Fisherman of the South Sea) and Hồng Sơn lạp hộ (鴻山獵戶 The Hunter of the Hồng Mountains). The latter moniker is inspired by the Hồng Lĩnh Mountains, the mountain range of his homeland that is traditionally considered to have 99 peaks.

=== Alliance with Nguyễn Ánh ===
While Du was lying low in his hometown, the Tây Sơn were in rapid decline. Nguyễn Huệ died in 1792, Nguyễn Nhạc the year after, and down in the deep south, Prince Nguyễn Ánh was building up his armed forces to overthrow the Tây Sơn, receiving significant technological assistance from the French. With the Citadel of Saigon serving as his seat of power, Nguyễn Ánh began attacking the Tây Sơn and over time reconquered former Nguyễn territories. In 1796, Du decided to abandon his place of refuge and head south to join the Nguyễn. However, he was arrested by Marquis Nguyễn Thận, a Tây Sơn general, and imprisoned in Nghệ An for three months, until his brother Nguyễn Đề intervened for his release. Defeated, Du retreated to his home village to fish and write poetry all over again.

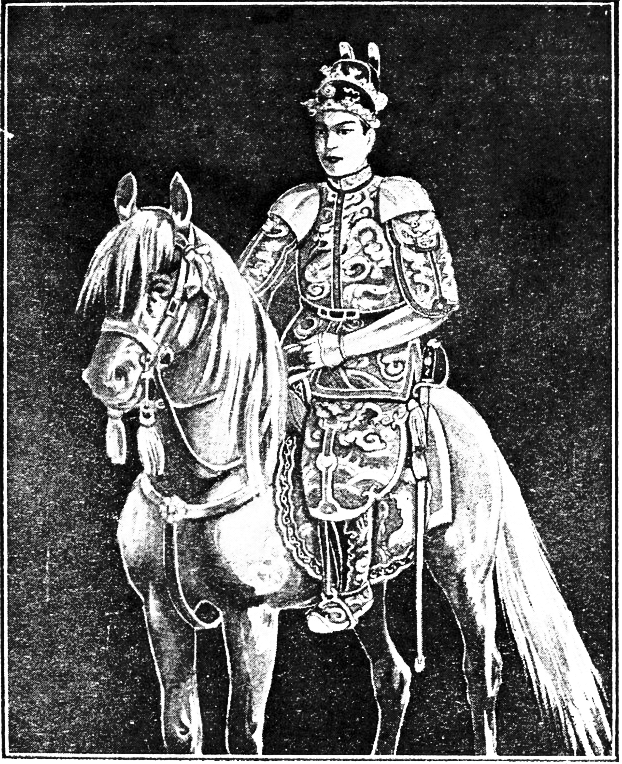
Nguyễn Ánh, later known as Emperor Gia Long.

In 1802, Nguyễn Ánh defeated the Tây Sơn and crowned himself as Emperor Gia Long. While Gia Long did condemn the Tây Sơn military commanders to exact punishments (for example, Nguyễn Huệ's son was quartered, and General Bùi Thị Xuân was trampled to death by an elephant), he was lenient when it comes to the intellectual elites. Đoàn Nguyễn Tuấn, Nguyễn Đề, and other pro-Tây Sơn elites were called upon to serve the new dynasty; Tuấn refused, but Đề accepted. As Đề escorted Gia Long's procession past Nghệ An, Du showed up for an audience with the king and pledged his support. Right away, he was hired as district magistrate of Phù Dung (modern-day Khoái Châu, Hưng Yên province), and three months later, promoted to prefectural magistrate of Thường Tín (modern-day southern Hanoi).

Du's life as a mandarin for the Nguyễn was more well-documented from here. In 1803, he was assigned to lead a delegation welcoming the Qing envoy at Trấn Nam Pass, where he was also responsible for writing speeches at banquets and poems to gift the foreign diplomats. A year later, while serving in Thường Tín, Du requested a sick leave and went back to his hometown. When he returned, he was summoned to Huế, now the kingdom's capital, and was promoted to Grand Secretary of the Eastern Library (Đông Các đại học sĩ 東閣大學士), making him a high-ranked member of the imperial cabinet. Sources disagree on the time of this promotion: his family's genealogy book in Tiên Điền writes that this took place in the spring of the Ất Sửu year (1805), while an imperial record, the Đại Nam chính biên liệt truyện (大南正編列傳 The Primary Compilation of Biographies of Đại Nam) notes the time as the fifth year of Gia Long's reign (1806).

=== Service in the Nguyễn administration ===
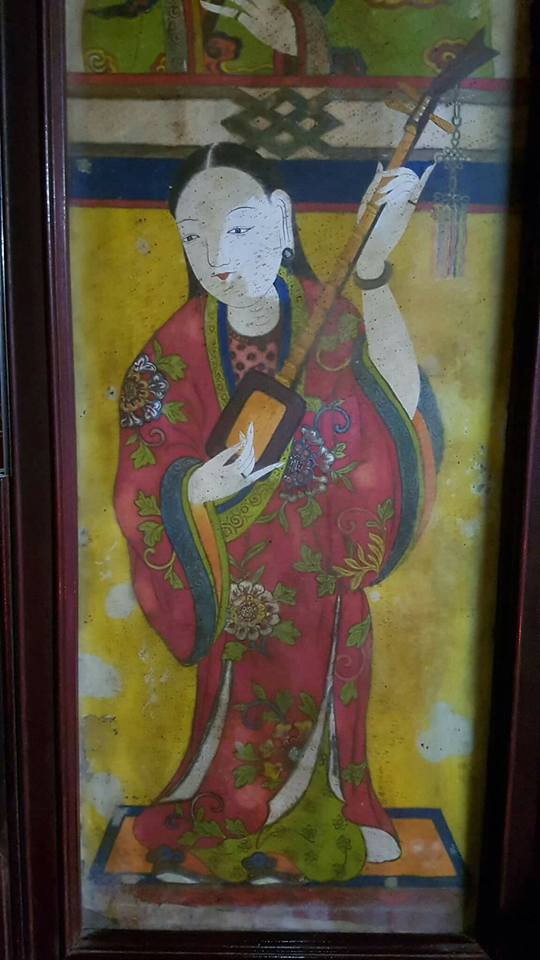
Depiction of a đào nương (ca trù performer) playing the lute (đàn đáy) from the 18th century.

In late 1807, Du was tasked by Gia Long to preside over the provincial civil service examinations in Hải Dương. The following year, he requested another sick leave; this time, the emperor provided him with 100 quan (each quan corresponds to a string of 600 coins) and a hundred phương of rice (a phương amounts to 13 liters). Returning in 1809, he was assigned to be the Administrative Commissioner (該簿 cai bạ) of Quảng Bình province, not too far away from the capital. According to his family's genealogy book, he was "simple in conducting the official affairs, without a desire for fame, and was loved by elites and laypeople alike. However, the Đại Nam chính biên liệt truyện, paints a different picture, where he was "frequently humiliated by his superiors and consequently writhed in frustration". Additionally, the Đại Nam thực lục (大南寔錄 Veritable Records of Đại Nam) also describes him as "a scaredy man, frightened and speechless at every audience with the Emperor." Gia Long is reported to have scolded him for this attitude, reminding him of the favors he had received and the many important tasks with which the Emperor had entrusted him. In the autumn of 1812, Du requested to come home for two months to build a tomb for his newly deceased brother, Nguyễn Đề, which the Emperor also allowed.

In 1813, Gia Long tasked him to lead a delegation to the Qing court. While the trip only lasted a year, it proved to be important to his literary career and emotionally resonant for himself. During his stay in northern Vietnam before heading further north, Du revisited some of the locations where he had wandered during the years of wind and dust. In Thăng Long, he attended a ca trù performance near the Temple of Literature and recognized the lute player as a musician he had admired in his youth; seeing her graying hair and blighted looks reminds him of how much change their country had gone through, and how much older he had become since the last time they saw each other. This was his inspiration for the long poem Long thành cầm giả ca (龍城琴者歌, The Song of the Lute Player of Thăng Long), as he noted in his foreword. Departing from Thăng Long, he traveled onwards into Qing territory and made numerous stops at locations associated with the classical poems he had long admired. Notable stops include the region of Xiangyin where Guan Yu jumped into the Miluo River to his death; the Yellow Crane Tower famously featured in the poems of Li Bai and Cui Hao; and the tomb of Ouyang Xiu, one of the Eight Masters of the Tang and Song. When Du returned to Huế in 1814, his Literary Chinese poetry collection from the entire trip, titled Bắc hành tạp lục (北行雜錄 Travels to the North), was published.

In the summer of 1815, the royal court recommended him for vice-minister (tham tri 參知) of the Ministry of Rites (Lễ bộ 禮部). The following year, he was asked once again to preside over the provincial civil service exams, this time in Quảng Nam. He sent a rejection letter, which Gia Long approved.

=== Death ===
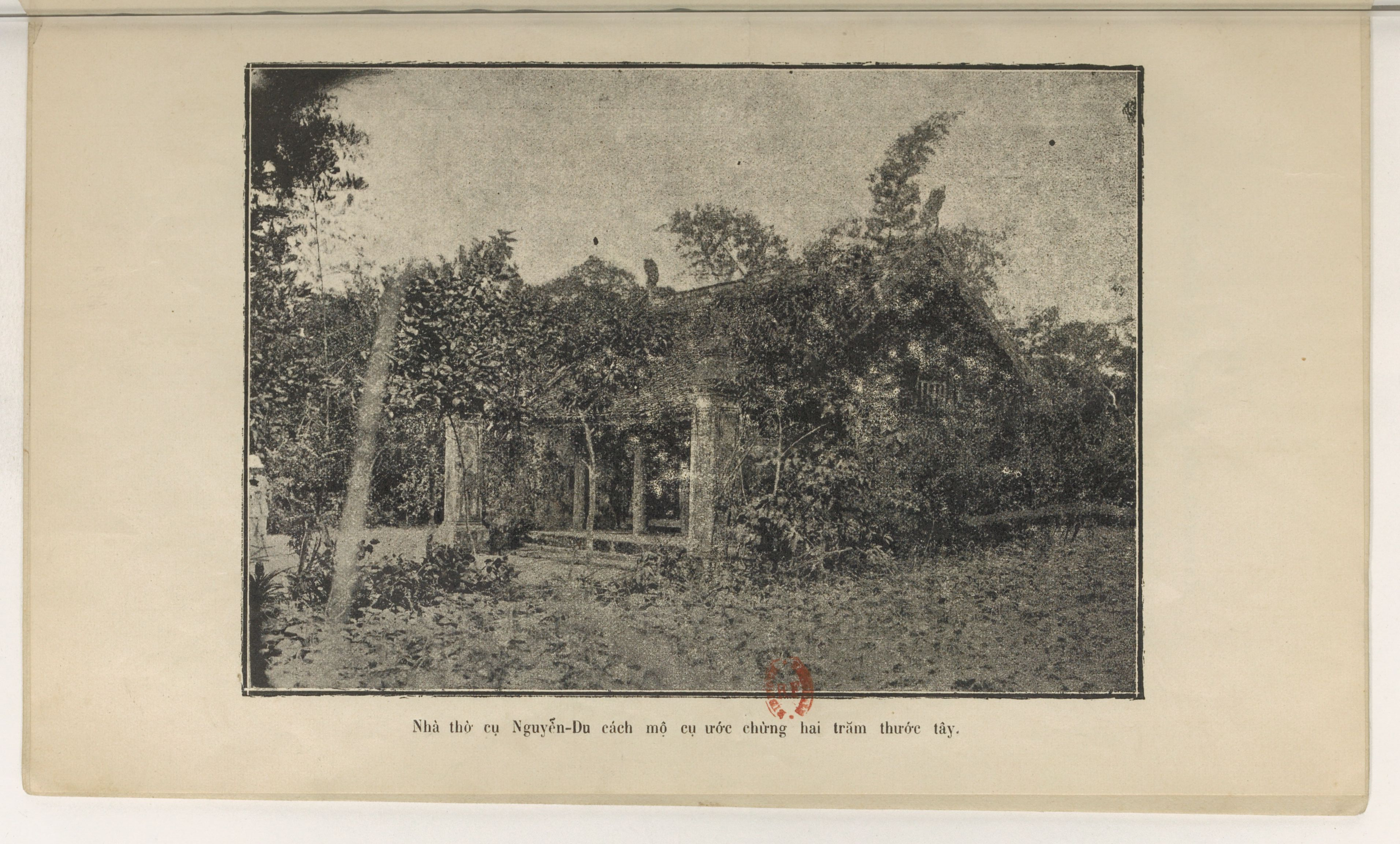
A shrine dedicated to Nguyễn Du, located around 200 meters away from his grave site. Pictured here in 1924.

Emperor Gia Long died in February 1820, and was succeeded by his son Minh Mạng. The new monarch assigned Du to lead a delegation to Qing China to inform them of the change in ruler. However, before he could embark on his trip, Du was struck with an illness, believed to be cholera from an ongoing outbreak in Central Vietnam at the time. According to the Đại Nam chính biên liệt truyện, Du refused treatment for his illness. On September 16, he asked family members to check his limbs. Hearing that his limbs had gone cold, he replied: "That's good," and passed away at the age of 54.

Grieving Nguyễn Du, Minh Mạng gave him the posthumous name Trung Thanh (忠淸 Loyal and Pure). The Emperor paid death gratuity to Du's next-of-kins, and provided 20 taels of silver, two rolls of colored silk, 30 catties of wax, and 300 catties of lamp oil for his funeral. Both the Emperor's mother and one of his younger brothers were present at the funeral service.

== The Tale of Kiều ==
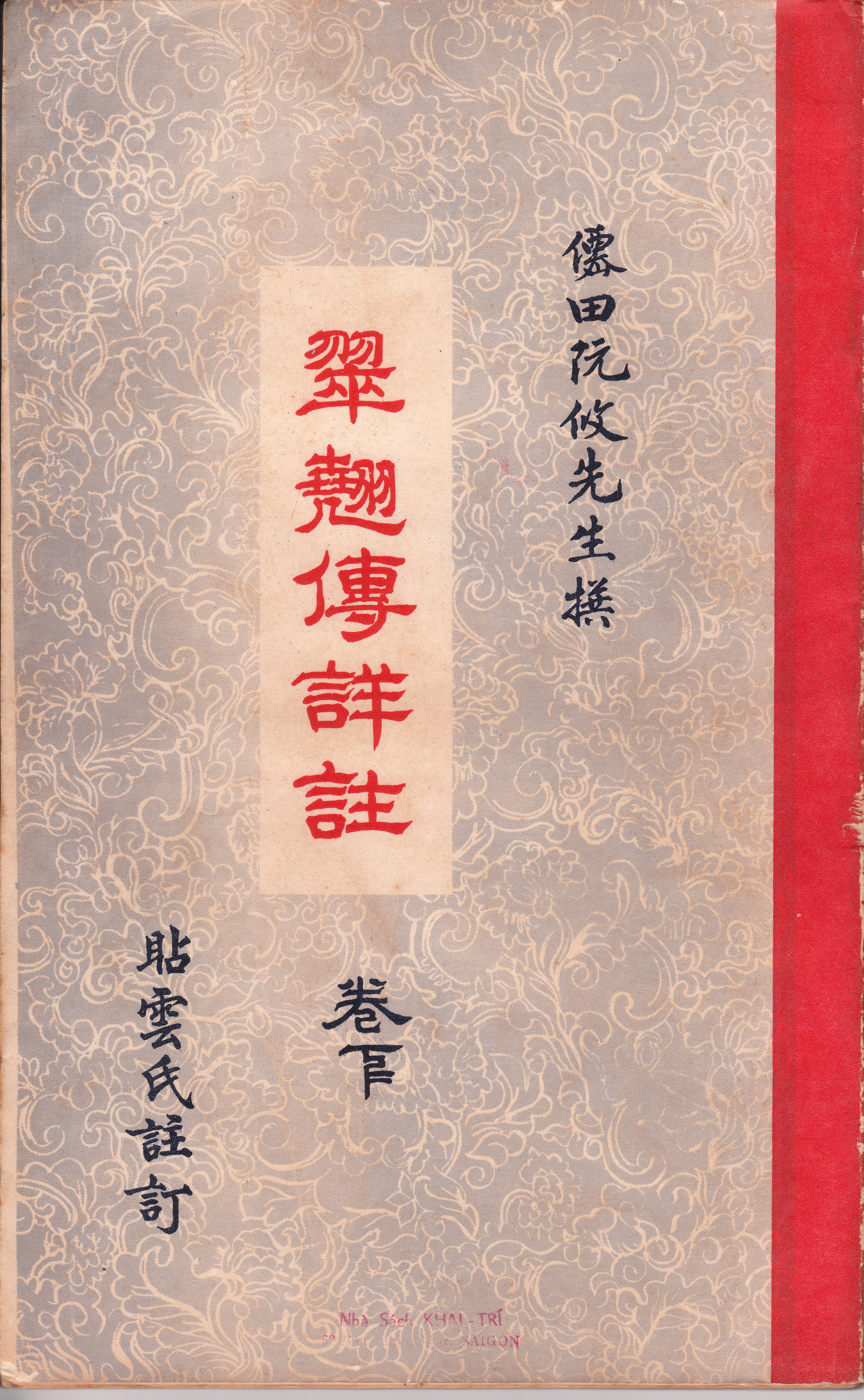
The cover of a 1967 annotated edition of The Tale of Kiều, herein titled Thuý Kiều truyện (翠翹傳).

The Tale of Kiều, originally titled Đoạn trường tân thanh (斷腸新聲, rendered as either 'A New Cry from a Broken Heart' or 'A New Cry of Heart-Rending Pain' (Note: As per Literary Chinese grammar, which is head-final, the word đoạn trường (斷腸 cut intestines) modifies the main word tân thanh (新聲 new sound/cry). Translators who choose to include the original title (rather than simply call the poem by its folk name Truyện Kiều) have taken different approaches to semantically connect this modifier with its main component: Huỳnh Sanh Thông (1983) renders đoạn trường as "a broken heart" while Nguyễn Bình (2025) chooses "of heart-rending pain".)), is commonly considered to be Nguyễn Du's masterpiece, and one of the best works of Vietnamese literature. The 3,254-line verse novel (truyện 傳) is written in lục bát, a form based on internal rhymes and tones that originates with folk songs, but has been used to write long narrative verse, even historical epics, since at least the seventeenth century. Many of Du's predecessors, including Đoàn Thị Điểm, Nguyễn Gia Thiều, and Nguyễn Huy Tự (Du's older nephew), had also composed narrative poems that combine folk forms with refined aesthetics and extensive allusions to classical East Asian traditions, in a literary movement to elevate their native language. Kiều, while paying homage to these precursors, is distinct for its preferred use of the vernacular over the more high-brow Sino-Vietnamese vocabulary that can be illegible to a less erudite audience. In many instances, Du's verse novel introduces new Vietnamese idioms—both based on Chinese counterparts and fully original—that have since become ubiquitous in common parlance.

Adapted from the late-Ming Chinese novel Jin Yun Qiao of the 'scholar-and-beauty' (才子佳人) romance genre, Kiều follows the life of Thuý Kiều (翠翹), who has vowed to marry Kim Trọng (金重), but ends up selling herself into a marriage with an older man to bail her father out of prison. This older man, introducing himself as an Imperial Academy student (監生 giám sinh), turns out to be a pimp; Kiều is thus trafficked into a brothel. Over the next fifteen years, Kiều drifts between affairs with her clients; one such client is Từ Hải (徐海), a pirate who defies the Emperor and establishes "one royal court [ruling] their own nook of heaven." After Từ Hải's death in battle against imperial troops, Kiều attempts suicide, but is saved by the nun Giác Duyên (覺緣) and reunited with her family. Kim Trọng proposes marriage again, but she refuses, citing her trauma, her loss of chastity, and insisting on becoming a nun instead. However, Kim declares that he admires her for her filial piety, and proposes a platonic partnership without sexual intimacy, which she accepts. The poem ends with an epilogue, where the narrator laments Heaven's poor treatment of the talented, and the perpetual conflict between Talent (才 tài) and Fate (命 mệnh). "Talent's a thing no haver should rely", the narrator warns, "for Talent always rimes with Tragedy", referencing a perfect rhyme between the word for talent (tài 才) and for tragedy (tai 災) in Vietnamese.

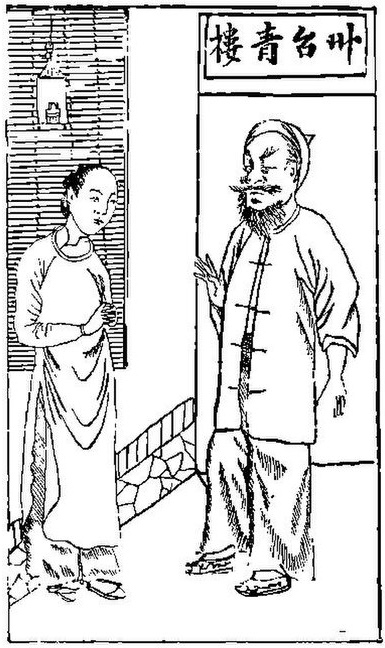
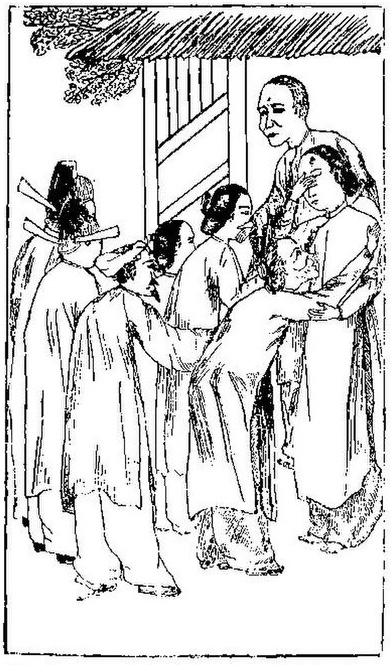
Illustrations from a 1911 Kiều edition. Left: Kiều's first meeting with Từ Hải; right: Giác Duyên reuniting Kiều with her family.

Throughout The Tale of Kiều, despite mainly sticking to the original plot, Nguyễn Du made subtle revisions that underline his social attitudes. The judicial system, which jailed Kiều's father, is portrayed as corrupt and brutal; the narrator often chimes in to decry their injustice and how through bribery, there is "no hassle to change hearts between white and black". In that same framing, Từ Hải, who in the Jin Yun Qiao is simply a ruthless pirate, turns into an ideologically driven romantic hero who rebels against the imperial order and dreams of a more just world. As for the women characters, Du depicted them with remarkable complexity. One of the poem's antagonists is Lady Hoạn (宦姐), who psychologically torments Kiều after her husband makes Kiều his mistress without her knowledge. Years after escaping the entanglement, Kiều attains a powerful enough position to take revenge on the lady, but unlike in the Jin Yun Qiao, she decides to speak directly to the lady before letting her go—a decision which many critics consider to derive from Kiều's sympathy for the lady as a fellow woman in a patriarchal society. It is these alterations that have led various modern readers to label Nguyễn Du as a humanist or a feminist.

=== Composition history ===
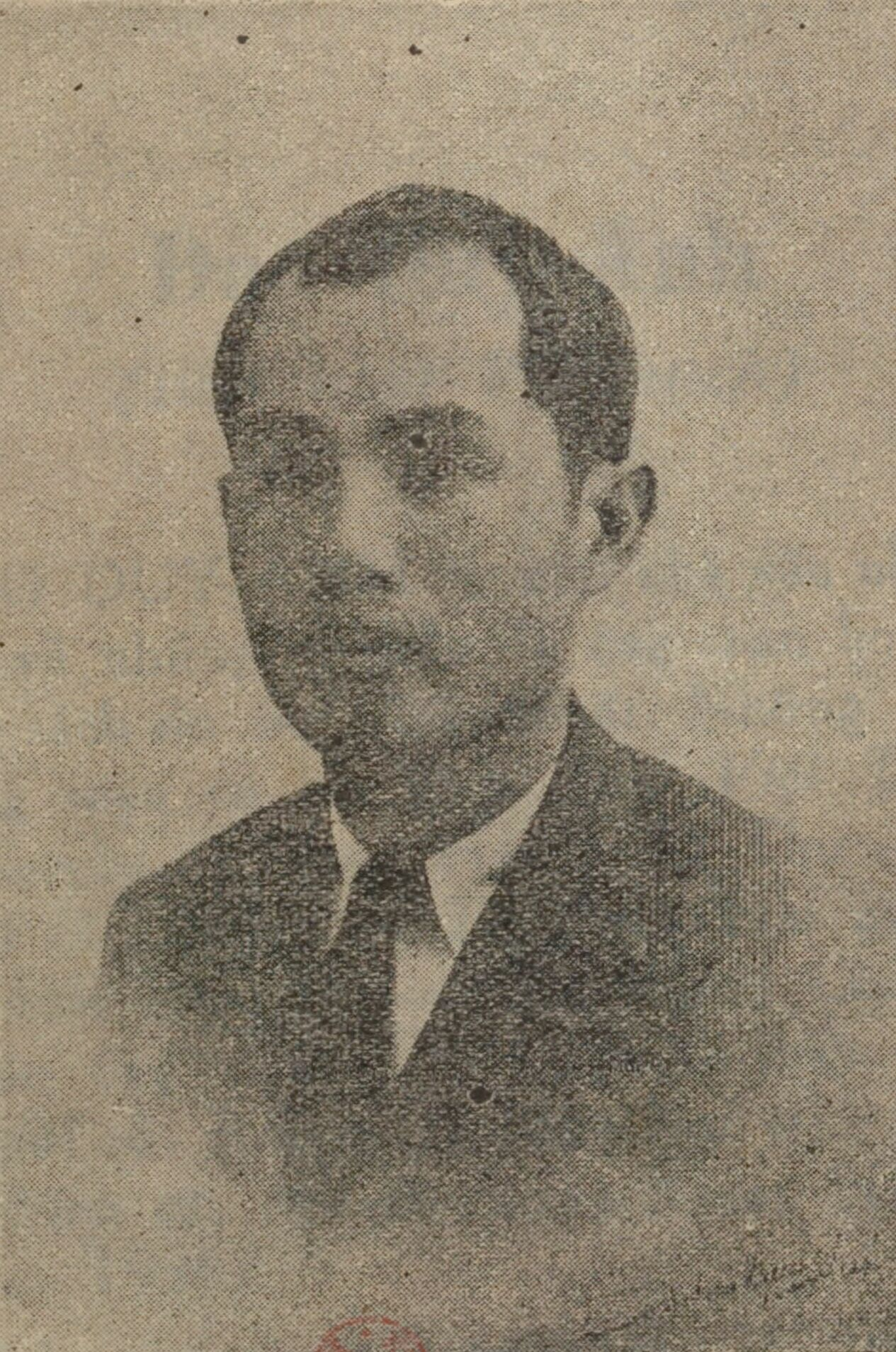
Đào Duy Anh, who first challenged the belief that Kiều was written after Nguyễn Du's 1813 mission to China.

Scholars remain divided on when Kiều was written. According to popular belief, Kiều was written after Nguyễn Du's 1813 trip to China, where he may have stumbled on the Jin Yun Qiao for the first time. The evidence comes from the Đại Nam chính biên liệt truyện, which notes that "after [Du] returned from his mission to the Qing court, Bắc hành thi tập [sic] and Thuý Kiều truyện [sic] were circulated" (自清使還以北行詩集及翠翹傳行世). Yet in 1943, historian Đào Duy Anh discovered a contemporary of Du, Nguyễn Văn Thắng, who mentioned reading the story of Thuý Kiều in 1825 from the work of the "mandarin at the Eastern Library" (quan Đông Các)—referencing the Grand Secretary position that Du held from 1805 to 1809. To Duy Anh, Thắng must have possessed an early version of Kiều, published while Du was still Grand Secretary, hence the term of address. In other words, Du must have published Kiều before at least 1809.

Recent analysis has called for pushing the date further back. Modern scholars agree that Nguyễn Huy Tự's poem Hoa tiên shares some wording with Kiều because after Kiều was finished, Du's nephew Nguyễn Thiện rewrote Hoa tiên to mimic his uncle's style. Analyzing Thiện's edition, linguist Nguyễn Tài Cẩn noticed that it does not follow the naming taboos in Nguyễn-era publications. As with other dynasties, after the Nguyễn took over, they banned the outside use of their family's birth names—that is, if a text happened to have the character of a royal person's name, that character must be replaced before printing. Yet Thiện's edition liberally includes the Nguyễn family's names; comparing it to a handwritten copy purported by Nguyễn Huy Tự's descendants to be based on his original manuscript, Nguyễn Tài Cẩn found that Thiện's edition is consistent with the naming taboos of the former Lê-Trịnh regime instead. He concluded that Nguyễn Thiện could not have edited Hoa tiên during the Nguyễn dynasty, but before it. Since Thiện based his edition on Kiều, this would reset the latter's time of completion before the founding of the Nguyễn dynasty in 1802.

There is other circumstantial evidence that Kiều was finished before the diplomatic mission. Historian Hoàng Xuân Hãn, a former believer that Kiều was written after 1813, noted how a 1902 reprint of Kiều features a commentary from Nguyễn Lượng, the prefectural magistrate of Thiên Trường (modern-day Nam Định). That same Nguyễn Lượng, according to the Đại Nam thực lục, died in battle in 1807 while trying to suppress a rebellion. Hoàng Xuân Hãn concluded that for Lượng to be able to read and leave a commentary on Kiều, the poem must have been published—or at least circulated in some capacity—well before 1807. Still, scholar Nguyễn Quảng Tuân, a hardliner for Kiều's post-1813 composition, alleged that the commentary's authorship could have been misattributed, as it never surfaced in any edition prior to 1902, almost a century after Lượng's death.

== Reception and legacy ==
=== Initial response ===
The Đại Nam thực lục, after recording his death, describes Nguyễn Du as a "Nghệ An native with broad knowledge, excellence in poetry, and even more excellence in the national language." In 1820, the same year Du died, Nguyễn Đăng Tuyển wrote a foreword to a Kiều edition, remarking: “Tố Như was painful in his intention, artful in his narration, and passionate in his expression. Without eyes that could see all six realms, or a mind that could ponder for eternity, how could anyone, even talented, have such vigorous penmanship?" Ten years later, Nguyễn Văn Thắng noted the wide circulation of Kiều, and how "not only the literati are delighted by the verse novel, but even peasant men and women, when passing the poem around orally, would fidget with excitement." The poem became such a major cultural phenomenon that by the end of the century, a foreword to another Kiều edition wrote: "There's an old saying: 'Làm trai biết đánh tổ tôm/Uống chè Chính Thái, ngâm nôm Thuý Kiều' [To be a man, you must know how to play tổ tôm, drink Chính Thái green tea, and recite the Nôm verse about Thuý Kiều]. That is refined taste."

=== Modern reevaluation ===
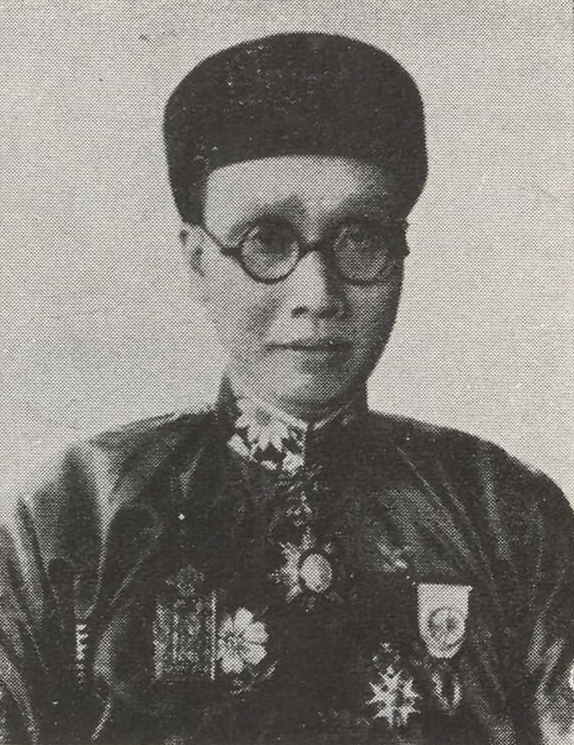
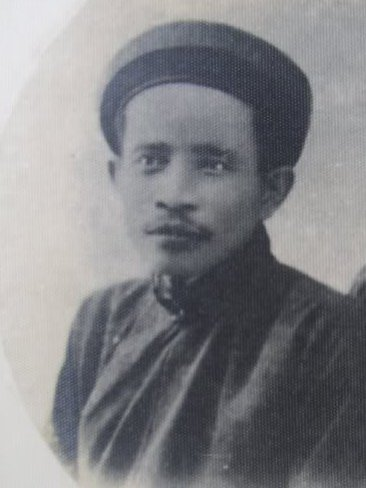
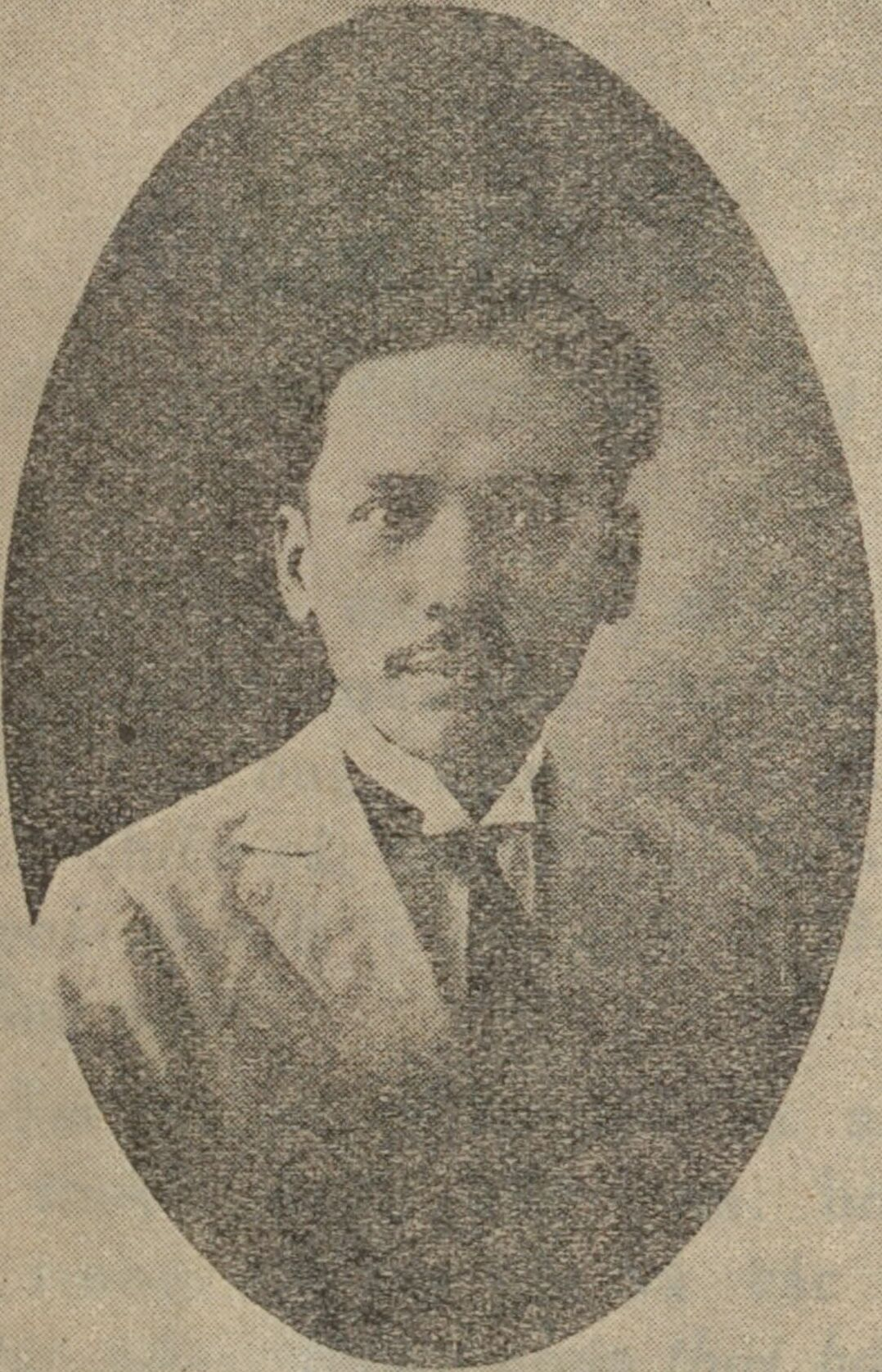
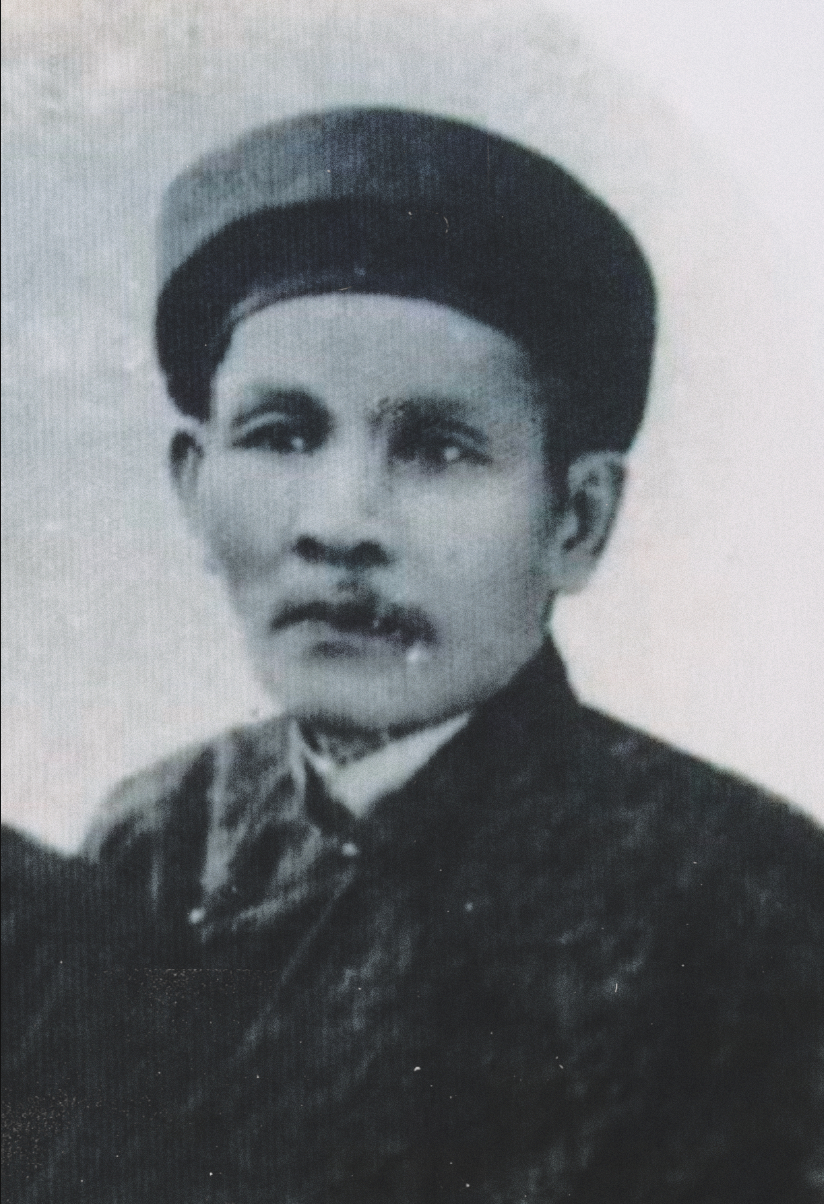
Phạm Quỳnh, Ngô Đức Kế, Huỳnh Thúc Kháng, and Phan Khôi (clockwise from upper left) were embroiled in a public debate on Nguyễn Du and The Tale of Kiều between 1924 and 1930.

With the rise of nationalism under the French occupation in the early twentieth century, attitudes around Nguyễn Du began to take on new political dimensions. In 1924, Phạm Quỳnh, a cultural critic collaborating with the French, gave a eulogy at Du's death anniversary in Hanoi, calling him "the national intellectual" (đấng quốc sĩ). Quỳnh remarked: "If The Tale of Kiều survives, then our language survives. If our language survives, then our country survives." Writing in his response essay, Ngô Đức Kế, a scholar-official formerly incarcerated on Côn Đảo for his pro-independence activism, argued that the order should be reversed: only the people's survival could ensure that of the country and the literature. He added: "Of all the heroes of great service, who saved our people, helped our country, rebuilt our land, expanded our borders—is there no one to celebrate other than some penman, who wrote a book about 'a hundred years in the world' and thus honored our race, and thus should be celebrated?"

The debate would last until 1930, involving other thinkers like Huỳnh Thúc Kháng and Phan Khôi. In his essay, Huỳnh Thúc Kháng asked: "That whore Kiều, what worth is she? The one who paints Kiều up, what merit does he have to be celebrated?" He railed against promoting the poem—with its depiction of sex work—at a time when the youth should not be indulging in lust or romance. Historian David G. Marr noted that at its core, the debate was a conflict between traditional elites and reformist thinkers who saw potential in mass mobilization against colonialism. The debate also questioned the utility of national tradition, embodied by the figure of Nguyễn Du, when said tradition not only failed to advance national liberation, but, given Phạm Quỳnh's alarming proximity to the French, was also being weaponized to pacify the people's desire for it.

During the 1940s, when the first critical analyses of Vietnamese literature were published, special attention was paid to Nguyễn Du. In his monograph Việt Năm văn học sử yếu (A Brief History of Vietnamese Literature), writer Dương Quảng Hàm read Kiều as a reflection of its author, who "reckoned himself a former subject of the Lê, but in times of national unrest failed to maintain his loyalty to the Lê emperor and had to worship the Nguyễn." This interpretation, where Kiều's enduring affection for Kim Trọng despite her affairs with other men represents Nguyễn Du's "longing for the Lê" (tâm trạng hoài Lê), would later influence modern discourse on Kiều outside of Vietnam, leading to the contested characterization of the novel as an epic poem. Meanwhile, writer Trương Tửu, drawing from Karl Marx, Sigmund Freud and Hippolyte Taine, offered a controversial reading of Nguyễn Du as a "neurotic" (con bệnh thần kinh) who suffered from emotional dysfunction, and that The Tale of Kiều "was just the crystallization of all that is debilitating in the Vietnamese spirit." While he did agree with Dương Quảng Hàm about Kiều being a representation of Du's inner feelings, he argued further that "with [the rebel pirate] Từ Hải, Nguyễn Du was able to become a hero in his delusion."

After the First Indochina War, Vietnam was split in two by the 1954 Geneva Accords. While Nguyễn Du's poetry continued to be reprinted, annotated, and interpreted in South Vietnam until 1975, the same works had a more complicated life in the North, where they were initially condemned as feudal and decadent. During the land reform, Du's descendants were forced by local cadres to burn handwritten copies of his works, before some were able to be salvaged from the fire. Public debates raged on over Du's bibliography, and whether it should be deemed national literature if so much of it was either composed in Literary Chinese or adapted from Chinese originals. Still, many Marxist thinkers came to Du's defense; in his essays on the value of traditional literature, Trần Đức Thảo highlighted the "auti-feudal" aspects of Kiều and argued for separating the verse novel's "objective meaning" about proletariat struggle from its "subjective meaning" that arose from its author's monarchist political thought. This view of Nguyễn Du as the voice of the people—a patriotic humanist aligned with the oppressed despite his own non-revolutionary limitations—would become dominant across Vietnam after reunification, and remains the official interpretation disseminated by the national secondary education curriculum to this day.

== Honors ==
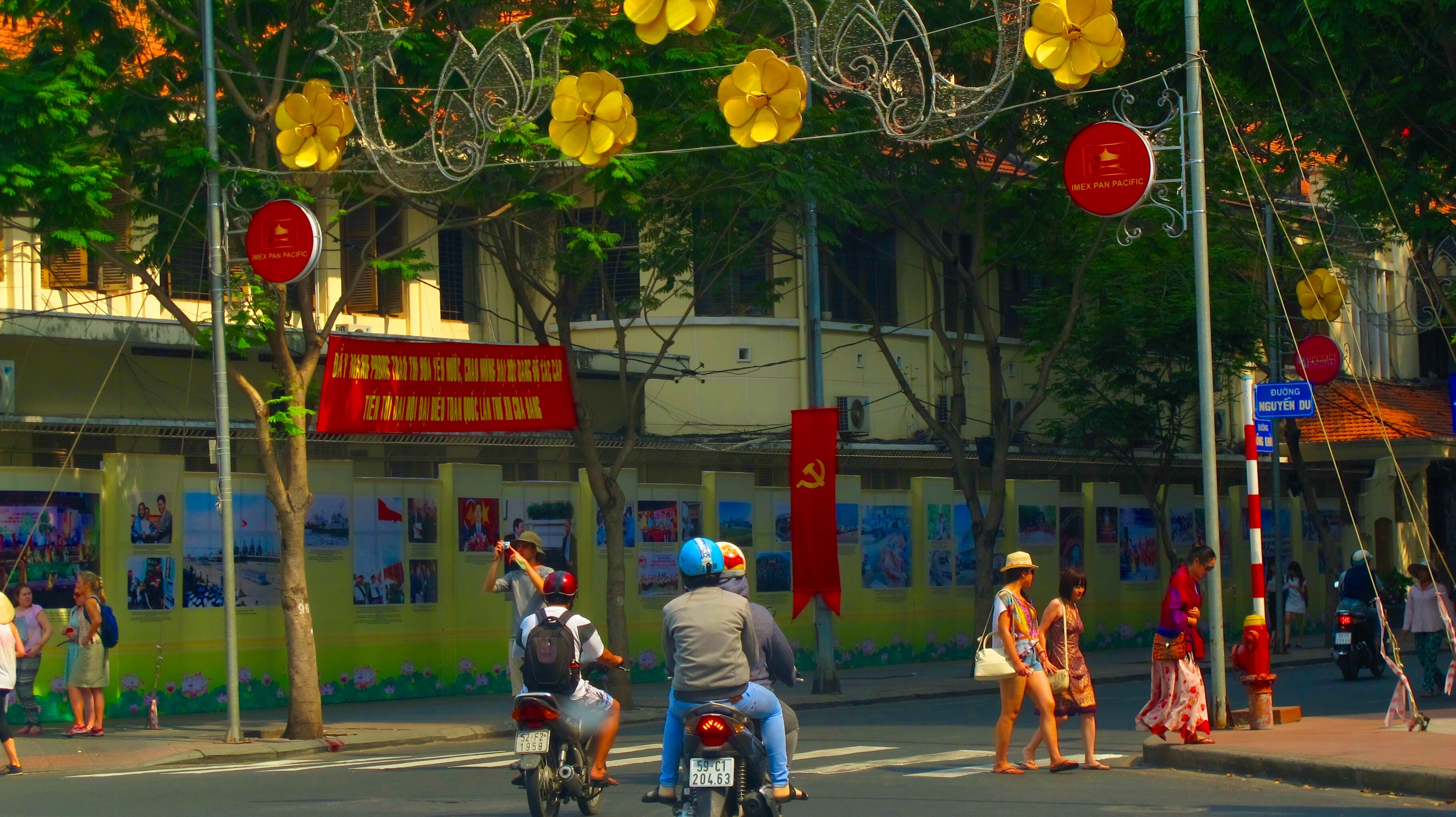
Nguyễn Du Street in Hồ Chí Minh City.

Today, Nguyễn Du is commemorated across Vietnam. Many thoroughfares are named after him in Hanoi, Huế, Đà Nẵng, and Saigon. In Hanoi, Nguyễn Du Street is famous for its row of blackboard trees planted in the French colonial period that produce fragrant blossoms at the start of autumn, inspiring their own host of poetry and music. In Saigon, the first-ever Vietnamese supermarket, founded in 1967, was called Nguyễn Du Supermarket (Siêu thị Nguyễn Du) due to its location at the intersection of Nguyễn Du and Chu Mạnh Trinh Streets. Until 2024, three wards in Hanoi, Hà Tĩnh, and Nam Định were also named after Nguyễn Du. After the 2024–2025 administrative reforms by the Communist Party, these wards were merged with neighboring localities. At the same time, the reforms created a new ward named after Nguyễn Du around the same area in Thái Bình where he stayed during his ten years of wind and dust. Additionally, his family's ancestral house in Hà Tĩnh was designated a Special National Site in 2012.

Du's name is also closely associated with modern Vietnamese literary establishments. After reunification in 1976, the Nguyễn Du Writing School (Trường Viết văn Nguyễn Du) was established as the first educational facility for young writers in the Socialist Republic. Many critically acclaimed postwar writers had their beginnings at this school, including Lâm Thị Mỹ Dạ and Bảo Ninh, the latter of whom finished his draft for The Sorrow of War while enrolled here. Since 2005, the People's Committee of Hà Tĩnh Province has also organized the Nguyễn Du Prize for Literature and Arts to support aspiring artists in prose, poetry, performance, photography, music, and architecture.

Lastly, in an ironic parallel with Du's role as a diplomatic envoy, his Tale of Kiều has even become part of modern Vietnam's symbolic diplomatic gestures with other countries. Official Vietnamese establishments have gifted translated copies of Kiều to, among others, Russia, Pakistan, and Palestine. In addition, couplets from Kiều are referenced in addresses by visiting foreign leaders, including U.S. President Bill Clinton on his historic visit to Vietnam in 2000 after reestablishing United States–Vietnam relations, and Joe Biden on his 2015 and 2023 visits.
