= Nguyễn Khản =

Vietnamese official and poet

Nguyễn Khản 阮侃

Prime Minister
- In office 1760–1787

Personal details
- Born: 1734 Tiên Điền village, Nghi Xuân district, Nghệ An region, Annam
- Died: 1787 (aged 52–53) Đông Kinh, Vietnam
- Parent(s): Nguyễn Nghiễm (father); Đặng Thị Dương (mother)
- Occupation: Politician, poet

Nguyễn Khản (Chinese: 阮侃, 1734 - 1787), courtesy name Đức Như (德如), pseudonym Thuật Hiên (述軒) or Escape Oldman at Hồng Mountain (鴻山遯翁), posthumous name Hoành-Mẫn tiên-sinh thượng-đẳng tối-linh phúc-thần (橫敏先生上等最靈福神), was an Annamese official and poet.

== Biography ==
Nguyễn Khản was born in 1734 in Tiên Điền village, Nghi Xuân district, Đức Quang prefect, Nghệ An region of the Revival Lê dynasty. He was the first child (of 21 children) of the Chancellor Nguyễn Nghiễm. Nguyễn Khản was a child of his father's first wife (of 8 women) who has a name Đặng Thị Dương, she was the second daughter of official Đặng Sĩ Vinh.

He passed the official government examination as a Jinshi in 1760 and then became a teacher of the Crown Prince Trịnh Tông. So he changed his name as Nguyễn Hân (阮欣). In 1767, lord Trịnh Sâm changed his name as Nguyễn Lệ (阮儷). In 1778, he re-changed his name as Nguyễn Khản.

== Genealogy ==
=== Family ===
- Father : Nguyễn Nghiễm (阮儼, 1708 - 1776)
- Mother : Đặng Thị Dương (鄧氏陽; courtesy name Ôn 温)
- Brothers : Nguyễn Nễ, Nguyễn Du
- Sisters :

=== Spouse ===
- Đặng Thị Vệ (1736 - 1783)
  - 2 daughters : Nguyễn Thị Bành, Nguyễn Thị Thái
- [...] Thủy (1743 - 1780)
  - 3 sons : Nguyễn Tuấn, Nguyễn Lễ, Nguyễn Hân
- ?
  - 5 sons : Nguyễn Tiệp, Nguyễn Bằng, Nguyễn Đường, Nguyễn Đảng, Nguyễn Xưng
  - 3 daughters : Nguyễn Thị Xuân, Nguyễn Thị Nga, Nguyễn Thị Hương

== See also ==
- Nguyễn Du
- Trịnh Tông
- Phạm Đình Hổ
