= The Flowery Paper =

19th-century Chinese ballad

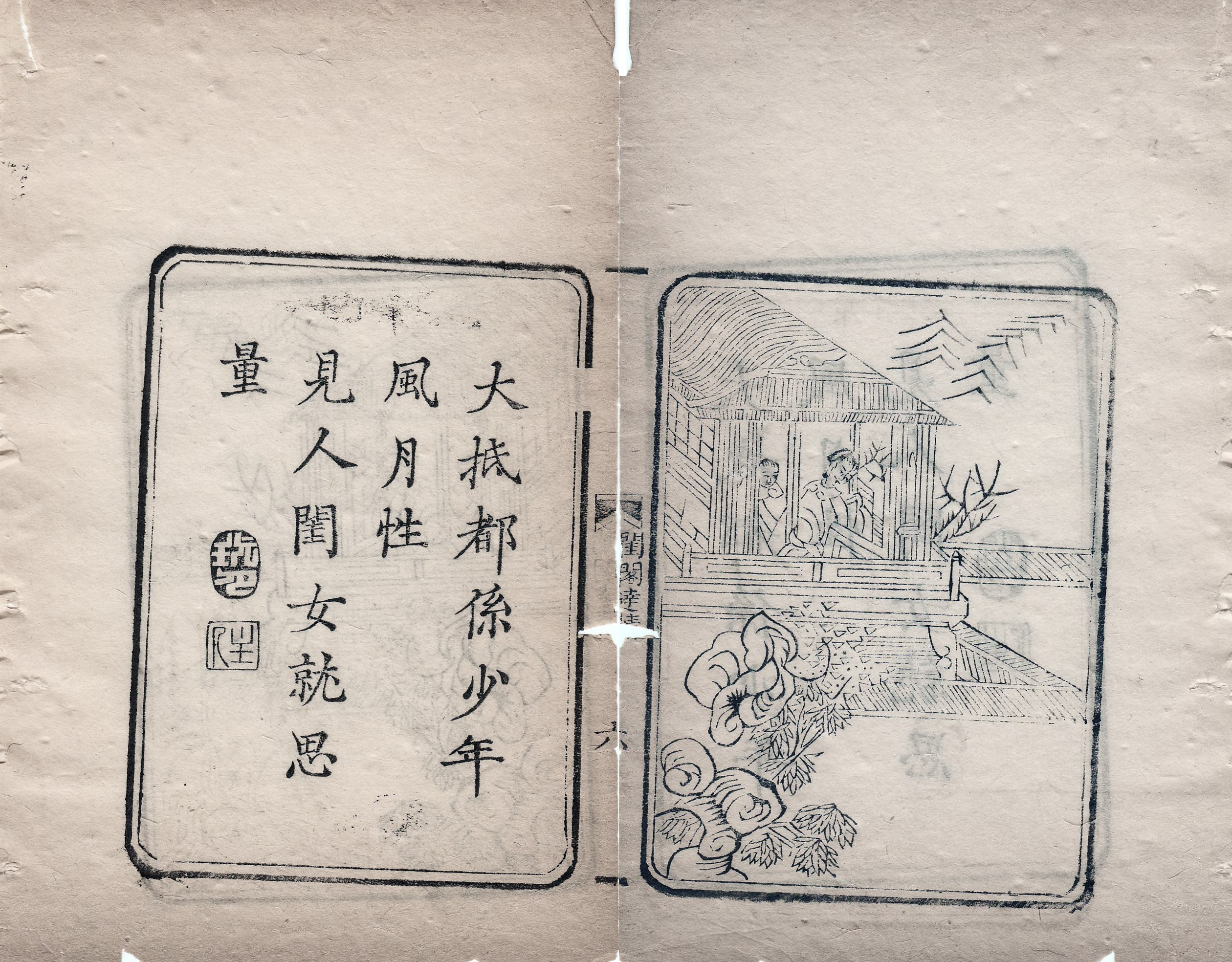
- Oldest extant copy of the book, 18th century
- Author: unknown
- Original title: 花箋記
- Language: Literary Chinese, Written Cantonese
- Genre: ballad, scholar and beauty
- Publication date: late Ming
- Publication place: Ming China
- English publication date: 1824

The Flowery Paper or Faazin Gei (Chinese: 花箋記; pinyin: Huājiān Jì; Jyutping: Faa^{1}zin^{1} Gei^{3}), also translated as The Flowery Scroll, is a Chinese mukjyusyu style ballad written in the late Ming era. It is the earliest known work containing elements of written Cantonese. This book was also of particular interest to early European Sinology. Along with Iu-Kiao-Li, it is regarded as one of the most influential Chinese books for 19th century European writers.

== Name ==
In addition to The Flowery Paper, variants of English title mentioned in various works include:

- The Flower's Leaf
- The Flowery Scroll
- The Flowered Letter-Paper
- The Floral Writing Paper
- The Flowery Notepaper
- The Flowery Billet
- The Flowered Stationery
- Story of the flower-letter
- The Flowery Letterhead
- Romance of the Fancy Notepaper
- Record of the billet-doux

The subtitle "The Eighth Outstanding Work" (Chinese: 第八才子書; pinyin: Dì Bā Cáizǐ-shū; Jyutping: Dai^{6} Baat^{3} Coi^{4}zi^{2}-syu^{1}) implies that this book is a part of a certain canon with ten or eleven books included. Such canons are extensions over more traditional "Six Outstanding Works" (六才子書).

== Composition ==
The oldest extant edition of Faazin Gei is dated 52nd year of the Kangxi Emperor (1713/1714), but the consensus of the scholars is that it was first published during the late Ming dynasty (17th, or even 16th century). Zheng Zhenduo, who found that edition in the Bibliothèque nationale de France in 1927, noted that some characters are seemingly extracted from the text — those were politically tabooed under the Qing, particularly, 番 (barbarian) and 胡 (steppe nomad). This oldest edition already contained fine commentary by Zung Daaicong (鍾戴蒼, also known as Zung Jingsyut 鍾映雪, 1683-1768), and a preface by Zyu Gwongzang (朱光曾), and was one of the three main forms in which the text circulated, along with an illustrated and annotated edition (its earliest extant version is dated 1771) and a cheap 19th century performance script.

The Flowery Paper was once mistakenly attributed to the early medieval period by Zhao Yiheng (赵毅衡), a renowned Chinese writer and translator, who referred to the Thoms's translation as "the earliest anthology of Tang poetry in English". He likely confused Faazin Gei with an unrelated 10th century work, Huajian Ji (花間集), whose title has the same Mandarin pinyin romanization.

The author of the book is unknown, but he was clearly an educated person with a literary background. The early commentary by Zung Daaicong, referenced also by Thoms, claims that there were rumors about "two Cantonese people" who composed the ballad, a scholar with a gaaijyun rank (解元, a person ranked first in provincial exam), and another one with a taamfaa rank (探花, ranked third in imperial exam).

Besides the preface, absent in some editions, the ballad contains 59 sections, also termed "songs". Each song line contains seven characters, just like tanci, a similar song form found in other regions of China.

The book's format is usually termed mukjyusyu. This is a general term for songbooks containing songs in various genres, including mukjyugo, naamyam, and lungzau. It's hard to draw a clear boundary between them, and many editions of the book and even academic studies use the terms naamyam or mukjyugo to describe it. The naamyam songs were usually accompanied by string instruments, while the mukjyugo were performed without music, only simple percussion instruments like wooden fish might be used. Some scholars also say that the naamyam songs are longer than mukjyugo , and lungzau is the shortest form.

== Influence ==
要想癲，唱花箋; 要想傻，唱二荷; 要想哭，唱金葉菊

If you want to go crazy, chant The Flowery Scroll,
if you want to become a fool, chant The Two Lotuses,
if you want to shed tears, chant The Golden Chrysanthemum Petals

— Old Dongguan proverb

The Flowery Paper has long been popular in the Guangdong region. Generally, songbooks were regarded there as a low genre, but this book gained unusually high prestige even among the educated public. It was partially thanks to the recommendations given by Zung Daaicong and Zyu Gwongzang. In his preface, Zyu says that initially the literati sneered at him for recommending a book that "even village boys or vulgar women could read", but he became committed to change their mind.

The text is an early attempt in introducing vernacular Cantonese speech into the literary language. Its language is still deeply influenced by the literary Chinese, the main written language of the time, but it also contains a considerable amount of uniquely Cantonese characters and wording.

Copies of Faazin Gei made their way to Japan, and in Vietnam, the ballad was adapted as Hoa tiên 花箋 by Nguyễn Huy Tự (1743-1790) using the vernacular lục bát verse form and was later revised by Nguyễn Thiện (1763-1818). Some scholars even propose a view that The Flowery Paper, and mukjyusyu genre in general, significantly influenced Northern Chinese and Manchu song traditions, such as zidishu ballads.

The Flowery Paper was widely read not only in Asia, but also in the West. The famous German poet Johann Wolfgang von Goethe read the Thoms's English parallel translation and, inspired by it, composed his Chinese-German Book of Hours and Seasons (1827). And even as late as the 1990s, Faazin Gei was among the best-selling mukjyusyu in New York Chinese community.

== Translations ==
The first English translation of the Faazin Gei was Chinese Courtship in Verse, 1824, by Peter Perring Thoms. The book is sometimes considered the first direct English translation of a rhymed Chinese piece of considerable length. Criticized for poor English then and poor understanding of Chinese now, Thoms nevertheless attracted a vivid interest internationally with his work. Some sources claim there also was a Russian translation from the English, but it was in fact merely a review in Moskovskiĭ Telegraf, 11, 1826, itself translated from a French review by Jean-Pierre Abel-Rémusat. Other English translations are a rhyming version by John Chalmers in Notes and Queries on China and Japan, 1867, and Hwa tsien ki. The Flowery Scroll: A Chinese Novel, 1868 by John Bowring. It was translated into German by Heinrich Kurz as Das Blumenblatt, eine epische Dichtung der Chinesen, aus dem Original, 1836, also being the first full-length translation of any Chinese literary text into German. The Dutch translation, Hoa tsien ki, of Geschiedenis van het gebloemde briefpapier: Chinesche roman, 1865, was conducted by Gustaaf Schlegel. Fragments of the book in French were published as Fa-Tsien, "Les billets doux", 1876, by Léon de Rosny.
