= Phố Hiến =

- Ward
- Center of Phố Hiến Ward
- Interactive map of Phố Hiến
- Coordinates: 20.659733868864745°N 106.06353225096203°E
- Country: Vietnam
- Region: Red River Delta
- Province: Hưng Yên province
- Established: 16 June 2025
- Administrative headquarters: Triệu Quang Phục, Phố Hiến University Urban Area

Area
  - Total: 21.50 km^{2} (8.30 sq mi)

Population (2025)
  - Total: 68,982
  - Density: 3,208/km^{2} (8,310/sq mi)

Phố Hiến is a ward and the administrative center of Hưng Yên province, Vietnam. The Phố Hiến Relic Complex is located within the ward.

During the French colonial period, the area of present-day Phố Hiến was the center of Hưng Yên town. Following the August Revolution, Hưng Yên town continued to serve as the provincial seat of Hưng Yên province for the next 80 years, eventually developing into Hưng Yên City. As part of the 2025 Vietnamese administrative reform, Hưng Yên City ceased to operate from 1 July 2025. The former An Tảo, Lê Lợi, Hiến Nam, and Minh Khai wards, together with Trung Nghĩa and Liên Phương communes, all formerly part of Hưng Yên City, were merged to form a new ward named Phố Hiến. The name Phố Hiến thus became an official administrative place name for the first time.
