= Nguyễn Quảng Tuân =

Vietnamese writer and poet

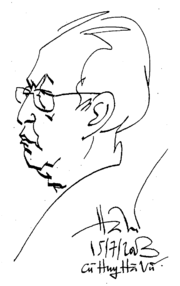
- Portrait c. 2003
- Born: 11 June 1925; Quế Võ, Bắc Ninh Province, French Indochina
- Died: 20 May 2019 (aged 93)

Nguyễn Quảng Tuân (Chữ Hán: 阮廣詢) (June 11, 1925 – May 20, 2019) was a writer, poet and researcher in South Vietnam. He was born in the village of Yên Mẫn, the district Võ Giàng (now district of Quế Võ), the province of Bắc Ninh, northern Vietnam.

== Background ==
Nguyễn Quảng Tuân, who was born on June 11, 1925, in Hanoi, already had poems published in Tia Sang and Thoi su Chu Nhat during his studies at Bưởi School. He also wrote a play in verse, The Sound of Flute on the O River, which was performed twice: the first time on 4&5 May 1946 in the Grand Theater in Ha Noi and the second time on 23 & 24 of May, 1946 in Hà Tĩnh's local theater. He became a teacher at Ngô Quyền High School, Hải Phòng, in 1949, and by 1953 he had his Collection of Poems by Chu Mạnh Trinh and Thanh Tâm Tài Nhân published. He then had his mind set on studying The Tale of Kiều by Nguyễn Du. After he was promoted to headmaster of Duy Tân high school in Phan Rang, he had his series of Vietnamese Literature textbooks successively published – grade 6 to 12 – as well as A Concise Comparative Spelling Dictionary.

After 1975, Nguyễn Quảng Tuân started his studies in Hán Nôm characters, especially The Tale of Kiều, of which he had collected many ancient Nôm scripts.

The favourite genre of Nguyễn is hát nói and he is famous for his works of ca trù. Following are comments from Professor Trần Văn Khê, a well-known specialist in Vietnamese traditional music: "Reading Vịnh Kiều was such a surprise and delight. I know very well that Nguyễn Quảng Tuân is an expert in Kiều, but all his Kiều odes in hát nói genre are beyond my expectations. Writing 20 odes for the 20 episodes in the Tale of Kiều plus 6 odes for its 6 characters is no simple work. Such literary achievement must come from a poet who has not only deep understanding of Kiều but also comfortable use of the hát nói genre."

Professor Trần Văn Khê is very accurate in his description of Nguyễn Quảng Tuân, both as a scholar and a poet. Following is a Đường luật poem in which Tuân goes over his life story in eight simple lines:

"Years of happiness in school environments
Months and days of passion for literary arts.
Ngô Quyền used to fill my soul with romance
Võ Tánh saw my hair turn grey.
Headmaster was I once in the land of sand and dust
Teacher was I twice in the hometown of weeping willows.
Inspector am I now at the ministry
Pleased to be among loving fellows."

Tuân was invited to sit as head judge in the Judge Committee of the Gold Book Contest held every two years. To research Nguyễn Du's career, Tuân spent many years travelling to France, England, US, Japan and China in search of documents and Nôm scripts of The tale of Kiều. In France, Tuân asked for a copy of Kim Vân Kiều tân truyện inscribed in 1871 at Liễu Vân Đường's request. That was the only Nôm copy left, now stored in the Inter-university Library of Oriental Languages in France. In the US, he obtained from Professor Đàm Quang Hưng a copy of Đoạn trường tân thanh, revised, then copied by Hoàng Giáp Tiểu Tô Lâm – Nọa Phu – Nguyễn Hữu Lập at Tây hiên Ministry of Construction, Huế. This original copy of Truyện Kiều has now been sent to the Kiều expert, Nguyễn Quảng Tuân, by Professor Đàm Quang Hưng, so he can show it to those who need more information about it or who would like to see things with their own eyes. In England, he was able to hold a handwritten copy of Kim Vân Kiều tân truyện with illustrations on every page and notes in Chinese. At the British Library, he was not allowed to copy the whole book but only a few pages for his personal library. In China, he traveled from Beijing to Hàng Châu, visiting the Tien Duong river to get to know more about the locations of Thúy Kiều's eventful life, and "to live the soul of each word of the book", as stated by Professor Dr. Mai Quốc Liên. In Vietnam, Tuân visited Nguyễn Du's paternal hometown in Tiên Điền, Nghi Xuân of Hà Tĩnh province. On the occasion, he wrote the following eulogy in honour of Nguyễn Du:

Hồng Sơn family history
Widely reputed was Nguyễn of Tiên Điền
Not as minister or top exam candidate
But for his Tale of Kiều, a rare event.
Living with great talents, without shame
Bequeathing a glorious career of a hundred years
On duty in Beijing
On a chance encounter with Thanh Tâm Tài Tử
At a hearsay about a devoted daughter
With sympathy for the emotional Thúy Kiều
He turned the story into a wonderful Nôm masterpiece
As in Phan Thạch Sơ's comparison:
In the Minh dynasty there lived a well-known woman
In Đại Việt there was a book with eternally beautiful words.
Such is Tố Như's reputation.

And on November 15, 2004, on a trip to his own hometown – Yên Mẫn, Võ Giàng of Bắc Ninh province – Tuân also headed for Nguyễn Du's maternal hometown – Kim Thiều (previously known as Hoa Thiều), Từ Sơn (previously called Đông Ngàn) of the same town, in search of more documents. Following is an extract from Quê Mẹ (Maternal hometown), which he wrote during the trip:

All through childhood
All over the Northern capital of folk songs
His soul was filled with passionate romance.
His talent bloomed sublimely
Into lovely lullabies that stay in babies' hearts.

During his trips in search of documents, he was lucky enough to meet Mr. Đinh Sỹ Hồng – head of the committee in charge of Nguyễn Du's commemoration. From him, Tuân obtained a copy of Kim Vân Kiều tân truyện, which Liễu Văn Đường had inscribed in 1866. This copy, discovered in Nghệ An in May, 2004, is now considered the oldest in the collection of Kiều's Nôm scripts. The Kiều expert, Mr. Nguyễn Quảng Tuân, immediately took to the transcribing, contrasting and annotating work, which was published by the Cultural House and Center of National Studies in September, 2004. Following is an extract from "The tale of Kiều. The oldest Nôm copy of 1886: A valuable literary work" (Jan. 5, 2005) by professor Trần Thanh Đạm: "Scholar Nguyễn Quảng Tuân, expert in Hán Nôm linguistics and literature, is well-known for his great collection of ancient scripts of Vietnamese literature, especially those of The tale of Kiều. As a result, the devoted researcher has now in hand almost all Nôm scripts of Kiều. This is a blessing which he deserves… Scholar Nguyễn Quảng Tuân is also appreciated for his use of modern computer technology: thanks to it, he has always provided us with Hán Nôm copies of good quality, well printed, accurate and so convenient for inspection and use by researchers."

Tuân has spent 40 years collecting Nôm scripts of The tale of Kiều inscribed in wood one or two hundred years ago. This collection has made it possible to contrast the different copies and add appropriate annotations. As a result, the version of The tale of Kieu can now be revised to be as close as possible to Nguyễn Du's original.

As stated above, Nguyễn Quảng Tuân is not only the expert in Kiều but also a poet. He published his verses in five books: Tiếng tri âm (Voice of a friend, including many verses in hát nói genre); Ca trù: Thú xưa tao nhã (Ca Trù, the refined entertainment of old days); Ca trù: Hồn thơ dân tộc (Ca trù, the poetic Soul of the people); Ca trù: Cung bậc tri âm (Ca trù: the musical notes of a friend) and Tập Kiều, vịnh Kiều (written in hát nói genre)

Professor Trần Văn Khê also had remarks on Nguyễn Quảng Tuân's works on Ca trù: "As a poet, Nguyễn Quảng Tuân not only expressed the feelings of the past generations but also expands the inspiring topics. He was not only inspired by beautiful sceneries within the country like Hùng temple, Hạ Long and many famous pagodas. He also wrote many odes praising the Eiffel tower, the Concorde Square during his visit to Paris. When he visited the US, he praised the state of California, the Pacific coast line and Washington, D.C. In China, he climbed the Great Wall, meeting the challenge that a great man should visit the Great Wall. When he composed about this construction he mentioned its historical background… Based on the number of hát nói poems written before 2000 and recently, I can conclude that Nguyễn Quảng Tuân has composed the most hát nói works in great diversity. I would like to express my deep admiration for the erudition and creative mind of this very special author, poet and researcher on ca trù."

The Nôm Preservation Foundation honored Nguyễn Quảng Tuân with the "Balaban Award" for his outstanding contribution to Nôm studies in 2010.

== Artwork ==
- Chu Mạnh Trinh và Thanh Tâm Tài Nhân Thi Tập (1953)
- Bộ sách Giảng Văn bậc trung học (1957–1973)
- Giản Yếu Chính Tả Tự Vị Dối Chiếu (1958)
- Phan Văn Trị: Con Người và Tác Phẩm (1986. Soạn chung với Nguyễn Khắc Thuần)
- Từ Ngữ Thơ Văn Nguyễn Đình Chiểu (1987. Soạn chung với Nguyễn Khắc Thuần)
- Từ Điển Lục Vân Tiên (1989. Soạn chung với Nguyễn Khắc Thuần)
- Thơ Đường (Tản Đà dịch): Sưu Tầm, Hiệu Đính, Dịch Nghĩa, Chú Thích (1989. Tái bản 2002)
- Những Ngôi Chùa Danh Tiếng (1990)
- Từ Điển Các Từ Tiếng Việt Gốc Pháp (1992)
- Những Ngôi Chùa ở Thành Phố Hồ Chí Minh (1993)
- Những Ngôi Chùa ở Nam Bộ (1994)
- Tổng Tập Văn Học Việt Nam: Truyện Kiều – Chiêu Hồn (Tập 12)
- Tổng Tập Văn Học Việt Nam: Hoa Tiên – Sơ Kính Tân Trang – Mai Đình Mộng Ký (Tập 13A)
- Tổng Tập Văn Học Việt Nam: Chinh Phụ Ngâm Khúc – Cung Oán Ngâm Khúc – Ai Tư Vãn – Thư Dạ Lữ Hoài Ngâm – Tự Tình Khúc – Tỳ Bà Hành – Trường Hận Ca – Chúc Cẩm Hồi Văn (Tập 13B)
- Chữ Nghĩa Truyện Kiều – Khảo Luận (1994)
- Truyện Kiều: Khảo Đính và Chú Giải (1995)
- Nguyễn Du Toàn Tập (Soạn chung với Giáo Sư Tiến Sĩ Mai Quốc Liên) (1996)
- Nguyễn Trãi Toàn Tập - Tân Biên (Soạn chung với Giáo sư Tiến sĩ Mai Quốc Liên, ...) (1999)
- Tìm Hiểu Nguyễn Du và Truyện Kiều – Biên Khảo (2000)
- Truyện Kiều: (Bản Nôm) Liễu Văn Đường −1871, Phiên Âm và Khảo Dị (2002)
- Truyện Kiều: (Bản Kinh) Bản Viết Tay – 1870, Phiên Âm và Khảo Dị (2003)
- Truyện Kiều: (Bản Nôm) Cổ Nhất – 1866, Phiên Âm, Khảo Dị và Chú Thích (2004)
- Truyện Kiều: (Bản Nôm) Bản Duy Minh Thị – 1891(1872) (2010)
- Tiếng Tri Âm: Thơ – Ca Trù (2000)
- Tập Kiều: Vịnh Kiều – Ca Trù (Sáng tác) (2002)
- Ca Trù – Thú Xưa Tao Nhã (2003)
- Ca Trù – Hồn Thơ Dân Tộc (2005)
- Ca Trù – Cung Bậc Tri Âm (2007)
- Ca Trù – Thơ Nhạc Giao Duyên (2008)
- Lục Vân Tiên – Bản Nôm Cổ Nhất (2008)
- More than 400 research articles published in magazines at home and abroad: Journal of Literature in Hanoi, Magazines Han Nom, Enlightenment Weekly Report, Tập Văn (Central Committee Cultural Buddhist Church of Vietnam), Magazines Traveller, Arts Magazine, Knowledge Magazine Today, Journal of Research and Development (Huế), Vietnam Soul, ...
