= Trần Trọng Kim =

Vietnamese scholar and politician (1883–1953)

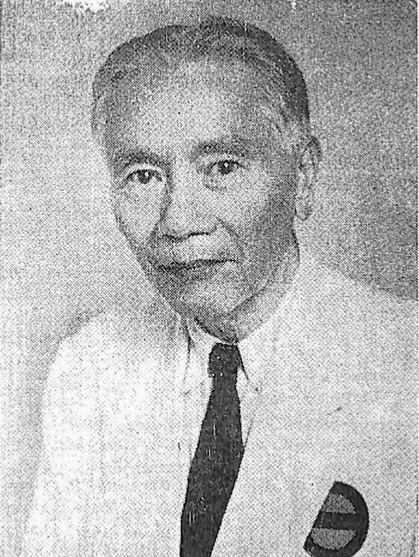

Chief of Cabinet of the Empire of Vietnam
- In office 17 April 1945 – 25 August 1945
- Monarch: Bảo Đại
- Deputy: Trần Văn Chương
- Preceded by: Position established
- Succeeded by: Phan Anh; Hồ Chí Minh (as President of the DRV)

Personal details
- Born: 1883 Nghi Xuân, Hà Tĩnh, Đại Nam
- Died: 2 December 1953 (aged 70) Đà Lạt, State of Vietnam
- Spouse: Bùi Thị Tuất
- Children: Trần Diệu Chương (daughter)
- Profession: Scholar, educator

Trần Trọng Kim (Vietnamese: [t͡ɕən˨˩ t͡ɕawŋ͡m˧˨ʔ kim˧˧]; chữ Hán: 陳仲金, Kanji pronunciation: Chin Jūkin; Japanese: チャン・チョン・キム, romanized: Chan Chon Kimu; 1883 – December 2, 1953; courtesy name Lệ Thần ([le˧˨ʔ tʰən˨˩], chữ Hán: 隸臣) was a Vietnamese scholar and politician who served as the Prime Minister of the short-lived Empire of Vietnam, a state established with the support of Imperial Japan in 1945 after Japan had seized direct control of Vietnam from Vichy France toward the end of World War II. He was an uncle of Bùi Diễm.

== Early years ==
Kim was born in Nghi Xuân, Hà Tĩnh Province, in northern central Đại Nam (as Vietnam was known then) in 1883 during the Nguyen dynasty. At the time, Hà Tĩnh was part of the central region, which had become a French protectorate under the name of Annam. In the immediate decade afterwards, the province was the scene of a guerrilla movement led by Phan Đình Phùng that attempted to expel the French authorities. The movement was particularly popular in the Nghệ An-Hà Tĩnh region, which had boasted a long line of nationalist icons.

Nevertheless, the movement was crushed, and when Kim grew up, he initially studied in Hanoi at schools reserved for the ruling elite. He then worked in the public service of the French administration. Kim's early career was as an interpreter, serving in Ninh Bình in northern Vietnam, then known as the protectorate of Tonkin. In 1905, Kim was sent to France as an employee of a private company. In 1908, he won a scholarship from the École Coloniale (Colonial School) to begin his training as a teacher at the École Normale of Melun (Seine-et-Marne). Kim returned to Vietnam in September 1911, commenced his career as a teacher in Annam and slowly rose in the educational hierarchy. By 1942, he had risen to become an inspector of elementary public instruction in Tonkin. He wrote many works on pedagogy and started a review on the topic. Kim was also a freemason.

== Academia ==
In contrast to his career as a politician, Kim was widely known as a scholar for a collection of textbooks published in the Vietnamese alphabet (chữ Quốc Ngữ), especially for his writings on Confucianism, Buddhism and Vietnamese history.

His two best known works were Việt Nam sử lược (A Brief history of Vietnam), published in 1920, and Nho giáo (Confucianism), published in 1929–1933. In the first book, Kim emphasised the Chinese influence on Vietnamese society. The latter book dealt with examining Confucianism in China and its impact on Vietnam. Kim strongly praised Confucianism, and his book provoked much intellectual debate on the philosophy's place in Vietnamese society. Nho giáo was seen as a link between the generations of scholars who were brought up under the Confucian examination system of pre-French Vietnam and those who grew up under the French system. Việt Nam Sử Lược remains in print as of 2009.

His reputation in literary circles made Kim a leading figure in the Buddhist and Confucian associations, and in 1939, he was appointed to the Chamber of People's Representatives in Tonkin. He was made a chevalier of the Legion of Honour and listed in a French publication in 1943 that profiled prominent figures in French Indochina.

== World War II ==
After the outbreak of World War II, Japan continued its military conquest of Asia. It invaded and annexed Indochina into its Greater East Asia Co-Prosperity Sphere in 1940–1941. As France had fallen to Nazi Germany, the colonial administration in Vietnam of Admiral Jean Decoux was loyal to the Axis collaborationist Vichy France of Marshal Philippe Pétain. As Vichy France was nominally allied to Japan, the French administration was left in charge of the day-to-day affairs of French Indochina, with the Japanese overseeing them.

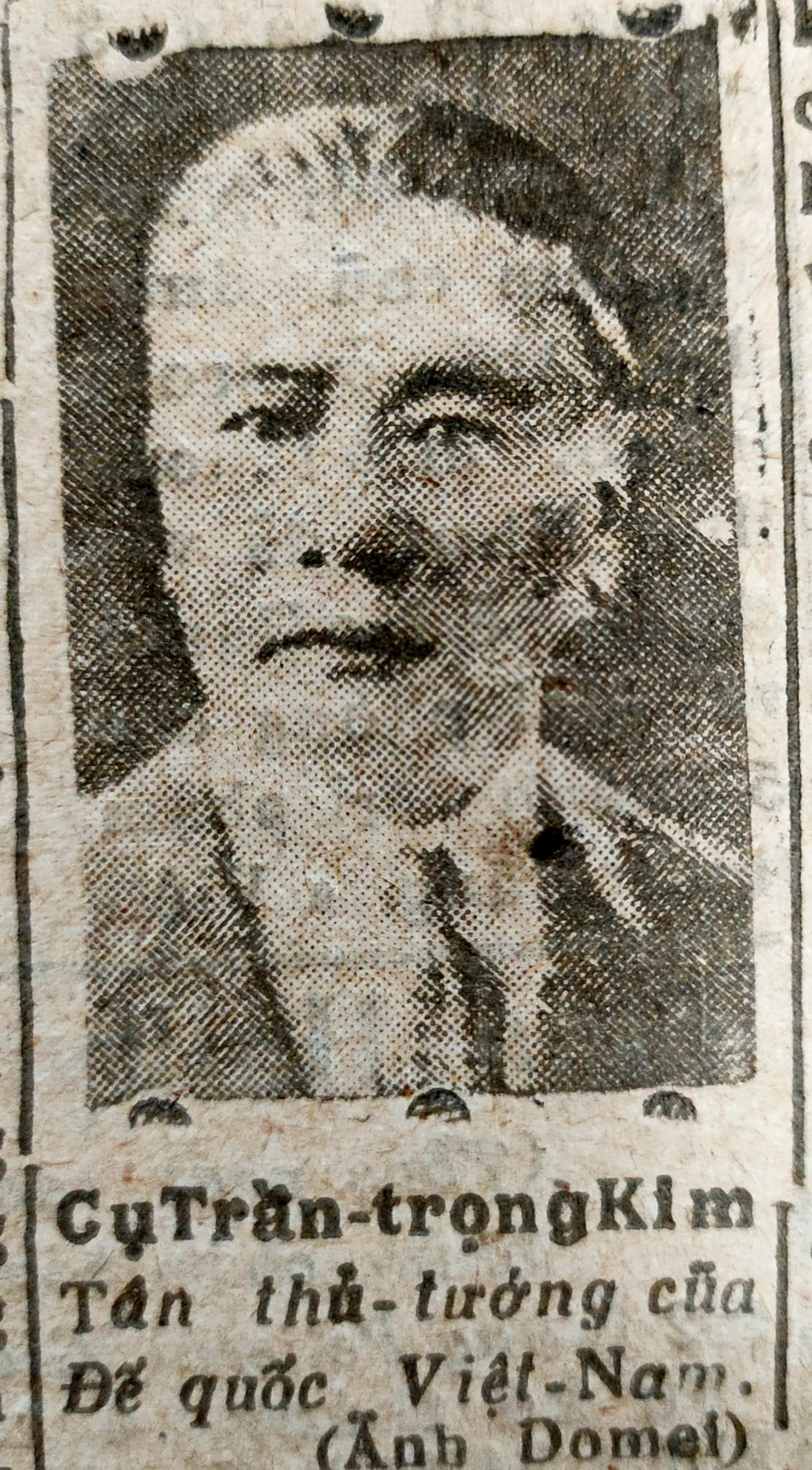
Trần Trọng Kim, new prime minister of Empire of Vietnam. Photo by Dōmei Tsushin.

In the early 20th century, Japan was also seen by many Vietnamese as a promoter of Asian nationalism, and many Vietnamese nationalists had traveled to Japan in an attempt to further the Vietnamese independence movement. Kim was approached by several Japanese experts in Vietnamese studies. The contacts and his ties to a progressive organisation in Hanoi made Kim politically suspect to the Decoux administration. When Decoux implemented his second major purge of pro-Japanese Vietnamese in the autumn of 1943, Kim was reported to be on the list of the Sûreté (Criminal Investigation Department). On October 28, 1943, Japanese agents escorted Kim to the Kenpeitai (military police) office in Hanoi and put him under protection. There, Kim was joined by Dương Bá Trạc, a co-editor on a dictionary that was currently being written. According to Kim's account, Trạc persuaded him to co-sign a letter applying for an evacuation to Singapore. At the beginning of November, the Japanese escorted them to Saigon. After briefly living at the Kenpeitai office, they became the guests of Dainan Kōshi, a Japanese business firm owned by Matsushita Mitsuhiro, which was known as a front for intelligence operations.

On January 1, 1944, Kim and Trạc boarded a Japanese vessel headed for Singapore. According to Ellen Hammer, the French threat to Kim appeared "to have been a wholly illusory French menace". After spending just over a year on the island, and following Trạc's death from lung cancer in December 1944, Kim was transferred to Bangkok. Three months later, on March 30, 1945, he was unexpectedly recalled to Saigon by the Japanese to be consulted on "history". That came after Captain Michio Kuga from the Japanese Army's liaison office in Saigon was flown to Bangkok for talks.

By now, the Liberation of Paris in August 1944 and the fall of Vichy France meant that Japan could no longer depend on the French colonial administration to co-operate. As a result, they assumed direct control of Indochina by deposing the French in a coup on March 9 and declared Vietnam to be independent under the newly created Empire of Vietnam with Bảo Đại, Vietnam's titular monarch, as its head of state. Japan however, maintained military control. Bảo Đại was then charged with selecting a prime minister and a cabinet. It was believed that Bảo Đại sent a message to Ngô Đình Diệm, who was then living under Japanese protection in Saigon, in asking him to form a government. However, the message never arrived, which was put down to Japanese concerns that Diệm would seek to govern independently, rather than toe the Japanese line.

Arriving in Saigon, he met with General Saburo Kawamura, Chief of Staff of the Japanese Indochina Garrison Army and Lieutenant Colonel Hayashi Hidezumi, Kawamura's chief of political affairs. Kawamura told Kim that he was one of the "notables" invited by Emperor Bảo Đại to consult in Huế on the creation of the new independent government. During this time, Kim also met with Diệm for the first time, finding out that he had not been included on the Japanese shortlist.

According to his own account, Kim accepted the invitation to talk with Bảo Đại because Hoàng Xuân Hãn, a young friend, was also on the emperor's list. Kim departed Saigon on April 2 and arrived in Huế three days later.

== Rule ==
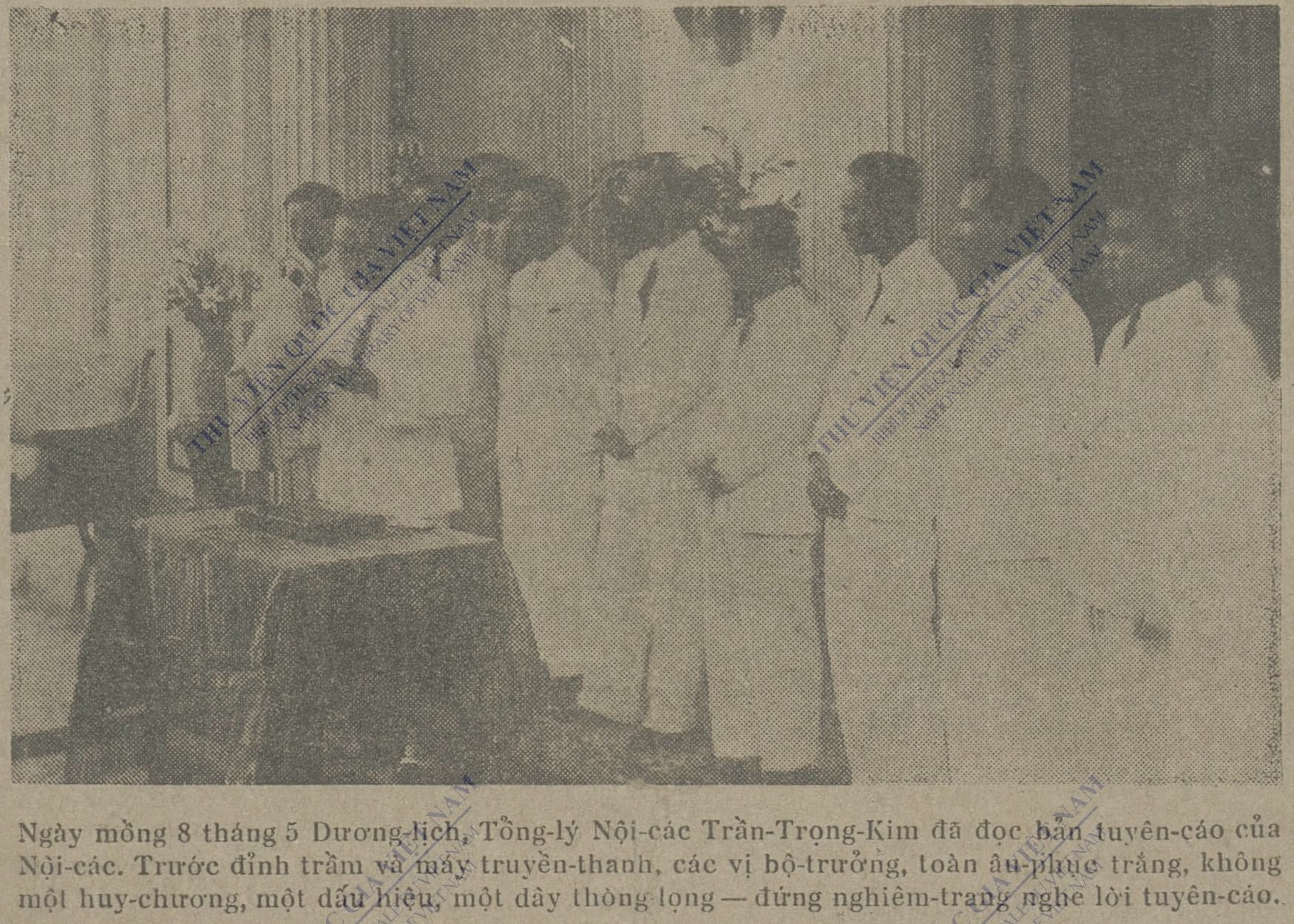
Proclamation of the Trần Trọng Kim cabinet.

On April 7, Bảo Đại held a personal meeting with Kim, and at first, Kim refused to accept the prime ministerial post. Kim said that he was too old, an independent with no political party infrastructure and without prior involvement in politics. However, Kim prolonged his stay for further negotiations and finally agreed to form a new government on April 16. The next day, Kim submitted his proposed cabinet consisting of ten ministers. With the exception of one nominee who refused his cabinet post, the others arrived in the capital by late April or early May to take office.

Most of his cabinet members had been trained in French schools but were regarded as nationalists although they were not regarded as anti-French. The cabinet (vi) included Phan Anh as minister of youth. Kim's regime was quickly endorsed by the Đại Việt Quốc dân đảng and the Việt Nam Quang Phục Hội, two nationalist political parties.

The Phục quốc were connected to Phan Bội Châu and Cường Để, two leading anti-colonial activists from the early 20th century who championed co-operation with Japan and pan-Asianism to expel French colonialism.

Kim government's management was inefficient due to the short timeframe, the Japanese wartime control, and the Allied bombings. The Viet Minh later overthrew the monarchy and seized power on 25 August 1945, when Japan surrendered to the Allies and the power vacuum was created. According to his memoirs, Kim recounted that he refused Japan's offer of assistance because the Allies would soon enter Vietnam to disarm the Japanese anyway (the Allies rejected any pro-Japanese government) and he also did not want foreign troops to oppress his compatriots. After his government collapsed, Kim returned to his research and academic work.

Kim's actions have caused a debate as to whether he was a Japanese puppet. Milton Sacks and John T. McAlister regard him as such, but others, such as Trương Bửu Lâm, regard Kim and his cabinet as a group of apolitical technocrats.
