= Hiến Town =

Coordinates: 20.640897915313623°N 106.05691751466271°E

- Phố Hiến (Vietnamese)
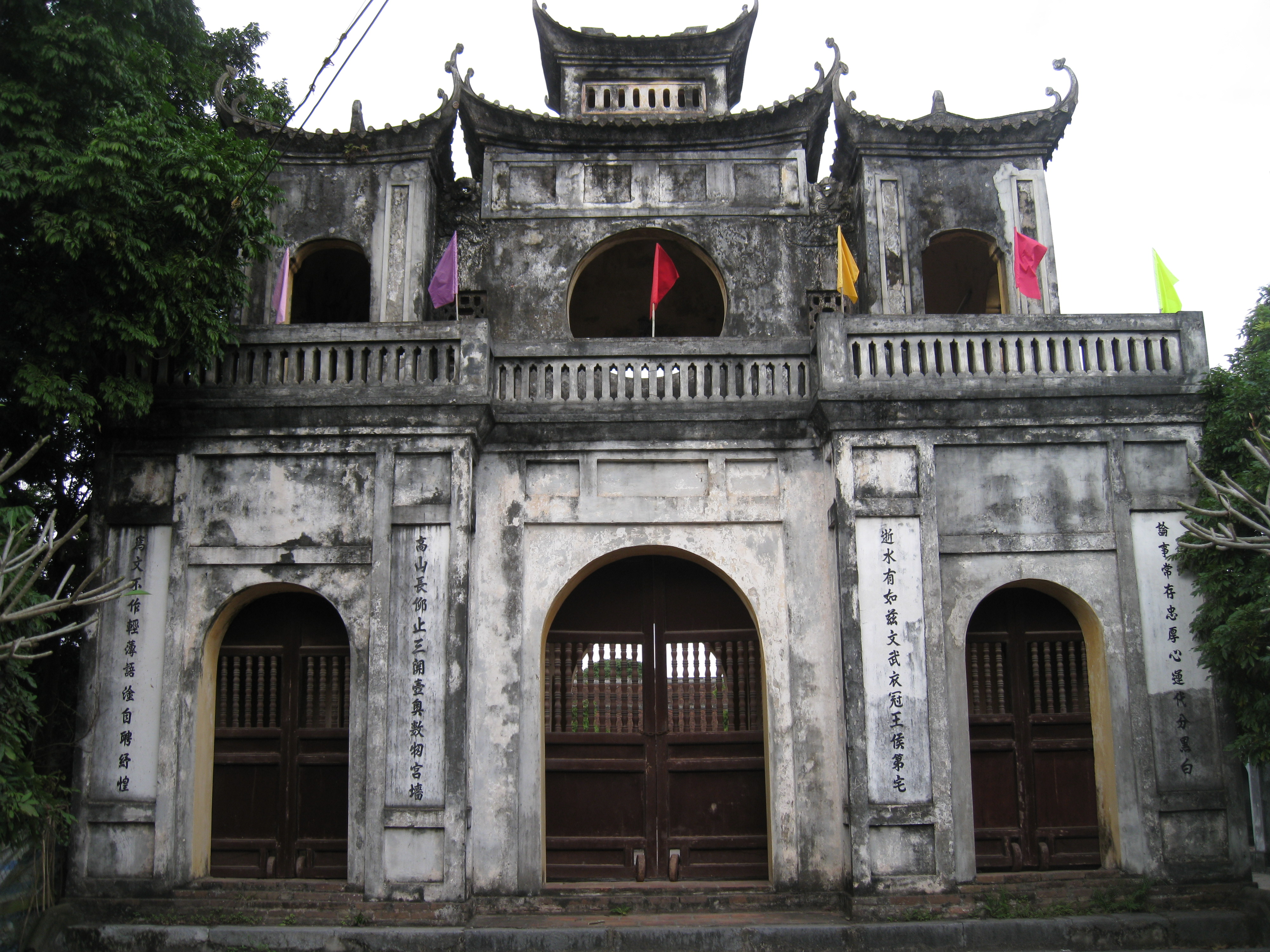
- Xích Đằng Temple of Literature
- Interactive map of Hiến Town
- Location: Hưng Yên province

History
- Founded: 13th century

Hiến Town or Hiến Street (Vietnamese: Phố Hiến) is a former trading post, old town and heritage site located in the province of Hưng Yên, which served as one of Vietnam's major international trading posts and settlements from the 16th until the 17th century. Located on what once was the riverbank of the Red River (which has since moved inland), the former trading post contains a variety of old buildings and historical artefacts, including a series of ancient temples and rivers; all of which are contained within the old trading posts' 20 individual wards. The town is currently listed as one of Vietnam's Special National Sites, starting from December 31, 2014. Nowadays, it is known as the central ward of Hưng Yên province, established from the central wards of the former city of Hưng Yên from July 2025.

== History ==
As of date, no documents that would have been able to definitively prove the trading posts' establishment and founding have been able to survive up until the present day. However, based on other pieces of historical evidence, historians were able to conclude that the trading post was located on what once was the Đằng Châu region, belonging to the Early Lê dynasty of Vietnam. From the 13th century onwards, the region received a number of Vietnamese-Chinese refugees, who eventually managed to establish a town named Hoa Dương; along with an influx of domestic migrants from other parts of the country.

At the end of the 15th century, administrative reforms ordered by the emperor, Lê Thánh Tông, resulted in the trading post gaining its current name. However, it was not until the 17th century that the trading post started to receive a number of Chinese, Japanese, and notably European immigrants and merchants, which caused a series of immigration and border checks to be set up in order to accommodate the rise in trade and immigration that the trading post was experiencing. The amount of trade and immigration triggered extreme economic growth which was experienced within the trading post, turning it into one of the busiest international ports within the country. Furthermore, due to the influx of immigration, the trading post was also once home to the representative offices of the British East India Company and the Dutch East India Company.

During the next two centuries, however, the trading post started to decline, which happened in several gradual steps over time. First was the opening up of the imperial Chinese and Japanese ports, which caused the trading post to lose its purpose as a midway stop in trade. In the 19th century, the Vietnamese capital, under the Nguyễn dynasty, then moved to the city of Huế further south; which caused an influx of Chinese immigrants who moved away from the trading post back to the city of Hanoi, which drained the trading post of its population. Due to both of those factors; in 1832, the province of Hưng Yên was established (by order of emperor Minh Mạng). The capital city of this new province was built on the site of the former trading post, where it still currently stands to this day. The newer provincial capital, unlike its predecessor, now serves only as an administrative (rather than economic) centre for the surrounding province.

== Architecture ==
All of the buildings and structures that were present within the old trading post received a number of foreign architectural influences, thanks to the amount of foreign immigrants and merchants that were settled here during the 16th to 17th century.

First were the Chinese, who built and left a series of buildings and structures most notably including temples and assembly halls. Those structures were deeply influenced by Chinese architectural styles, with the designs and decorative patterns present being especially considered. In certain temples and structures within the trading post, the traditional Chinese decorative patterns that were present on the structures were specially made in imperial China, which were then shipped over in order to be added and applied on.

Furthermore, the architectural style of some of the buildings and structures present within the trading post had received significant influences from certain European architectural styles, in particular the Gothic architectural style from the 17th century. This architectural influence can be found in a number of churches and cathedrals within the trading post, most notably including the Gothic Cathedral of Phố Hiến or Hưng Yên (Nhà thờ Giáo xứ Hưng yên or Phố Hiến), along with the trading posts' local Christian church.

== Preservation ==
The entire trading post is owned by the provincial government of Hưng Yên, who has taken some partial steps in order to more effectively preserve the town. This included plans to establish a potential 7-hectare "cultural park" in 2007, along with the preservation of notable historical buildings and structures and the organization of traditional events within the trading post.

Due to its historical and cultural importance, the old town was classified as one of Vietnam's Special National Sites on December 31, 2014.
