= Hoa tiên =

Vietnamese-language poem

Story of the flower-letter (Vietnamese: Hoa tiên truyện, chữ Hán: 花箋傳) is a famous vernacular Vietnamese poem written in chữ Nôm. It was written by Nguyễn Huy Tự (1743-1790) and revised by Nguyễn Thiện (1763-1818). The poem was originally inspired by the late 17th century Chinese poem, Faazin Gei (Chinese: 花箋記; pinyin: Huājiān Jì; Jyutping: Faa^{1}zin^{1} Gei^{3}; Vietnamese: Hoa tiên ký, chữ Hán: 花箋記), but then made its way to Japan and Vietnam.

First 8 lines of Hoa tiên
Vietnamese Chữ Nôm (chữ Nôm, 𡨸喃)	Vietnamese Alphabet (chữ Quốc Ngữ)
𤾓𢆥𠬠𥿥䊼紅	Trăm năm một sợi chỉ hồng,
纀𠊛才色𠓨𥪝椌𡗶	Buộc người tài sắc vào trong khung trời.
事𠁀此吟𦓡𨔈	Sự đời thử ngẫm mà chơi,
情縁𠄩𡨸貝𠊛咍𫳵	Tình duyên hai chữ với người hay sao?
曾𦖑𦝄𫗄縁𱜢	Từng nghe trăng gió duyên nào,
𣷭溇𱺵義𡽫髙𱺵情	Bể sâu là nghĩa, non cao là tình.
𠊛𢫝行堛才名	Người dung hạnh, bậc tài danh,
𠦳秋底𠬠䋦情𫜵𦎛	Nghìn thu để một mối tình làm gương.
