= Zhang Bi =

Zhang Bi (simplified Chinese: 张泌; traditional Chinese: 張泌; pinyin: Zhāng Bì; born 930, date of death unknown), was a Chinese Ci lyric poet who lived during the Later Shu. He was one of the chief poets of the group influenced by Wen Tingyun which became known as the "Huajian Faction". Translators of his verse include Herbert Giles and Qiu Xiaolong.
