= Tiên Điền =

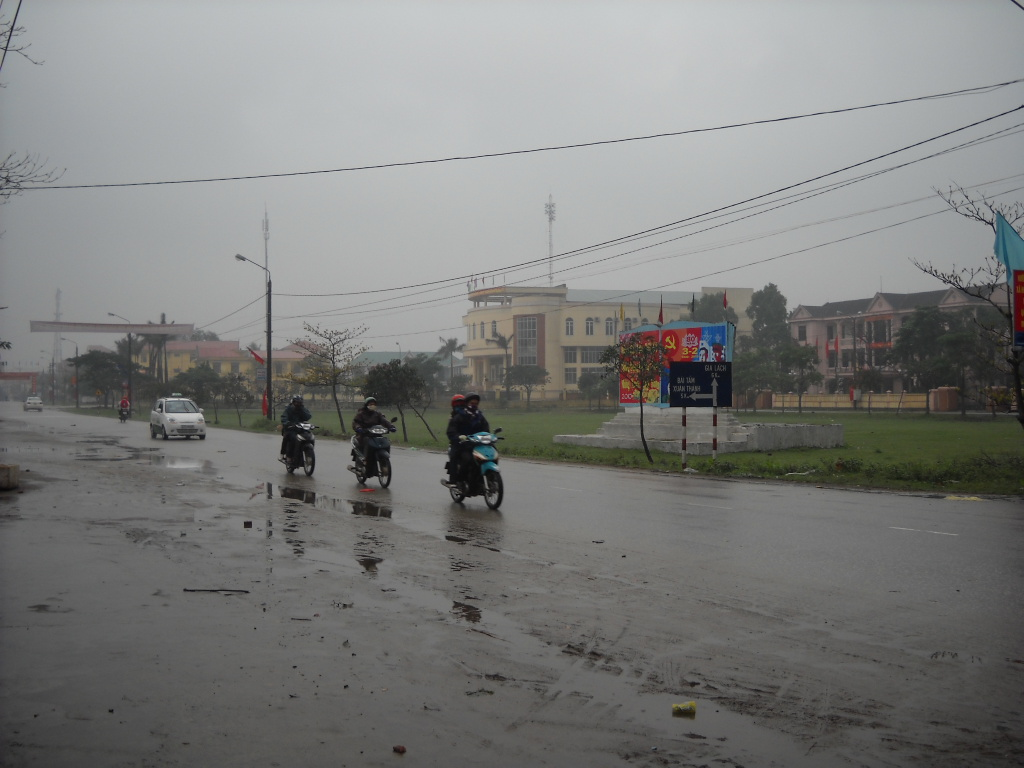
- A road in Tiên Điền commune
- Interactive map of Tiên Điền
- Coordinates: 18°39′57″N 105°45′26″E
- Country: Vietnam
- Region: North Central Coast
- Province: Hà Tĩnh
- Established: 16 June 2025

Area
  - Total: 31.60 km^{2} (12.20 sq mi)

Population (2025)
  - Total: 24,833
  - Density: 785/km^{2} (2,030/sq mi)

Tiên Điền is a commune in Hà Tĩnh province, Vietnam.

On 16 June 2025, the Standing Committee of the National Assembly of Vietnam issued Resolution No. 1665/NQ-UBTVQH15. Under the resolution, the entire area and population of Tiên Điền township, Xuân Yên commune, Xuân Mỹ commune, and Xuân Thành commune were merged to form a new commune named Tiên Điền.
