= Đức Quang =

Đức Quang Xã Đức Quang
- Rural commune
- Đức Quang commune
- Location within Vietnam
- Coordinates: 18°32′07″N 105°37′15″E
- Country: Vietnam
- Region: North Central Coast
- Province: Hà Tĩnh
- Time zone: UTC+7 (UTC + 7)

Đức Quang is a rural commune (xã) of Hà Tĩnh Province, Vietnam.

On November 21, 2019, the Standing Committee of the National Assembly issued Resolution No. 819/NQ-UBTVQH14 on the reorganization of commune-level administrative units in Hà Tĩnh Province (the resolution took effect on January 1, 2020). Accordingly, the entire area and population of the three communes of Bùi Xá, Đức La, and Đức Nhân were merged to form Bùi La Nhân Commune.

On June 16, 2025, the Standing Committee of the National Assembly issued Resolution No. 1665/NQ-UBTVQH15. Accordingly, the entire natural area and population of the communes of Quang Vĩnh, Bùi La Nhân, and Yên Hồ were reorganized into a new commune named Đức Quang.
