= Nguyễn Huy Tự =

Nguyễn Huy Tự (阮輝嗣, 1743 – July 27, 1790), pen name Uẩn Trai, was an intellect and a Lê dynasty official.

== Background ==
Nguyễn Huy Tự was born in a famous academic family in Trường Lưu village, Lai Thach commune, Lai Thạch town, La Sơn district, Đức Quang district, Nghệ Antown (Truong Loc commune, Can Loc district, Hà Tĩnh province).

- He was the son of ‘‘Thám hoa’’ Nguyễn Huy and son-in-law of Dr. ‘‘Nguyễn Khản’’ (Nguyễn Du brother) in Tien Dien Commune, Nghi Xuan District, Ha Tinh Province.
- At the age of 17, Nguyen Huy Tu passed the fifth Thi Hương at Nghệ An School. In the beginning, he was promoted to the office of lectures in the ‘‘Lượng Vương’’ palace (Trịnh Sâm). Shortly thereafter, he was promoted to ‘‘Binh phiên câu kê’’ int Trinh Doanh Palace.
- In 1767, he was promoted as ‘‘Hồng lô tự thừa’’.
- In 1768, he was appointed to be ‘‘Tri Phủ’’ of Quoc Oai.
- In 1790, he was invited by King Quang Trung to Phu Xuan. He was a ‘‘Hữu Thị Lang’’ for the Tây Sơn. But immediately after that, he was seriously ill and died on July 27, 1790, in Phu Xuan, aged 47.
