= Hưng Yên (city) =

Hưng Yên City Thành phố Hưng Yên
- City (Class-3)
- Seal
- Nickname: "Hiến Palace" (Dinh Hiến)
- Interactive map of Hưng Yên City
- Location within Vietnam
- Country: Vietnam
- Region: Red River Delta
- Province: Hưng Yên
- Establishment: 2009
- Central agency: 568 Triệu Quang Phục road, Lê Lợi ward

Government
  - People Committee's Chairman: Nguyễn Khả Phúc
  - People Council's Chairman: Lương Công Chanh
  - Front Committee's Chairman: Đào Đức Hùng
  - Party Committee's Secretary: Phạm Huy Bình

Area
  - City (Class-3): 73.89 km^{2} (28.53 sq mi)

Population (2021)
  - City (Class-3): 118,646
  - Density: 1,606/km^{2} (4,160/sq mi)
  - Urban: 53,638
  - Metro: 65,008
  - Ethnicities: Kinh
- Time zone: UTC+7 (Indochina Time)
- ZIP code: 17000
- Climate: Cwa
- Website: thanhphohungyen.gov.vn

Hưng Yên is a former city located in the Red River Delta of the Northern Vietnam. It was the capital of Hưng Yên Province and is a third-graded city according to Vietnam's urban classification table.

Hưng Yên ceased to exist as a municipal city on 1 July 2025, following the elimination of district level units in Vietnam.

== History ==
Hưng Yên city was originally the expansion of Phố Hiến (Hiến Street), a river port that appeared earliest in the 16th century.

Phố Hiến has a position as a place where Sơn Nam garrison's government was located. However, its area was relatively small. It only consists of a public authority, Xích Đằng Literary Temple and a few markets. During several centuries, this location was an important gateway of the commercial platform in Đông Kinh.

It was not until the French set a protective regime that Phố Hiến was expanded to Hưng Yên town (thị xã Hưng Yên).

== Geography ==
=== Topography ===
According to the 2021 statistical yearbook of the whole Hưng Yên province, Hưng Yên city covers an area of 73.89 km^{2}.

Hưng Yên is a delta municipality. The entire area of Hưng Yên city is almost flat, which tends to be sunken from the Northeast to the Southwest. It is located in the farthest position to the South of Hưng Yên province, where adjacent to the Red River, about 60 km away from Hanoi. Besides, Hưng Yên owns two sediment isles near the territory of Hanoi, where includes communes Phú Cường and Hùng Cường.

Hưng Yên borders Kim Động district to the North and Tiên Lữ district to the East. The Red River is the natural boundary between Hưng Yên and Hà Nam province's Lý Nhân district and Duy Tiên district. National Route 38 and Yên Lệnh bridge connect the city to National Route 1st across the Red River.

=== Demography ===
As of 2021 Hưng Yên city had a population of 118,646. In particular, all people are registered as Kinh.

== Administrative divisions ==
Hưng Yên city was divided into 6 wards: An Tảo, Hiến Nam, Hồng Châu, Lam Sơn, Lê Lợi, Minh Khai and 9 communes: Bảo Khê, Hoàng Hanh, Hùng Cường, Liên Phương, Phú Cường, Phương Nam, Quảng Châu, Tân Hưng, Trung Nghĩa.

== Culture ==
In terms of beliefs and history, the area of Phố Hiến is considered one of the "cradles" of the Catholic Church in Vietnam.

According to the historical document of the Roman Catholic Church and some records of Annamese officials, Bishop Pierre Lambert de la Motte had summoned the first Đàng-ngoày Council (Công-đồng Đàng-ngoày) here in 1670, and that event was considered as the beginning of the Christian history in the whole Hưng Yên province. Therefore, since December 23, 1673, Hưng Yên city has been considered a traditional address to have the regular meetings of Dinh-Hiến Council (Công-đồng Dinh-Hiến), under order Apostolatus Officium by Pope Clement X.

Currently, the territory of Hưng Yên city is part to Đông Hưng Yên Deanery, belonged to Thái Bình Cathedral Diocese.

=== Tourism ===
The city is well-known in the world (especially among historians) for Phố Hiến (an ancient port-city located in the area). There are still a lot of ancient Asian church, temples, pagodas and other religious buildings here.

Nhãn lồng (fruit of dragon eye) is one of Hưng Yên's specialties.

=== Climate ===
Climate data for Hưng Yên
| Month | Jan | Feb | Mar | Apr | May | Jun | Jul | Aug | Sep | Oct | Nov | Dec | Year |
|---|---|---|---|---|---|---|---|---|---|---|---|---|---|
| Record high °C (°F) | 32.0 (89.6) | 33.6 (92.5) | 37.6 (99.7) | 41.2 (106.2) | 39.4 (102.9) | 40.5 (104.9) | 40.5 (104.9) | 38.7 (101.7) | 36.6 (97.9) | 36.4 (97.5) | 34.5 (94.1) | 31.8 (89.2) | 41.2 (106.2) |
| Mean daily maximum °C (°F) | 19.5 (67.1) | 20.1 (68.2) | 22.6 (72.7) | 27.0 (80.6) | 31.1 (88.0) | 32.8 (91.0) | 32.8 (91.0) | 31.9 (89.4) | 30.8 (87.4) | 28.7 (83.7) | 25.4 (77.7) | 21.7 (71.1) | 27.0 (80.6) |
| Daily mean °C (°F) | 16.2 (61.2) | 17.3 (63.1) | 19.9 (67.8) | 23.7 (74.7) | 27.1 (80.8) | 28.9 (84.0) | 29.1 (84.4) | 28.4 (83.1) | 27.2 (81.0) | 24.8 (76.6) | 21.4 (70.5) | 17.9 (64.2) | 23.5 (74.3) |
| Mean daily minimum °C (°F) | 14.0 (57.2) | 15.4 (59.7) | 18.0 (64.4) | 21.6 (70.9) | 24.4 (75.9) | 26.1 (79.0) | 26.5 (79.7) | 25.9 (78.6) | 24.8 (76.6) | 22.2 (72.0) | 18.7 (65.7) | 15.2 (59.4) | 21.1 (70.0) |
| Record low °C (°F) | 4.9 (40.8) | 5.3 (41.5) | 6.6 (43.9) | 12.2 (54.0) | 16.5 (61.7) | 19.4 (66.9) | 20.6 (69.1) | 21.8 (71.2) | 16.5 (61.7) | 12.5 (54.5) | 8.4 (47.1) | 4.8 (40.6) | 4.8 (40.6) |
| Average rainfall mm (inches) | 27.1 (1.07) | 25.1 (0.99) | 46.8 (1.84) | 86.4 (3.40) | 174.1 (6.85) | 206.2 (8.12) | 220.2 (8.67) | 277.1 (10.91) | 252.5 (9.94) | 169.2 (6.66) | 71.7 (2.82) | 23.6 (0.93) | 1,580.7 (62.23) |
| Average rainy days | 9.1 | 12.4 | 16.6 | 13.2 | 13.1 | 13.8 | 13.8 | 15.7 | 13.6 | 10.7 | 7.2 | 5.6 | 145.0 |
| Average relative humidity (%) | 84.3 | 87.1 | 89.2 | 89.1 | 85.6 | 83.1 | 83.8 | 86.7 | 86.2 | 83.7 | 82.2 | 81.5 | 85.2 |
| Mean monthly sunshine hours | 69.1 | 41.4 | 44.4 | 88.9 | 178.3 | 174.0 | 192.4 | 168.0 | 166.1 | 155.5 | 131.4 | 112.2 | 1,521.8 |
Source: Vietnam Institute for Building Science and Technology

== See also ==
- Bắc Ninh
- Hải Dương
- Phủ Lý
- Thái Bình
