= Nghi Xuân =

- Interactive map of Nghi Xuân
- Coordinates: 18.640023269855586°N 105.72973608462013°E
- Country: Vietnam
- Region: North Central Coast
- Province: Hà Tĩnh
- Established: 16 June 2025

Area
  - Total: 77.65 km^{2} (29.98 sq mi)

Population (2025)
  - Total: 37,524
  - Density: 483/km^{2} (1,250/sq mi)

Nghi Xuân is a commune in Hà Tĩnh province, Vietnam.

The area of present-day Nghi Xuân commune was formerly part of Nghi Xuân district, Hà Tĩnh province.

On 16 June 2025, the Standing Committee of the National Assembly of Vietnam issued Resolution No. 1665/NQ-UBTVQH15 on the arrangement of commune-level administrative units in Hà Tĩnh province in 2025. Under the resolution, the entire area and population of Xuân An township, Xuân Giang commune, Xuân Hồng commune, Xuân Viên commune, and Xuân Lĩnh commune were merged to form a new commune named Nghi Xuân.
