= Huajian Faction =

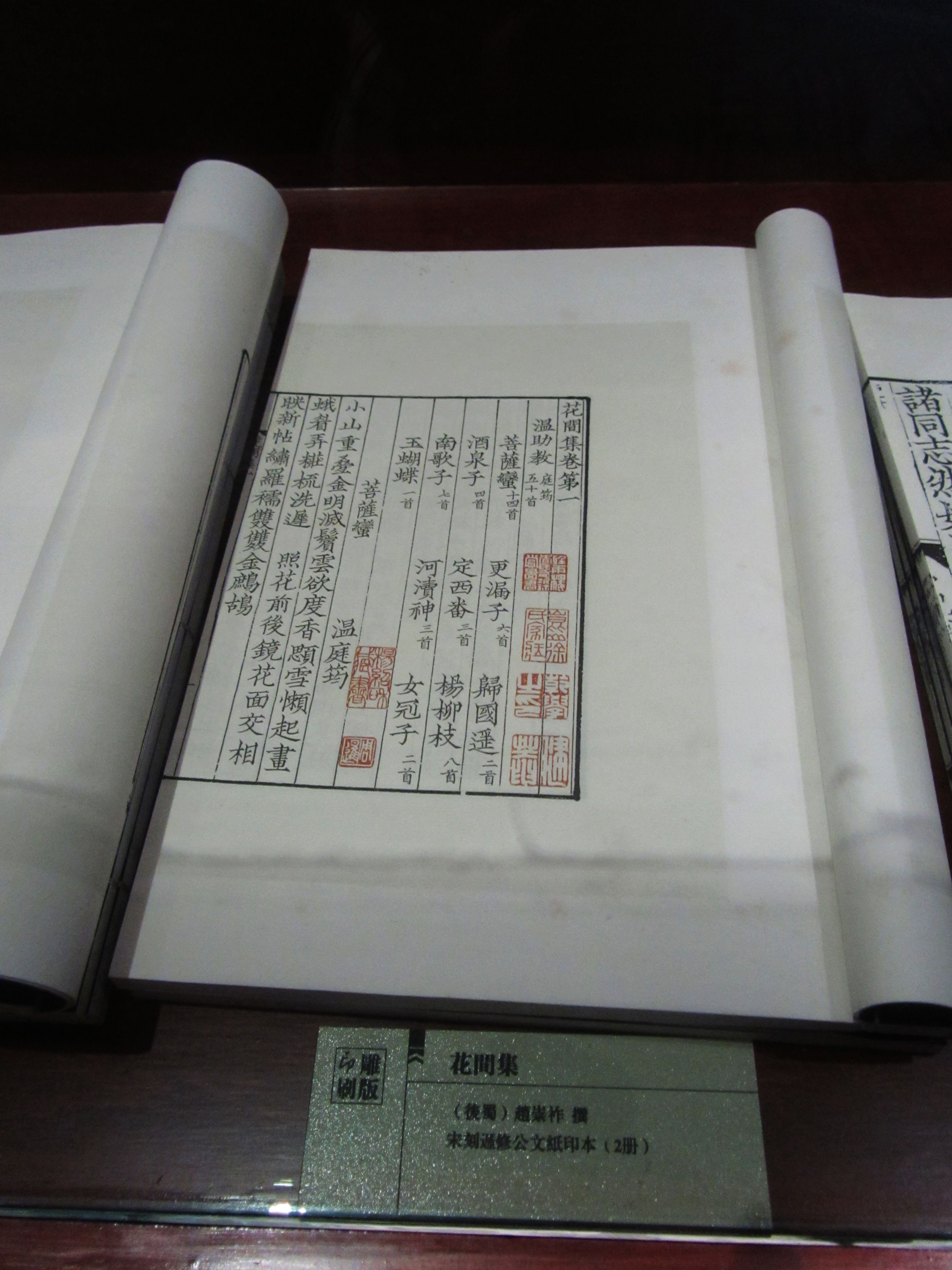
Huajian ji(anthology). Collected by the Museum of Engraving and Printing.

The Huajian Faction (simplified Chinese: 花间派; traditional Chinese: 花間派; pinyin: Huājiān Pài; lit. 'In the Flowers Faction') is a faction of Ci poetry. It comprises Ci poets whose works were collected in the anthology Huajian Ji, including, Wen Tingyun, Wei Zhuang and Zhang Mi.

It is widely agreed that the faction was formed by Wen Tingyun during the Tang dynasty, and become popular during the Later Shu of the Five Dynasties and Ten Kingdoms period.

== Features ==
Most of the works of the faction have topics about love between young people, the sadness of farewell and boudoir complaints (in ancient China, unmarried young women were locked in a room), with no more than 58 characters and no titles. The style is mainly gentle, graceful and subtle, but there are also simple ones.

The faction had already laid the foundation for later Ci during the Song dynasty, however, the artistic achievements of the faction were for a long time considered by academia to be less than Song Ci. The faction influenced the writing style of Feng Yansi and Li Yu

== Huajian Ji ==
Huajian Ji (Chinese 花间集/花間集) was arranged by Zhao Chongzuo, who lived in the Later Shu. This anthology, which was finished in 940 A.D., contains over 500 works by ten poets. It was part of the Complete Library of the Four Treasuries, in the Collections (Chinese: 集, Jí) section. This ji contains 74 kinds of cipai (Chinese 词牌cípái, a particular title of ci). Huanxisha (浣溪沙), Pusaman (菩萨蛮), Linjiangxian (临江仙) and Jiuquanzi (酒泉子) are often used as cipai in this ji.

Huajian Ji had a great influence upon later ci. Lu You consider it to be "the most simple and quaint works" (简古之致).
