= Chu Mạnh Trinh =

Vietnamese poet

Chu Mạnh Trinh (chữ Hán: 朱孟楨, 1862–1905), courtesy name as Cán Thần, and his art name as Trúc Vân, was an intellectual in the Nguyễn dynasty. He was the author of the poem Hàm Tử quan hoài cổ and Hương Sơn Phong Cảnh Ca.
