= Special National Sites (Vietnam) =

Special National Site is the status given to sites of exceptional natural, historical, cultural and archaeological interest in Vietnam. They are national sites proposed by the Ministry of Culture, Sports and Tourism and approved by the Prime Minister. Currently there are 48 Special National Sites, eight of which are UNESCO World Heritage Sites.

== Classification ==
The Special National Sites of Vietnam include:

- Four sites of scenic beauty: Hạ Long Bay, Ba Bể Lake, Cát Tiên National Park and the Tràng An-Tam Cốc-Bích Động Complex.
- Cultural heritages: Bút Tháp Temple, Dâu Pagoda, Citadel of the Hồ Dynasty, Hội An

In 2025, were added to the list: Po Nagar, Bối Khê Pagoda, Xẩm Temple in Nam Định province, relic complex of the Mạc dynasty and relic complex of Từ Lương Xâm in Haiphong.
