= Nghi Xuân district =

Coordinates: 18.667°N 106.833°E

Nghi Xuân District Huyện Nghi Xuân
- District
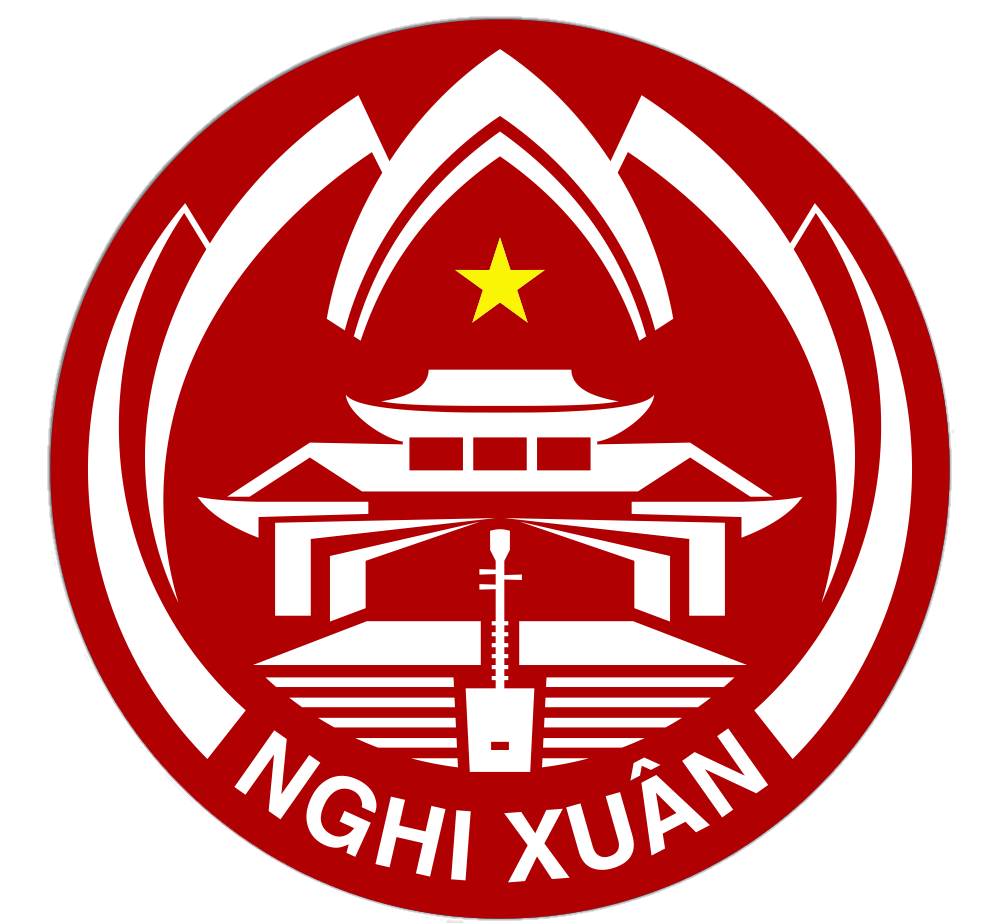
- Seal
- Interactive map of Nghi Xuân District
- Country: Vietnam
- Region: North Central Coast
- Province: Hà Tĩnh
- Capital: Nghi Xuân town

Area
  - Total: 85 sq mi (220 km^{2})

Population (2003)
  - Total: 99,288
- Time zone: UTC+7 (Indochina Time)

Nghi Xuân is a former rural district of Hà Tĩnh province in the North Central Coast region of Vietnam. As of 2003 the district had a population of 99,288. The district covers an area of 220 km^{2}. The district seat is the town of Nghi Xuân. Nguyễn Du and Nguyễn Công Trứ, both accomplished writers, were born here.
