= Vietnamese literature =

Vietnamese literature (Vietnamese: Văn học Việt Nam) is the literature, both oral and written, created largely by the Vietnamese. Early Vietnamese literature has been greatly influenced by Chinese literature. As Literary Chinese was the formal written language for government documents, a majority of literary works were composed in Hán văn or as văn ngôn. From the 10th century, a minority of literary works were composed in chữ Nôm, the former writing system for the Vietnamese language. The Nôm script better represented Vietnamese literature as it led to the creation of different poetic forms like Lục bát and Song thất lục bát. It also allowed for Vietnamese reduplication to be used in Vietnamese poetry.

== History ==
For a millennium before the tenth century, Vietnam was under the rule of various Chinese dynasties and as a result much of the written work during this period was in chữ Hán (Chinese characters), works written in chữ Hán were either called Hán văn or văn ngôn. Chữ Nôm, created around the tenth century, allowed writers to compose in Vietnamese using native characters that were coined by using Chinese radicals. It flourished in the 18th century when many notable Vietnamese writers and poets composed their works in chữ Nôm and when it briefly became the official written script during the Hồ dynasty and the Tây Sơn dynasty.

While the Vietnamese alphabet was created in 1631 by Francisco de Pina, it did not become popular outside of missionary groups until the early 20th century, when the French colonial administration mandated its use in French Indochina. By the mid-20th century, virtually all Vietnamese works of literature were composed in Vietnamese alphabet. Today, Francophone Vietnamese and English-speaking Vietnamese are counted by many critics as contributors to the ongoing history of Vietnamese literature.

== Types ==
=== Folk literature ===
Unlike written literature, early oral literature was composed in Vietnamese and is still accessible to ordinary Vietnamese today. Vietnamese folk literature is an intermingling of many forms. It is not only an oral tradition, but a mixing of three media: hidden (only retained in the memory of folk authors), fixed (written), and shown (performed). Folk literature usually exist in many versions, passed down orally, and have unknown authors.

Myths consist of stories about supernatural beings, heroes, creator gods, and reflect the viewpoint of ancient people about human life. They consist of creation stories, stories about their origins (Con rồng cháu tiên), culture heroes (Sơn Tinh or Mountain Spirit - Thủy Tinh or Water Spirit).

=== Medieval literature ===
==== Hán văn ====
The earliest surviving literature by Vietnamese writers is written in chữ Hán (Chinese characters). Almost all of the official documents in Vietnamese history were written in chữ Hán, as were the first poems. Not only is the Chinese script foreign to modern Vietnamese speakers, these works are mostly unintelligible even when directly transliterated from Classical Chinese into the modern Vietnamese alphabet due to their Chinese grammar and vocabulary. As a result, these works must be translated into Vietnamese in order to be understood by the general public. These works include official proclamations by Vietnamese emperors, imperial histories, and declarations of independence from China, as well as Vietnamese poetry. In chronological order notable works include:

- Thiên đô chiếu ( 遷都詔) 1010, Edict on transfer the capital of Đại Cồ Việt from Hoa Lư (modern Ninh Bình) to Đại La (modern Hanoi).
- Nam quốc sơn hà ( 南國山河) 1077, Mountains and rivers of the Southern country, poem by Lý Thường Kiệt
- Đại Việt sử ký ( 大越史記), Annals of Đại Việt by Lê Văn Hưu, 1272
- Dụ chư tì tướng hịch văn ( 諭諸裨將檄文), Proclamation to the Officers, General Trần Hưng Đạo, 1284
- An Nam chí lược ( 安南志略), Abbreviated Records of Annam, anon. 1335
- Gia huấn ca ( 家訓歌), The Family Training Ode, a 976-line Confucian morality poem attributed to Nguyễn Trãi 1420s
- Lĩnh Nam chích quái ( 嶺南摭怪), "The wonderful tales of Lĩnh Nam" 14th Century, edited Vũ Quỳnh (1452-1516)
- Đại Việt sử lược ( 大越史略), Abbreviated History of Đại Việt, anon. 1377
- Việt điện u linh tập ( 越甸幽靈集), Spirits of the Departed in the Viet Realm, Lý Tế Xuyên 1400
- Bình Ngô đại cáo ( 平吳大誥), Great Proclamation upon the Pacification of the Wu Forces, Nguyễn Trãi 1428
- Đại Việt sử ký toàn thư ( 大越史記全書), Complete Annals of Đại Việt, Ngô Sĩ Liên 1479.
- Truyền kỳ mạn lục ( 傳奇漫錄, Collection of Strange Tales, partly by Nguyễn Dữ, 16th century
- Hoàng Lê nhất thống chí ( 皇黎一統志), Unification Records of the Le Emperor, historical novel ending with Gia Long. anon.
- Chinh phụ ngâm ( 征婦吟), "Lament of the soldier's wife", the original Chinese version by Đặng Trần Côn d.1745
- Đại Việt thông sử ( 大越通史), history by Lê Quý Đôn 1749
- Vân đài loại ngữ ( 芸臺類語), encyclopedia by Lê Quý Đôn 1773
- Phủ biên tạp lục ( 撫邊雜錄), Frontier Chronicles by Lê Quý Đôn 1776
- Việt Nam vong quốc sử ( 越南亡國史), by Phan Bội Châu in Japan in 1905

Some of these Literary Chinese texts are still taught in school. For example, the poem Nam quốc sơn hà ( 南國山河) by Lý Thường Kiệt, is in the textbook used by schools in Vietnam. The texts are generally and commonly is divided into three sections.

The following poems (in its original forms) are not understood by the ordinary Vietnamese person, as the text is in Literary Chinese which uses Classical Chinese syntax and vocabulary not used in modern Vietnamese. When transliterated, the Chinese characters are replaced with their Chữ quốc ngữ counterparts.

Nam quốc sơn hà ( 南國山河)
Classical Chinese	Vietnamese transliteration
南國山河南帝居	Nam quốc sơn hà nam đế cư
截然定分在天書	Tiệt nhiên định phận tại thiên thư
如何逆虜來侵犯	Như hà nghịch lỗ lai xâm phạm
汝等行看取敗虛	Nhữ đẳng hành khan thủ bại hư

The following section contains the simple translation of the above poem in modern Vietnamese.

The act of directly translating Hán văn is locally referred to as dịch nghĩa, and often involve the use of literal meanings of lines rather than full-fledged, translated poems.

Sông núi nước Nam
Vietnamese translation
Sông núi nước Nam, vua Nam ở
Giới phận đó đã được định rõ ràng ở sách trời
Cớ sao kẻ thù lại dám đến xâm phạm
Chúng mày nhất định sẽ nhìn thấy việc chuốc lấy bại vong

Dịch thơ (Translated poem) -

The subsequent section contains a more extensive translation of the poem in Vietnamese, the act of which is known as Dịch thơ (lit. 'poem translation'.

It differs from direct translations, as a poem is instead translated in a manner resembling poems, adhering to poetic meter whilst maintaining the use of modern-day vocabulary.

Sông núi nước Nam
Vietnamese translated poem
Sông núi nước Nam vua Nam ở
Vằng vặc sách trời chia xứ sở
Giặc dữ cớ sao phạm đến đây
Chúng mày nhất định phải tan vỡ

==== Nôm ====
Works written in chữ Nôm - a locally invented demotic script based on chữ Hán - was developed for writing the spoken Vietnamese language from the 13th Century onwards. For the most part, these chữ Nôm texts can be directly transliterated into the modern chữ Quốc ngữ and be readily understood by modern Vietnamese speakers. However, since chữ Nôm was never standardized, there are ambiguities as to which words are meant when a writer used certain characters. This resulted in many variations when transliterating works in chữ Nôm into Vietnamese alphabet. Some highly regarded works in Vietnamese literature were written in chữ Nôm, including Nguyễn Du's Truyện Kiều (傳翹), Đoàn Thị Điểm's chữ nôm translation of the poem Chinh Phụ Ngâm Khúc ( 征婦吟曲 - Song of the Soldier's Wife) from the Classical Chinese poem composed by her friend Đặng Trần Côn (famous in its own right), and poems by the renowned poet Hồ Xuân Hương.

Other notable works include:

- Chinh phụ ngâm ( 征婦吟), "Lament of the soldier's wife", translations from Chinese into vernacular chữ Nôm by several translators including Phan Huy Ích and Đoàn Thị Điểm
- Cung oán ngâm khúc ( 宮怨吟曲), "Song of the Sorrowful Concubine" by Nguyễn Gia Thiều, d.1798
- Hạnh Thục ca ( 行蜀歌), "Song of Exile to Thục" Nguyễn Thị Bích, 1885
- Lục súc tranh công ( 六畜爭功), "The Quarrel of the Six Beasts"
- Lục Vân Tiên ( 蓼雲仙傳), epic poem by the blind poet Nguyễn Đình Chiểu, d.1888
- Nhị độ mai ( 貳度梅), "The Plum Tree Blossoms Twice"
- Phạm Công – Cúc Hoa ( 范公菊花), Tale of Phạm Công and Cúc Hoa
- Phạm Tải – Ngọc Hoa ( 范子玉花), Tale of the orphan Phạm Tải and princess Ngọc Hoa
- Phan Trần ( 潘陳), The clan of Phan and the clan of Trần
- Quốc âm thi tập ( 國音詩集), "National pronunciation poetry collection" attributed to Nguyễn Trãi after retirement
- Thạch Sanh tân truyện ( 石生新傳), anon. 18th century
- Tống Trân and Cúc Hoa ( 宋珍菊花), Tale of Tống Trân and his wife Cúc Hoa
- Trinh thử ( 貞鼠), "The Virgin Mouse", Hò̂ Huyè̂n Qui, 15th century
- Hoa tiên ( 花箋), The Flowered Letter, based on the late 17th century Chinese poem, Faazin Gei.
- Tự Đức thánh chế tự học giải nghĩa ca (嗣德聖製字學解義歌) - a bilingual Literary Chinese - Vietnamese character dictionary.
- Tam thiên tự (三千字) - Used to teach beginners Chinese characters and chữ Nôm.
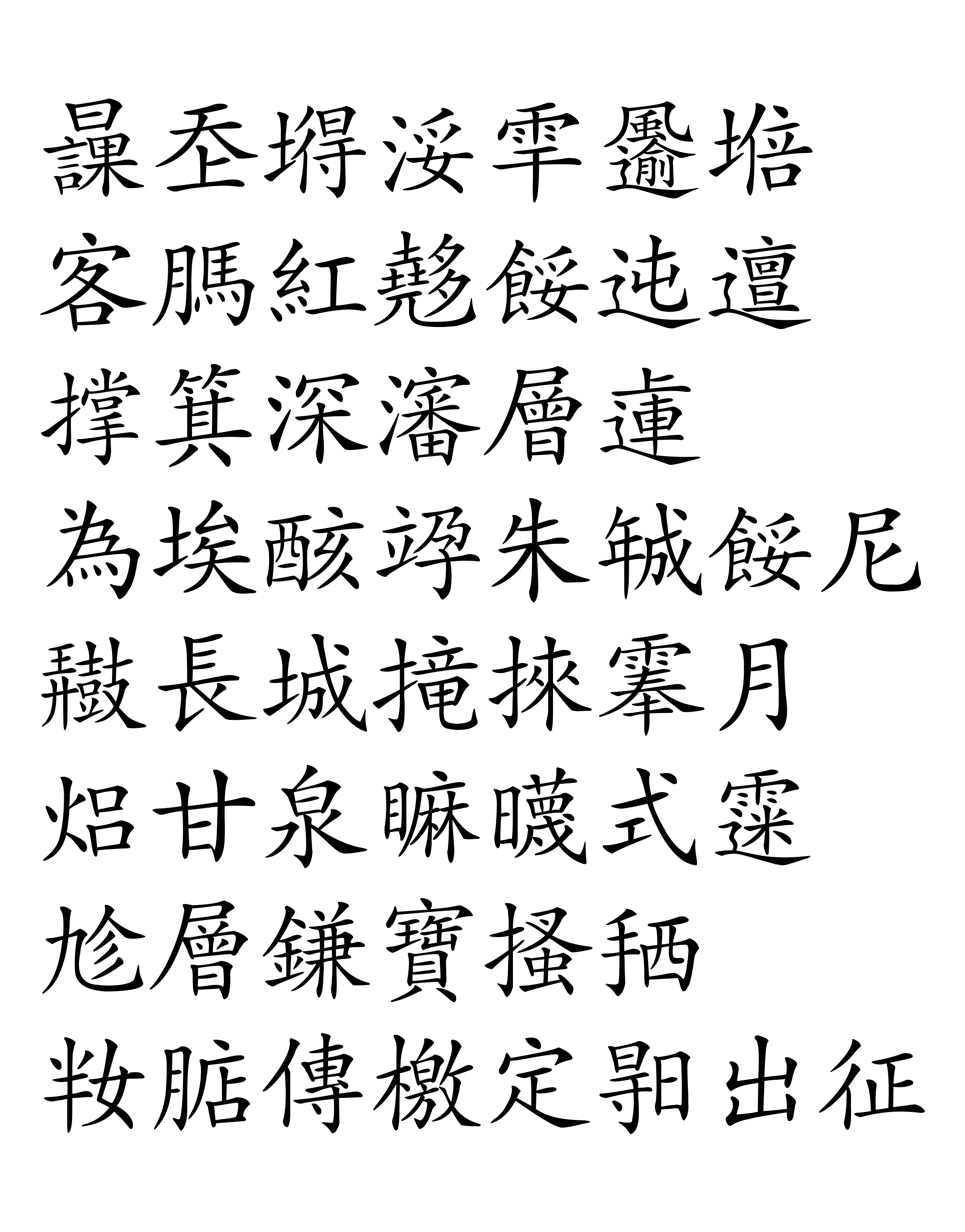
Chinh Phụ Ngâm Khúc

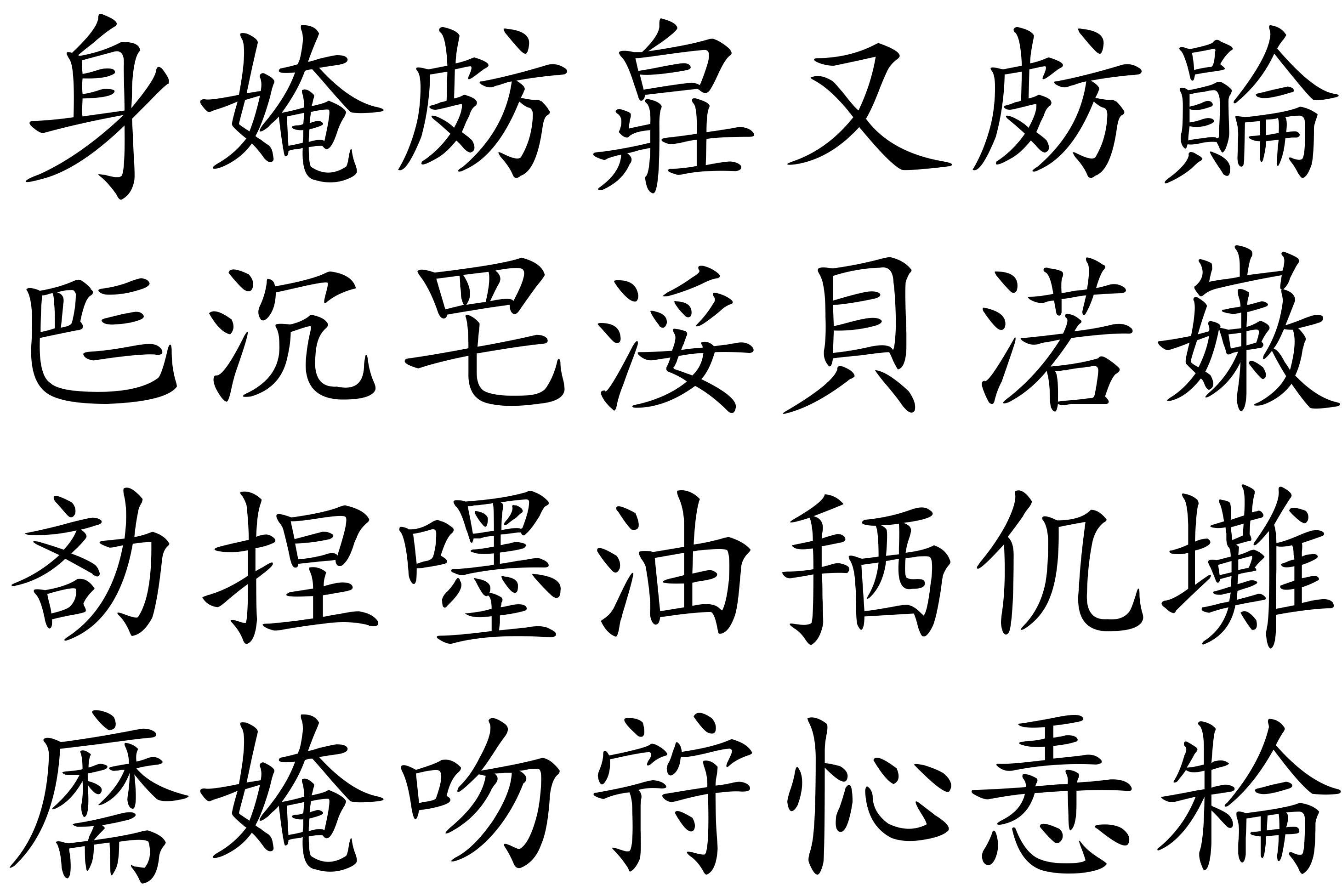
Bánh Trôi Nước

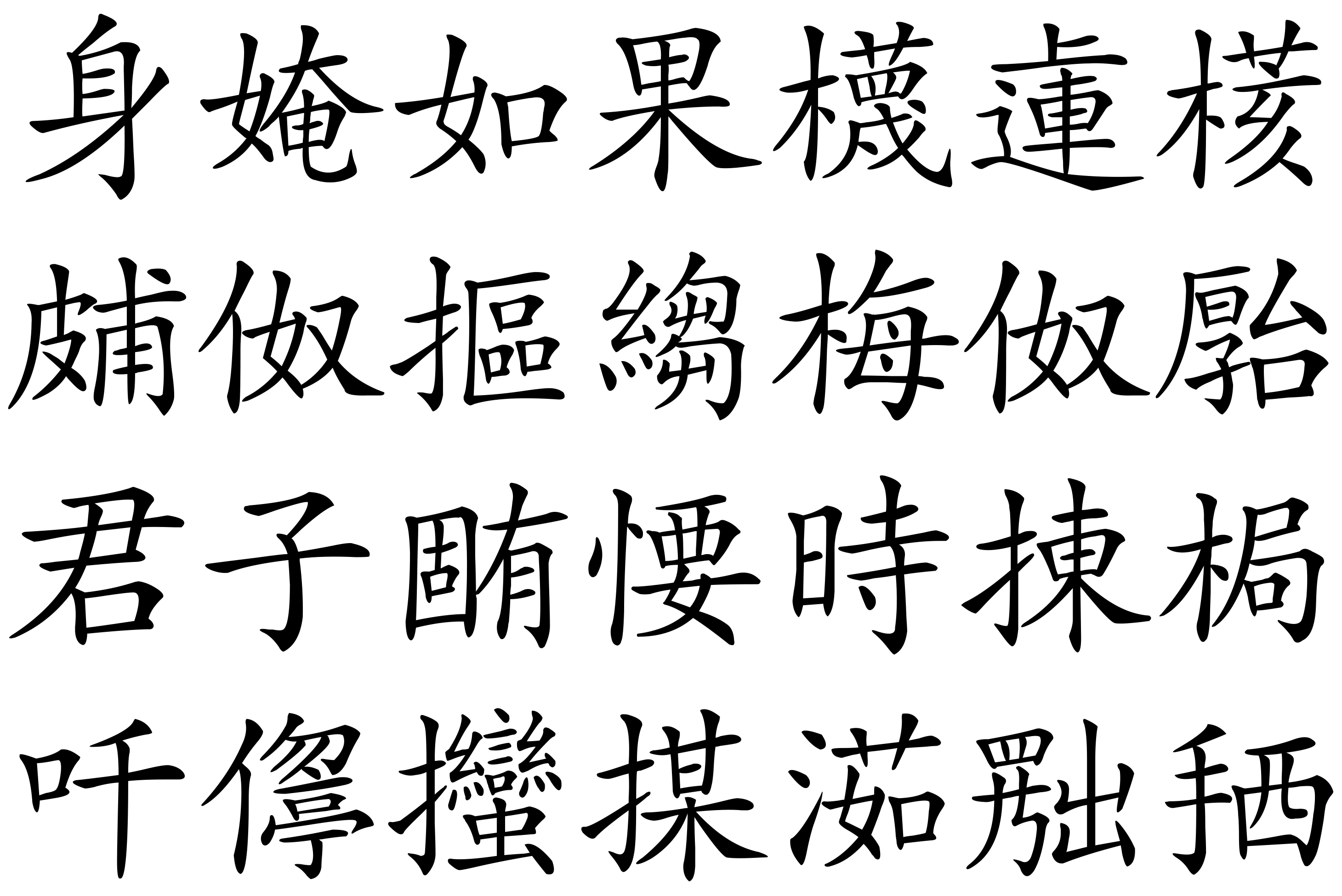
Quả Mít

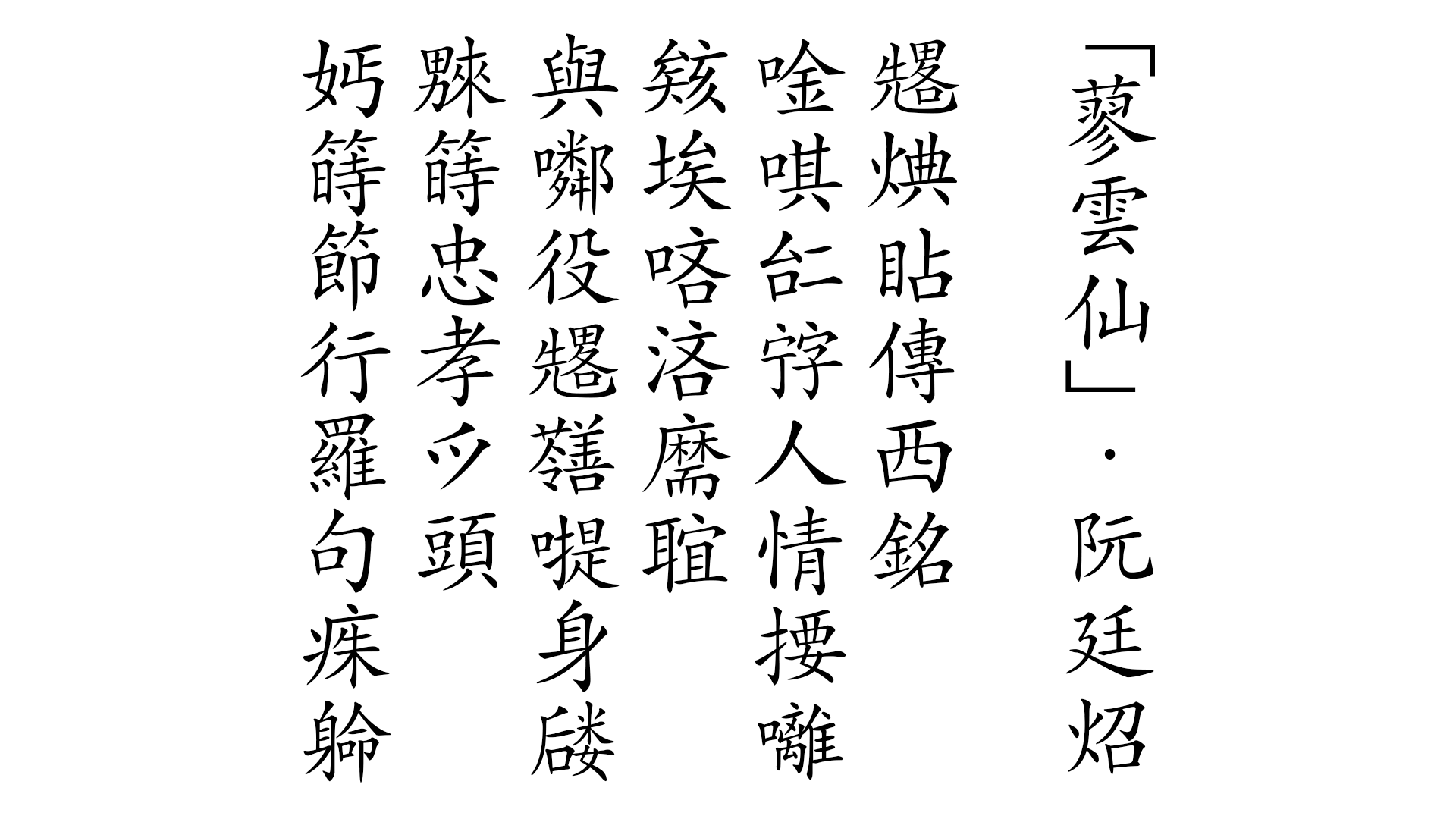
Lục Vân Tiên

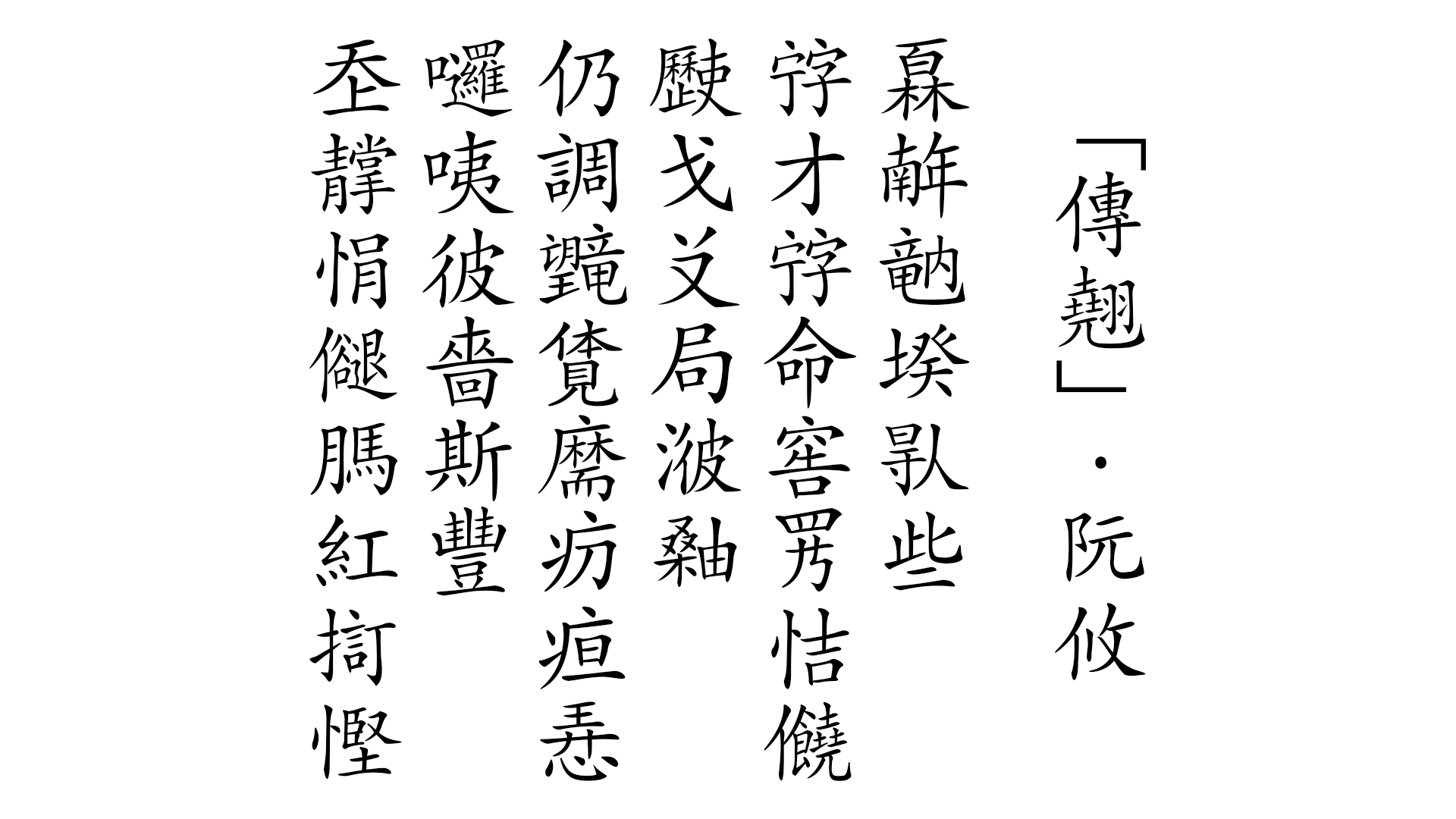
Truyện Kiều

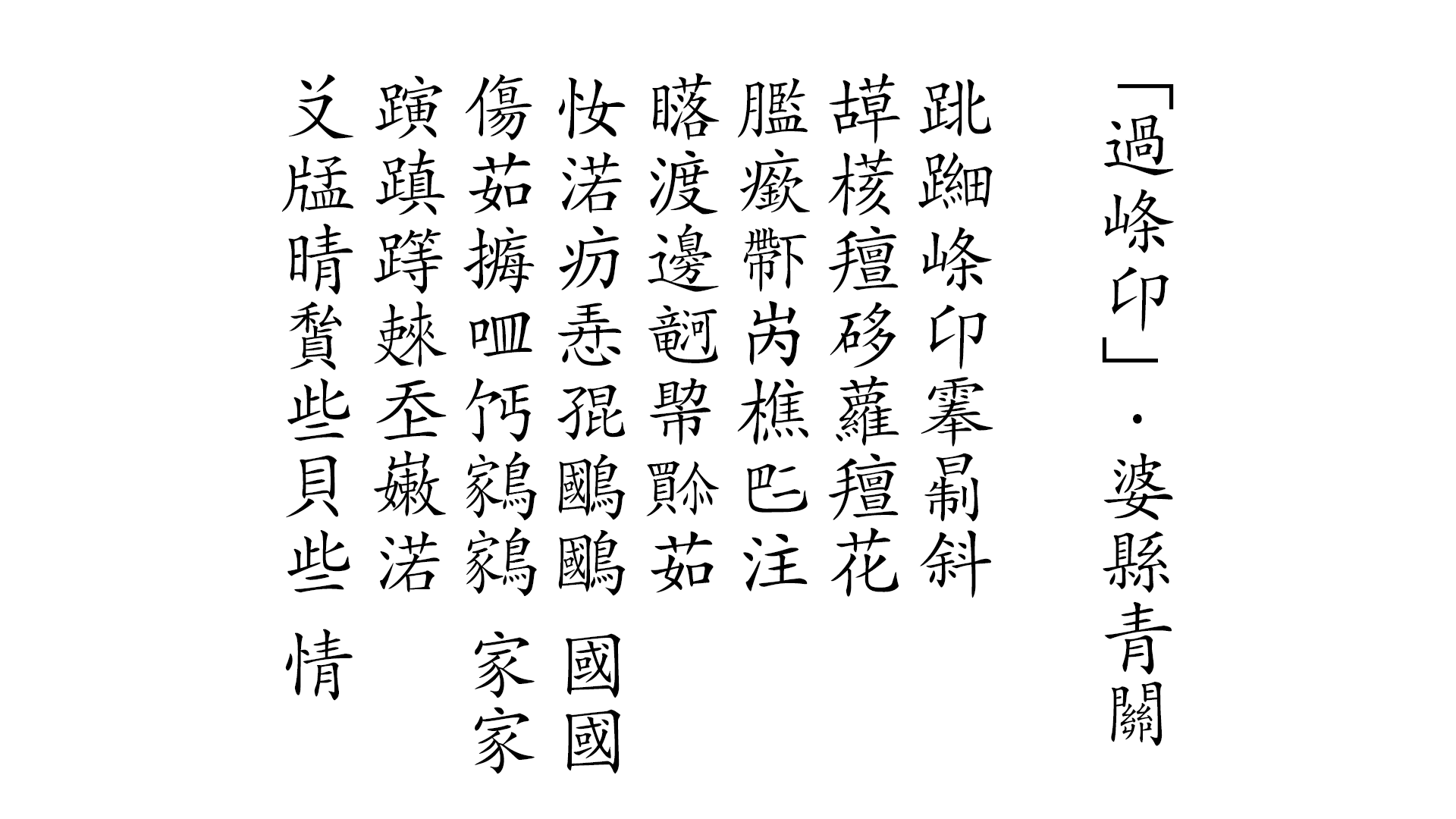
Qua đèo Ngang

=== Modern literature ===
While created in the seventeenth century, the Vietnamese alphabet was not widely used outside of missionary circles until the early 20th century, when the French colonial government mandated its use in French Indochina. During the early years of the twentieth century, many periodicals in Vietnamese alphabet flourished and their popularity helped popularize Vietnamese alphabet. The Self-Reliant Literary Association with its two weeklies Phong Hóa and Ngày Nay were among the most read newspapers at the time, and these two papers brought fame to many writers, including Khái Hưng, Nhất Linh, Xuân Diệu, Thế Lữ, Thạch Lam and Huy Cận. The success of The Self-Reliant Literary Association also inspired the development of modern literature during the 30s, a thriving period marked by the debuts of important writers, such as Nguyễn Tuân, Vũ Trọng Phụng, and Tô Hoài.

While some leaders resisted the popularity of Vietnamese alphabet as an imposition from the French, others embraced it as a convenient tool to boost literacy. After declaring independence from France in 1945, Empire of Vietnam's provisional government adopted a policy of increasing literacy with Vietnamese alphabet. Their efforts were hugely successful, as the literacy rate jumped overnight.

In those early years, there were many variations in orthography and there was no consensus on how to write certain words. After some conferences, the issues were mostly settled, but some still linger to this day. By the mid-20th century, all Vietnamese works of literature are written in Vietnamese alphabet, while works written in earlier scripts are transliterated into Vietnamese alphabet for accessibility to modern Vietnamese speakers. The use of the earlier scripts is now limited to historical references.

After the 1954 Geneva Conference, Vietnam was divided into North Vietnam and South Vietnam, and the literature of these two regions also developed in different directions. In the North, which hitherto formed an alliance with the Soviet Union, writers were under the control of the Communist Party, although there were some periods of turmoil among Northern writers when the government launched the land reform campaign or when Khrushchev came to power and denounced the legacy of Stalin. The most well-known writers in North Vietnam of this period were Tố Hữu, Nguyễn Đình Thi, Trần Dần, and Hoàng Cầm. In the South, which welcomed a wave of Northerners during the 1954–1955 Great Migration, the writers had more freedom in expressing their political beliefs. They gathered and discussed new styles and different philosophical viewpoints about writing through certain periodicals, one of which was Sáng Tạo magazine, founded by Thanh Tâm Tuyền and Mai Thảo. There was also one group called Quan Điểm, assembling Vũ Khắc Khoan, Mặc Đỗ and Nghiêm Xuân Hồng. South Vietnam's literature went through different ups and downs under the ruling of Ngô Đình Diệm and Nguyễn Văn Thiệu. Although it existed for only 20 years (1955-1975), South Vietnam literature witnessed the emergence of various great writers and novels.

Works in modern Vietnamese include:

- Việt Nam sử lược ( 越南史略) by Trần Trọng Kim, 1921
- Số đỏ by Vũ Trọng Phụng, 1936
- Mechanics and Crafts of the People of Annam, 1908 (Vietnamese is written in chữ Nôm.)

== See also ==
- Vietnamese art
- Vietnamese poetry
- Censorship in Vietnam
- List of libraries in Vietnam
