= Vietnamese poetry =

Poetic and literary tradition of Vietnam

Vietnamese poetry originated in the form of folk poetry and proverbs. Vietnamese poetic structures include Lục bát, Song thất lục bát, and various styles shared with Classical Chinese poetry forms, such as are found in Tang poetry; examples include verse forms with "seven syllables each line for eight lines," "seven syllables each line for four lines" (a type of quatrain), and "five syllables each line for eight lines." More recently there have been new poetry and free poetry.

With the exception of free poetry, a form with no distinct structure, other forms all have a certain structure. The tightest and most rigid structure was that of the Tang dynasty poetry, in which structures of content, number of syllables per line, lines per poem, rhythm rule determined the form of the poem. This stringent structure restricted Tang poetry to the middle and upper classes and academia.

== History ==
=== Beginnings ===
The first indication of Vietnamese literary activity dates back around 500 BCE during the Đông Sơn Bronze-age civilization. Poetic scenes of sun worship and musical festivity appeared on the famous eponymous drums of the period. Since music and poetry are often inextricable in the Vietnamese tradition, one could safely assume the Đông Sơn drums to be the earliest extant mark of poetry.

In 987 CE, Đỗ Pháp Thuần co-authored with Li Chueh, a Chinese ambassador in the early Lê dynasty by matching the latter's spontaneous oration in a four-verse poem called "Two Wild Geese". Poetry of the period proudly exhibited its Chinese legacy and achieved many benchmarks of classical Chinese literature. For this, China bestowed the title of Văn Hiến Chi Bang ("the Cultured State") on Vietnam.

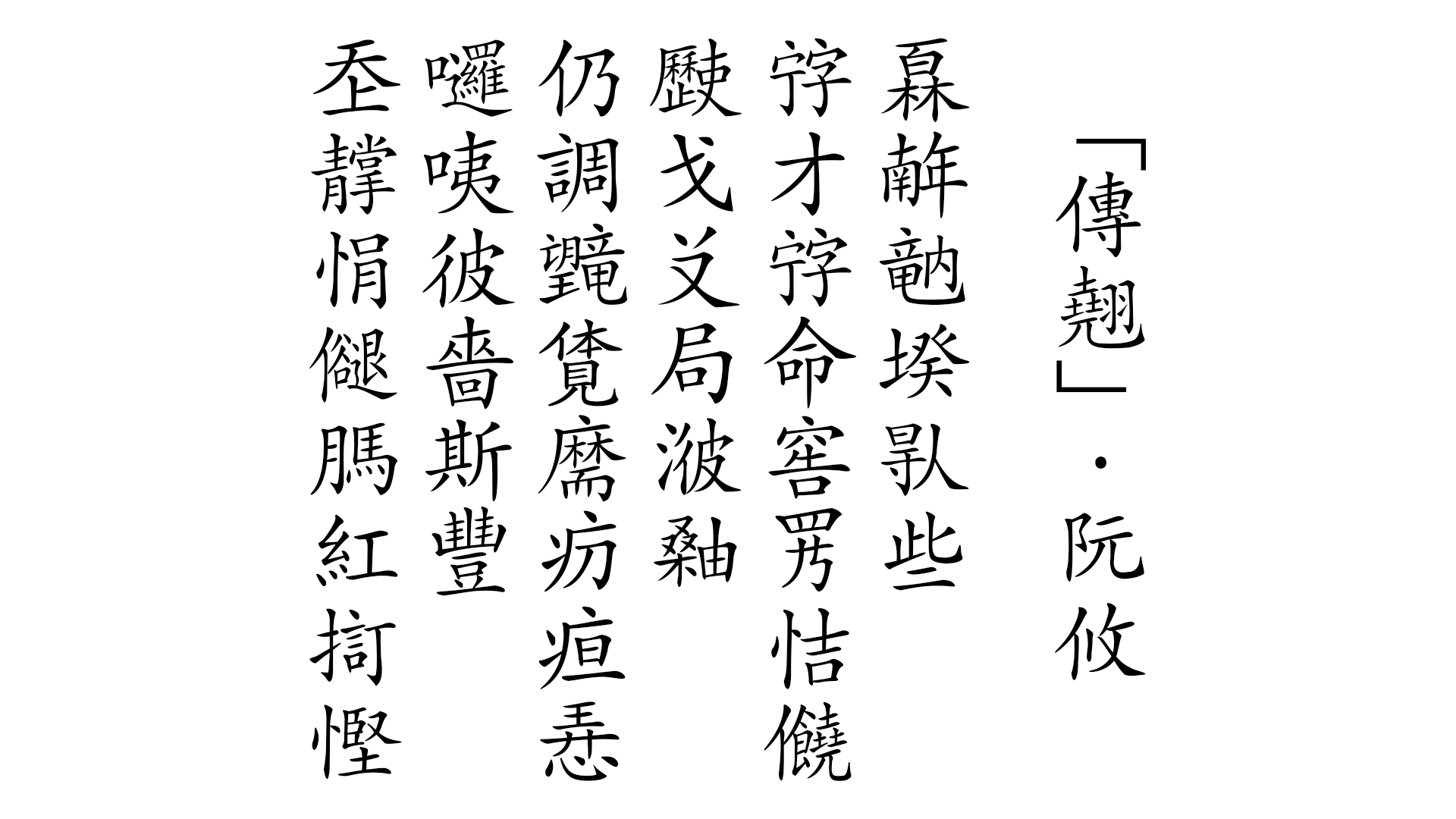
The first 6 lines of The Tale of Kiều by Nguyễn Du, exemplifying the chữ Nôm script, in use from around the thirteenth through early twentieth centuries

All the earliest literature from Vietnam is necessarily written in chữ Hán (though read in the Sino-Vietnamese.) No writing system for vernacular Vietnamese existed until the thirteenth century, when chữ Nôm ("Southern writing", often referred to simply as Nôm) — Vietnamese written using chữ Hán — was formalized. While Chinese remained the official written language for centuries, poets could now choose to write in the language of their choice.

Folk poetry presumably flourished alongside classical poetry, and reflected the common man's life with its levity, humor and irony. Since popular poetry was mostly anonymously composed, it was more difficult to date and trace the thematic development of the genre.

High-culture poetry in each period mirrored various sensibilities of the age. The poems of Lý dynasty (1010–1125) distinctively and predominantly feature Buddhist themes. Poetry then became progressively less religiously oriented in the following dynasty, the Trần dynasty (1125–1400), as Confucian scholars replaced Buddhist priest as the Emperors' political advisers. Three successive victorious defense against the Kublai Khan's Mongolian armies further emboldened Vietnamese literary endeavors, infusing poetry with celebratory patriotism.

=== Later Lê dynasty (1427-1788) ===
Literature in Chữ Nôm flourished in the fifteenth century during the Later Lê dynasty. Under the reign of Emperor Lê Thánh Tông (1460–1497), chữ Nôm enjoyed official endorsement and became the primary language of poetry. By this century, the creation of chữ Nôm symbolized the happy marriage between chữ Hán and vernacular elements and contributed to the blurring of the literary distinction between "high" and "low" cultures.

Due to the civil strife between Trịnh and Nguyễn lords and other reasons, poetic innovation continued, though at a slower pace from the late fifteenth century to the eighteenth century. The earliest chữ Nôm in phú, or rhymed verse, appeared in the sixteenth century. Also in the same period, the famous "seven-seven-six-eight" verse form was also invented. Verse novels (truyện) also became a major genre. It was around the fifteenth century that people started linking the traditional "six-eight" iambic couplet verses of folk poetry together, playing on the internal rhyming between the sixth syllable of the eight line and the last syllable of the six line, so that end rhyme mutates every two lines. Orally narrated verse novels using this verse pattern received immense popular support in a largely illiterate society.

In the 17th century, Francisco de Pina arrived in Vietnam (Đàng Trong) and was credited with the creation of the Vietnamese alphabet. In 1651, Alexandre de Rhodes, a Portuguese missionary and disciple of Francisco de Pina, published the first trilingual Vietnamese-Portuguese-Latin dictionary (Dictionarium Annamiticum Lusitanum et Latinum), which helped furthered the development of the Vietnamese alphabet, however, did not gain wide currency until the twentieth century.

=== Tây Sơn and Independent Nguyễn dynasty (1788-1862) ===
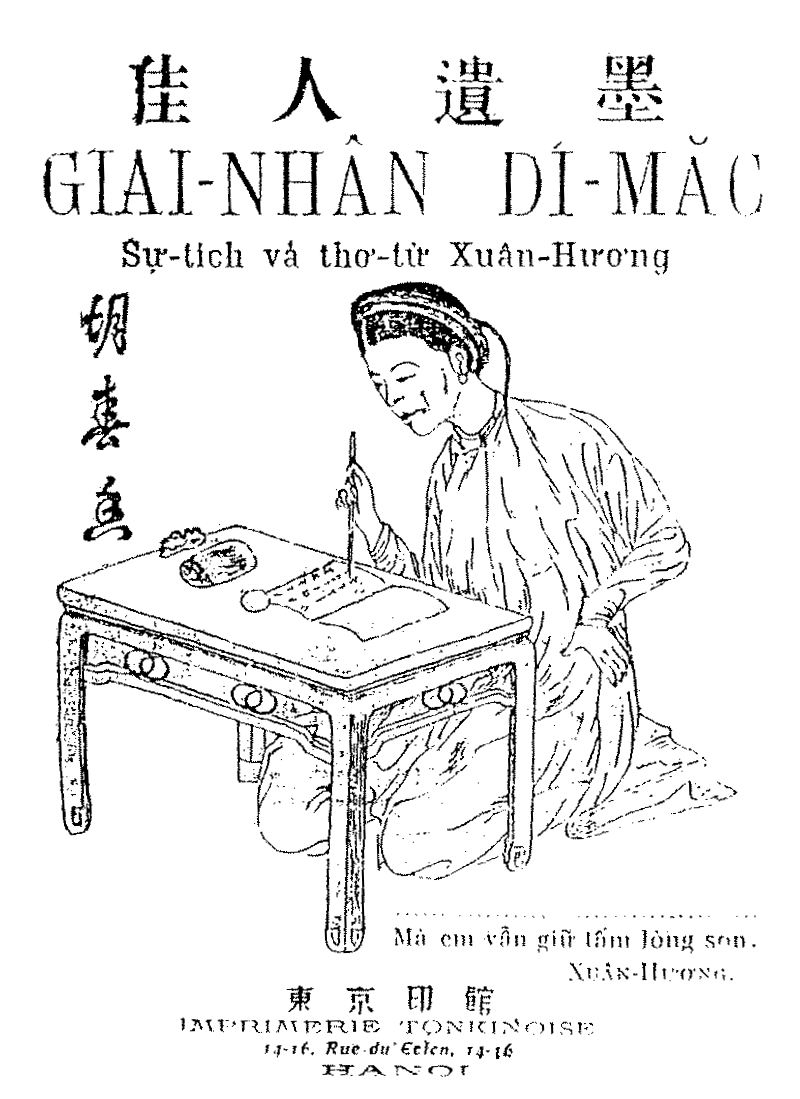
Hồ Xuân Hương, a witty and ribald poet

Itinerant performers recite these epic poems, the most famous of which is the Tale of Kiều by Nguyễn Du, often said to be the national poem of Vietnam. A contemporary of Nguyễn Du was Hồ Xuân Hương, a female author of masterful and boldly venereal verses.

=== French colonial period (1862-1945) ===
Starting from the 1930s, Vietnamese alphabet poems abounded, often referred to as Thơ mới ("New Poetry"), which borrowed from Western traditions in both its free verse form as well as modern existential themes.

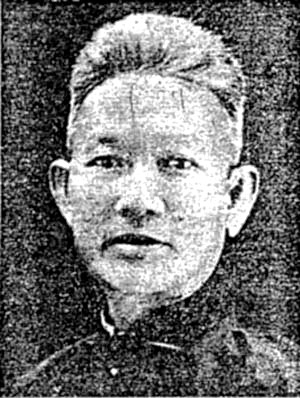
Tản Đà (Nguyễn Khắc Hiếu), a transitional figure

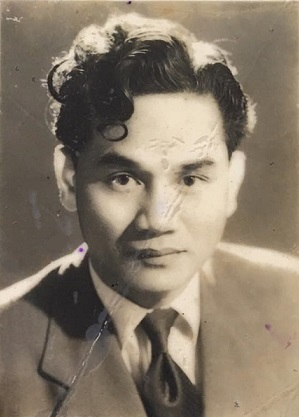
Xuân Diệu

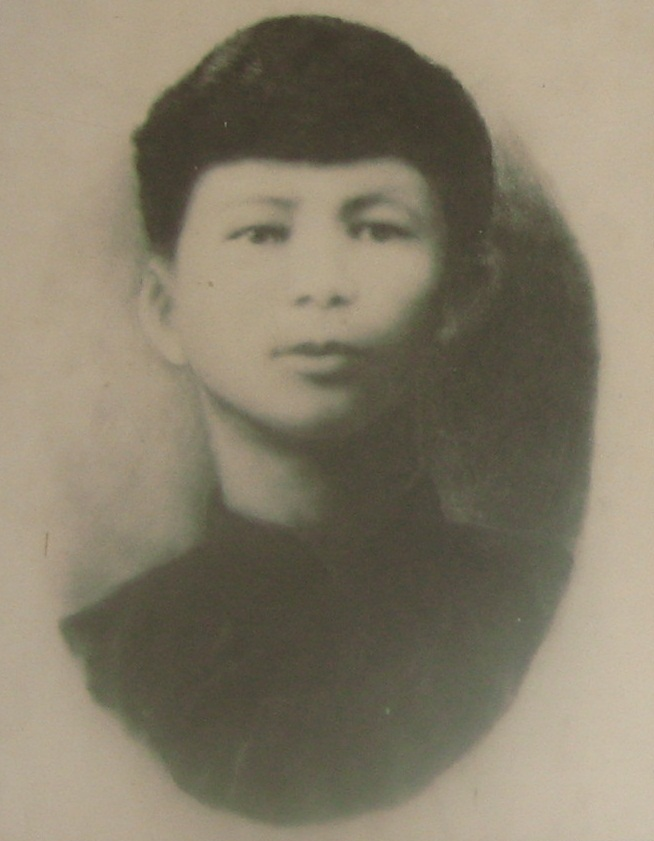
Hàn Mặc Tử (Nguyễn Trọng Trí)

Some prominent "New Poets"

=== Contemporary (1945-present) ===
The Second World War curbed some of this literary flourishing, though Vietnamese poetry would undergo a new period of development during the French resistance and the Vietnam War.

== Prosody ==
As in most metrical systems, Vietnamese meter is structured both by the count and the character of syllables. Whereas in English verse syllables are categorized by relative stress, and in classical Greek and Latin verse they are categorized by length, in Vietnamese verse (as in Chinese) syllables are categorized by tone. For metrical purposes, the 6 distinct phonemic tones that occur in Vietnamese are all considered as either "flat" or "sharp". Thus a line of metrical verse consists of a specific number of syllables, some of which must be flat, some of which must be sharp, and some of which may be either.

Like verse in Chinese and most European languages, traditional Vietnamese verse is rhymed. The combination of meter and rhyme scheme defines the verse form in which a poem is written.

Traditionally in Vietnamese 1 word = 1 character = 1 syllable. Thus discussions of poetry may refer, for example, to a seven-word line of verse, or to the tone of a word. In this discussion, syllable is taken to be the least-ambiguous term for the foundational prosodic unit.

=== Vowels and tones ===
Vowels can be simple (à, ca, cha, đá, lá, ta) or compound (biên, chiêm, chuyên, xuyên), and one of six tones is applied to every vowel.

| Tone Class | Tone | Diacritic | Listen |
|---|---|---|---|
| Flat (bằng) | level | a (no diacritic) | level |
| Flat (bằng) | hanging | à | hanging |
| Sharp (trắc) | tumbling | ã | tumbling |
| Sharp (trắc) | asking | ả | asking |
| Sharp (trắc) | sharp | á | sharp |
| Sharp (trắc) | heavy | ạ | heavy |

In order to correspond more closely with Chinese rules of versification, older analyses sometimes consider Vietnamese to have eight tones rather than six. This is due to the Chinese classification of tones which Vietnamese no longer uses due to the switch from chữ Nôm to the Vietnamese alphabet. However, the additional two tones are not phonemic in Vietnamese and in any case roll up to the same sharp tone class as they do in a six-tone analysis.

=== Rhyme ===
Use of rhyme in Vietnamese poetry is largely analogous to its use in English and other European languages; two important differences are the salience of tone class in the acceptability of rhymed syllables, and the prominence of structural back rhyme (rhyming a syllable at the end of one line with a syllable in the middle of the next). Rhyme connects lines in a poem together, almost always occurring on the final syllable of a line, and sometimes including syllables within the line.

In principle, Vietnamese rhymes exhibit the same features as English rhymes: Given that every syllable consists of CVC — an optional initial consonant or consonant cluster + a vowel (simple or compound) + an optional final consonant or consonant cluster — a "true" rhyme comprises syllables with different initial C and identical VC. However additional features are salient in Vietnamese verse.

Rhyming syllables do not require identical tones, but must be of the same tone class: either all flat (e.g. dâu, màu, sầu), or all sharp (e.g. đấy, cấy). Flat rhymes tend to create a feeling of gentleness and smoothness, whereas sharp rhymes create a feeling of roughness, motion, wakefulness.

Rhyme can be further classified as "rich" or "poor". Rich rhyme (not to be confused with Rime riche) has the same tone class, and the same vowel sound: flat (Phương, sương, cường, trường) or sharp (Thánh, cảnh, lãnh, ánh).

Lầu Tần chiều nhạt vẻ thu
Gối loan tuyết đóng, chăn cù giá đông

Poor rhyme has the same tone class, but slightly different vowel sounds: flat (Minh, khanh, huỳnh, hoành) or sharp (Mến, lẽn, quyện, hển)

Người lên ngựa kẻ chia bào
Rừng phong thu đã nhuộm màu quan san

Finally, poets may sometimes use a "slant rhyme":

Người về chiếc bóng năm canh
Kẻ đi muôn dặm một mình xa xôi

== Verse form ==
=== Regulated verse ===
The earliest extant poems by Vietnamese poets are in fact written in the Chinese language, in Chinese characters, and in Chinese verse forms — specifically the regulated verse (luật thi) of the Tang dynasty. These strict forms were favored by the intelligentsia, and competence in composition was required for civil service examinations. Regulated verse — later written in Vietnamese as well as Chinese — has continued to exert an influence on Vietnamese poetry throughout its history.

At the heart of this family of forms are four related verse types: two with five syllables per line, and two with seven syllables per line; eight lines constituting a complete poem in each. Not only are syllables and lines regulated, so are rhymes, Level and Deflected tones (corresponding closely to the Vietnamese flat and sharp), and a variety of "faults" which are to be avoided. While Chinese poets favored the 5-syllable forms, Vietnamese poets favored the 7-syllable forms, so the first of these seven-syllable forms is represented here in its standard Tang form:

| L | L / | D | D / | D | L | LA |
| D | D / | L | L / | D | D | LA |
| D | D / | L | L / | L | D | D |
| L | L / | D | D / | D | L | LA |
| L | L / | D | D / | L | L | D |
| D | D / | L | L / | D | D | LA |
| D | D / | L | L / | L | D | D |
| L | L / | D | D / | D | L | LA |

L = Level syllable; D = Deflected syllable; LA = Level syllable with "A" rhyme; / = pause.

The other seven-syllable form is identical, but with (for the most part) opposite assignments of Level and Deflected syllables. 5-syllable forms are similarly structured, but with 2+3 syllable lines, rather than 2+2+3. All forms might optionally omit the rhyme at the end of the first line, necessitating tone alterations in the final three syllables. An additional stricture was that the two central couplets should be antithetical.

Tang poetics allowed additional variations: The central 2 couplets could form a complete four-line poem (tuyệt câu), or their structure could be repeated to form a poem of indefinite length (bài luật).

While Vietnamese poets have embraced regulated verse, they have at times loosened restrictions, even taking frankly experimental approaches such as composing in six-syllable lines. Though less prestigious (in part because it was not an element of official examinations), they have also written in the similar but freer Chinese "old style" (cổ thi).

=== Lục bát ===
In contrast to the learned, official, and foreign nature of regulated verse, Vietnam also has a rich tradition of native, demotic, and vernacular verse. While lines with an odd number of syllables were favored by Chinese aesthetics, lines with an even number of syllables were favored in Vietnamese folk verse. Lục bát ("six-eight") has been embraced as the verse form par excellence of Vietnam. Currently, the oldest Lục bát with a clear date that has been preserved until now is Nguyen Hy Quang's "Cảm tác" composed in 1674. The name denotes the number of syllables in each of the two lines of the couplet. Like regulated verse, lục bát relies on syllable count, tone class, and rhyme for its structure; however, it is much less minutely regulated, and incorporates an interlocking rhyme scheme which links chains of couplets:

| • | ♭ | • | ♯ | • | ♭A |
| • | ♭ | • | ♯ | • | ♭A | • | ♭B |
| • | ♭ | • | ♯ | • | ♭B |
| • | ♭ | • | ♯ | • | ♭B | • | ♭C |
| • | ♭ | • | ♯ | • | ♭C |
| • | ♭ | • | ♯ | • | ♭C | • | ♭D |

• = any syllable; ♭ = flat (bằng) syllable; ♯ = sharp (trắc) syllable; ♭A = flat syllable with "A" rhyme.
♭ and ♯ are used only as handy mnemonic symbols; no connection with music should be inferred.

The verse also tends toward an iambic rhythm (one unstressed syllable followed by one stressed syllable), so that the even syllables (those mandatorily sharp or flat) also tend to be stressed. While sharp tones provide variety within lines, flat tones dominate, and only flat tones are used in rhymes. Coupled with a predominantly steady iambic rhythm, the form may suggest a steady flow, which has recommended itself to narrative. Poets occasionally vary the form; for example, the typically flat second syllable of a "six" line may be replaced with a sharp for variety.

Lục bát poems may be of any length: they may consist of just one couplet — as for example a proverb, riddle, or epigram — or they may consist of any number of linked couplets ranging from a brief lyric to an epic poem.

A formal paraphrase of the first six lines of The Tale of Kiều suggests the effect of syllable count, iambic tendency, and interlocking rhyme (English has no analogue for tone):

Trăm năm trong cõi người ta,
Chữ tài chữ mệnh khéo là ghét nhau.
Trải qua một cuộc bể dâu,
Những điều trông thấy mà đau đớn lòng.
Lạ gì bỉ sắc tư phong,
Trời xanh quen thói má hồng đánh ghen.

Translation:

A century of life
Sees genius aye in strife with doom:
As hills for vales make room
These visions dire consume the soul.
Surprised by joy with dole?
Once-rosy cheek, heav'n's toll is paid.

=== Song thất lục bát ===
Vietnam's second great native verse form intricately counterpoises several opposing poetic tendencies. Song thất lục bát ("double-seven six-eight") refers to an initial doublet — two lines of seven syllables each — linked by rhyme to a following lục bát couplet:

| • | • | ♯ | • | ♭ | • | ♯A |
| • | • | ♭ | • | ♯A | • | ♭B |
| | • | ♭ | • | ♯ | • | ♭B |
| | • | ♭ | • | ♯ | • | ♭B | • | ♭C |
| • | • | ♯ | • | ♭C | • | ♯D |
| • | • | ♭ | • | ♯D | • | ♭E |
| | • | ♭ | • | ♯ | • | ♭E |
| | • | ♭ | • | ♯ | • | ♭E | • | ♭F |

• = any syllable; ♭ = flat (bằng) syllable; ♯ = sharp (trắc) syllable; ♯A = sharp syllable with "A" rhyme.

In contrast to the lục bát couplet, the song thất doublet exactly balances the number of required flat and sharp syllables, but emphasises the sharp with two rhymes. It bucks the tendency of even-syllabled lines in Vietnamese folk verse, calling to mind the scholarly poetic tradition of China. It necessitates the incorporation of anapestic rhythms (unstressed-unstressed-stressed) which are present but comparatively rare in the lục bát alone. Overall, the quatrain suggests tension, followed by resolution. It has been used in many genres, "[b]ut its great strength is the rendering of feelings and emotions in all their complexity, in long lyrics. Its glory rests chiefly on three works ... 'A song of sorrow inside the royal harem' ... by Nguyễn Gia Thiều, 'Calling all souls' ... by Nguyễn Du, and 'The song of a soldier's wife' ... [by] Phan Huy Ích".

The song thất doublet is rarely used on its own — it is almost always paired with a lục bát couplet. Whereas a series of linked song thất lục bát quatrains — or occasionally just a single quatrain — is the most usual form, other variations are possible. A sequence may begin with a lục bát couplet; in this case the sequence must still end with a lục bát. Alternatively, song thất doublets may be randomly interspersed within a long lục bát poem. Poets occasionally vary the form; for example, for variety the final syllable of an "eight" line may rhyme with the third — instead of the fifth — syllable of the initial "seven" line of the following quatrain.

=== Other verse forms ===
Stanzas defined only by end-rhyme include:

- ABAB (alternate rhyme, analogous to the Sicilian quatrain, or Common measure)
- xAxA (intermittent rhyme, analogous to many of the English and Scottish Ballads) Additional structure may be provided by the final syllables of odd lines ("x") being in the opposite tone class to the rhyming ones, creating a tone class scheme (though not a rhyme scheme) of ABAB.
- ABBA (envelope rhyme, analogous to the "In Memoriam" stanza) In this stanza, if the "A" rhyme is sharp, then the "B" rhyme is flat, and vice versa.
- AAxA (analogous to the Rubaiyat stanza)
- Couplets, in which flat couplets and sharp couplets alternate (for example Xuân Diệu's Tương Tư Chiều):

| Bữa nay lạnh mặt trời đi ngủ sớm, |
| Anh nhớ em, em hỡi! Anh nhớ em. | A (flat rhyme) |
| Không gì buồn bằng những buổi chiều êm, | A (flat rhyme) |
| Mà ánh sáng đều hòa cùng bóng tối. | B (sharp rhyme) |
| Gió lướt thướt kéo mình qua cỏ rối; | B (sharp rhyme) |
| Vài miếng đêm u uất lẩn trong cành; | C (flat rhyme) |
| Mây theo chim về dãy núi xa xanh | C (flat rhyme) |
| Từng đoàn lớp nhịp nhàng và lặng lẽ. | D (sharp rhyme) |
| Không gian xám tưởng sắp tan thành lệ. | D (sharp rhyme) |

A poem in serial rhyme exhibits the same rhyme at the end of each line for an indefinite number of lines, then switches to another rhyme for an indefinite period. Within rhyming blocks, variety can be achieved by the use of both rich and poor rhyme.

==== Four syllable poetry ====
If second syllable is flat rhyme then the fourth syllable is sharp rhyme

| Line number | Rhyme | | | |
| 1 | | T | | B |
| 2 | | B | | T |
| Word number | 1 | 2 | 3 | 4 |

Bão đến ầm ầm
Như đoàn tàu hỏa

The converse is true

| Line number | Rhyme | | | |
| 1 | | B | | T |
| 2 | | T | | B |
| Syllable number | 1 | 2 | 3 | 4 |

Chim ngoài cửa sổ
Mổ tiếng võng kêu

However a lot of poems do not conform to the above rule:

Bão đi thong thả
Như con bò gầy

==== Five-syllable poetry ====
Similar to four-syllable poetry, it also has its own exceptions.

Hôm nay đi chùa Hương
Hoa cỏ mờ hơi sương
Cùng thầy me em dậy
Em vấn đầu soi gương

==== Six syllable poetry ====
Using the last syllable, với cách with rhyme rule like vần chéo or vần ôm:

Vần chéo

Quê hương là gì hở mẹ
Mà cô giáo dạy phải yêu
Quê hương là gì hở mẹ
Ai đi xa cũng nhớ nhiều

Đỗ Trung Quân - Quê Hương

Vần ôm

Xuân hồng có chàng tới hỏi:
-- Em thơ, chị đẹp em đâu?
-- Chị tôi tóc xõa ngang đầu
Đi bắt bướm vàng ngoài nội

Huyền Kiêu - Tình sầu

==== Seven syllable poetry ====
The influence of Seven syllable, four line in Tang poetry can still be seen in the rhyme rule of seven-syllable poetry. 2 kinds of line:

Flat rhyme

| Line number | Rhyme | | | | | | |
| 1 | | B | | T | | B | B |
| 2 | | T | | B | | T | B |
| 3 | | T | | B | | T | T |
| 4 | | B | | T | | B | B |
| Syllable number | 1 | 2 | 3 | 4 | 5 | 6 | 7 |

Quanh năm buôn bán ở mom sông
Nuôi đủ năm con với một chồng
Lặn lội thân cò khi quãng vắng
Eo sèo mặt nước buổi đò đông

Or more recently

Em ở thành Sơn chạy giặc về
Tôi từ chinh chiến cũng ra đi
Cách biệt bao ngày quê Bất Bạt
Chiều xanh không thấy bóng Ba Vì

Quang Dũng - Đôi Mắt Người Sơn Tây

Sharp rhyme

| Line number | Rhyme | | | | | | |
| 1 | | T | | B | | T | B |
| 2 | | B | | T | | B | B |
| 3 | | B | | T | | B | T |
| 4 | | T | | B | | T | B |
| Syllable number | 1 | 2 | 3 | 4 | 5 | 6 | 7 |

Lẳng lặng mà nghe nó chúc nhau:
Chúc nhau trăm tuổi bạc đầu râu
Phen này ông quyết đi buôn cối
Thiên hạ bao nhiêu đứa giã trầu

Recently this form has been modified to be:

| Line number | Rhyme | | | | | | |
| 1 | | B | | T | | B | |
| 2 | | T | | B | | T | |
| Syllable number | 1 | 2 | 3 | 4 | 5 | 6 | 7 |

Ta về cúi mái đầu sương điểm
Nghe nặng từ tâm lượng đất trời
Cảm ơn hoa đã vì ta nở
Thế giới vui từ mỗi lẻ loi

Tô Thùy Yên - Ta về

==== Eight-syllable poetry ====
This form of poetry has no specified rule, or free rhyme. Usually if:

- The last line has sharp rhyme then word number three is sharp rhyme, syllable number five and six are flat rhyme

| | Rhyme | | | | | | | |
| | | | T | | B | B | | T |
| Syllable number | 1 | 2 | 3 | 4 | 5 | 6 | 7 | 8 |

- The last line has flat rhyme then word number three is flat rhyme, word number five and six are sharp rhyme

| | Rhyme | | | | | | | |
| | | | B | | T | T | | B |
| Syllable number | 1 | 2 | 3 | 4 | 5 | 6 | 7 | 8 |

But there are always exceptions.

=== Ca dao ===
Ca dao meaning folk songs, are poems which were derived from folk songs that were rewritten to be recited. Because of this, refrains are never used in ca dao, even though they are used in the folk songs that ca dao poems derive from. Ca dao is a Sino-Vietnamese term, 歌謠, the term is derived from the Classic of Poetry (Kinh Thi). Ca dao poems generally tell stories of everyday life. Most ca dao poems tend to be short, at most one couplet of fourteen syllables. But ca dao poems longer than that do exist.

Ca dao can consist of four-syllable lines, five-syllable lines, six-eight or two seven six eight, can be sung wholecloth, without the need to insert fillers like when people recite the poetry. For example, take the following four syllable verse:

Gió đập cành đa,
Gió đánh, cành đa.
Thầy nghĩ là ma,
Thầy vùng thầy chạy.
Ba thằng ba gậy.
Đi đón thầy về.

Translation:

Wind smacks the banyan trees.
Wind thwacks, the banyan shook.
Dad thinks it was a spook.
Dad runs, Dad flees.
Three boys with three canes
Had to go fetch Dad again.

Some folk tales are also told through ca dao, ca dao often has analogies drawn between humans, animals, and plant life. But the most common themes of ca dao are themes about the relationship between the opposite sex. Themes about lost love, husbands complaining about wives, wives complaining about husbands, etc.

Here is an example about a monk and a nun:

Ông sư chống gậy lù khù,
Hỏi thăm bà vãi: chùa Mu đằng nào?
Bà vãi mới khẽ thì thào:
Đi qua quán Rốn thì vào chùa Mu.

Translation:

Stooping on a cane, a monk asked,
"Which way to Mound Temple, Nun?"
"Go pass Bellybutton Inn," whispered nun,
"You'll enter Mound Temple."

Another example of a ca dao poem about the moon:

Gió đưa trăng thì trăng đưa gió.
Trăng lặn rồi gió biết đưa ai?

Translation:

The wind escorts the moon; the moon escorts the wind.
When the moon sets, who can the wind be with?

Example about animals:

Con gà cục tác lá chanh.
Con lợn ủn ỉn mua hành cho tôi.
Con chó khóc đứng khóc ngồi.
Mẹ ơi, đi chợ mua tôi đồng riềng.

Translation:

The chicken clucked, pecked on a lime leaf.
The pig goes, oink, oink, buy me an onion.
The dog sobbed standing up, sobbed sitting down,
Said, Mother, please, buy me a dime's worth of galingale.

=== Free poetry movement ===
The Vietnamese "free poetry" movement may have started from the poems translated from French by Nguyễn Văn Vĩnh, such as La Cigale et la Fourmi (from the fables of Jean de La Fontaine) in Trung Bắc Tân văn (1928).

Ve sầu kêu ve ve
Suốt mùa hè
Đến kỳ gió bấc thổi
Nguồn cơn thật bối rối.

Poetry with no prosody, no rule, no limits on the number of words in the line, no line limits, appears to have been more adapted to a mass audience.

With the free poetry using the "dong gay" technique, presenting long lines and short, to create a visual rhythm, when read aloud, not according to line but to sentence, with the aim to hear properly the sound of each word. Visual rhythm is the most important thing, because through it, the reader can follow the analytic process to figure out the meaning of the poem. The word "free" can be understood as the escape from the restraint of poetry rules. The poets want to chase after his inspirations and emotions, using words to describe inner feelings instead of being constrained by words, by rules. They do not have to be constrained by criticism until they have to change the words, ideas until the poem becomes a monster child of their emotions. For example, in Lưu Trọng Lư's Tiếng thu (1939)

Năm vừa rồi
Chàng cùng tôi
Nơi vùng giác mộ
Trong gian nhà cỏ

Tôi quay tơ
Chàng ngâm thơ
Vườn sau oanh giục giã
Nhìn ra hoa đua nở

Dừng tay tôi kêu chàng...
Này, này! Bạn! Xuân sang
Chàng nhìn xuân mặt hớn hở
Tôi nhìn chàng, long vồn vã...

Rồi ngày lại ngày
Sắc màu: phai
Lá cành: rụng
Ba gian: trống

Xuân đi
Chàng cũng đi
Năm nay xuân còn trở lại
Người xưa không thấy tới

Xuân về.

which later becomes Hữu Thỉnh trong bài Thơ viết ở biển:

Anh xa em
Trăng cũng lẻ
Mặt trời cũng lẻ
Biển vẫn cậy mình dài rộng thế
Vắng cánh buồm một chút
đã cô đơn

Gió không phải là roi mà vách núi phải mòn
Em không phải là chiều mà nhuộm anh đến tím
Sông chẳng đi đến đâu
nếu không đưa em đến

Dù sóng đã làm anh
Nghiêng ngả
Vì em

== Poetical devices ==
The musical nature of Vietnamese poetry manifests in the use of onomatopoeic words like "ri rao" (rustling), "vi vut" (whistling), "am am" (banging), "lanh canh" (tinkling), etc. Word play abounds in Vietnamese poetry.

Imagery, or the use of words to create images, is another fundamental aspect of Vietnamese poetry. An example of imagery can be found in the national epic poem, The Tale of Kiều by Nguyễn Du (1765–1820):

Cỏ non xanh tận chân trời
Cành lê trắng điểm một vài bông hoa

Due to the influence of the concept of visual arts in the times of the poet, Nguyễn Du usually employs "scenery description" style in his poems. Simple scenery, accentuated at certain points, gently sketched but irresistible. Another line by Bà Huyện Thanh Quan, uses Vietnamese reduplication and word play to portray the scenes that Bà Huyện Thanh Quan is trying to show,

Lom khom dưới núi tiều vài chú
Lác đác bên sông chợ mấy nhà

Or Nguyễn Khuyến:

Ao thu lạnh lẽo nước trong veo
Một chiếc thuyền câu bé tẻo teo
Sóng biếc theo làn hơi gợn tí
Lá vàng trước gió khẽ đưa vèo.

Or most recently Trần Đăng Khoa in Nghe thầy đọc thơ

Em nghe thầy đọc bao ngày
Tiếng thơ đỏ nắng, xanh cây quanh nhà
Mái chèo nghiêng mặt sông xa
Bâng khuâng nghe vọng tiếng bà năm xưa

These images are beautiful and tranquil, but they can also be non-static and lively. When objects are described in poetry, they are often personified. Using verbs for inanimate, insentient objects is akin to breathing life into the objects, making it lively in the mind of the reader. For instance, Trần Đăng Khoa wrote in "Mặt bão":

Bão đến ầm ầm
Như đoàn tàu hỏa
Bão đi thong thả
Như con bò gầy

Or in Góc Hà Nội

Nắng tháng tư xỏa mặt
Che vội vàng nỗi nhớ đã ra hoa
...
Thành phố ngủ trong rầm rì tiếng gió
Nhà ai quên khép cửa
Giấc ngủ thôi miên cả bến tàu

Such lines contain metaphors and similes. Humorous metaphors are commonly seen in poetry written for children. Examples are these lines that Khoa wrote at 9 years old in Buổi sáng nhà em:

Ông trời nổi lửa đằng đông
Bà sân vấn chiếc khăn hồng đẹp thay
...
Chị tre chải tóc bên ao
Nàng mây áo trắng ghé vào soi gương
Bác nồi đồng hát bùng boong
Bà chổi loẹt quẹt lom khom trong nhà

However, these also appear in more mature poets' work. For example, Nguyễn Mỹ in Con đường ấy:

Nắng bay từng giọt - nắng ngân vang
Ở trong nắng có một ngàn cái chuông

Or Hàn Mặc Tử in Một Nửa Trăng

Hôm nay chỉ có nửa trăng thôi
Một nửa trăng ai cắn vỡ rồi

Particularly, the metaphors in Hồ Xuân Hương poetry causes the half-real, half-unreal state, as if teasing the reader as in "Chess"

Quân thiếp trắng, quân chàng đen,
Hai quân ấy chơi nhau đà đã lửa.
Thọat mới vào chàng liền nhảy ngựa,
Thiếp vội vàng vén phứa tịnh lên.
Hai xe hà, chàng gác hai bên,
Thiếp thấy bí, thiếp liền ghểnh sĩ.

Or in Ốc nhồi

Bác mẹ sinh ra phận ốc nhồi,
Đêm ngày lăn lóc đám cỏ hôi.
Quân tử có thương thì bóc yếm,
Xin đừng ngó ngoáy lỗ trôn tôi.

The "tứ" (theme) of a poem is the central emotion or image the poem wants to communicate. "Phong cách" (style) is the choice of words, the method to express ideas. Structure of the poetry is the form and the ideas of the poems combined.

=== Điệu (rhythm) ===
Điệu (rhythm) is created by the sounds of selected words and cadence of the lines. Music in the poetry is constituted by 3 elements: rhyme, cadence and syllabic sound. "Six-eight" folk song is a form of poetry rich in musical quality.

- Cadence of lines: Cadence refers to the tempo, rhythm of the poem, based on how the lines are truncated into verses, each verse with a complete meaning. It is "long cadence" when people stop and dwell on the sound when they recite the line. Besides, in each verse, when reciting impromptu, we can also stop to dwell on shorter sounds at verses separated into components, which is called "short cadence"

Dương gian (-) hé rạng (-) hình hài (--)
Trời (-) se sẽ lạnh (-), đất ngai (--) ngái mùi(--)

- Cadence in poetry, created by the compartmentalization of the line and the words, similar to putting punctuations in sentence, so we pause when we read Nhịp (4/4) - (2/2/2/2)

Rhythm (4/4) - (2/2/2/2)

Em ngồi cành trúc (--) em tựa cành mai (--)
Đông đào (-) tây liễu (-) biết ai (-) bạn cùng (--)

Rhythm (2/2/2) - (2/2/2/2)

Trời mưa (-) ướt bụi (-) ướt bờ (-)
Ướt cây (-) ướt lá (--) ai ngờ (-) ướt em (--)

Rhythm (2/4) - (2/2/2/2)

Yêu mình (--) chẳng lấy được mình (--)
Tựa mai (-) mai ngã (--) tựa đình (-) đình xiêu (--)

Rhythm (2/4) - (4/4)

Đố ai (-) quét sạch lá rừng (--)
Để ta khuyên gió (--) gió đừng rung cây (--)

Rhythm (2/4) - (2/4/2)

Hỡi cô (-) tát nước bên đàng (--)
Sao cô (-) múc ánh trăng vàng (--) đổ đi (--)

Rhythm (4/2) - (2/4/2)

Trách người quân tử (-) bạc tình (--)
Chơi hoa (--) rồi lại bẻ cành (--) bán rao (--)

Rhythm (3/2/2) - (4/3/2)

Đạo vợ chồng (-) thăm thẳm (-) giếng sâu (--)
Ngày sau cũng gặp (--) mất đi đâu (-) mà phiền (--)

- Musical quality of words: according to linguistics, each simple word of Vietnamese is a syllable, which can be strong or weak, pure or muddled, depending on the position of the pronunciation in the mouth (including lips, air pipe and also the openness of the mouth) One word is pronounced at a position in the mouth is affected by 4 elements constituting it: vowel, first consonant, last consonant and tone. Hence words that have

1. "up" vowel like : i, ê, e
2. "resounding" consonant like: m, n, nh, ng
3. "up sound" : level, sharp, asking tones

Then when the words get pronounced, the sound produced will be pure, high and up. On the other hand, words that have

1. "down" vowel: u, ô, o,
2. "dead-end" consonant: p, t, ch, c,

And "down" tone: hanging, tumbling and heavy tones then the word pronounced will be muddled and heavy

The purity of the words punctuate the line. Rhyming syllables are most essential to the musical quality of the poem.

Hôm qua (-) tát nước đầu đình (--)
Bỏ quên cái áo (-) Trên cành hoa sen (--)
Em được (--) thì cho anh xin (--)
Hay là (-) em để làm tin (-) trong nhà. (--)

Punctuating words and rhyming words in these lines generate a certain kind of echo and create a bright melody, all to the effect of portraying the bright innocence of the subject of the verse.

Nụ tầm xuân (-) nở ra xanh biếc. (--)
Em đã có chồng (--) anh tiếc (-) lắm thay. (--)

Sound "iếc" in the two words "biếc" và "tiếc" rhyming here has two "up" vowels (iê) together with up tone but rather truncated by the last consonant "c", are known as "clogged sound". These sounds, when read out loud, are associated with sobbing, hiccup, the music is thus slow, and plaintive, sorrowful. Hence, "iec" is particularly excellently rhymed, to express most precisely the heart-wrenching regret of the boy returning to his old place, meeting the old friends, having deep feelings for a very beautiful girl, but the girl was already married.

Yêu ai tha thiết, thiết tha
Áo em hai vạt trải ra chàng ngồi.

Sometimes to preserve the musical quality of the folklore poem, the sounds of the compound words can have reversal of positions. Like the above folklore, the two sounds "tha thiet" are reversed to become "thiet tha", because the 6-8 form of the poem only allows for flat rhyme. Poetry or folksongs often have "láy" words, whereby due to the repetition of the whole word or an element of it, "láy" word, when pronounced, two enunciations of the two words will coincide (complete "láy") or come close (incomplete "láy") creating a series of harmony, rendering the musical quality of poetry both multi-colored and elegant.

== Poetic riddles ==
=== Riddles ===
Like Ca Dao, folk poetry riddles, or Đố were anonymously composed in ancient times and passed down as a regional heritage. Lovers in courtship often used Đố as a challenge for each other or as a smart flirt to express their inner sentiments. Peasants in the Red River and Mekong Deltas used Đố as entertainment to disrupt the humdrum routine of rice planting or after a day's toil. Đố satisfies the peasants' intellectual needs and allows them to poke fun at the pedantic court scholars, stumped by these equivocating verses.

Mặt em phương tượng chữ điền,
Da em thì trắng, áo đen mặc ngoài.
Lòng em có đất, có trời,
Có câu nhân nghĩa, có lời hiếu trung.
Dù khi quân tử có dùng,
Thì em sẽ ngỏ tấm lòng cho xem.

Translation:

My face resembles the character of "rice field"
My skin is white, but I wear a black shield
My heart (lit. bowel) harbors the earth, the sky
Words about conscience and loyalty
When you gentleman could use for me,
I will open my heart for you to see

The speaker refers to herself as "em," an affectionate, if not somewhat sexist, pronoun for a subordinate, often a female. Combined with the reference to the rice field, the verses suggest that the speaker is of a humble position, most likely a lowly peasant girl. Pale skin is a mark of beauty, hence the speaker is also implying that she is a pretty girl. She is speaking to a learned young man, a scholar, for whom she has feelings. The answer to the riddle is that the "I" is a book. In a few verses, the clever speaker coyly puts forth a metaphorical self-introduction and proposal: a peasant girl with both physical and inner beauty invites the gentleman-scholar's courtship.

=== Rhyming math puzzles ===
Yêu nhau cau sáu bổ ba,
Ghét nhau cau sáu bổ ra làm mười.
Mỗi người một miếng trăm người,
Có mười bảy quả hỏi người ghét yêu.

Translation:

In love, we'll split the nut in three;
In hate, ten parts there'll be, no more.
One piece each, we're five score.
Seventeen nuts. Count who adore, who hate.

With just four rhyming verses, the riddle sets up two linear equations with two unknowns. The answers are 30 lovers and 70 haters. The numbers might seem irrelevant to the overall context of a flirty math puzzle, but one may see the proportions as a representation of the romantic dynamics of the couple, or the speaker himself or herself: 3 part love, 7 part despair.

== See also ==
- Censorship in Vietnam
- Classical Chinese poetry forms
- Tang poetry
- Vè
- Tale of Kiều
- Chinh phụ ngâm
- Confucian scholar poets Trần Tế Xương, Nguyễn Khuyến, Bà Huyện Thanh Quan, Hồ Xuân Hương
