= List of Vietnamese historical films =

Below is the list of Vietnamese historical drama films:

== List of Vietnamese historical drama films ==
=== Films set in the Ancient Age ===
| Title | Release date | Time period | Setting | Notes |
|---|---|---|---|---|
| Sơn thần thủy quái | 1991 | Hồng Bàng Period | Văn Lang (Vietnam) | About the legend of Sơn Tinh – Thủy Tinh. |
| Truyền thuyết tình yêu Thần Nước (Legend of the Water God's love) | 1991 | Hồng Bàng Period | Văn Lang (Vietnam) | About the legend of Sơn Tinh – Thủy Tinh. |
| Thạch Sanh | 1995 | Hồng Bàng Period | Văn Lang (Vietnam) | About the story of Thạch Sanh – Lý Thông. |
| Cuộc chiến với Chằn Tinh (Fight against the Orge) | 2014 | Hồng Bàng Period | Văn Lang (Vietnam) | About the story of Thạch Sanh – Lý Thông. |

=== Films set in the Feudal Age (214 BC — 1945) ===
==== Films set in the Âu Lạc Period (214 — 111 BC) ====
| Title | Release date | Time period | Setting | Notes |
|---|---|---|---|---|
| Chuyện tình Mỵ Châu (My Chau's Love) | 1992 | 210 BC— 207 BC | Âu Lạc (Vietnam) | About the story of Princess Mỵ Châu and Prince Zhongshui. |

==== Films set in the Independence period (938 — 1945) ====
| Title | Release date | Time period | Setting | Notes |
|---|---|---|---|---|
| Lửa cháy thành Đại La | 1989 | | Đại Cồ Việt (Vietnam) | |
| Đinh Tiên hoàng đế (Emperor Dinh Tien Hoang) | 2013 | 924—968 | Đại Cồ Việt (Vietnam) | Đinh Bộ Lĩnh defeated the 12 rebellions warlords and unified the country. |
| Lý Công Uẩn: Đường tới thành Thăng Long | 2010 | 974—1009 | Đại Cồ Việt (Vietnam) | |
| Khát vọng Thăng Long (The Prince and the Pagoda Boy) | 2010 | 974—1009 | Đại Cồ Việt (Vietnam) | |
| Huyền sử thiên đô | 2011 | 999–1009 | Đại Cồ Việt (Vietnam) | |
| Về đất Thăng Long | 2010 | 1003-1009 | Đại Cồ Việt (Vietnam) | |
| Thái sư Trần Thủ Độ | 2013 | 1210 | Đại Việt (Vietnam) | About the story of Trần Thủ Độ. |
| Trần Quốc Toản ra quân | 1971 | 1282 | Đại Việt (Vietnam) | About the story of Trần Quốc Toản. |
| Học trò Thủy Thần | 1990 | after 1310 | Đại Việt (Vietnam) | About the story of Chu Văn An with his student. |
| Trùng Quang tâm sử | 2002 | after 1400 | Vietnam | |
| Tể tướng Lưu Nhân Chú | 2016 | 1416—1428 | Vietnam | |
| Minh Tâm kỳ án | 2016 | | Vietnam | |
| Blood Letter | 2013 | after 1442 | Vietnam | About the mystery of Lệ Chi Viên. |
| Huyền thoại Bà Đế | 1927 | | Đại Việt (Vietnam) | One of the fourth early produced in Vietnam. |
| Kỳ tích Bà Đen | 1989 | | Đại Việt (Vietnam) | |
| Đêm hội Long Trì | 1989 | after 1770 | Đại Việt (Vietnam) | About the story of Lady Đặng Thị Huệ and her brother Đặng Lân. |
| Kiếp phù du | 1990 | after 1781 | Đại Việt (Vietnam) | About the war between Lady Đặng Thị Huệ and Lady Dương Thị Ngọc Hoan. |
| Mỹ nhân | 2015 | | Đại Việt (Vietnam) | |
| Kim Vân Kiều | 1924 | 17 century | Da Ming (China) | The first film produced in Vietnam. Based on the story of Jin — Yun — Qiao |
| Vương Thúy Kiều | 1989 | 17 century | Da Ming (China) | Based on the story of Jin — Yun — Qiao |
| Thăng Long đệ nhất kiếm | 1989 | 18 century | Đại Việt (Vietnam) | |
| Tây Sơn hiệp khách | 1990 | 18 century | Đại Việt (Vietnam) | |
| Ngọc Trản thần công | 1990 | 18 century | Đại Việt (Vietnam) | Also known as Tây Sơn hiệp khách 2. |
| Tây Sơn hào kiệt | 2010 | 18 century | Đại Việt (Vietnam) | |
| Long thành cầm giả ca | 2010 | 18—19 century | Đại Việt (Vietnam) | |
| Hồi chuông Thiên Mụ | 1957 | 19 century | Vietnam | |
| Người đẹp Bình Dương | 1958 | 19 century | Vietnam | |
| Anh hùng Nguyễn Trung Trực | 2012 | 19 century | Vietnam | |
| Vợ Ba | 2018 | 19 century | Vietnam | |
| Hoàng Hoa Thám | 1987 | 19—20 centuries | Vietnam (French Indochine) | About the story of Hoàng Hoa Thám. |
| Bình Tây đại nguyên soái | 2013 | 19—20 centuries | Vietnam (French Indochine) | |
| Mê Thảo, thời vang bóng | 2003 | 19—20 centuries | Vietnam (French Indochine) | |
| Con nhà nghèo | 1998 | 20 century | Vietnam (French Indochine) | |
| Chúa tàu Kim Quy | 2002 | 20 century | Vietnam (French Indochine) | |
| The Rebel | 2007 | 1920s | Vietnam (French Indochine) | |
| Ngọn nến Hoàng cung (The Imperial Palace's Candles) | 2004 | after 1925 | Vietnam (French Indochine) | About the reign of Emperor Bảo Đại. |
| Lều chõng | 2010 | after 1930 | Vietnam (French Indochine) | |

=== Films set in the Modern Age (1945—) ===
| Title | Release date | Time period | Setting | Notes |
|---|---|---|---|---|
| The White Silk Dress | 2006 | 1954 | North Vietnam (Vietnam) | |
| Vĩ tuyến 17 ngày và đêm | 1972 | after 1954 | North Vietnam (Vietnam) | Life of Vietnamese living on both sides of the 17th parallel that splits Vietnam into North and South. |
| Chung một dòng sông | 1959 | after 1954 | | |
| Người tình không chân dung | 1971 | after 1955 | South Vietnam (Vietnam) | |
| The Abandoned Field: Free Fire Zone | 1979 | after 1955 | | An "unnerving and compelling .. subjective-camera-eye-view" of life under helicopter fire in the Mekong Delta. |
| Coordinates of Death | 1985 | 1960s—1970s | North Vietnam (Vietnam) | Stranded Soviet sailors witness American war brutality. |
| Dòng sông phẳng lặng | 2005 | 1960s | South Vietnam (Vietnam) | |
| Những người viết huyền thoại | 2013 | 1960s | | |
| Chân trời tím | 1971 | 1960s | | |
| Land of Sorrows | 1971 | after 1970 | South Vietnam (Vietnam) | |
| Giao thừa | 2009 | 1971 | South Vietnam (Vietnam) | |
| Girl from Hanoi | 1974 | 1972 | North Vietnam (Vietnam) | |
| Hà Nội 12 ngày đêm | 2003 | 1972 | North Vietnam (Vietnam) | |
| Mùi cỏ cháy | 2012 | 1972 | North Vietnam (Vietnam) | |
| Đừng đốt | 2009 | | North Vietnam (Vietnam) | |
| Nổi gió | 1966 | | South Vietnam (Vietnam) | |
| Cô giáo Hạnh | 1966 | | | |
| Xin nhận nơi này làm quê hương | 1970 | | | |
| Không nơi ẩn nấp | 1971 | | | |
| Trên đỉnh mùa đông | 1972 | | | |
| Bài ca ra trận | 1973 | | | |
| Mộng Thường | 1974 | | South Vietnam (Vietnam) | |
| Mối tình đầu | 1977 | | South Vietnam (Vietnam) | |
| Ngọn lửa Krông Jung | 1980 | | South Vietnam (Vietnam) | |
| Ván bài lật ngửa | 1982 | | | Biopic of the North Vietnamese spy Phạm Ngọc Thảo. |
| Bao giờ cho đến tháng Mười | 1984 | | South Vietnam (Vietnam) | |
| Biệt động Sài Gòn | 1986 | | South Vietnam (Vietnam) | |
| Lưỡi dao | 1995 | | South Vietnam (Vietnam) | |
| Trường Sơn ngày ấy | 1999 | | South Vietnam (Vietnam) | |
| Đường thư | 2005 | | | |
| Tự thú trước bình minh | 1979 | 1975 | South Vietnam (Vietnam) | |
| Giải phóng Sài Gòn | 2005 | 1975 | South Vietnam (Vietnam) | Fall of Saigon |
| Sống trong sợ hãi | 2005 | 1975 | Vietnam | |

=== Films set in unknown time ===
| Title | Release date | Time period | Setting | Notes |
|---|---|---|---|---|
| Áo dòng đẫm máu | 1960 | | Vietnam | |
| Nghêu, Sò, Ốc, Hến | 1967 | | Vietnam | |
| Thằng Bờm | 1987 | | Vietnam | |
| Phạm Công - Cúc Hoa | 1989 | | Vietnam | |
| Lá ngọc cành vàng | 1989 | | Vietnam | |
| Tấm Cám | 1991 | | Vietnam | Based on an ancient Vietnamese fairy tale of the story of two half-sisters Tấm and Cám. |
| Tình người kiếp rắn | 1991 | | | |
| Tráng sĩ Bồ Đề | 1991 | | Vietnam | |
| Dã tràng xe cát biển Đông | 1995 | | Vietnam | |
| Người con báo hiếu | 1997 | | Magadha (India) | |
| Đôi mắt Thái tử Câu Na La | 1997 | | Maurya (India) | |
| Ánh đạo vàng | 1998 | | Shakya (Nepal, India) | |
| Lục Vân Tiên | 2004 | | Vietnam | |
| Once Upon a Time in Vietnam | 2013 | | Vietnam | The first Vietnamese action fantasy film. |
| Tấm Cám: The Untold Story | 2016 | | Vietnam | |
| Trần Trung kỳ án | 2017 | | Vietnam | |

== See also ==
- list of Asian historical drama films
