= Wang Cuiqiao =

Chinese Ming Dynasty female singer

Wang Cuiqiao (王翠翘) was a courtesan during the Jiajing period of the Ming Dynasty, and a native of Zibo, Shandong. Her story appears in the literature of the Ming and Qing dynasties.

== Life ==
Wang Cuiqiao was from Linzi, Shandong, from a poor family. She was sold to Ma's family, a courtesan family. Wang Cuiqiao changed her name to Ma Qiao'er (马翘儿). She learned the skills of singing, playing the flute and pipa, and became a courtesan. Her adoptive mother brought her to Jiangnan to perform, and she was popular singing Wushe songs. She sang with clear enunciation, a crisp voice, and played musical instruments, attracting many audiences. Wang displayed a calm personality and was not interested in prostitution. She did not approach rich people who were wealthy but uneducated. Her adoptive mother often scolded and beat her for this. She used her personal savings to regain her free status. Later, she changed her name from Ma Qiao'er to Wang Cuiqiao and went to Suzhou and Hangzhou to perform. Wang and the chivalrous Anhui rich man Luo Longwen married. After they were invaded by the wokou, Luo Longwen escaped, but Wang Cuiqiao was captured. She remarried to the pirate leader Xu Hai. Wang Cuiqiao and Xu Hai wandered on the sea. She listened to Hu Zongxian and persuaded Xu Hai to surrender to Hu Zongxian. Xu Hai died in battle against the government troops. Wang Cuiqiao was escorted back by officers. In order to reward Peng Yinan for his efforts in quelling the wokou, and to save face after losing his temper after drinking, Hu Zongxian gave Wang Cuiqiao to Peng Yinan. Wang Cuiqiao was so distraught that she jumped into the Qiantang River and committed suicide.

== Literature ==
The story of Wang Cuiqiao appears in many literary works of the Ming and Qing dynasties. The sixth of Mao Kun's "Ten Songs Accompanied by Drums and Flutes by the Grand Marshall Hu Yao" (大司马胡公饶歌鼓吹曲十首), record Wang Cuiqiao's story. Around the late 16th century, Ming historian Xu Xuemo wrote the first Biography of Wang Qiao'er. Wang Shizhen wrote The Continuation of the Romance of Wang Qiao'er (续艳异编王翅儿). Wang Cuiqiao is mentioned in Mei Dingzuo's Lotus in the Mud. Wang Cuiqiao appears in Feng Menglong's Zhinang, Dai Shilin's Li Cuiqiao, Yu Huai's The Biography of Wang Cuiqiao, Zhou Qingyuan's Junior Guardian Hu's Victory in Pacifying the Wo (胡少保平倭战功), Lu Renlong's Regulator General Hu Makes clever use of Hua Diqing, Wang Cuiqiao Dies to Repay Xu Mingshan (胡总制巧用华棣卿，王翠翅死报徐明山). These writings contributed to the making of the novel Jin Yunqiao and the Vietnamese poem The Tale of Kieu, where Wang Cuiqiao is presented as a prostitute.
