= Gia huấn ca =

Chinese verse text by Nguyễn Trãi

The Gia huấn ca (chữ Hán: 家訓歌 The Family Training Ode) is a 976-line Vietnamese text traditionally ascribed to the Vietnamese Confucian scholar Nguyễn Trãi (阮廌, 1380–1442) (although most likely written by Lý Văn Phức). Written in song thất lục bát verse.

The full printed title is Lê triều Nguyễn tướng công Gia huấn ca (Familial Instructions Put in Verse by Minister Nguyen Trai of the Le Court).

The content follows traditional Chinese Confucian lines in subordination of women: "When young, obey your father; when married, your husband; and when old, your son.", and also in the filial piety of children. The book was heavily promoted by Vietnam's Nguyen dynasty, as it faced the challenges of modernization in the 19th century, and became part of the tensions underlying the independence and later revolutionary movements. However, the manual continues to illustrate some of the roots of female roles in Vietnam today.
