= Phan Huy Chú =

Phan Huy Chú (1782–1840) was a Vietnamese mandarin administrator, scholar and historian. He was a son of the scholar and official Phan Huy Ích, who had been a noted official in the short-lived Tay Son regime.

Chú was recruited to go on a mission to China in 1825, the 6th year of the reign of Minh Mệnh. In 1828 he was appointed deputy governor of Thừa Thiên Province, and then in 1829 governor of Quảng Nam Province. Thereafter he continued to serve the court as a diplomatic envoy, including on a fact-finding trip in 1833 that took him to Singapore and Batavia in the Dutch East Indies. Upon returning from the trip he submitted a report under the title "Summary Record of a Sea Journey."

He is best known as author of Lich Trieu Hien Chuong Loai Chi (1819).
