= Phan Huy Ích =

Vietnamese poet

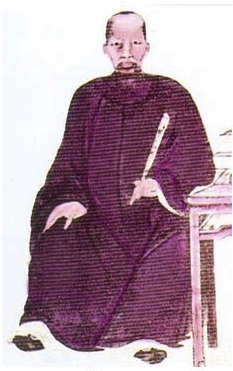
Portrait of Phan Huy Ích, painted in 1790.

Phan Huy Ích (chữ Hán: 潘輝益; 1751–1822) was a Vietnamese poet. Phan Huy Ich served two dynasties, both the Le dynasty then the Tay Son uprising. About the time of the collapse of the Tay Son dynasty he wrote the preface to Ngô Thì Nhậm's last book on Buddhism True Lam Tong Chi Nguyen Thanh. He was father of Phan Huy Chú (1782–1840) author of Lich Trieu Hien Chuong Loai Chi (1819).

Phan Huy Ích was in 1926 claimed as the true translator into Vietnamese of Đặng Trần Côn's Chinh phụ ngâm. The translation from chữ Hán into vernacular chữ Nôm had traditionally been ascribed to poet Đoàn Thị Điểm.
