= Đoàn Thị Điểm =

Vietnamese classical poet

- Born: 1705; Giai Phạm village, Văn Giang district, Kinh Bắc authority, An Nam
- Died: September 11th, 1746 or 1748; Nghệ An local government, An Nam
- Spouse: Nguyễn Kiều

Đoàn Thị Điểm (chữ Hán: 段氏點, 1705 - 1748), courtesy name Thụy Châu (瑞珠), pseudonym Mai Khuê (梅閨) or Rosy Clouds Lady (紅霞女史), was the classical-Vietnamese female poet.

== Biography ==
Đoàn Thị Điểm was born in 1705 at Giai Phạm village, Văn Giang district, Kinh Bắc local government (now Yên Mỹ District, Hưng Yên province). She is best known for her biography of the goddess Liễu Hạnh and her version of Đặng Trần Côn's poem Lament of a soldier's wife from Hán into vernacular Nôm. The Lament is an example of double seven, six eight form. She was also believed to have posthumously written Nữ Trung Tùng Phận (Duties of Women), a Caodaist moral poem targeting women, in 1933

== Family ==
- Đoàn Doãn Nghi (1678 - 1729) : Father
- Đoàn Doãn Luân (1700 - 1735) : Older brother.
- Nguyễn Kiều (1695 - 1752) : Husband (m. 1742-1748, her death).

== See also ==
- Cai Yan
- Shin Saimdang
- Heo Chohui
