= Lục bát =

Traditional Vietnamese poetic form

Lục bát (Vietnamese: [lʊwk͡p̚˧˨ʔ ʔɓaːt̚˧˦], chữ Hán: 六八) is a traditional Vietnamese verse form – historically first recorded in Chữ Nôm script. "Lục bát" is Sino-Vietnamese for "six-eight", referring to the alternating lines of six and eight syllables. It will always begin with a six-syllable line and end with an eight-syllable one. A related measure is the Song thất lục bát.

Unlike other verse forms which are traditionally enjoyed only by high-class Vietnamese, lục bát is traditionally composed and enjoyed by people of all classes, from the lowly peasants to the noble princes. It can be regarded as a living style of Vietnamese people. The rich treasure of Vietnamese folk poems (ca dao), which consists of hundred thousands of verses that reflect on life, morality, human relationships, and natural beauty, is almost entirely composed in lục bát form. The 3,774 verses in "Đại Nam Quốc Sử Diễn Ca" (chữ Hán: 大南國史演歌; Epic Song of National History) composed by Vietnamese poet Lê Ngô Cát under the reign of Emperor Tự Đức are also entirely in the form of lục bát. Poet Nguyễn Du of the Lê dynasty also composed 3,254 lục bát verses, telling the story of an unfortunate beauty in his renowned epic Truyện Kiều (The Tale of Kiều).

== Tone rule ==
Tones are among the most important elements in Lục Bát as well as the other Vietnamese verse forms.

In poetry, the six tones of Vietnamese language are divided based on their falling and rising nature into two categories: bằng (flat) and trắc (sharp or non-flat).

- Bằng category comprises two tones: ngang and huyền.
- Trắc category comprises four tones: sắc, hỏi, ngã, nặng.

There is more than one way to categorize Vietnamese tones and this categorization is only used in poetry. Also, though tone huyền is classified in the bằng category, it is actually a low falling tone.

The tones of the syllables in lục bát verses should follow the following model:

- Bằng bằng trắc trắc bằng bằng
- Bằng bằng trắc trắc bằng bằng trắc bằng.

However, the odd syllables in lục bát verses do not have to follow the rule, but the even syllables must follow the rule.

There are two exceptions to the above tone rule in lục bát poems:

- The first exception is when there is a pause after the third syllable in the lục line (six-syllable line). When this happens, the second syllable of the lục line can have a trắc tone.
- The second exception involves the rhyme rule and will be discussed in the following section.

== Rhyme rule ==
There are two kinds of rhymes in Vietnamese poetry. The first one is called vần giàu (rich rhymes) and the second one is called vần nghèo (poor rhymes).

- Vần giàu (rich rhymes): when two words have the same final sound and their tones come from the same category. Examples:
  - xanh and cành are rich bằng rhymes (vần bằng giàu).
  - quyển and chuyến are rich trắc rhymes (vần trắc giàu).
- Vần nghèo (poor rhymes): when two words have nearly similar final sound and their tones come from the same category. Examples:
  - thêu and trèo are poor bằng rhymes (vần bằng nghèo).
  - kính and cảnh are poor trắc rhymes (vần trắc nghèo).

There are two types of rhyme schemes for lục bát poems.

- The first type is the more common and popular one. In this rhyme scheme, the sixth syllable of the six-syllable line rhymes with the sixth syllable of the eight-syllable line, then the eighth syllable of the eight-syllable line rhymes with the sixth syllable of next six-syllable line, and the pattern goes on. This rhyme scheme can be summarized in the following model:

•	♭	•	♯	•	♭A
•	♭	•	♯	•	♭A	•	♭B
•	♭	•	♯	•	♭B
•	♭	•	♯	•	♭B	•	♭C
•	♭	•	♯	•	♭C
•	♭	•	♯	•	♭C	•	♭D

• = any syllable; ♯ = trắc (sharp) syllable; ♭ = bằng (flat) syllable; ♭A = bằng (flat) syllable with "A" rhyme.
♯ and ♭ are used only as handy mnemonic symbols; no connection with music should be inferred.

- The second type is the less common one which involves a break of the tone rule. In this type, the sixth syllable of the six-syllable line rhymes with the fourth syllable of the eight-syllable line instead. With this rhyme scheme, the fourth syllable of the eight-syllable line will be switched to bằng tone, while the second and sixth syllables of the eight-syllable line will be switched to trắc tone.

•	♭	•	♯	•	♭A
•	♯	•	♭A	•	♯	•	♭B
•	♭	•	♯	•	♭B
•	♯	•	♭B	•	♯	•	♭C
•	♭	•	♯	•	♭C
•	♯	•	♭C	•	♯	•	♭D

== Example ==
A formal paraphrase of the first six lines of The Tale of Kiều suggests the effect of syllable count, iambic tendency, and interlocking rhyme (English has no analogue for tone):

Trăm năm trong cõi người ta,
Chữ tài chữ mệnh khéo là ghét nhau.
Trải qua một cuộc bể dâu,
Những điều trông thấy mà đau đớn lòng.
Lạ gì bỉ sắc tư phong,
Trời xanh quen thói má hồng đánh ghen.

— Nguyễn Du: Truyện Kiều, lines 1-6.
Translation:

A century of life
Sees genius aye in strife with doom:
As hills for vales make room
These visions dire consume the soul.
Surprised by joy with dole?
Once-rosy cheek, heav'n's toll is paid.
