= Jin Yun Qiao =

Pseudonymous 17th-century Chinese novel

Jin Yun Qiao or Chin Yun Ch'iao (金雲翹 or 金雲翹傳, The Tale of Jin, Yun and Qiao or The Tale of Chin, Yun, and Ch'iao) is a seventeenth-century Chinese novel by an unknown writer under the pseudonym Qingxin Cairen (青心才人, Pure Heart Talented Man). The literary Chinese tale is widely popular in Vietnam where it was known as "Kim Vân Kiều," and then became the original source on which the vernacular Vietnamese epic poem The Tale of Kieu is based.
