= Đặng Trần Côn =

Vietnamese author

- 鄧陳琨
- Born: circa 1705; Nhân Mục village, Thanh Trì district, Hanoi
- Died: circa 1745 (aged 39–40); Vietnam
- Citizenship: Vietnamese
- Notable work: Chinh phụ ngâm

Đặng Trần Côn (chữ Hán: 鄧陳琨; born Trần Côn; c. 1705–1745) was the author of the Chinh phụ ngâm, a masterpiece of chữ Hán literature of Vietnam.

Đặng Trần Côn was born in Nhân Mục village (or Nhân Mọc), Thanh Trì district, (now Nhân Chính ward, Thanh Xuân district), Hanoi, around 1705–1710. As an adopted child his surname Đặng was that of his adoptive family. His original name was Trần Côn. His work Chinh phụ ngâm was written in chữ Hán was later translated into chữ Nôm by the poet Đoàn Thị Điểm and the poet Phan Huy Ích (1751–1822).

According to tradition Dang Tran Con was an ardent scholar, who being deprived of light for his studies as a result of the edict, dug a subterranean room where he could study by candlelight. He initially approached the poet Đoàn Thị Điểm but was rebuffed with his initial work. Later she was impressed by and translated his Lament of the Soldier's Wife.
