= The Tale of Kieu =

Vietnamese epic poem

The Tale of Kiều
- Truyện Kiều
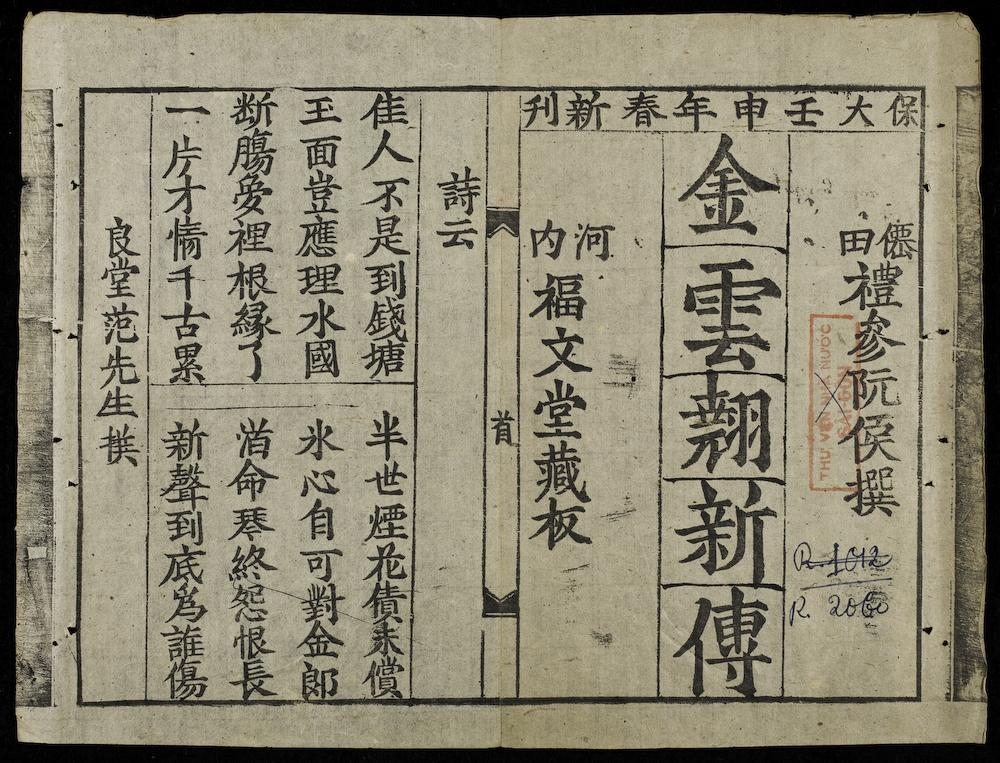
- A 1932 copy of Kim Vân Kiều tân truyện published in Hanoi, is better known as Truyện Kiều (Tale of Kiều).
- Original title: Vietnamese: Đoạn Trường Tân Thanh; Chữ Hán: 斷腸新聲
- Also known as: Vietnamese: Truyện Kiều; Chữ Hán: 傳翹
- Author(s): Nguyễn Du
- Language: Vietnamese (written in Chữ Nôm)
- Date of issue: 1820
- Authenticity: remake
- Genre: epic poem
- Verse form: lục bát (6/8)
- Length: 3,254 verses
- Personages: Thúy Kiều
- Sources: Jin Yun Qiao

The Tale of Kiều is an epic poem in Vietnamese written by Nguyễn Du (1765–1820), well known in Vietnamese literature. The original title in Vietnamese is Đoạn Trường Tân Thanh (斷腸新聲, "A New Cry From a Broken Heart"), but it is better known as Truyện Kiều (傳翹, IPA: [t͡ɕwiən˧˨ʔ kiəw˨˩], lit. "Tale of Kiều").

In 3,254 verses, written in lục bát ("six–eight") meter, the poem recounts the life, trials and tribulations of Thúy Kiều, a beautiful and talented young woman, who has to sacrifice herself to save her family. To save her father and younger brother from prison, she sells herself into marriage with a middle-aged man, not knowing that he is a pimp, and is forced into prostitution. While modern interpretations vary, some post-colonial writers have interpreted it as a critical, allegorical reflection on the rise of the Nguyễn dynasty.

The work is famous for its humane meaning and was translated into 20 languages, such as English, French, Japanese, and Korean.

== Background ==
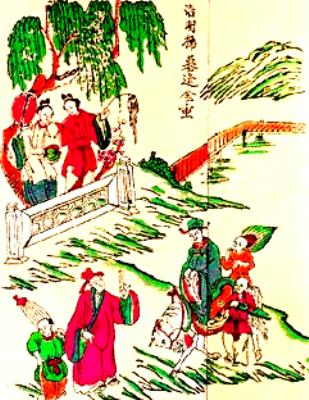
Illustration of Thúy Kiều meeting Kim Trọng (19th century painting)

1894 Royal Manuscript of "Truyện Kiều".

Nguyễn Du made use of the plot of a seventeenth-century Chinese novel, Jīn Yún Qiào (Chinese: 金雲翹), known in Vietnamese pronunciation of Chinese characters as Kim Vân Kiều. The original, written by an unknown writer under the pseudonym Qīngxīn Cáirén (Chinese: 青心才人 "Pure-Hearted Man of Talent"), was a straightforward romance, but Nguyễn Du chose it to convey the social and political upheavals at the end of the 18th century in Vietnam.

Vietnam at that time was ruled nominally by the 300-year-old Lê dynasty, but real power rested in the Trịnh lords in the north and the Nguyễn lords in the south. While the Trịnh and the Nguyễn were fighting against each other, the Tây Sơn rebels overthrew both the Nguyễn and then the Trịnh over the span of a decade. Nguyễn Du was loyal to the Lê Dynasty and hoped for the return of the Lê emperor. In 1802 the Nguyễn lord Nguyễn Ánh conquered all of Vietnam forming the new Nguyễn dynasty. Nguyễn Ánh, now Emperor Gia Long, summoned Nguyễn Du to join the new government and, with some reluctance, he did so. Nguyễn Du's situation in terms of conflicting loyalties between the previous Lê king and the current Nguyễn emperor is partially analogous to the situation of the main character in The Tale of Kiều who submitted to circumstances but her heart longed for her first love.

=== Depiction of sex work ===
It is believed that The Tale of Kiều contains the earliest depiction or mention of sex work in Vietnam. The poem depicts a form of sex work that resembles Chinese courtesan culture. Although the poem is fictional, it reveals a view of sex work in 19th century Vietnam as a kind of performative and affective, not simply sexual, labor.

== Plot ==
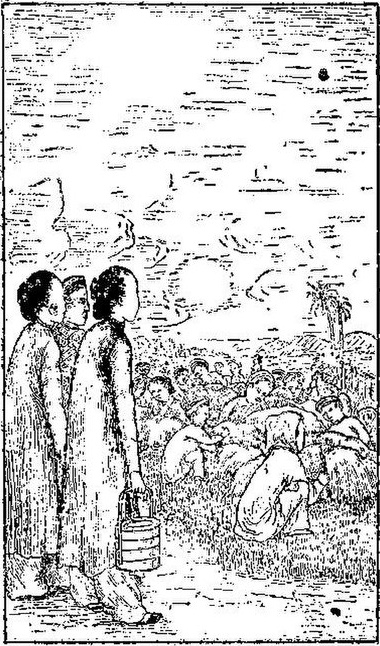
Painting depicting scenes of Thúy Kiều and Thúy Vân in Tết Thanh Minh (Qingming Festival)

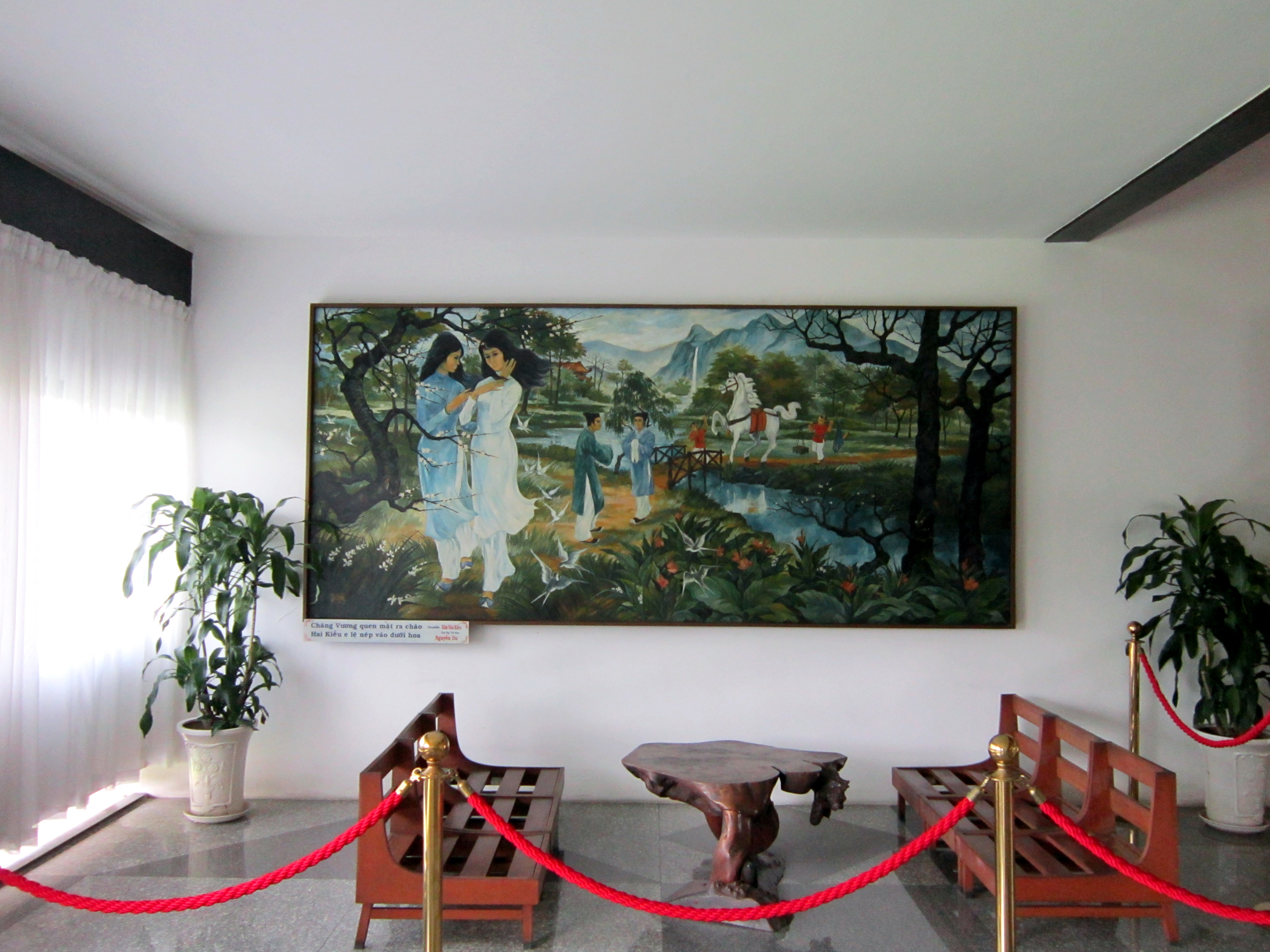
A painting depicting a scene from The Tale of Kieu at the Independence Palace

The story takes place during the reign of the Jiajing Emperor in Ming China. The entire plot in the Tale of Kiều spans over fifteen years. At the beginning of the story, set in Peking, Vương Thuý Kiều—a beautiful and educated girl—visits her ancestors' graves with her younger sister Thuý Vân (王翠雲) and brother Vương Quan (王觀). On the way, she identifies with the grave of a dead performer—Đạm Tiên (淡仙), who was said to be as beautiful and talented as she is but lived a life full of grief. There, she meets and later promises to marry Kim Trọng (金重), a young and promising scholar, but their marriage is delayed because Trọng has to go back home to mourn his uncle for half a year.

During that time misfortune begins to befall Kiều. Her family is framed by a silk dealer and has all their wealth taken away by the government: her father and brother are facing imprisonment. Kiều decides to sell herself to Scholar Mã (Mã giám sinh; 馬監生) to free her family, while asking Thúy Vân to fulfil the marital promise with Trọng. Mã turns out to be a pimp who is in charge of finding girls for a brothel run by Madam Tú (Tú Bà; 秀婆). He rapes Kiều and takes her back to the brothel in Lin-Tzu (modern day Xindian in Shandong), but she refuses to serve any guests and attempts to commit suicide when she is forced to do so. Madam Tú concocts a plan to crush Kiều's dignity by hiring Sở Khanh, a playboy and con artist, to meet Kiều and coerce her into eloping with him, and then lead her to Tú. With nothing left to hold on to, Kiều finally submits and becomes a prostitute. Kiều's beauty attracts many men, including Student Thúc (Thúc Sinh; 束生), who uses his wealth to buy Kiều out of the brothel and marry her, although he already has a wife named Lady Hoạn (Hoạn Thư; 宦姐), who is the daughter of prime minister Hoạn. Upon learning of this, Hoạn burns up with jealousy and secretly tells her henchmen to kidnap and force Kiều to become a slave in her house when Thúc is on the way to visit her. Thúc is shocked at the sight of Kiều as a slave, but never dares to reach out to her in front of his first wife.

Kiều runs away from the estate, stealing some valuable decorations on the altar in the process. She goes to a Buddhist temple, where nun Giác Duyên (覺緣) graciously accepts her. However, after realizing that Kiều is carrying stolen property, Giác Duyên sends Kiều to Madam Bạc's (Tú Bạc; 薄婆), whom Giác Duyên thinks Kiều will be safe with. However, it turns out that Madam Bạc runs a brothel, so Kiều gets tricked into the brothel again where she meets Từ Hải, leader of a revolutionany army. Từ Hải and Kiều get married and live together for five years, together reigning over a temporary kingdom. Later tricked by Hồ Tôn Hiến, Kiều convinces her husband to surrender all in favor of amnesty. This eventually leads to the invasion of Từ Hải's kingdom, and the death of Từ Hải himself. Mesmerized by Kiều's beauty, Hồ Tôn Hiến forces her to perform in his victory banquet, where he falls in love with her. To avoid bad rumors, he hurriedly marries Kiều off to a local official. Feeling devastated, she throws herself into the Qiantang River. Once again, Giác Duyên saves her, as she knew about Kiều's fate when she consulted with Tam Hợp, who is believed to be able to see into the future, long ago. Meanwhile, Kim Trọng, Kiều's first love, becomes an official and provides housing for Kiều's parents. He has been searching for Kiều, and eventually finds her with the Buddhist nun Giác Duyên. Kiều is reunited with her first love and her family, thus ending her cycle of bad karma. She is married to Kim Trọng, but refuses to have a physical relationship with him, finally honoring all her vows of young age.

== English translations ==
There have been at least five English translations of the work in the last half century. Kim Van Kieu by Lê Xuân Thuy, presenting the work in the form of a novelette, was widely available in Vietnam in the 1960s. The Tale of Kiều, a scholarly annotated blank verse version by Huỳnh Sanh Thông (1926–2008), was first published in the US in 1983. In 2008, a translation by Arno Abbey, based on the French translation by Nguyễn Khắc Viện (1913–1997), was published in the US.

There have also been two verse translations in recent years. One of these, another bilingual edition called simply Kiều published by Thế Giới Publishers, Hanoi, in 1994, with a verse translation by Michael Counsell (born 1935), is currently the English version most widely available in Vietnam itself, and the English version alone, called Kieu, The Tale of a Beautiful and Talented Girl, by Nguyễn Du, is now available worldwide. A second verse translation, The Kim Vân Kiều of Nguyễn Du (1765–1820), by Vladislav Zhukov (born 1941), was published by Pandanus books in 2004. (Note: Zhukov's patronymic is sometimes incorrectly given as 'Borisovich'. His full and correct name is Vladislav Vitalyevich Zhukov.)

A new translation by Timothy Allen of the opening section of the poem was awarded one of The Times Stephen Spender prizes for Poetry Translation in 2008; further extracts from Allen's translation have appeared in Cosmopolis, (the Summer 2009 edition of Poetry Review.) and in Transplants, the Spring 2010 edition of Modern Poetry in Translation. Allen's translation was published in its entirety in 2019 as The Song of Kieu.

An English translation by Dương Tường, which took more than two years, was published in 2020 by Nhã Nam. In 2021, a translation by twenty-year-old Nguyễn Bình from the Vietnamese into heroic couplets was published by the Vietnamese Writers' Association Publishing House. A student pursuing an astronomy degree in the United States, Bình cited homesickness as a motivation for the translation and cited being influenced by English translations of Greco-Roman epics by Alexander Pope and John Dryden. In January 2022, the translation won first prize in the Young Authors' Award of the Vietnamese Writers' Association in the Translation category.

== Comparison with Jin Yun Qiao ==
The Tale of Kiều adapted the Chinese novel Jin Yun Qiao into Vietnamese lục bát verses. Thus, there has been many works that compare the two in both Vietnamese and Chinese. The first person to do the work is Đào Duy Anh, who wrote in his book: "Nguyễn Du preserved the Chinese story without cutting or adding anything. But the original is redundant, detailed, presented in a simple way, while Nguyễn Du calculated and rearranged [the story] to be more organized and coherent." Researcher Phạm Đan Quế said: "...Nguyễn Du's story, characters, order of events, morality, philosophy and even details are mostly from the original by Qingxin-caizi. However, he selected main events and cut redundant parts, and sometime summarized long paragraphs into a few sentences. The main different is that: the events in Jin Yun Qiao are analytical, while [the events] in Tale of Kiều are organic [...] Through comparisons, we can see that Nguyễn Du preserved the order of events from the original story. However he cut the entirety of chapter 5 and 6, and instead scatter them between previous chapters. It's worth noting that Nguyễn Du told chapter 20, which is about the reunion with Kim Trọng, in 526 sentences, equal to 1/6 of the work." However Nguyễn Hữu Sơn noted that what Đào and Phạm believed to be "redundant" in Jin Yun Qiao is actually its strong point, as prose requires different storytelling technique from rhymed poetry. He also believes that the Tale of Kiều is more emotional than the original.

== Text comparisons ==
The original text was written in Vietnamese using the vernacular chữ Nôm script. Below are the first six lines of the prologue written in modern Vietnamese alphabet and several translations into English.

=== Original text ===
Recitation of the first six lines of The Tale of Kieu

The first six lines of the prologue.

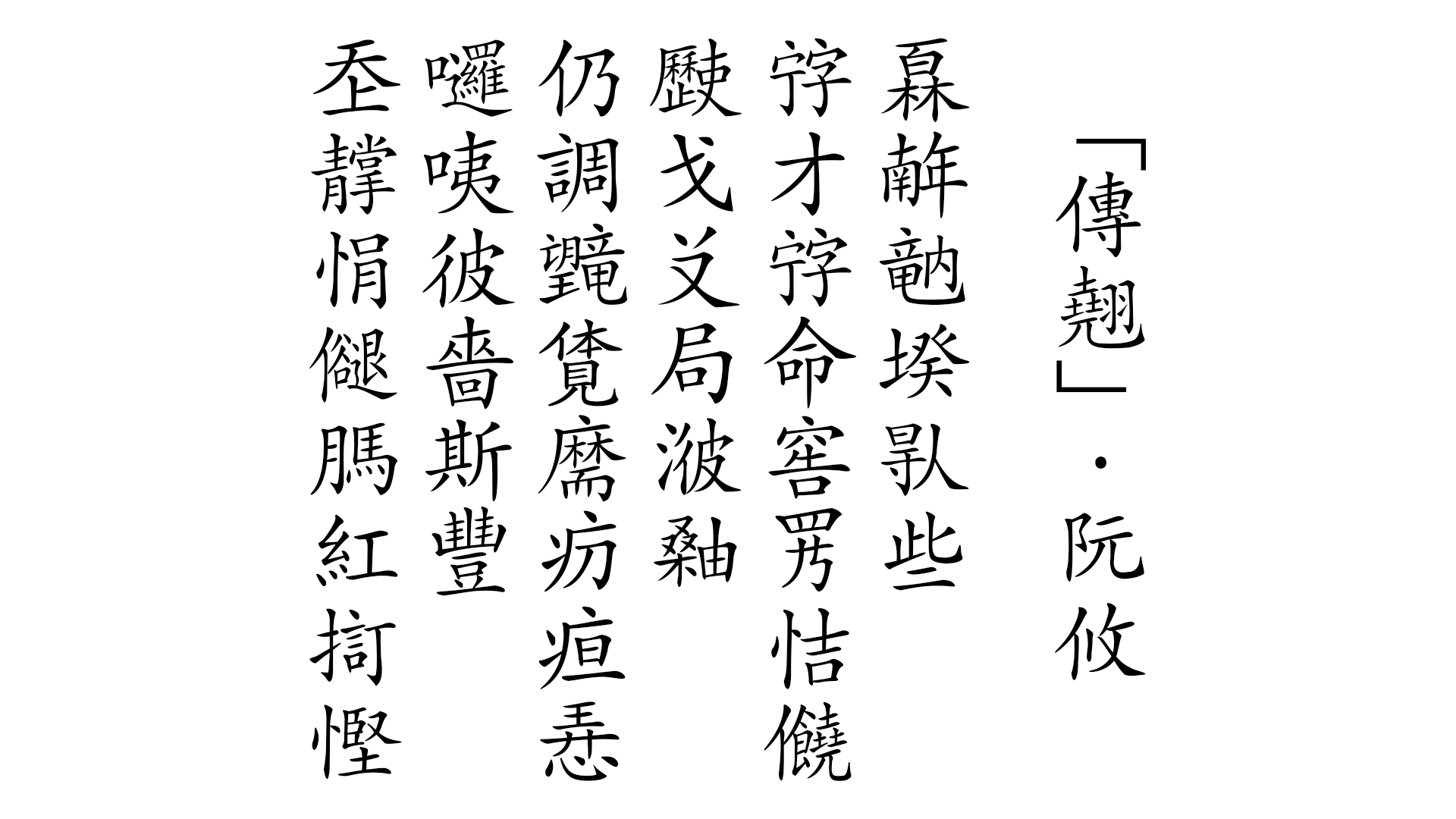

𤾓 𢆥 𥪞 𡎝 𠊛 些，
Trăm năm trong cõi người ta,
A hundred years in the realm of humanity,

𡨸 才 𡨸 命 窖 𱺵 恄 𠑬。
Chữ tài chữ mệnh khéo là ghét nhau.
Talent and destiny resent each other.

𣦰 戈 𠬠 局 𣷭 𪳫，
Trải qua một cuộc bể dâu,
The sea turning into the mulberry fields,

仍 調 𪱯 𧡊 𦓡 𤴬 疸 𢚸。
Những điều trông thấy mà đau đớn lòng.
All of these deeds seen, brings pain to your heart.

𡆗 咦 彼 嗇 斯 豐，
Lạ gì bỉ sắc tư phong,
It's not strange that we cannot have it both ways,

𡗶 𩇢 悁 𠑉 𦟐 紅 𢱏 慳。
Trời xanh quen thói má hồng đánh ghen.
Being jealous of the beauty is the blue sky's habit.

=== English translations ===
From Lê Xuân Thuy's Kim Vân Kiều:

Within the span of hundred years of human existence,
what a bitter struggle is waged between genius and destiny!
How many harrowing events have occurred while mulberries cover the conquered sea!
Rich in beauty, unlucky in life!
Strange indeed, but little wonder,
since casting hatred upon rosy cheeks is a habit of the Blue Sky.

Blank verse translation by Huỳnh Sanh Thông (1983):

A hundred years—in this life span on earth,
talent and destiny are apt to feud.
You must go through a play of ebb and flow
and watch such things as make you sick at heart.
Is it so strange that losses balance gains?
Blue Heaven's wont to strike a rose from spite.

English translation by Michael Counsell (1994):

What tragedies take place
within each circling space of years!
'Rich in good looks' appears
to mean poor luck and tears of woe;
which may sound strange, I know,
but is not really so, I swear,
since Heaven everywhere
seems jealous of the fair of face.

English translation by Vladislav Zhukov (2004):

Were full five-score the years allotted to born man,
How oft his qualities might yield within that span to fate forlorn!
In time the mulberry reclaims the sunk sea-bourn,
And what the gliding eye may first find fair weighs mournful on the heart.
Uncanny? Nay—lack ever proved glut's counterpart,
And mindful are the gods on rosy cheeks to dart celestial spite...

English translation by Phan Huy MPH (2010):

In the hundred-year span of a human life,
Talent and fate are always apt to strife.
Through experience of a harrowing change,
What we witnessed filled our hearts with tearing pain.
‘Tis not a wonder that Heaven gives then takes,
And with the fair sex He used to be jealous.

English translation by Timothy Allen (2019):

It's an old story: good luck and good looks
don't always mix.
Tragedy is circular and infinite.
The plain never believe it,
but good-looking people meet with hard times too.

It's true.
Our ending is inevitable:
long years betray the beautiful.

Heroic couplet translation by Nguyễn Bình (2021):

A hundred years alive in Man's demesne,
'Tween Fate and Talent hatred seems to reign.
Of oceans changed to various berry plains,
The sight imbues the heart with cruel pains.
It is not strange that no one's rich in all,
That rosy cheeks cause envious Heav'n to brawl.

English translation by Vuong Thanh (2022):

Within a hundred-year lifespan in this earthly world,
Genius and Destiny have a tendency to oppose each other.
A turbulent mulberry-field-covered-by-sea period had passed.
The things that we saw still deeply pain our hearts.
It’s not strange that beauty may beget misery.
The jealous gods tend to heap spites on rosy-cheeked beauties.

== Artistic adaptations ==
Recitation of a portion of the poem from a 1931 recording.

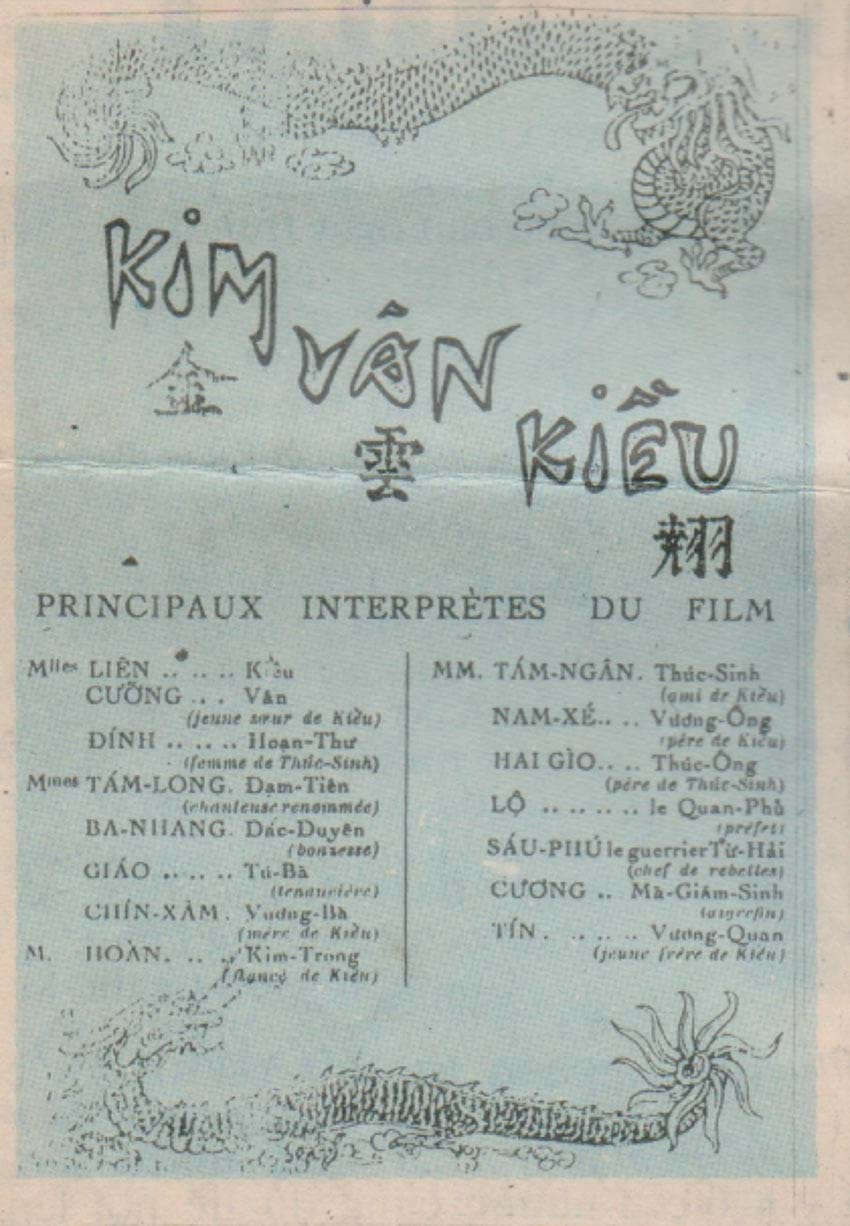
A pamphlet for the 1924 film Kim Vân Kiều (金雲翹).

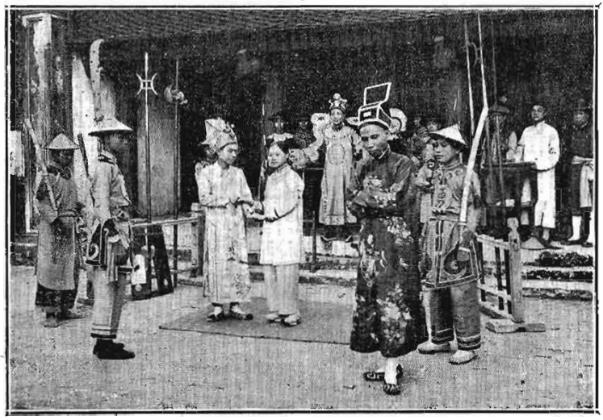
A scene from the film Kim Vân Kiều (金雲翹) in 1924.

As an integral part of Vietnamese literature for 200 years, The Tale of Kiều had been the inspiration for numerous works. The poem had been adapted into numerous other art forms, including cải lương, chèo, pantomime and Western-style operas.

The first theatrical film created in Vietnam, in 1924, was Kim Vân Kiều. The film followed closely the plot of the poem. The 30 or so actors in the film were traditional opera performers, and so the film was not a critical or commercial success.

The musician Phạm Duy adapted The Tale of Kiều into an epic song cycle entitled Minh họa Kiều ("Illustrating Kieu") in 1997.

The Tale of Kieu was the inspiration for the 2007 movie Saigon Eclipse, which moved the storyline into a modern Vietnamese setting with a modern-day immigrant Kiều working in the massage parlor industry in San Francisco's Mission District to support her family back in Vietnam. Additionally, Burton Wolfe directed a musical adaptation which premiered September 10, 2010 in Houston.

Trịnh Thăng Bình's 2020 music video entitled Bức bình phong ("Folding screen") is set in a researcher of ancient works living in modern times, while reading The Tale of Kiều, happened to be lost in Wang Cuiqiao's timeline.

A film released in April 2021, entitled Kiều, generated controversies when it released its first teaser clip in September 2020. At issue was the use of the modern Latin-based Vietnamese alphabet in signage in a film based on a poem written in chữ Nôm and set in Ming China. Near the official premiere date, the film has been evaluated as a disaster, "ruined" The Tale of Kieu. The film performed poorly at the box office, grossing only VND 2,696,659,000 (USD 107,444) and later turned into a web film.
