= Song thất lục bát =

Traditional Vietnamese poetic form

Song thất lục bát (雙七六八, literally "double seven, six eight") is a Vietnamese poetic form, which consists of a quatrain comprising a couplet of two seven-syllable lines followed by a Lục bát couplet (a six-syllable line and an eight-syllable line). Each line requires certain syllables to exhibit a "flat" or "sharp" pitch. Lines and stanzas are linked in a complex rhyme scheme.

•	•	♯	•	♭	•	♯ A
•	•	♭	•	♯ A	•	♭B
	•	♭	•	♯	•	♭B
	•	♭	•	♯	•	♭B	•	♭C
•	•	♯	•	♭C	•	♯ D
•	•	♭	•	♯ D	•	♭E
	•	♭	•	♯	•	♭E
	•	♭	•	♯	•	♭E	•	♭F

• = any syllable; ♯ = trắc (sharp) syllable; ♭ = bằng (flat) syllable; ♭A = bằng (flat) syllable with "A" rhyme.
♯ and ♭ are used only as handy mnemonic symbols; no connection with music should be inferred.

Examples in Vietnamese include:

- Chinh phụ ngâm (The Complaint of the Warrior's Wife ) by Đặng Trần Côn
- Cung oán ngâm khúc (Sadness of the Palace ) by Nguyễn Gia Thiều

Although the Song Thất Lục Bát stanza is the most common way of incorporating the secondary song thất form into the primary lục bát form, two other methods have also been used: song thất couplets may be randomly interspersed within a long lục bát poem; and the two types may alternate in an odd number of couplets, in which case the series both begins and ends with a lục bát couplet.
