= Cung oán ngâm khúc =

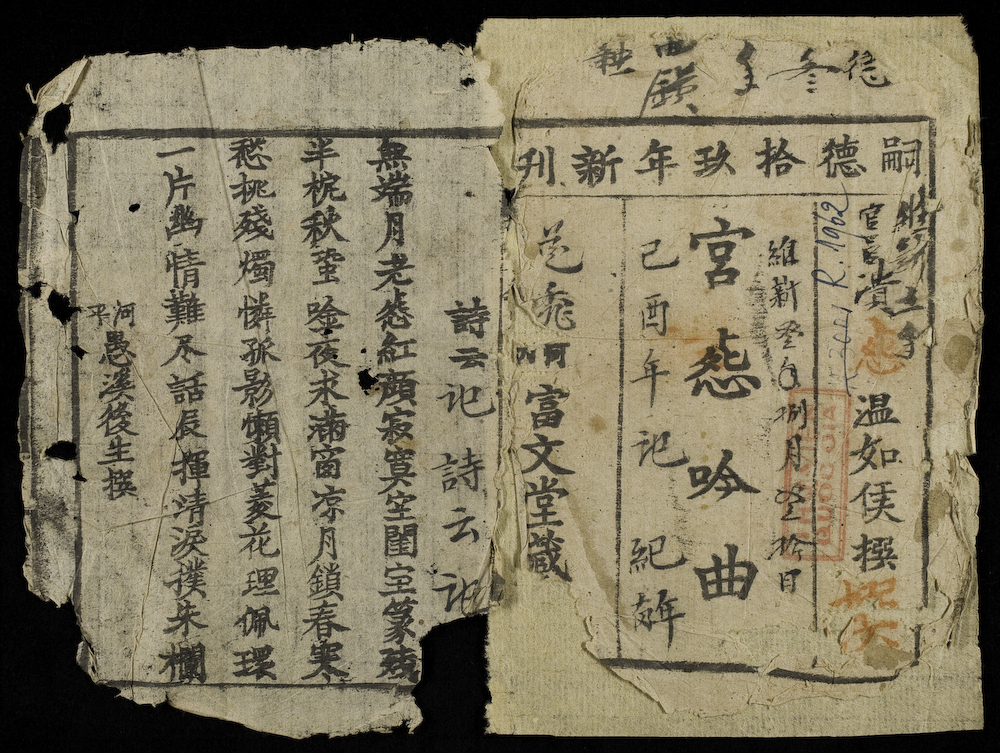
First page of Cung oán ngâm khúc

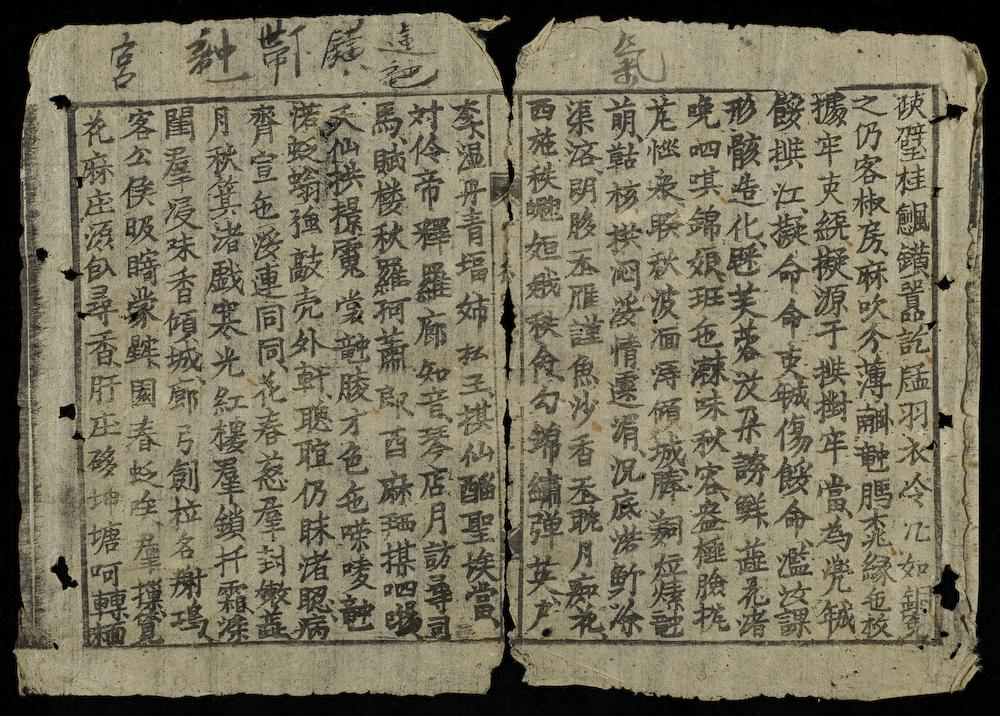
Second page of Cung oán ngâm khúc (1866)

Cung oán ngâm khúc (chữ Hán: 宮怨吟曲 Complaint of a Palace Maid) is a Vietnamese poem by Nguyễn Gia Thiều (1741–98) originally composed in nôm script.

The English title has also been rendered as the "Lament of a Royal Concubine" or "The Complaints of the Royal Harem." The poem is an example of song thất lục bát ("double seven, six eight") form of poetry in the ngâm "lament" style.

== Text ==
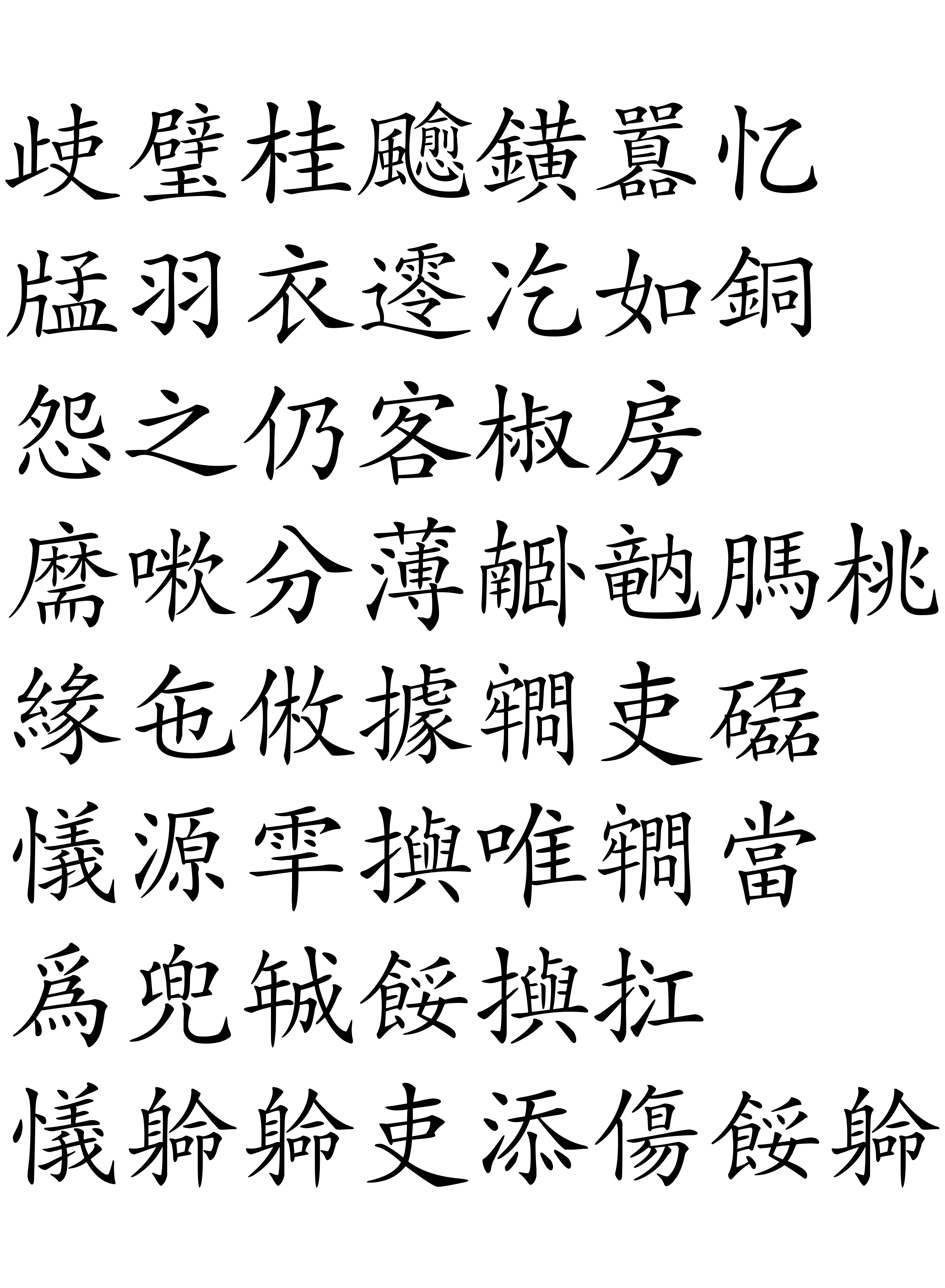

This is the first eight lines of the poem
Vietnamese Chữ Nôm (chữ Nôm, 𡨸喃)	Vietnamese alphabet (chữ Quốc Ngữ, 𡨸國語)
𣥱璧桂𩙍鐄囂忆	Trải vách quế gió vàng hiu hắt
𤗖羽衣𨗺𠖯如銅	Mảnh vũ y lạnh ngắt như đồng
怨之仍客椒房	Oán chi những khách tiêu phòng
𦓡𠺼分薄𦣰𥪞𦟐桃	Mà xui phận bạc nằm trong má đào
緣㐌𪝅據𡫡𫣚𥗐	Duyên đã may cớ sao lại rủi
𢣂源𩂀𢷣唯𡫡當	Nghĩ nguồn cơn dở dói sao đang
爲兜𢧚餒𢷣𢬥	Vì đâu nên nỗi dở dang
𢣂𨉟𨉟𫣚𬁮傷餒𨉟	Nghĩ mình, mình lại thêm thương nỗi mình
