= Nguyễn Gia Thiều =

Vietnamese poet

Nguyễn Gia Thiều (chữ Hán: 阮嘉韶, 1741–1798), courtesy name Quang Thanh (光聲), pen name Đạm Trai (澹齋), formal title Ôn Như hầu (溫如侯), was a Vietnamese poet in the 18th century. He was the grandson of Trinh Cuong, who feigned madness when Nguyen Hue expelled the Trinh from Ke Cho (modern day Hanoi).

== Biography ==
His best known work, the "Lament of a Royal Concubine" or "The Complaints of the Royal Harem" (Cung Oán Ngâm Khúc), is an example of song thất lục bát ("double seven, six eight") form of nôm poetry in the ngâm "lament" style.
