= Chinh phụ ngâm =

Poem by Đặng Trần Côn

The Chinh phụ ngâm ("Lament of the soldier's wife", 征婦吟) is a poem in Classical Chinese written by the Vietnamese author Đặng Trần Côn (1710–1745). It is also called the Chinh phụ ngâm khúc (征婦吟曲), with the additional -khúc ("tune", 曲) emphasizing that it can be performed as a musical piece not just read as a plain "lament" (ngâm, 吟).

The Chinese-language poem was translated into vernacular chữ Nôm by several translators including Phan Huy Ích and Đoàn Thị Điểm. It was also translated into Japanese, English, French and Korean languages. The first eight lines of the poem along with the music composed by Professor Võ Văn Lúa were adopted as the national anthem of the Autonomous Republic of Cochinchina from 1946 to 1949.

Classical Chinese + Sino-Vietnamese	Vietnamese (Nôm + alphabet)
天 地 風 塵 Thiên địa phong trần	𣋾 𡗶 𡐙 浽 𩂀 𩙋 𡏧 Thuở trời đất nổi cơn gió bụi
紅 顏 多 屯 Hồng nhan đa truân	客 𦟐 紅 𡗉 餒 迍 邅 Khách má hồng nhiều nỗi truân chuyên
悠 悠 彼 蒼 兮 誰 造 因 Du du bỉ thương hề thuỳ tạo nhân	撑 箕 深 瀋 層 𨕭 Xanh kia thăm thẳm tầng trên
	為 埃 𨠳 𥩯 朱 𢧚 餒 尼 Vì ai gây dựng cho nên nỗi này
鼓 鼙 聲 動 長 城 月 Cổ bề thanh động Trường Thành nguyệt	𪔠 長 城 𢲣 𢯦 𩃳 月 Trống Trường Thành lung lay bóng nguyệt
烽 火 影 照 甘 泉 雲 Phong hỏa ảnh chiếu Cam Tuyền vân	𤌋 甘 泉 𥊚 𣋻 式 𩄲 Khói Cam Tuyền mờ mịt thức mây
九 重 按 劍 起 當 席 Cửu trùng án kiếm khởi đương tịch	𠃩 層 鎌 寶 搔 𢬣 Chín tầng gươm báu trao tay
半 夜 飛 檄 傳 將 軍 Bán dạ phi hịch truyền tướng quân	𡛤 𣎀 傳 檄 定 𣈗 出 征 Nửa đêm truyền hịch định ngày xuất chinh
清 平 三 百 年 天 下 Thanh bình tam bách niên thiên hạ	渃 清 平 𠀧 𤾓 𢆥 𡳵 Nước thanh bình ba trăm năm cũ
