= Mao Amin =

Chinese singer

- 毛阿敏
- Born: 1962 (age 63–64); Shanghai
- Occupation: Singer
- Spouse: Xie Zhikun (m. 2003; died 2021)

Mao Amin (Chinese: 毛阿敏; pinyin: Máo Āmǐn; born 1962) is a Chinese singer. Rising to fame in the late 1980s, she is one of China's earliest and most prominent pop singers after the Mao era, known for her rich, powerful, and dignified voice, which has made her a staple of televised galas.

== Biography ==
Mao was born into a worker's family in Shanghai. She developed a love for music during her childhood, influenced by her mother's fondness for the Taiwanese singer Teresa Teng, whose songs were officially banned but privately popular in China at the time. After graduating from middle school in 1983, she became an electrician at her father's factory, while pursuing her music dream by part-time singing. In 1985, her performance in Shanghai caught the attention of Hou Yaowen, who came to backstage and encouraged her to pursue a professional career. Inspired, she auditioned and joined the Nanjing Military Region's Frontline Song and Dance Troupe that same year and released her debut album, Boiling Hot Coffee.

In 1986, Mao represented Jiangsu Television in the 2nd CCTV National Young Singers' Contest, winning the third prize in the category of professional pop singers and drew the attention of the judge Gu Jianfen, who became her mentor and began writing songs for her, including A Leaf's Devotion to Its Root and Mom in the Candlelight. In December 1987, at the recommendation of Gu, Mao participated in the Yugoslavian International Music Festival. With her performance of A Leaf's Devotion to Its Root, she won Third Prizes in both the Performance and Audience Choice categories, making her the first Chinese pop singer to win an award at an international competition.

Mao rose to household fame with her performance of Yearning on the 1988 CCTV's Spring Festival Gala, the most watched show in China and the world. In early 1989, Mao was involved in a tax evasion scandal when The Harbin Evening News reported that Mao earned 60,000 yuan for a five-day performance in Heilongjiang province but evaded nearly 40,000 yuan in taxes. Mao was subsequently imposed a disciplinary warning and placed under three months of house arrest by the Frontline Song and Dance Troupe, until her back taxes and fines, totally 230, 000 yuan, were claimed. After being released, in July 1989, Mao attempted suicide by consuming sleeping pills at home but was saved by her father. Due to the negative publicity, she reduced her public performances and focused primarily on recording theme songs for TV shows, most notably the theme song of the same name for the hit show Ke Wang (1990).

In late 1989, she joined the Central Military Commission Political Work Department Song and Dance Troupe. In 1993, Mao was demobilized from the military and joined Hong Kong's Capital Artists, becoming one of the earliest singers from mainland China to sign with a professional music label. This commercial branding marked a change in her musical style and image, which, despite Mao's pride in its feminist and emotional qualities, received mixed reviews at the time.

Mao's career was derailed by the second tax evasion scandal from 1996 to 2000, during which she left China to avoid negative publicity. Shortly after the investigation began in 1996, Mao secretly fled to Hong Kong and became a Hong Kong citizen, before living in the UK, Canada, and Australia in the next four years. In 1998, the tax authorities recovered 637,800 yuan in unpaid taxes from Mao, imposed a fine of 240,000 yuan, and charged late payment fees of 155,700 yuan, a total amount of 1,033,500 yuan.

Mao returned to China in 2000. After her comeback, she became a member of the China Musicians Association. On March 23, 2001, she was honored with the Outstanding Achievement Award in the Top Billboard of 2000 Chinese Pop Music organized by Beijing Radio. In June 2001, she was named the 2001 Inland Outstanding Musician by CCTV and MTV. That same year, Mao was elected a deputy to the China Federation of Literary and Art Circles.

Mao returned to the CCTV Spring Festival Gala in 2009 after 14 years, performing Heaven's Great Love. She also participated in the large-scale musical production The Road to Revival, celebrating the 60th anniversary of the People's Republic of China. In 2011, she held her first solo concert at Beijing's Capital Indoor Gymnasium. In 2015, Mao joined the Hunan TV reality show Divas Hit the Road (Season 2), for which she received negative reviews.

== Personal life ==
Mao's only publicly known boyfriend before her marriage was Zhang Yong, an electric guitarist. They met in 1987, when Zhang was a music editor for the Oriental Song and Dance Troupe, while Mao was in Gu Jianfen's singing training program in Beijing. Mao soon moved in with Zhang, who became her music producer and manager, overseeing the production of her two albums in 1989. After Mao's first tax scandal, Zhang went to study music in Australia in January 1990, and the couple broke up in the spring of that year. After he left China, the Chinese media reported that Zhang had taken Mao's savings away at a low point in her career. In the early 2000s, Zhang publicly accused Mao of exploiting him during her early career and falsely portraying him as the villain to gain public sympathy after her tax scandal, which affected his career in the music industry after he returned to China. Zhang claimed that he paid Mao's fines and back taxes in April 1989 to secure her release from house arrest in Nanjing and gave her nearly all their shared assets when dividing them before his departure to study abroad at Mao's insistence. Mao, however, claimed that she and her father paid the fines and back taxes in September of that year. Zhang also revealed that the reason for their breakup was the influence of a female singer, who told Mao that she was out of Zhang's league. Through the singer's introduction, Mao met a wealthy British businessman based in Singapore and began an affair before Zhang left China. Zhang's relationship with Mao is detailed in his memoir, published in 2004.

In 2002, Mao met businessman Xie Zhikun, founder of Zhongzhi Enterprise Group, and married him the next year. Xie was listed on the 2014 Hurun Rich List with a net worth of 12 billion yuan. The couple have a daughter, Xie Fengming (also known as Xie Jiatong), born in 2004, followed by a son, born either in 2006 or 2008. In 2021, Xie Fengming appeared in the film Chinese Doctors, which was produced by Bona Film Group, a company indirectly backed by the Zhongzhi Enterprise Group. Mao also has a stepdaughter, Xie Rutong, born in 1986, from Xie's first marriage, Xie died from a heart attack in 2021.

== Filmography ==
- Love on the Cloud (2014)

== See also ==
- The Same Song
