= Gu Jianfen =

Chinese composer (born 1935)

- 谷建芬
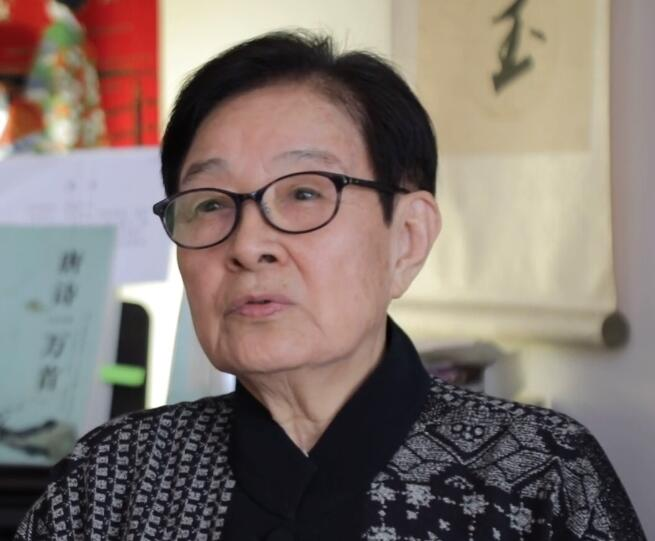
- Gu in January 2020
- Born: 21 March 1935 (age 91); Osaka, Empire of Japan
- Education: Shenyang Conservatory of Music
- Occupation: Composer
- Political party: China Zhi Gong Party

Gu Jianfen (Chinese: 谷建芬; born 21 March 1935) is a Chinese composer. She is best known for writing "The Kiss from Mother", "Young Friends Come Together," and "The Affection of Green Leaves to the Roots".

== Early life and education ==
Gu was born in Osaka, Japan in 1935, but her family was originally from Weihai, China. She and her family moved back to China and settled in Dalian in 1942. She studied at the Luda Art Troupe, Lu Xun Academy of Fine Arts and the Shenyang Conservatory of Music. She graduated from the latter in 1955.

== Career ==
After graduation, Gu became a composer for the China National Song and Dance Ensemble. Three years after her work began there, she was sent to a rural part of Jiangsu as part of the Chinese Cultural Revolution's labor reforms. She studied folk music during her time there, and was able to compose songs again in 1976.

From 1984 to 1989 she ran the Gu Jianfen Vocal Training Center, where she trained singers like Mao Amin, Na Ying, and Sun Nan. Though Gu has written hundreds of songs, she is best known for writing songs like "The Kiss from Mother," "Young Friends Come Together," and "The Affection of Green Leaves to the Roots," which won the Yugoslavia Belgrade International Pop Music Award. She also adapted songs from Chinese literature, like the San Zi Jing and the Di Zi Gui.

Gu is also politically active. She was a council member for several organizations, such as the China International Culture Exchange Center, China Council for the Promotion of Peaceful National Reunification, and Beijing Municipal Association for Friendship with Foreign Countries. She also served as the vice president of the Chinese Musician's Association in 1999. She has been a member of the Zhi Gong party since 1982, and served as a member of their 9th and 10th central committees.

She was a member of the 6th Chinese People's Political Consultative Conference and the 8th, 9th and 10th Standing Committee of the National People's Congress.
