= Chin Kung =

Chinese monk (1927–2022)

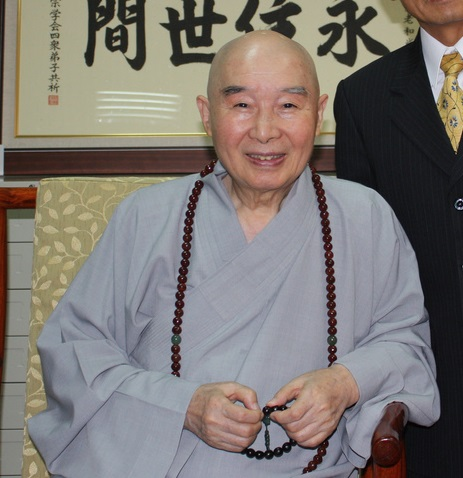
- Title: Most Venerable; Dharma Master

Personal life
- Born: Hsu Yeh-hung; 13 March 1927 Lujiang County, Anhui, China
- Died: 26 July 2022 (aged 95) Tainan, Taiwan
- Occupation: Buddhist monk and scholar
- Website: www.amtb.org.tw

Religious life
- Religion: Buddhism
- School: Pure Land

Senior posting
- Teacher: Lee Ping-nan (李炳南)
- Students: Master Wu Xing, Master Wu Dao

Chin Kung AM (淨空; pinyin: Jìngkōng; 13 March 1927 – 26 July 2022) was a Chinese Buddhist monk and scholar from the Mahayana tradition. He was the founder of the Corporate Body of the Buddha Educational Foundation, an organization based on the teachings of Pure Land Buddhism. He was known for his teaching of Pure Land Buddhism and work in promoting inter-faith harmony in Australia and the Asia-Pacific region.

== Early life ==
Born as Hsu Yeh-hung (徐業鴻, Xú Yèhóng) in Lujiang County, Anhui, in 1927 Chin Kung received some classical Confucian education from a tutor in his hometown. At the age of ten, he moved with his family to Fujian where his father was posted as a chief secretary for the country government. When the Second Sino-Japanese War erupted, Hsu's father joined the National Revolutionary Army. Due to the disruptions of war, which he described as 'unsettling and traumatic', he had to hike with other schoolchildren further inland to Guizhou province in the southwest to avoid battlefront areas. He studied at the National Third Kuichou High School during the Second World War, and then at Nanking First Municipal High School following the war. His formal secular education ended in 1947, when his father died, depriving the family of their only breadwinner.

In 1949, after the communist victory in the Chinese Civil War, he moved to Taiwan and spent thirteen years as a clerk at the Shihchien Institute, a training institution for military officers, studying Buddhism and Philosophy in his spare time under the guidance of Professor Fang Tung-mei (方東美), Changkya Khutukhtu (章嘉呼圖克圖 a master in Mongolian Buddhism), and lay teacher Lee Ping-nan (李炳南). He entered the monastic life in 1959, and was ordained at Lintzi Temple at Yuanshan in Taipei, Taiwan. It was then that he received the dharma name of Chin Kung, meaning "pure emptiness". He started studying under Lee Ping-nan in Taichung in 1958 and trained under him for ten years. At the time, there was an oversupply of monks in Taipei, due to an influx of refugees from mainland China, and there was not enough positions in temples for them. Furthermore, associates of Lee were viewed unfavourably by the establishment, as lay dharma teacher Lee was frowned upon for intruding into what was seen as the domain of ordained monks.

In 1961, Chin Kung was ordained a Buddhist monk.

== Establishment ==
Chin Kung was unsuccessful in finding a temple in Taipei, so in 1966, he accepted the offer of lay supporter Han Ying, and moved into her family home for 17 years. Han helped Chin Kung by renting venues for him to give dharma talks, and he also travelled to the south of the island to give teachings, including at Buddhist institutions run by Hsing Yun. Chin Kung also taught at the Chinese Culture University from 1975 to 1980. In 1979, with the help of Han, Chin Kung set up the Hwa Dzan Buddhist Library in Taipei, allowing him a stable physical base for his activities. From the late 1970s on, Chin Kung's international profile increased, and he received requests to travel to Singapore, Hong Kong, the US and Malaysia among other places to give Buddhist teachings, and in the process, set up like-minded local Buddhist groups. In 1997, after Han's death, he relocated his base to Singapore, where he was patronised by businessman and lay Buddhist organiser Li Muyuan, before relocating to Australia in 2002.

== Teaching and writing ==
Chin Kung became well known for using modern technology to spread the Buddha's teachings. Starting in the 1970s, his lectures were recorded on audio, videotapes, and then later on CDs and DVDs and the internet for wide distribution in many temples, where they can be freely passed on, at a time when Buddhist teachings were not readily available in electronic formats. In 2003, a lay disciple named Chen Caiqiong founded Hwazan TV, a cable channel that broadcasts Chin Kung's teachings 24 hours a day, seven days a week.

He is known for in-depth exposition series on many core Mahayana texts, such as the Avatamsaka Sutra (Flower Adornment Sutra), Surangama Sutra, Lotus Sutra (Dharma Flower Sutra), Diamond Sutra, Platform Sutra (Sutra of the Sixth Patriarch Huineng), and Infinite Life Sutra. Since the 1960s, he has been known for his attention to detail in delivering his teachings, rather than building temples. Even in his late 80s, was giving dharma talks for four hours a day. His teaching style comprised focusing on one sutra at a time, and explaining it verse by verse, covering a few passages in each lecture, meaning that a complete lecture series on any given sutra can take several months or more than a year. According to Chinese Buddhism researcher Sun Yafei, Chin Kung has "an exceptional ability to communicate doctrinal points [in] language comprehensible even to people with little education" and credits his "skillful use of ... life experience ... to hold the attention of the audience, and lends his messages persuasive power."

Chin Kung emphasised moral cultivation and that by practicing virtue and avoiding vice, a person can change their karma. He sought to repopularise The Codes of Conduct for Students and Children (Dizigui), a Confucian primer, advocating that it can help purify the mind and harmonize human relationships.

Chin Kung was known to study the teachings of other philosophical and religious traditions, and was known for emphasising the philosophy of "kindness, fraternity, sincerity, and humility". Since the late 1990s, Chin Kung organised and participated in interfaith forums across the globe, emphasising the importance of education and exhorting religious teachers to set an example by practicing the teachings of the sages and saints in their daily lives, and humbly learning from other religions.

Chin Kung founded and led the Hwa Dzan Society of Propagating Teachings, Hwa Dzan Monastery, Hwa Dzan Buddhist Library, Hwa Dzan Lecture Hall, and The Corporate Body of the Buddha Educational Foundation (1984). He sponsored the printing and the free of charge public distribution of Buddhist texts worldwide, as well as portraits and pictures of various Buddhas and Bodhisattvas. As of 2005, he had organised the printing and dissemination of over three million texts and more than a million portraits of Buddhist figures. In his later years, Chin Kung emphasized the Infinite Life Sutra and the Pure Land cultivation method of Buddha recitation, mainly featuring the recitation of Amitābha Buddha's name.

Partly due to his use of technology, he was widely recognised in his adopted homeland of Taiwan and was a frequent presence on television stations such as Hwadzan Television.

He resided in Australia for many years and was based in the regional city of Toowoomba, near the Queensland state capital of Brisbane. In 2001, he established the present form of the Pure Land Learning College Association in Toowoomba, Australia, to further propagate Buddhism and train Buddhist monks and nuns, and had started (as of 2005) 15 Pure Land Learning Centres across the world. He supported the Buddhist Educational Foundation at the University of Sydney and sponsored the Institution for Peace and Conflict Resolution at the University of Queensland.

He spent most of the last twenty years of his life in Hong Kong.

In 2016, he worked with the British government and the University of Wales Trinity Saint David to promote study in Sinology in order to revitalize the teaching of the ancient sages of China.

=== In the People's Republic of China ===
After the suppression of religion in the PRC during the Cultural Revolution, there was a lack of religious teachers. Chin Kung's cassette tape teachings entered the People's Republic of China in 1984 and quickly became popular. After the post-Mao relaxation in religious policy, major demand existed for Buddhist teachings. Chin Kung's visits to the PRC drew huge crowds. Beginning in the 1990s, grassroots lay groups spread in China to study Chin Kung's teachings and practice sites also developed. Chin Kung was involved in establishing the Lujiang Cultural Educational Center in his hometown of Anhui; his overseas disciples established the center.

Parts of the Chinese Buddhist establishment viewed the expanding Chin Kung movement as a threat. In 1997, Abbot Mingxue of Lingyanshan Temple organized a campaign to criticise Chin Kung. Some monastic community leaders contended that Chin Kung was inciting lay usurpation of monastic authority and leading lay Buddhists into error.

Academic Yanfei Sun writes, "[U]nder pressure from the Buddhist establishment, and because of their own concerns with an overseas religious figure having enormous charismatic holder over a massive movement in China, state agencies took a number of measures after 2008," including closing down the Lujiang Cultural Educational Center, closing down local practice groups, and requiring practice sites that promoted Chin Kung's teachings to divest of his influence. The state also prohibited Chin Kung from traveling to mainland China.

Chin Kung continued to be the most popular teacher among the lay Buddhist community in the PRC until 2010. Around that time, other teachers and adherents of Pure Land Buddhism began using similar modern media methods to circulate their teachings, such as Da'an of Donglin Temple. Chin Kung's movement gradually declined as others began teaching in this niche.

Chin Kung praised Xi Jinping, describing him as a bodhisattva incarnate.

== Achievements ==
In 2002, Chin Kung he was awarded an honorary professorship from the University of Queensland and an honorary doctorate from Griffith University, both in Brisbane, Australia. In December 2003, he was appointed the Honorary Founding Patron of the Australian Centre for Peace and Conflict Studies at the University of Queensland. In April 2004, he was awarded an honorary doctorate by the University of Southern Queensland. In June 2004, he was awarded an honorary doctorate of Syarif Hidayatullan State Islamic University, Jakarta, in Indonesia.

In June 2005, the Most Venerable Chin Kung was appointed a Member of the Order of Australia in the General Division. He was recognised for "service to the Buddhist community in Queensland, particularly through the promotion of Buddhism and the fostering of interfaith activities between diverse ethnic groups, and to the community through support for educational and health institutions".

In September 2017, the "Association of Chin Kung's Friends at UNESCO" was established at the UNESCO Headquarters in Paris, aiming to "promote religious unity, restore religious education, and promote traditional culture".

== Understanding of Buddhism ==
Chin Kung taught that practicing Pure Land Buddhism was the "best path to salvation."

In his view, salvation depends on one's own actions, and clerical mediation plays no role. Thus, he contended that lay Buddhists could achieve greater spiritual enlightenment than monastics, that lay Buddhists could teach Buddha dharma to monks, and that lay Buddhists could build and manage temples.

Chin Kung categorized Buddhism in practice into four different types. First, traditional Buddhism, the teachings of Buddha Shakyamuni, which is very rare in our days. Second, religious Buddhism, which does not represent the real Buddhism but has become recognized by the society, as temples nowadays no longer practice intense teachings and meditation as they once did. Third, academic Buddhist studies as taught in many universities today, where Buddhism is treated purely as a philosophy. This is not comprehensive as the dharma covers everything essential to human beings. Finally, the total degeneration of Buddhism into a cult, which came into being in the late 20th century, and does great harm to society. Chin Kung tried to correct these misunderstandings and lead the public back to the original form of Buddhism as taught by Sakyamuni Buddha.

== Death ==
After 62 years of expounding Buddhism, Chin Kung retired from teaching in 2021 and resigned from all of his positions in April 2022. He died at the age of 95 on 26 July 2022 in Tainan, Taiwan.

== Books ==
Chin Kung has authored the following books

- The Art of Living
- Buddhism as an Education
- Buddhism: The Awakening of Compassion and Wisdom
- The Collected Works of Chin Kung
- Path to True Happiness
- To Understand Buddhism
- The Essence of the Infinite Life Sutra
