= List of sources of Vietnamese culinary history =

This is a list of historical Vietnamese sources referring to Vietnamese cuisine. For thousands of years, Vietnamese women have been the "ladies of the house" and skilled homemakers, capable of preparing a great variety of dishes, from the rustic bánh đúc, bún riêu cua, and bánh đa to the most exquisite delicacies.

There have also been talented male chefs cooking for the royalty, such as those from Ước Lễ village in Thăng Long (Hanoi) or Phước Yên village in Phú Xuân (Huế). Furthermore, Vietnam has produced many legendary gourmets and food writers, including Tản Đà, Thạch Lam, Vũ Bằng, Nguyễn Tuân, Băng Sơn, and Nguyễn Duy.

It is estimated that Vietnamese cuisine has more than 3,000 different dishes.

Title	Vietnamese title	Date	Author	Description
A Detailed Record of Essential Botanical Studies	Thực Vật Tất Khảo Tường Lục	c. 1735	Unknown	A manuscript written in chữ Nôm, contains 189 purely Vietnamese dishes which were consumed across all social classes.
A Comprehensive Guide to Women's Domestic Arts	Nữ Công Thắng Lãm	1760	Lê Hữu Trác (alias Hải Thượng Lãn Ông)	A collection of traditional folk dishes of Đại Việt.
Essai sur les Tonkinois (Essay on the Tonkinese)	Khảo Luận về người Bắc Kỳ	1907	Georges Dumoutier	Describes numerous foods and drinks in Northern Vietnam at the beginning of the 20th century.
Poetic Description of the Customs of Cochinchina	Nam Kỳ phong tục diễn ca	1906	Nguyễn Liên Phong	Contains 7,000 verses in lục bát form.
One Hundred Food Recipes	Thực Phổ Bách Thiên	1913	Trương Đăng Thị Bích	Uses poetry to describe the preparation of 100 dishes.
