= Zhongzhi Capital =

Chinese asset management company

ZhongZhi Capital
- Company type: Subsidiary
- Industry: Investment management
- Founded: 2011; 15 years ago
- Headquarters: Beijing, China
- Area served: China
- Owners: Zhonghai Shengrong (Beijing) Capital Management Limited Company (95%), Beijing Zhonghai Jurong Investment Management Limited Company (5%)
- Parent: Zhongzhi Enterprise Group
- Website: www.zzcapital.com

Zhongzhi Capital (abbreviated as ZZ Capital) is a Chinese asset management company which is headquartered in Beijing. The company was founded in 2011 with registered capital of RMB 1bn. It is registered with the Asset Management Association of China and is a subsidiary of Zhongzhi Enterprise Group.

The company focuses on investments in companies in the media and entertainment, internet and related services, manufacturing, healthcare, financial services, information technology and logistics sectors.

== History ==
The company was founded in 2011.

By 2016, ZZ Capital owned a Hong Kong listed platform - ZZ Capital International. ZZ Capital International was listed in Hong Kong Stock Exchange, and licenses for futures trading and asset management. On September 7, 2016, ZZ Capital International had officially changed its name from "Asian Capital" to "ZZ Capital International", with its Hong Kong Stock Exchange stock code (08295) unchanged. ZZ Capital will start its own asset management business, and assist ZZ Capital International to establish a sustainable business ecosystem. ZZ Capital ended with a total comprehensive loss of HK$27.54 million in the Third Quarter Fiscal year 2016.

In May 2016, Michael Cho joined as an executive director and CEO of ZZ Capital International. Cho would be paid a basic salary of US$1.8 million per year along with other benefits including a housing allowance of HK$130,000 ($16,755) a month, as well as participation in bonus and stock incentive schemes.

By 2015, according to China Venture Capital & Private Equity Annual Ranking 2015, it is the 18th largest domestic private equity firm.

In 2016, Zhongzhi Capital was investigated by the China Securities Regulatory Commission (CSRC) and was found guilty of multiple offences, and violations that included:

- No risk assessment was performed on Zhongzhi's private funds that were established after 21 August 2014, specifically; they do not meet the "Interim Measures for supervision and management of private investment funds" provisions of Article XVII;
- Zhongzhi's legal representative Duan Di, senior management personnel Zhang Yun and Qiu Xiaoyun, have not received the qualifications necessary to manage funds, specifically, their practice qualification did not meet the "Securities Investment Fund Law" provisions of Article IX. According to the public announcement it indicates that Zhongzhi Capital's legal representative Duan Di, have received the qualifications necessary to manage funds, but Qiu Xiaoyun no longer serves as senior management personnel. senior management personnel Zhang Yun

In April 2017, Mr. Chen Jianfeng Peter an executive director and Chief Financial Officer of ZZ Capital International was appointed as alternate director to Ms. Duan Di, the chairman and an executive director of ZZ Capital International.

In May 2019, Hong Kong's Securities and Futures Commission (SFC) completed an investigation into the shareholding of ZZ Capital International. It found that only 20 shareholders held 91.53 per cent of shares, and issued a warning to potential investors to exercise "extreme caution" due to the high concentration of shareholding. Another such warning was issued by SFC in December 2019, stating that 20 shareholders held 91.22 per cent of shares at that time.

In August 2023, the National Financial Regulatory Administration, China's banking regulator, set up a task force to examine risks at Zhongzhi following missed payments by the firm.

== Ownership ==
Zhongzhi Capital is owned by Zhonghai Shengrong (Beijing) Capital Management Limited Company and as Beijing Zhonghai Jurong Investment Management Limited Company as to 95% and 5% respectively.

The ultimate parent company of Zhong Hai Sheng Rong is Zhonghai Sheng Feng (Beijing) Capital Management Limited Company. The ultimate beneficiary of Zhonghai Shengrong (Beijing) Capital Management Limited Company is Xie Zhikun, founder of Zhongzhi Enterprise Group.

== Major Investments ==
- ZZ Capital is a strategic shareholder of ZhongNan (002445 A-Share listed), transforming it from an industrial product manufacturer to a large media & entertainment platform company. The market capitalization of ZhongNan before acquisition was RMB2.4bn.
- In December 2014, Sanju (300072 A-Share listed) announced its private placement plan. ZZ Capital invested RMB400m and became the 5th largest shareholder, with 2.91% shareholding in the company. The market capitalization of Sanju was RMB17.9bn before the announcement of ZZ Capital's investment.
- In September 2015, Zhongzhi Capital and China Profit Investments Limited sold Huazhong Financing and Leasing Co Ltd to Jiangsu Fasten Co Ltd (a related subsidiary and subsequently a related party transaction of ZZ Capital) for US$332 million.
