= Thanh Oai district =

Thanh Oai district Huyện Thanh Oai
- District
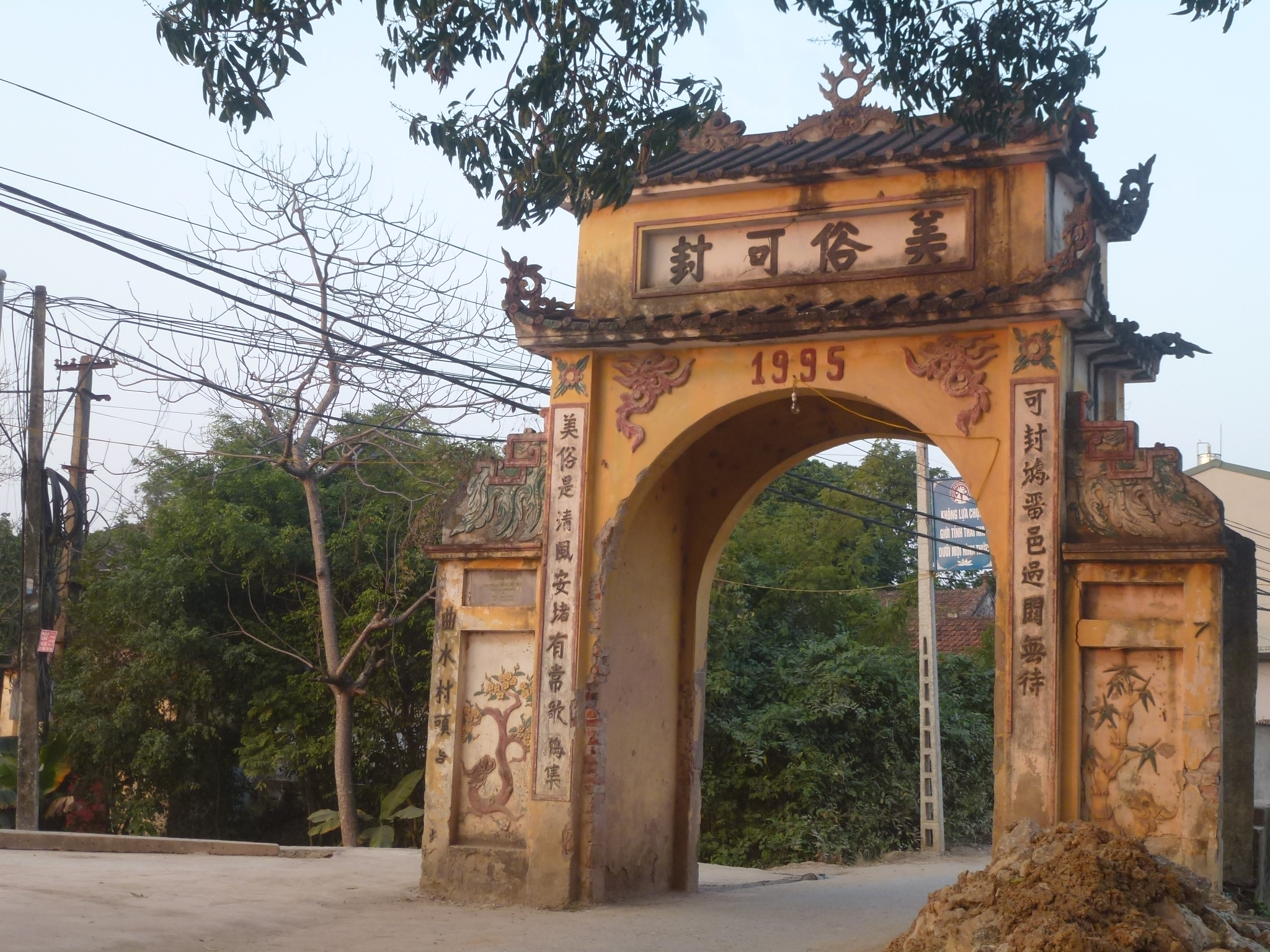
- Gate to Khúc Thủy village

- Seal

- Location within Hanoi
- Coordinates: 20.853715°N 105.768395°E
- Country: Vietnam
- Region: Red River Delta
- Municipality: Hanoi
- Capital: Kim Bài
- Time zone: UTC+7 (Indochina Time)

Thanh Oai is a former rural district (huyện) of Hanoi in the Red River Delta region of Vietnam.

== Geography ==
Thanh Oai district is bordered by Thường Tín district to the east, Thanh Trì district to the northeast, Chương Mỹ district to the west, Phú Xuyên district and Ứng Hòa district to the south, Hà Đông district to the north.

== Subdivisions ==
The district is subdivided to 21 commune-level subdivisions, including the township of Kim Bài (district capital) and the rural communes of Bích Hòa, Bình Minh, Cao Dương, Cao Viên, Cự Khê, Dân Hòa, Đỗ Động, Hồng Dương, Kim An, Kim Thư, Liên Châu, Mỹ Hưng, Phương Trung, Tam Hưng, Tân Ước, Thanh Cao, Thanh Mai, Thanh Thùy, Thanh Văn, Xuân Dương.

The village of Ước Lễ in Tân Ước commune is famous for its chả lụa.
