= Chữ Hán =

Chinese characters used in Vietnamese writing

Chữ Hán Chữ Nho
- Chữ Hán and chữ Nho written in chữ Nôm, with Vietnamese alphabet on the right.
- Script type: Logographic
- Period: 3rd century BC – 20th century AD; Limited present use
- Direction: Top-to-bottom, columns from right to left
- Languages: Literary Chinese, Vietnamese

Related scripts
- Parent systems: Oracle bone script: Seal script; Clerical script; Regular script; Chữ Hán
- Child systems: Chữ Nôm
- Sister systems: Kanji, Hanja, Bopomofo, traditional Chinese, simplified Chinese, Khitan script, Jurchen script, Tangut script, Yi script

Chữ Hán (Vietnamese: 𡨸漢 [t͡ɕɯ˦ˀ˥ haːn˧˦], lit. 'Han characters') are the Chinese characters that were used to write Literary Chinese (Hán văn; 漢文) and Sino-Vietnamese vocabulary in Vietnamese. They were officially used in Vietnam after the Red River Delta region was annexed into the Han dynasty and continued to be used until the early 20th century.

== Terminology ==
The main Vietnamese term used for Chinese characters is chữ Hán (𡨸漢). It is made of chữ meaning 'character' and Hán 'Han (referring to the Han dynasty)'. Other synonyms of chữ Hán includes chữ Nho (𡨸儒 [t͡ɕɯ˦ˀ˥ ɲɔ˧˧], literally 'Confucian characters') and Hán tự (Note: Hán tự is an uncommon term for Chinese characters. In late 19th-early 20th century and modern-day Vietnamese, chữ Hán, along with chữ Nho and chữ Tàu, have been the dominant terms for "Chinese characters". Hán tự started being used due to its perceived archaism and its formality.) (漢字 [haːn˧˦ tɯ˧˨ʔ]) which was borrowed directly from Chinese.

Chữ Nho was first mentioned in Phạm Đình Hổ's essay Vũ trung tùy bút (雨中隨筆 lit. 'Essays in the Rain'), where it initially described a calligraphic style of writing Chinese characters. Over time, however, the term evolved and broadened in scope, eventually coming to refer to the Chinese script in general. This meaning came from the viewpoint that the script belonged to followers of Confucianism. This is further shown with Neo-Confucianism becoming the state ideology of the Lê dynasty.

Classical Chinese is referred to as Hán văn (漢文 [haːn˧˦ van˧˧]) and văn ngôn (文言 [văn˧˧ ŋon˧˧]).

== History ==
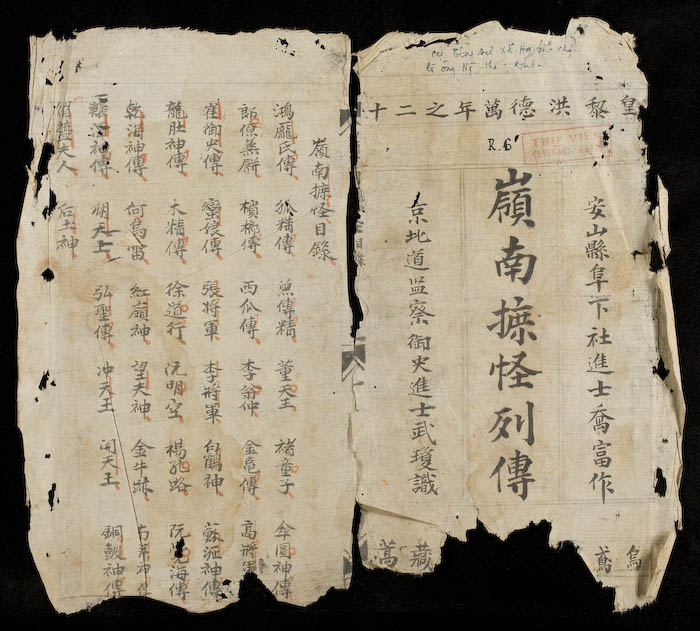
Lĩnh Nam chích quái (嶺南摭怪) is a 14th-century Vietnamese semi-fictional work written in chữ Hán by Trần Thế Pháp.

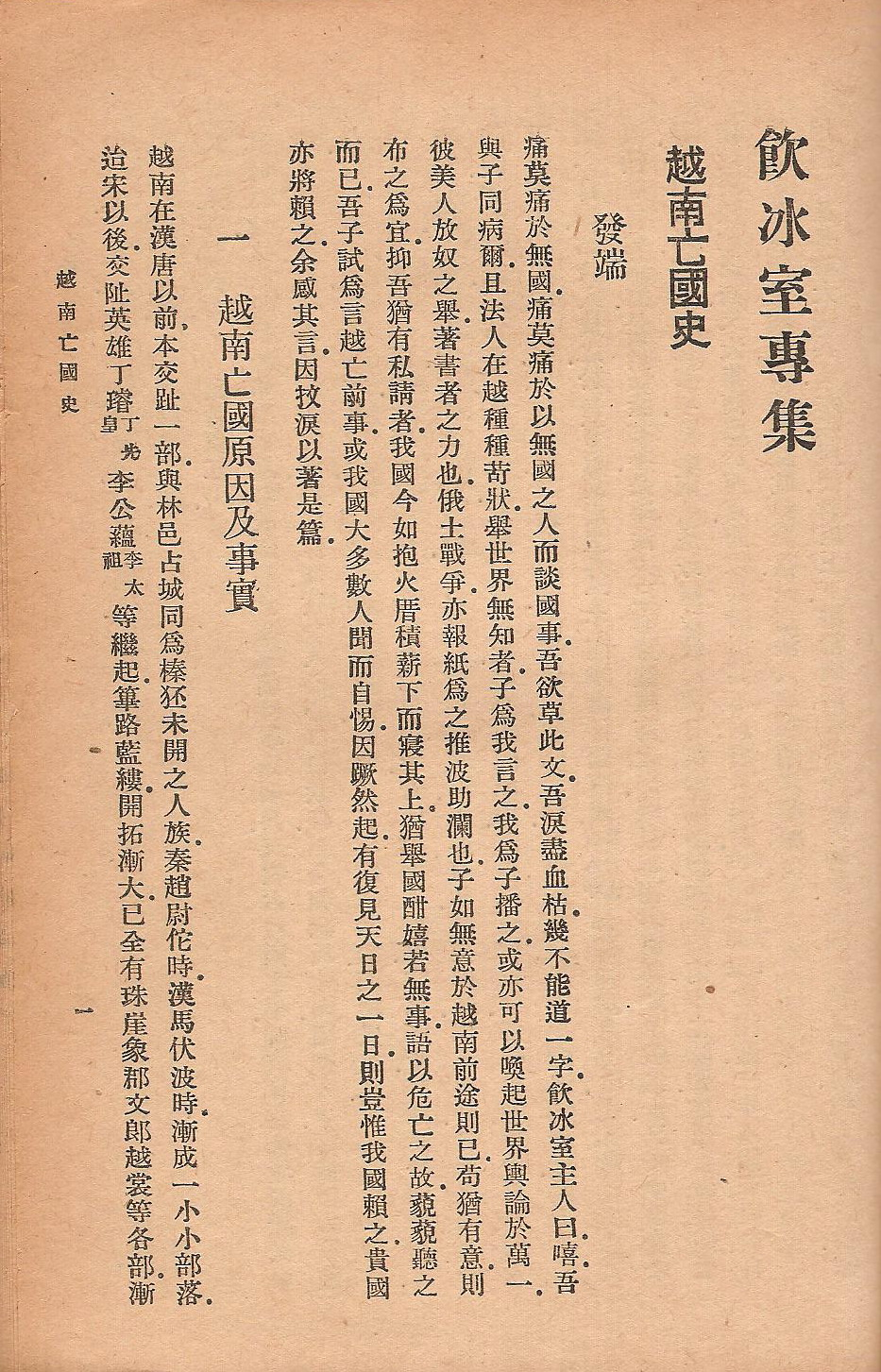
History of the Loss of Vietnam (越南亡國史), is a Vietnamese book written in chữ Hán, written by Phan Bội Châu while he was in Japan. It was published by Liang Qichao, a leading Chinese nationalist revolutionary scholar then in Japan

After the conquest of Nanyue (Vietnamese: Nam Việt; chữ Hán: 南越), parts of modern-day Northern Vietnam were incorporated into the Jiāozhǐ province (Vietnamese: Giao Chỉ; chữ Hán: 交趾) of the Han dynasty. It was during this era, that the Red River Delta was under direct Chinese rule for about a millennium. Around this time, Chinese characters became widespread in northern Vietnam. Government documents, literature, and religious texts such as Buddhist sutras were all written in Literary Chinese (Vietnamese: Hán văn; chữ Hán: 漢文). From independence from China and onward, Literary Chinese still remained as the official language for writing whether if it was government documents or literature. Every succeeding dynasty modeled their imperial exams after China's model. Scholars drew lessons from Neo-Confucianism and used its teachings to implement laws in the country. The spread of Confucianism meant the spread of Chinese characters, thus the name for Chinese characters in Vietnamese is called chữ Nho (literally: 'Confucian characters'; 𡨸儒). Scholars were focused on reading Chinese classics such as the Four Books and Five Classics. While literature in Vietnamese (written with chữ Nôm) was the minority. Literature such as Nam quốc sơn hà (chữ Hán: 南國山河) and Truyền kỳ mạn lục (chữ Hán: 傳奇漫錄) being written with Chinese characters. With every new dynasty with the exception of two dynasties, (Note: The Hồ dynasty (茹胡) and the Tây Sơn dynasty (茹西山) are the only two dynasties that used chữ Nôm officially unlike other dynasties that used Literary Chinese instead.) Literary Chinese and thus Chinese characters remained in common usage.

It was not until in the 20th century that Chinese characters alongside chữ Nôm began to fall into disuse. The French Indo-Chinese administration sought to westernise and modernise Vietnam by abolishing the Confucian court examinations. During this time, the French language was used for the administration. The French officials favoured Vietnamese being written in the Vietnamese alphabet. Chinese characters were still being taught in classes (in South Vietnam) up to 1975, but failed to be a part of the new elementary curriculum complied by Ministry of Education and Training after the Vietnam War.

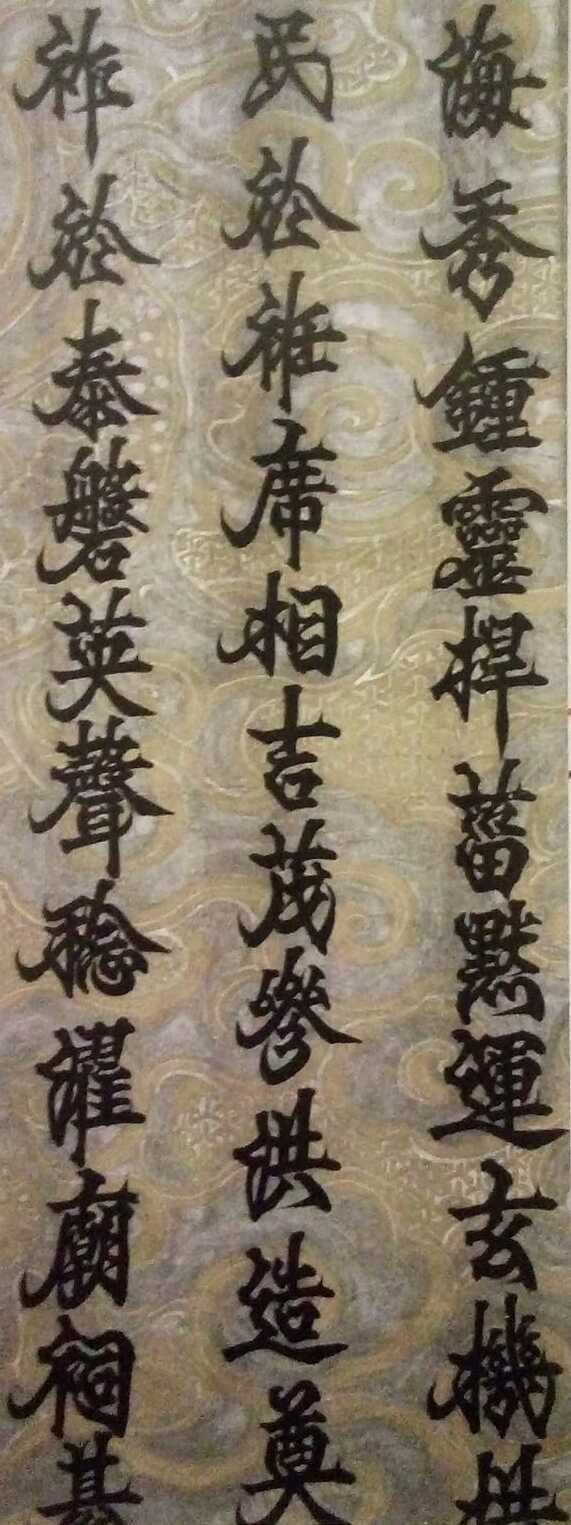
A Vietnamese edict (1765) written in chữ Hán. It uses the Lệnh thư script.

While Chinese characters can still be seen adorning temples and old buildings, Chữ Hán is now relegated to obscure or cultural aspects of Vietnamese life. During Vietnamese festivals, calligraphists write couplets with Chinese characters wishing prosperity and longevity. Such calligraphists are called ông đồ. In the poem "Ông đồ", by Vũ Đình Liên, the author talks about the Vietnamese calligraphy practiced during Tết and how it is no longer appreciated.

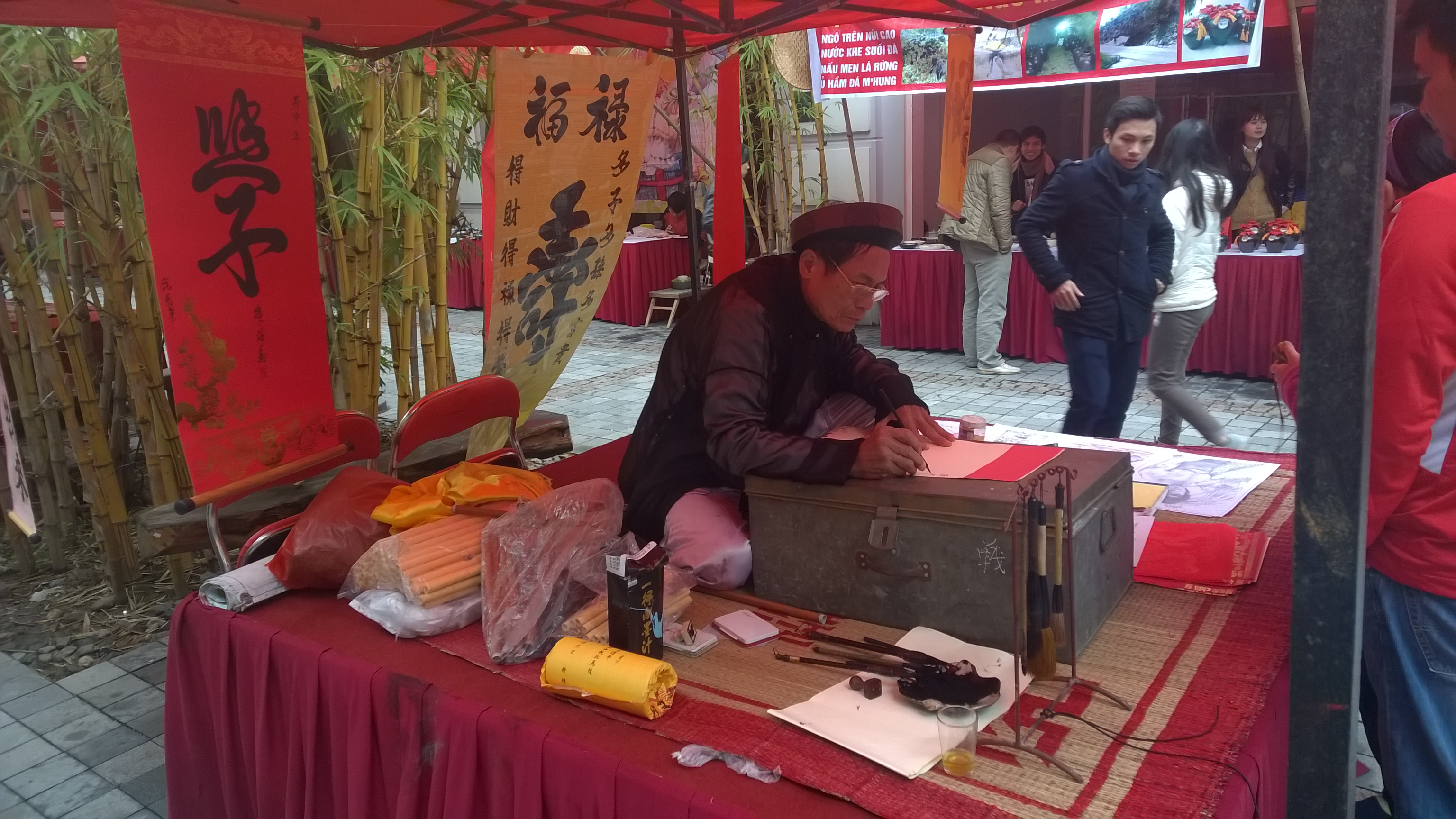
A Vietnamese calligraphist practicing calligraphy written in chữ Hán during Tết.

== Education ==
The preface of Khải đồng thuyết ước (啟童說約; 1853) written by Phạm Phục Trai (范复齋), contains the following passage:

余童年，先君子從俗命之，先讀《三字經》及三皇諸史，次則讀經傳，習時舉業文字，求合場規，取青紫而已。

Dư đồng niên, tiên quân tử tùng tục mệnh chi, tiên độc “Tam tự kinh” cập Tam Hoàng chư sử, thứ tắc độc kinh truyện, tập thì cử nghiệp văn tự, cầu hợp trường quy, thủ thanh tử nhi dĩ.

Tôi hồi tuổi nhỏ nghe các bậc quân tử đời trước theo lệ thường dạy mà dạy bảo, trước hết đọc Tam tự kinh và các sử đời Tam Hoàng, tiếp theo thì đọc kinh truyện, tập lối chữ nghĩa cử nghiệp thời thượng, sao cho hợp trường quy để được làm quan mà thôi.

In my childhood, under the guidance of my elders and conforming to the customs, I first studied the "Three Character Classic" and various histories of the Three Emperors. Afterward, I delved into the classics and their commentaries, honing my skills in calligraphy and writing, aiming to conform to the rules of society and attain a respectable status.

Children around the age of 6–8 begin learning chữ Hán at schools. Students began by learning characters from books such as Nhất thiên tự (一千字; 'one thousand characters'), Tam thiên tự (三千字; 'three thousand characters'), Ngũ thiên tự (五千字; 'five thousand characters'), and the Three Character Classic (三字經). The primers were often glossed with chữ Nôm. As such with Nhất thiên tự (一千字), it was designed to allow students to make the transition from Vietnamese grammar to Classical Chinese grammar. If students read the Chinese characters only, the words will be in an alternating rhyme of three and four, but if it was read with the chữ Nôm glosses, it would be in the Vietnamese lục bát rhyme. These books gave students a foundation to start learning more difficult texts that involved longer sentences and more difficult grammatical structures in Literary Chinese. Students would study texts such as Sơ học vấn tân (𥘉學問津; 'inquiring in elementary studies'), Ấu học ngũ ngôn thi (幼學五言詩; 'elementary learning of the five-character verses'), Minh tâm bảo giám (明心寶鑑; 'precious lessons of enlightenment'), and Minh Đạo gia huấn (明道家訓; 'precepts of Minh Đạo'). These books taught the basic sentences necessary to read Literary Chinese and taught core Confucian values and concepts such as filial piety. In Sơ học vấn tân (𥘉學問津), it has four character phrases that were divided into three sections, one on Chinese history, then Vietnamese history, and lastly on words of advice on education.

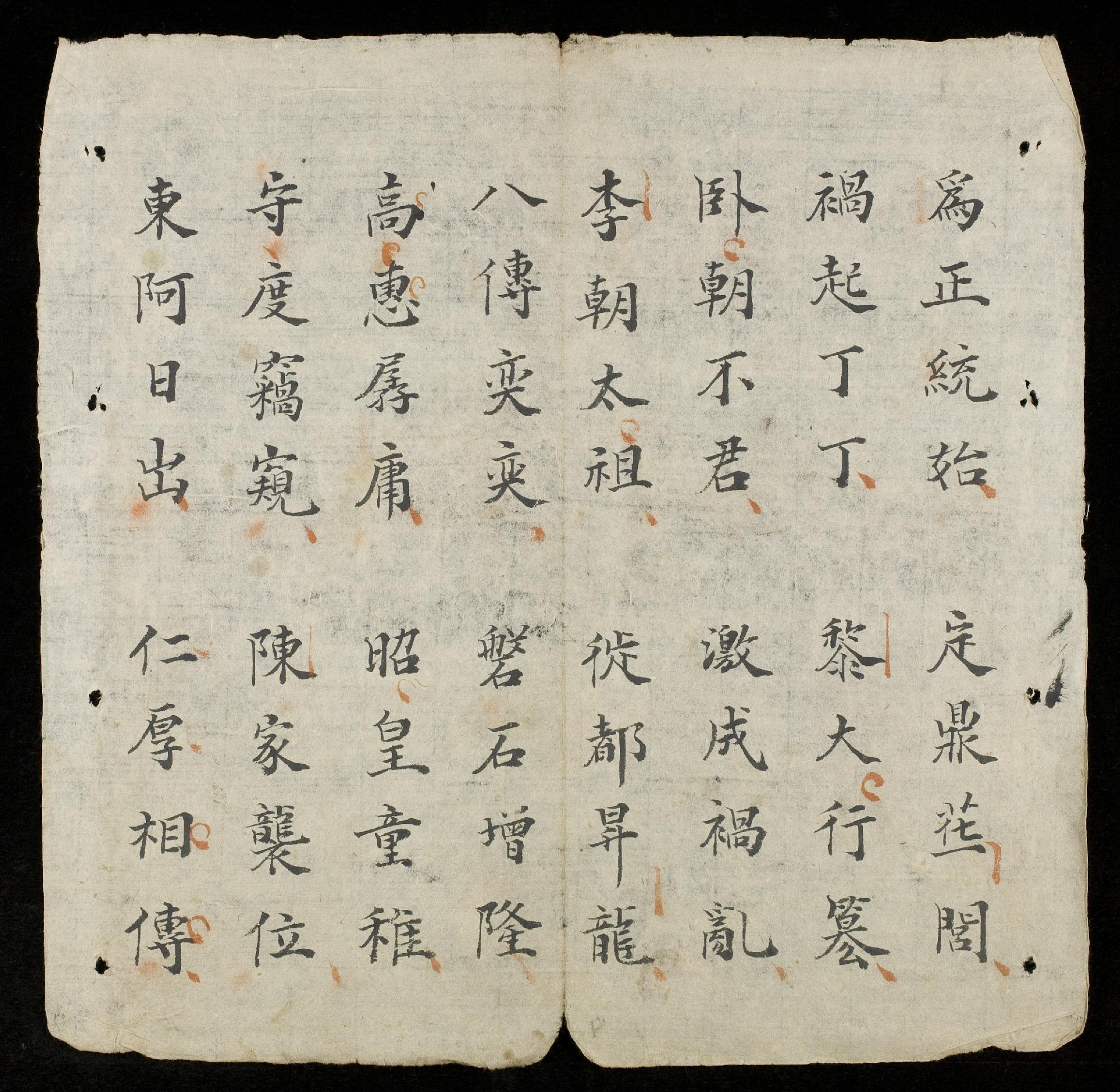
Thiên Nam tứ tự kinh (天南四字經) is a book that was used to teach children the history of Vietnam. (All of the sentences in the book are in four-character phrases.)

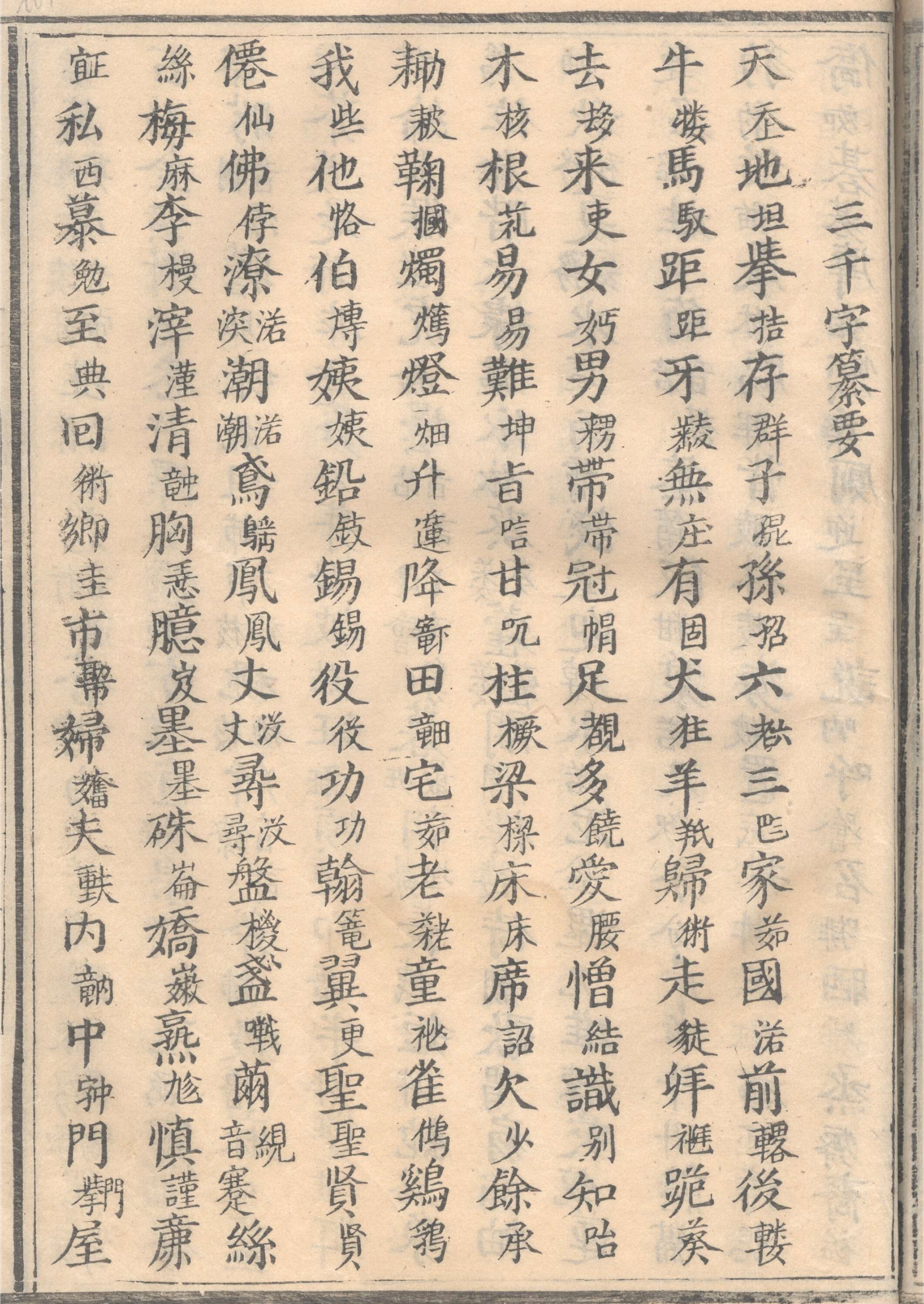
The first page of Tam thiên tự toản yếu (三千字纂要), used to teach children chữ Hán and its equivalent chữ Nôm.

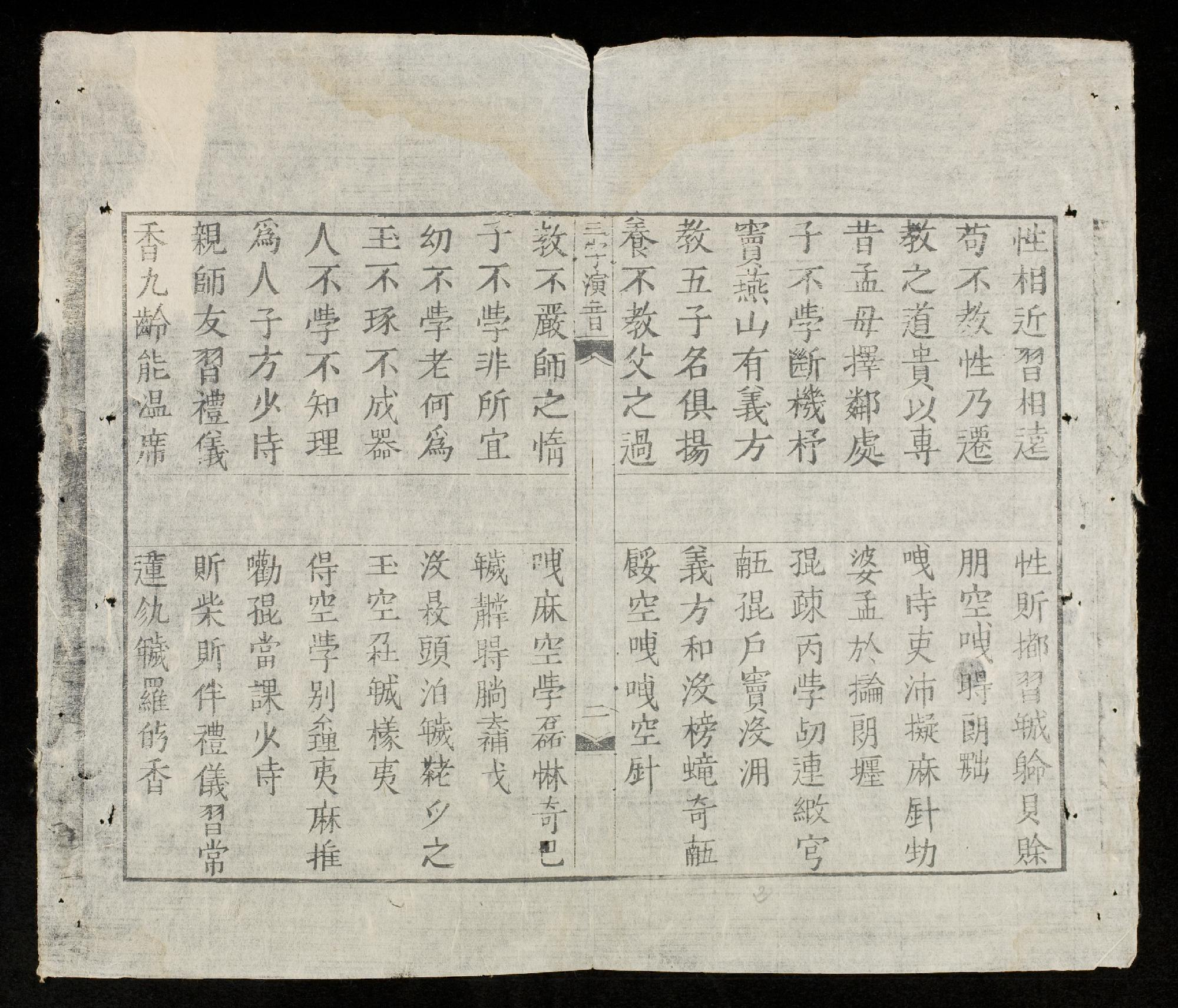
A page of the Three Character Classic, this version specifically is called Tam tự kinh lục bát diễn âm (三字經六八演音). Shown is the original Chinese text above and below is the Vietnamese translation.

During the period of reformed imperial examinations (khoa cử cải lương; 科舉改良) that took place from 1906 to 1919, there were three grades of education. Students would start learning Chinese characters beginning from the age of 6. The first grade level was called ấu học (幼學) (ages 6–12), next was tiểu học (小學) (ages under 27), and then finally, trung học (中學) (ages under 30). Đại học (大學) at this time referred to students studying in the national academies.

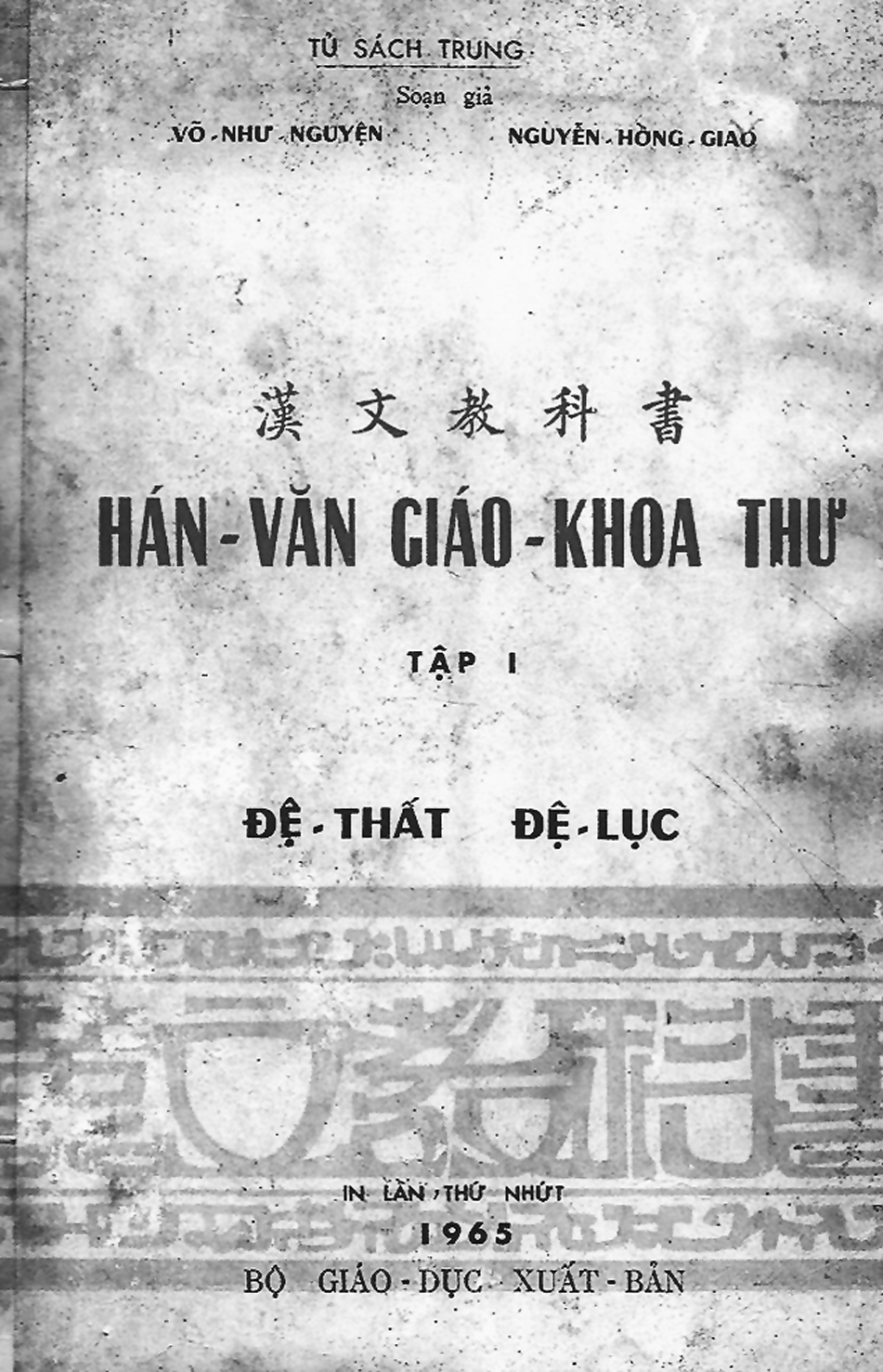
The cover page of Hán-văn Giáo-khoa thư, the textbook used in South Vietnam to teach Literary Chinese and chữ Hán.

The education reform by North Vietnam in 1950 eliminated the use of chữ Hán and chữ Nôm. Chinese characters were still taught in schools in South Vietnam until 1975. During those times, the textbooks that were used were mainly derived from colonial textbooks. There were two main textbooks, Hán-văn tân khóa bản (漢文新課本; 1973) and Hán-văn giáo-khoa thư (漢文敎科書; 1965). (Note: Based on the book, Hán-văn tân giáo-khoa thư (1929).) Students could begin learning Chinese characters in secondary school. The department dealing with Literary Chinese and Chinese characters was called Ban Hán-tự D. Students could either chose to learn a second language such as English and French or choose to learn Literary Chinese. Exams for Literary Chinese mainly tested students on their ability to translate Literary Chinese to Vietnamese. These exams typically took around 2 hours.

== Uses ==
=== Names ===
In Vietnam, many provinces and cities have names that come from Sino-Vietnamese words and were written using Chinese characters. This was done because historically the government administration needed to have a way to write down these names, as some native names did not have characters. Even well-known places like Hanoi (河內) and Huế (化) were written in Chinese characters. Often, villages only had one-word names in Vietnamese.

Some Sino-Vietnamese names were translated from their original names, like Tam Điệp Quan (三疊關) being the Sino-Vietnamese name for Đèo Ba Dội.

Place names
| Chinese characters | Sino-Vietnamese name (tên Chữ) | Chữ Nôm | Vietnamese name (tên Nôm) |
|---|---|---|---|
| 河內 | Hà Nội | 几𢄂 | Kẻ Chợ |
| 紅河 | Hồng Hà | 滝𫡔 | Sông Cái |
| 嘉定 | Gia Định | 柴棍 | Sài Gòn |
| 傘園山 | Tản Viên Sơn | 𡶀𠀧位 | Núi Ba Vì |

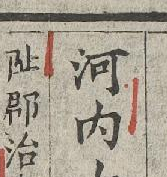
The Sino-Vietnamese name for Hanoi written in chữ Hán, Hà Nội 河内.

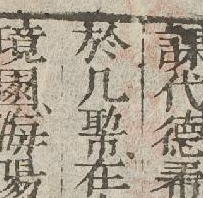
The native Vietnamese name for Hanoi written in chữ Nôm, Kẻ Chợ 几𢄂.

Practically all surnames in Vietnamese are Sino-Vietnamese words; they were once written in Chinese characters. Such as common surnames include Nguyễn (阮), Trần (陳), Lê (黎), Lý (李), etc. (Note: Native names do exist, but are rare. Some examples include Giỏi, Sen, Gái, Nễ, etc.)

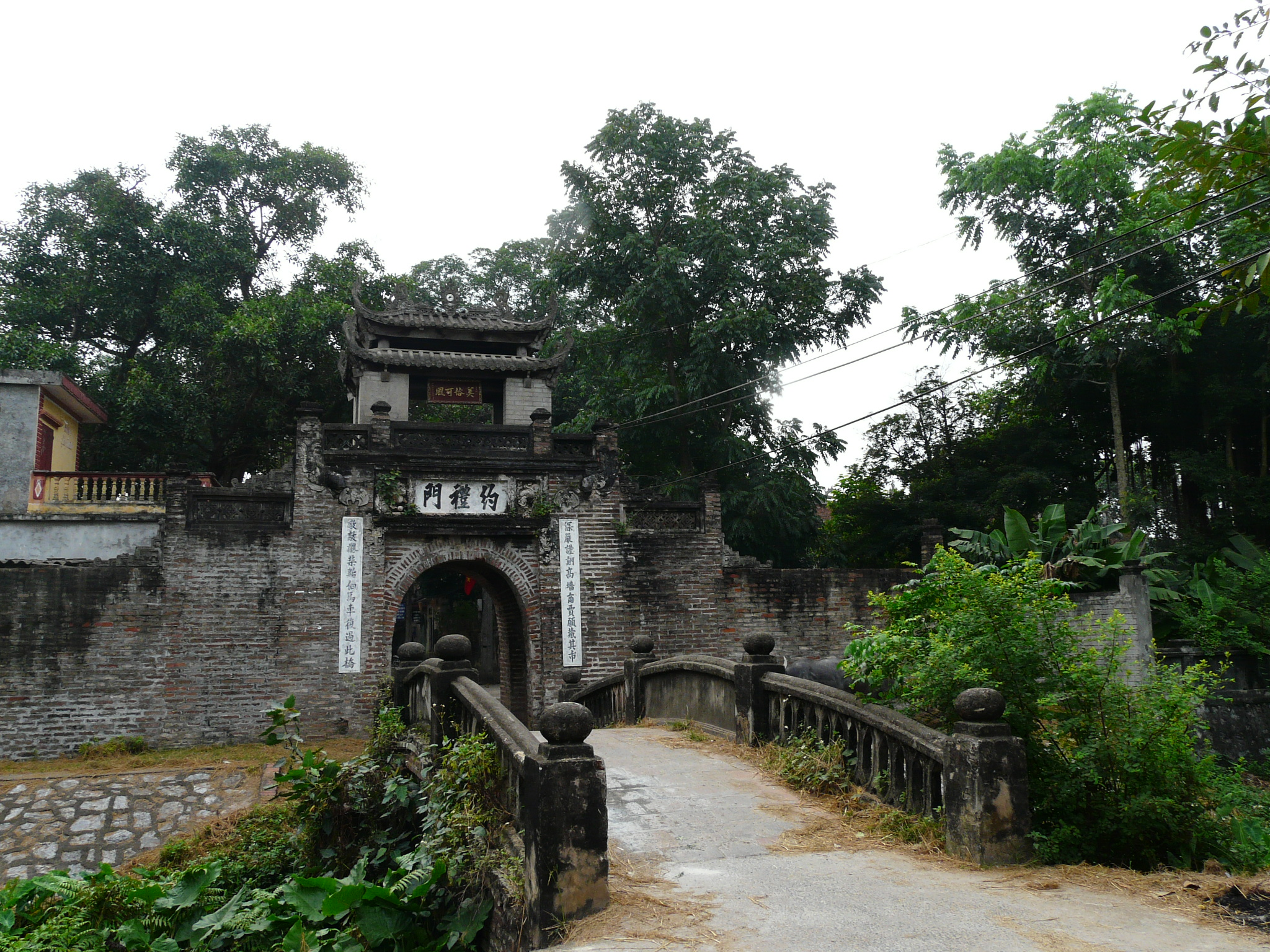
The village gate of Ước Lễ, can still be seen adorned with Chinese characters. The characters read 約禮門 (Vietnamese: Ước Lễ Môn)

== Readings for characters ==
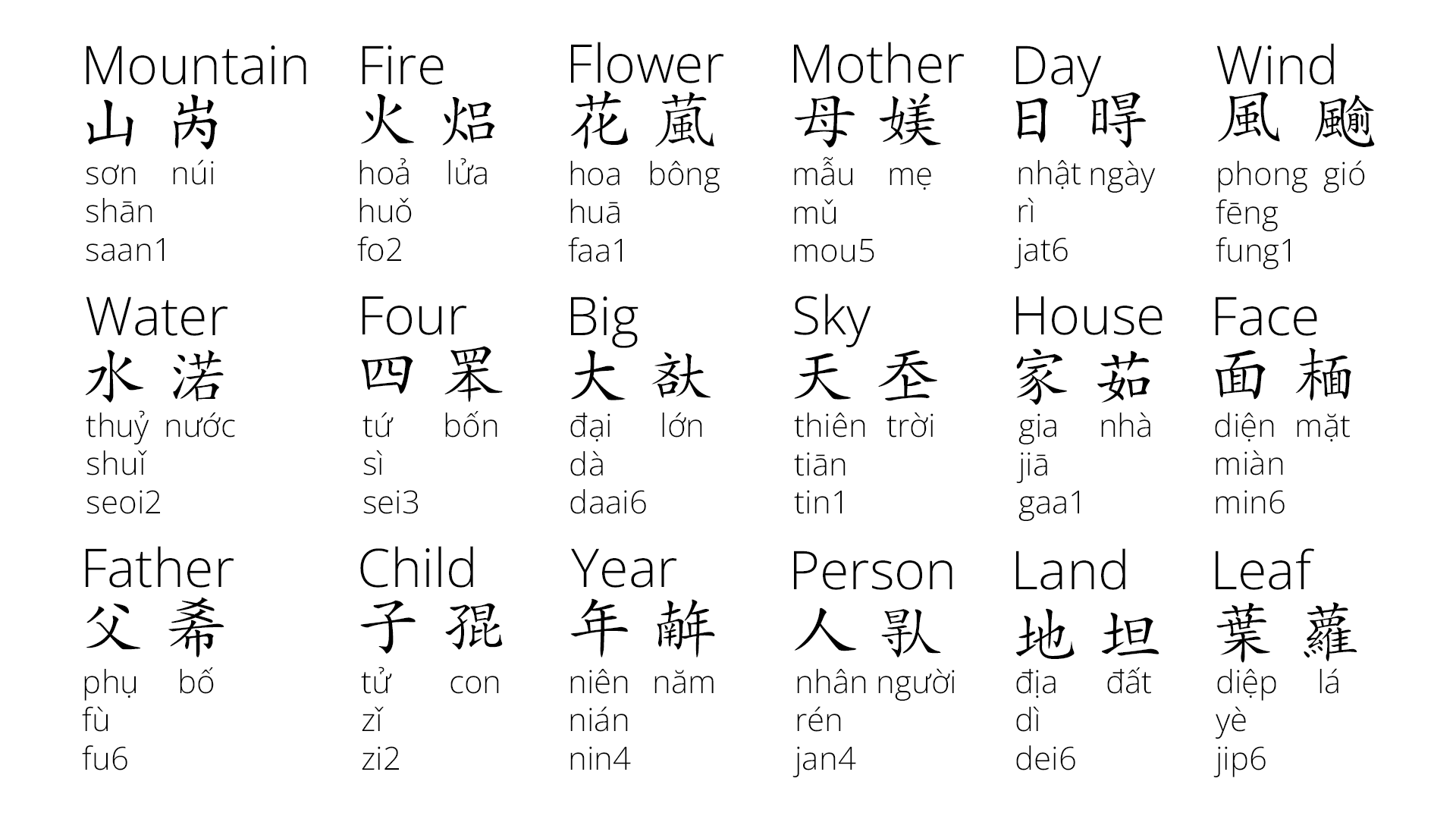
A comparison between Sino-Vietnamese (left) vocabulary with Mandarin and Cantonese pronunciations below and native Vietnamese vocabulary (right).

Owing to historical contact with Chinese characters before the adoption of Chinese characters and how they were adapted into Vietnamese, multiple readings can exist for a single character. While most characters usually have one or two pronunciations, some characters can have up to as many as four pronunciations and more. An example of this would be the character 行 hàng – which could have the readings hàng, hành, hãng, hạng, and hạnh. (Note: This is not including Nôm readings such as hàng, hành, hăng, and ngành.) The readings typically depend on the context and definition of the word. If talking about a store or goods, the reading hàng would be used, but if talking about virtue, the reading hạnh would be used. But typically, knowing what readings was not a large problem due to context and compound words. Most Sino-Vietnamese words are restricted to being in compound words. Readings for chữ Hán, often classified into Sino-Vietnamese readings and Non-Sino-Vietnamese readings. Non-Sino-Vietnamese readings are derived from Old Chinese and recent Chinese borrowings during the 17th–20th centuries when Chinese people migrated to Vietnam. Most of these readings were food related as Cantonese Chinese had introduced their food into Vietnam. Borrowings from Old Chinese are also referred to as Early Sino-Vietnamese pronunciations according to Mark Alves.

=== Sino-Vietnamese readings ===
Sino-Vietnamese readings are usually referred to as âm Hán Việt (音漢越; literally "sound Sino-Vietnamese"), which are Vietnamese systematic pronunciations of Middle Chinese characters. These readings were largely borrowed into Vietnamese during the late Tang dynasty (618–907). Vietnamese scholars used Chinese rime dictionaries to derive consistent pronunciations for Chinese characters. After Vietnam had regained independence, its rulers sought to build the country on the Chinese model, during this time, Literary Chinese was used for formal government documents. Around this, the Japanese and Koreans also borrowed large amount of characters into their languages and derived consistent pronunciations, these pronunciations are collectively known as the Sino-Xenic pronunciations.

Examples of Sino-Vietnamese readings
| Chinese characters | Sino-Vietnamese | Standard Chinese | Cantonese | Sino-Japanese | Sino-Korean |
|---|---|---|---|---|---|
| 準備 'to prepare' | chuẩn bị | zhǔnbèi | zeon^{2}bei^{6} | junbi | junbi |
| 電話 'telephone' | điện thoại | diànhuà | din^{6}waa^{6-2} | denwa | jeonhwa |
| 四 'four' | tứ, tư | sì | sei^{3}, si^{3} | shi | sa |
| 人民 ' people' | nhân dân | rénmín | jan^{4}man^{4} | jinmin | inmin |
| 地名 'place name' | địa danh | dìmíng | dei^{6}meng^{4-2} | chimei | jimyeong |
| 言語 'language' | ngôn ngữ | yányǔ | jin^{4}jyu^{5} | gengo | eoneo |
| 中國 'China' | Trung Quốc | Zhōngguó | Zung^{1}gwok^{3} | Chūgoku | Jungguk |
| 日本 'Japan' | Nhật Bản | Rìběn | Jat^{6}bun^{2} | Nihon | Ilbon |

=== Non-Sino-Vietnamese readings ===
Non-Sino-Vietnamese readings (âm phi Hán Việt; 音非漢越) are pronunciations that were not consistently derived from Middle Chinese. Typically these readings came from Old Chinese, Cantonese, and other Chinese dialects.

Examples of multiple-borrowed Chinese words
| Chinese (Old > Middle) | Early Sino-Vietnamese | Sino-Vietnamese |
|---|---|---|
| 味 *mjəts > mjɨjH | mùi 'smell, odor' | vị 'flavor, taste' |
| 婦 *bjəʔ > bjuwX | vợ 'wife' | phụ 'woman' |
| 法 *pjap > pjop | phép 'rule, law' | pháp 'rule, law' |
| 劍 *kams > kɨɐm^{H} | gươm 'sword' | kiếm 'sword' |
| 鏡 *kraŋs > kˠiæŋ^{H} | gương 'mirror' | kính 'glass for windows, etc.; eyeglasses' |
| 茶 *rlaː > ɖˠa | chè 'tea or a dessert soup' | trà 'tea' |
| 車 *kʰlja > t͡ɕʰia | xe 'wheeled vehicle' | xa 'rare form of xe' |
| 夏 *ɡraːʔ > ɦˠa^{X} | hè 'summer' | hạ '(literary) summer' |

=== Nôm readings ===
Nôm readings (âm Nôm; 音喃) were used when there were characters that were phonetically close to a native Vietnamese word's pronunciation would be used as a chữ Nôm character. Most chữ Hán characters that were used for Vietnamese words were often used for their Sino-Vietnamese pronunciations rather than their meaning which could be completely different from the actual word being used. These characters were called chữ giả tá (phonetic loan characters), due to them being borrowed phonetically. This was one reason why it was preferred to create a chữ Nôm character rather than using a chữ Hán character causing confusion between pronunciations.

| Chinese character and Standard Chinese pronunciations | Sino-Vietnamese pronunciations | Sino-Vietnamese meaning | Nôm pronunciations | Nôm meaning |
|---|---|---|---|---|
| 些 'xiē' | ta, tá | some; a few; a little; a bit | ta | I, me, we |
| 朱 'zhū' | chu, châu | cinnabar; vermilion | cho | to give, to let, to put; for |
| 別 'bié' | biệt | to divide; to separate | biết | to know |
| 碎 'suì' | toái | shattered; fragmented; shredded | tôi | I, me |
| 羅 'luó' | la | net for catching birds | là | to be, is |
| 嘲 'cháo' | trào | to ridicule; to deride; to scorn; to jeer at | chào | hello, bye |

== Types of characters ==
Chữ Hán can be classified into the traditional classification for Chinese characters, this is called lục thư (六書, Chinese: liùshū), meaning six types of Chinese characters. The characters are largely based on 214 radicals set by the Kangxi Dictionary.

- Chữ chỉ sự (𡨸指事) – Ideogram; an example would be 上 (thượng, 'above') and 下 (hạ, 'below').
- Chữ tượng hình (𡨸象形) – Pictogram; an example would be 日 (nhật, 'sun') and 木 (mộc, 'tree').
- Chữ hình thanh (𡨸形聲) – Phono-semantic compound; an example would be 銅 (đồng, 'copper, currency') which is made up of semantic 金 [釒] (kim, 'metal') and phonetic 同 (đồng). (Note: Also known as chữ hài thanh (𡨸諧聲); tượng thanh (象聲).)
- Chữ hội ý (𡨸會意) – Compound ideographs; an example would be 武 (vũ [võ], 'military, martial') which is made up of 戈 (qua, 'dagger-axe') and 止 (chỉ, 'foot, to walk').
- Chữ chuyển chú (𡨸轉注) – Derivative cognates, characters that were derived from other characters with similar meaning; an example would be 老 (lão, 'old'), which is a cognate of 考 (khảo, 'elderly').
- Chữ giả tá (𡨸假借) – Phonetic loan; an example would be 法 (Pháp, 'France') is used for the name of France. Other European countries are also referred by a chữ giả tá like 德 (Đức, 'Germany') and 意 (Ý, 'Italy').

== Variants ==
- Vietnamese variant characters

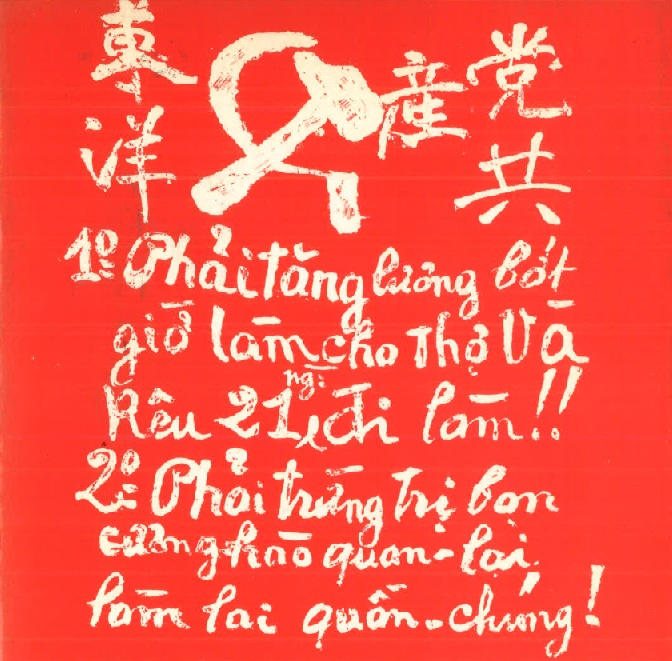
This flag used by the Indochinese Communist Party, uses the simplified character, 党 (top right), instead of the traditional character đảng (黨). The photo says Đảng Cộng sản Đông Dương (党共産東洋; Indochinese Communist Party).

Some chữ Hán characters were simplified into variants of characters that were easier to write, but they are not the same simplified characters used by current-day Chinese. According to Trịnh Khắc Mạnh, when he analysed the early 13th-century book, 釋氏寶鼎行持秘旨全章 (Thích thị Bảo đỉnh hành trì bí chỉ toàn chương), he found that the number of character variants is double the number of variants borrowed from China. This means that Vietnamese variant characters may differ from Chinese variants and simplified characters, for example:

- The word 羅 la (Note: The Nôm reading of the character is là 'to be'. 羅 is a very common character in Nôm texts.) is simplified into 罗 in Chinese, but it is different in Vietnamese, 𱺵 (⿱罒𪜀). Other variants include 𦉼 (⿱罒大) and 𪜀 (⿻十ㄣ).
- Another example would be the character 沒 một which is simplified into 没 in Chinese and was simplified from 沒 to 𱥺 (⿰氵𠬠), then finally, 𠬠 (⿱丷又).
- The word 濫 lạm was simplified into 滥 in Chinese, but was simplified from 濫 to 滥 to 𪵯 (⿰氵𫜵) to 𫜵 (⿴𰀪⺀) in Vietnamese.

Some characters matching Simplified Chinese do exist, but these characters are rare in Vietnamese literature.

There are other variants such as 𭓇 học (variant of 學; ⿳⿰〢⿻丨𰀪冖子) and 𱻊 nghĩa (variant of 義; ⿱𦍌又).

Another prominent example is the character, 𫢋 phật (⿰亻天) which is a common variant of the character 佛 meaning 'Buddha'. It is composed of the radicals 人 nhân [亻] and 天 thiên, all together meaning 'heavenly person'.

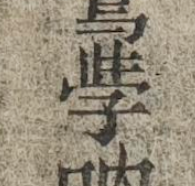
𭓇, a variant of 學.

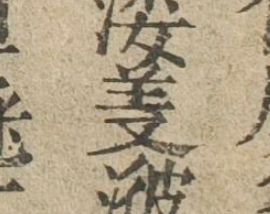
𱻊, a variant of 義.

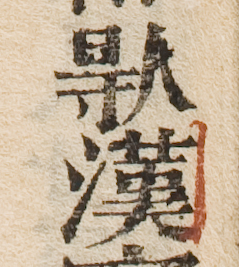
In Vietnamese writing, 𦰩 is written with 龷 on top. (⿰氵⿱龷⿻口夫).

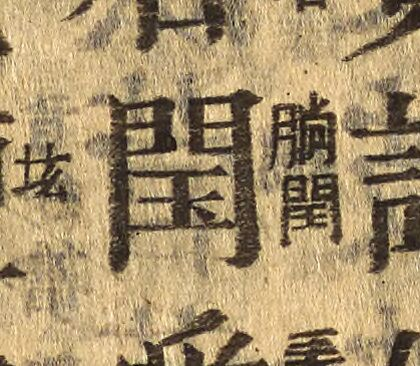
閠, a variant of 閏.

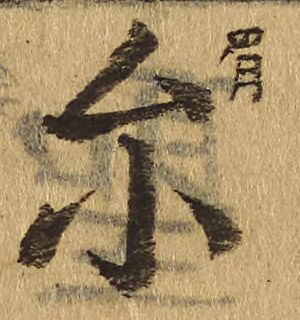
厼, a variant of 爾.

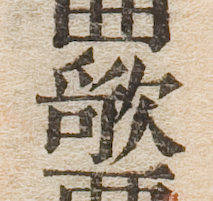
𰙔, a variant of 歌.

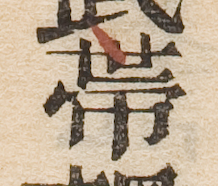
𢃄, a variant of 帶.

== Symbols ==
The character 匕 (chuỷ) or 〻 is often used as an iteration mark to indicate that the current chữ Hán character is to be repeated. This is used in words that use reduplication. For example, in the poem Chinh phụ ngâm khúc (征婦吟曲), the character 悠 (du) is repeated twice in the third line of the poem. It is written as 悠〻 to represent 悠悠 (du du).

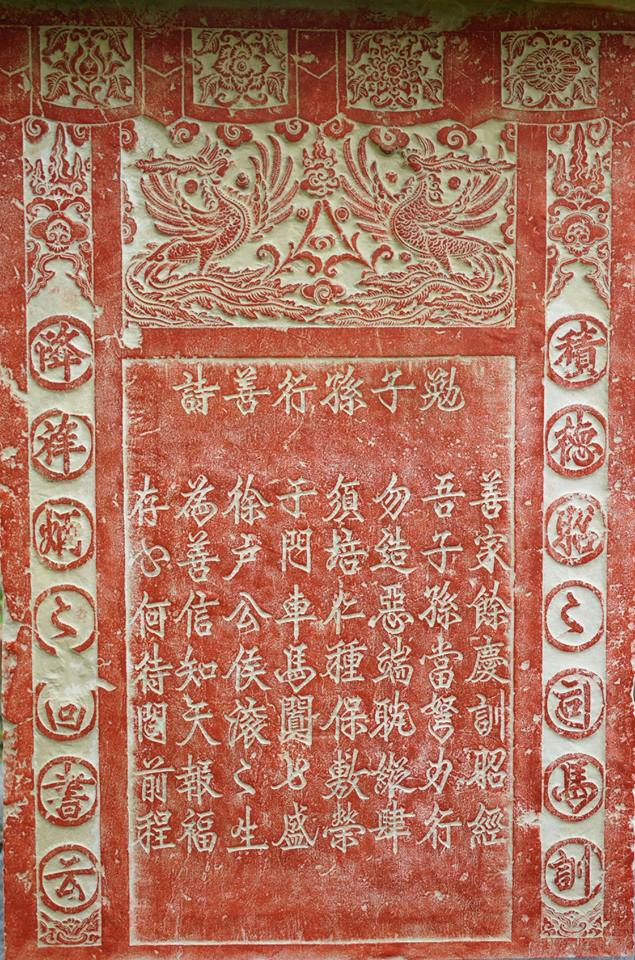
A stele dated from 1660, on it is a poem, Miễn tử tôn hành thiện thi (勉子孫行善詩). It uses 〻 as an iteration mark.

Vietnamese alphabet
"Endlessly distant is that azure sky; who created its cause"

| du | du | bỉ | thương | hề | thuỳ | tạo | nhân |
| 悠 | 〻 | 彼 | 蒼 | 兮 | 誰 | 造 | 因 |

The way the marker is used is very similar to how Chinese and Japanese use their iteration marker 々. Japanese uses 々 as an iteration marker, so, for example, 人人 (hitobito) would be written as 人々 (hitobito).

== See also ==
- Chữ Nôm
- Literary Chinese in Vietnam
- History of writing in Vietnam
- Chinese characters
- East Asian cultural sphere
- Kanji – Japanese equivalent of Chinese characters
- Hanja – Korean equivalent of Chinese characters
- Sino-Vietnamese vocabulary
- Tự Đức thánh chế tự học giải nghĩa ca - Literary Chinese - Vietnamese dictionary
