= Zhongzhi Enterprise Group =

Chinese business conglomerate

- Industry: financial services, wealth management, mining, electric vehicles
- Founded: 1995; 31 years ago
- Founder: Xie Zhikun
- Headquarters: Beijing, China
- Area served: China
- Website: www.zhongzhi.com.cn

Zhongzhi Enterprise Group (Chinese: 中融鼎新, hereafter Zhongzhi) is a Chinese business conglomerate. It has been described as a shadow bank in the Chinese financial system. The company is heavily linked to the Chinese real estate sector, which since 2020 has been experiencing difficulties. At its peak, the company controlled $141 billion in assets. On 5 January 2024, the company declared itself bankrupt.

The company was founded in 1995 by Xie Zhikun, who died in December 2021. The founder's death, and subsequent departure of senior executives, was blamed by the company for its struggles in November 2023.

== Collapse ==
In November 2023, the company noted to investors that it was "heavily insolvent with up to $64 billion in liabilities", or a shortfall of $36.4 billion. It was noted after the fact, that problems had been around since August 2023 when a subsidiary had missed payments. Soon after this, the Chinese authorities started investigations against the company.

On 5 January 2024, Zhongzhi declared bankruptcy at the Beijing First Intermediate People's Court after it could not repay its outstanding debts.

A Beijing court ordered the liquidation of Zhongzhi Enterprise Group and over 300 of its affiliates on April 15, 2026. This marks one of the largest consolidated bankruptcy processes in China's corporate history, with creditors required to submit claims by June.

== Controlled businesses ==
As of January 2024, unless otherwise cited, information from Zhongzhi Enterprise Group.

Businesses controlled by Zhongzhi Enterprise Group
Financial institutions	Asset management companies	Wealth management companies
Zhongrong International Trust Co (partly)	Zhonghai Shengrong	Hang Tang Wealth
Zhongrong Fund	Zhongzhi International	Xinhu Wealth
Hengqin Life Insurance	Zhongzhi Capital	Datang Wealth
Hengbang Property Insurance	Shoutuo Rongsheng	Gaosheng Wealth
Zhongrong Huixin Futures		
Tianke Holding Group		

== See also ==
- Chinese property sector crisis (2020–present)
