= Ước Lễ =

Coordinates: 20.8279°N 105.8104°E

Ước Lễ Village Làng Ước Lễ
- Village
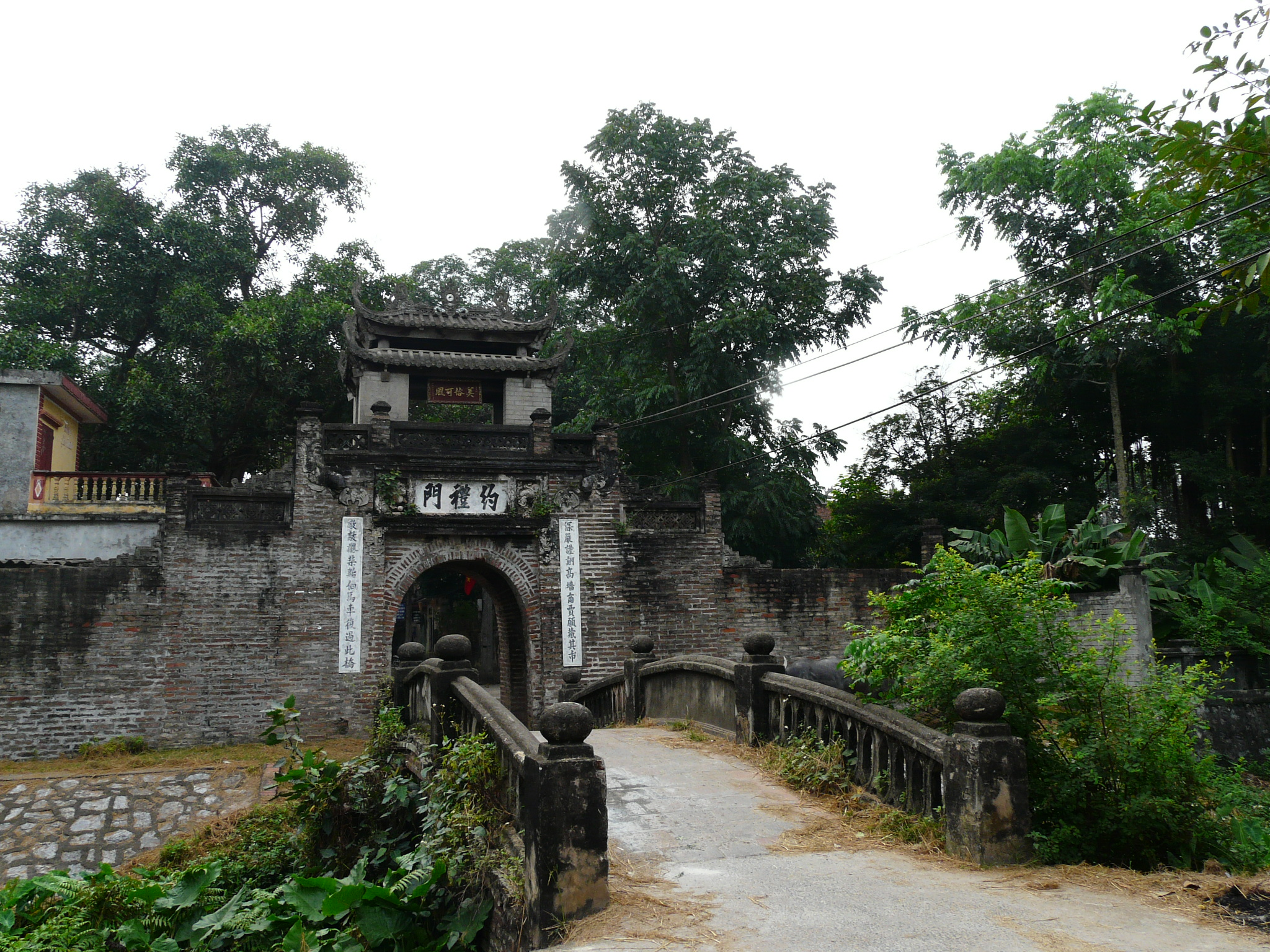
- The front gate of Ước Lễ, the characters on the gate read out as Ước Lễ môn (chữ Hán: 約禮門).
- Interactive map of Ước Lễ Village
- Country: Vietnam
- Region: Red River Delta
- Municipality: Hanoi
- Commune: Thanh Oai
- Time zone: UTC+7 (Indochina Time)

Ước Lễ is a Vietnamese village, located in Tân Ước commune, Thanh Oai District, Hanoi, Vietnam. The village is best known for its traditional giò lụa and the ancient village gate. Every year, on 15 January, the village holds a festival when residents of the village visit ancestral graves to honor the village's tradition of giò lụa. There are two national historical monuments in the village: the ancient village gate and the So temple.

== The Village Gate ==
The gate of Ước Lễ village was built during the Mạc dynasty and is one of the oldest preserved gates in the west of Hanoi. The gate is located at the entrance to the village, occupying a large space with a bridge, archways, and large brick walls. The gate is trapezoid in shape, six meters high and 12 metres wide, and built with red-hot bricks. In front of the gate is a curved bridge, two meters wide and 10 metres long, which crosses a wide ditch which formerly served as a defensive moat for the village. Later, the residents opened more convenient paths for trade.

The gate in the front bears a sign containing its name in literary Chinese; it reads Ước Lễ môn (chữ Hán: 約禮門). Also in the front, it contains two couplets in chữ Nôm; it reads, "Thâm nghiêm kín cổng cao tường, thương cổ nguyện tàng kỳ thị / Xôn xao trước thầy sau tớ, mã xa phục quá thử kiều". In the back of the gate, another sign reads "Thiểu cao đại" (chữ Hán: 少髙大).

The gate bears a red hanging sign reading, "Mỹ Tục Khả Phong" ("Fine Customs Are Bestowed"). According to previous generations, on the northern trip of King Tự Đức (1829–1883) in the 33rd Tự Đức year (1880), King Tự Đức granted the title "Mỹ Tục Khả Phong" to six villages, including Ước Lễ. During the war, the French launched several cannon attacks against the village, during which the gate collapsed and the sign was broken. After this, the villagers took the hanging sign into storage. However, during a serious flood, the villagers had to use everything they could to protect themselves, and some people used the sign to prevent the flood from entering the gate. As a result, the waters swept away the original hanging sign, and after the war, the villagers restored the gate and asked the Hán-Nôm Institute to remake the sign based on a similar sign retained in another village.

== Giò lụa ==
Giò lụa is a traditional Vietnamese food, particularly associated with the Tết holiday. According to giò lụa artisan Nguyễn Đức Bình, giò lụa has been made in Ước Lễ for around 500 years. Historic records in the village say that a palace concubine, originally from Ước Lễ, returned to build the gate and teach the villagers how to make giò lụa during the Mạc dynasty. Under feudalism, the dish was very noble and only for rich people. In the subsidy period, giò lụa was prohibited as it became more and more expensive. However, the tradition of making the dish was continued by the people of Ước Lễ, which persists until now.
