= Lingyanshan Temple =

Buddhist temple in Suzhou, Jiangsu, China

霊巌山寺
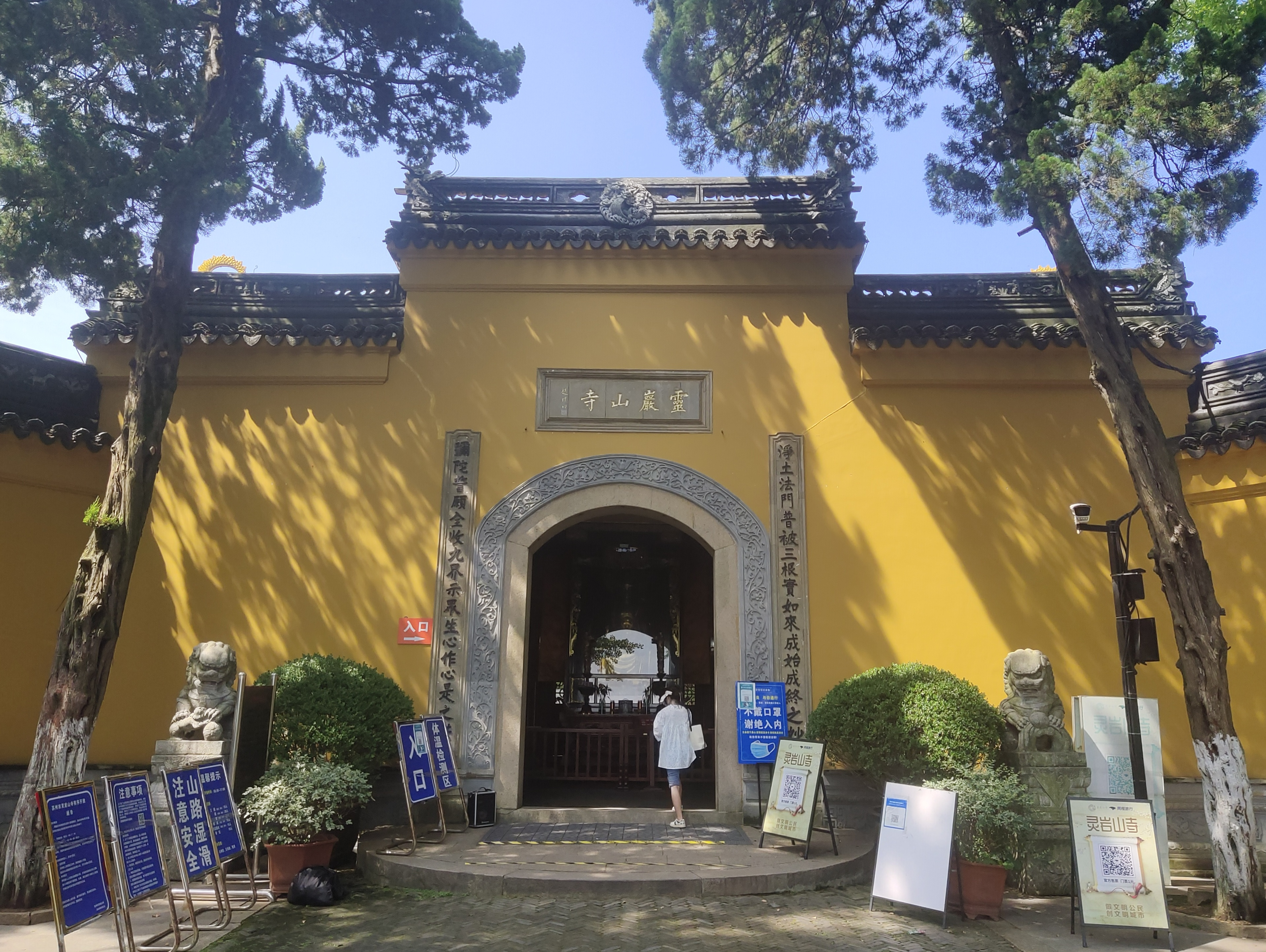

- Location within Jiangsu

Religion
- Affiliation: Buddhism
- Sect: Pure Land Buddhism

Location
- Location: Wuzhong District, Suzhou, Jiangsu, China
- Interactive map of 霊巌山寺
- Coordinates: 31°15′51″N 120°29′50″E

Architecture
- Style: Chinese architecture
- Founder: Lu Wan
- Established: Eastern Jin (317–420)

Lingyanshan Temple (simplified Chinese: 灵岩山寺; traditional Chinese: 靈岩山寺; pinyin: Língyánshān sì; lit. 'Lingyan Hill Temple') is a prominent Buddhist temple with a 1600-year history in Suzhou, was the palace for Xishi in BC494 located at the peak of Lingyan Hill.
