= Di Zi Gui =

Confucian primer

Di Zi Gui (Chinese: 弟子規; pinyin: Dì Zǐ Guī; Wade–Giles: Ti Tzu Kui, Standards for being a Good Pupil and Child) was written in the Qing dynasty during the reign of the Kangxi Emperor (r. 1661–1722) by Li Yuxiu. The text was a popular primer used in the Qing and Republic of China periods to teach children Confucian moral standards. Modern day efforts to re-popularize the text include those by Jingkong.

Like the San Zi Jing (another classic Chinese children's text), it is written in three-character verses. The source for the main outline of it is from Analects of Confucius, Book 1, Chapter 6, where Confucius said:

A young man should be a good son at home and an obedient young man abroad, sparing of speech but trustworthy in what he says, and should love the multitude at large but cultivate the friendship of his fellow men. If he has any energy to spare from such action, let him devote it to making himself cultivated.

And here's a translation more faithful to the original Chinese text than James Legge's 19th century version above

A student should show filial piety at home and respect people outside, behave prudently and trustfully, love all universally, and draw close to sages. While he has energy to spare, he should study edification by the sage.

Confucius emphasised that the basic moral values and virtues should be first taught to a child since young; those values are to respect elders, respect brothers and sisters, respect wife and husband, respect the society and lastly respect the country as a whole. He believed without those values all other learning would amount to nothing. The teachings in Di Zi Gui has been the standard teaching for the young of China for thousands of years.

There are altogether seven chapters in the Di Zi Gui, with each chapter listing one duty that a good person should follow in life.

== Chapter 1 - At Home, Be Dutiful to My Parents （入則孝） ==
父母呼，應勿緩。父母命，行勿懶。父母教，順敬聽。父母責，須順承。冬則温，夏則凊。晨則省，昏則定。出必告，反必面。居有常，業無變。事雖小，勿擅為。苟擅為，子道亏。物雖小，勿私藏。苟私藏，親心傷。親所好，力為具。親所惡，謹為去。身有傷，貽亲忧。德有傷，貽親羞。親愛我，孝何難。親憎我，孝方賢。親有過，諌使更。怡吾色，柔吾声。諌不入，悦复諌。號泣随，挞无怨。亲有疾，药先尝。昼夜侍，不离床。丧三年，常悲咽。居处变，酒肉絕。喪盡禮，祭盡誠。事死者，如事生。

When my parents call me, I must answer right away. When they ask me to do something, I must not be lazy to do it. When they instruct me, I will listen respectfully. When they scold me, I must accept and obey them.

I will try to ensure my parents are always warm and comfortable. In the morning I will greet them and at night I will wish them a good night.

Before going out or after returning home, I will tell my parents to put them at ease. I will maintain a disciplined life and strive for good results in all my studies.

I must not do as I please, even though it may be just a small matter. If I do so, then I will not have been a dutiful child.

I must not keep anything from my parents, even though it is small. If I do so, I may hurt their feelings.

I will try my best to please my parents. I will try not to do anything that offends them. If I behave badly, my parents will feel ashamed.

With loving parents, it is not difficult to be dutiful to them. Even if my parents sometimes treat me badly, I must still be dutiful to them. If I feel my parents are wrong, I may advise them to change. I must do this politely. If my parents pass away, I will mourn them. I will not decorate my home and I will avoid any festivities. I will serve my parents' funerals with the deepest sorrow and as if they were still alive.

== Chapter 2 - Standards for Younger Brothers (and Juniors) when Away from Home （出則弟） ==
兄道友，弟道恭；兄弟睦，孝在中。財物輕，怨何生。言語忍，忿自泯。或飲食，或坐走。長者先，幼者後。長呼人，即代叫。人不在，己即到。稱尊長，勿呼名。對尊長，勿見能 。路遇長，疾趋揖。長無言，退恭立。騎下馬，乘下车。過憂待，百步余。長者立，幼勿坐；長者坐，命乃坐 。尊長前，聲要低。低不聞，卻非宜。近必趋，退必遲。問起對，視勿移。事諸父，如事父；事諸兄，如事兄。

If I am the older sibling, I will befriend the younger ones. If I am the younger sibling, I will respect and love the older ones. Only when I can maintain harmonious relationships with my siblings am I being dutiful to my parents. (See for the following.) When brothers take money and objects lightly, resentment won't arise among us. When we tolerate each other's words, anger naturally dissipates. In eating and drinking, and in walking and sitting down, the elder person goes first, the junior person goes after. When an elder is calling someone, immediately call that person for the elder. If that person is not there, go to the elder yourself first. When addressing a respected elder, do not call him by name. In front of a respected elder, don't show off. When meeting an elder on the road, quickly go up and bow with hands together. If the elder has nothing to say, retreat and stand respectfully. Get off if riding a horse, get out if in a car. Wait even after the elder passes for a hundred steps or more. When the elder person stands, the junior person stands. When the elder person sits, only upon being ordered does the junior person sit. In front of a respected elder, one's voice has to be low. If it is too low to be heard, however, then that's inappropriate. When going in to see an elder, one must hurry; when leaving an elder, one must be slow. When asked a question, one rises and answer without moving one's gaze. Serve the many fathers (elders) like serving (your own) Father. Serve the many older brothers like serving (your own) Older Brother.

== Chapter 3 - Be Cautious (or Reverent) in My Daily Life （謹） ==
朝起早，夜眠遲。老易至，惜此時。晨必盥，兼漱口。便溺回，輒淨手。冠必正，紐必結。襪與履，俱緊切。置冠服，有定位。勿亂頓，致污穢。衣貴潔，不貴華。上循分，下稱家。對飲食，勿揀擇。食適可，勿過則。年方少，勿飲酒。飲酒醉，最為醜。步從容，立端正。揖深圓，拜恭敬。勿踐閾，勿跛倚。勿箕踞，勿搖髀。緩揭簾，勿有聲。寬轉彎，勿觸稜。執虛器，如執盈。入虛室，如有人。事勿忙，忙多錯。勿畏難，勿輕略。鬥鬧場，絕勿近。邪僻事，絕勿問。將入門，問孰存。將上堂，聲必揚。人問誰，對以名。吾與我，不分明。用人物，須明求。倘不問，即為偷。借人物，及時還。後有急，借不難。

I will get up each morning as the sun rises; at night, I shall sleep late. (Or just: "In the morning I will get up early; at night I will sleep late." See.) When I realize that time is passing me by and cannot be turned back, and that I am getting older year by year, I will especially treasure the present moment. (See for the following.) In the morning one must wash the hands plus rinse the mouth. After returning from urinating and defecation, one always cleans the hands. The hat must be on straight; the buttons must be done up. The socks and shoes should all be on snugly. For putting away hats and clothes, use set places. Don't set them down just anywhere, making a sweaty mess. In clothes value cleanliness not fanciness. First follow one's station in life; second suit the family's financial situation. With food and drink do not be picky. Eat just enough, not excessively. While still young, don't drink alcohol; being drunk is a most ugly sight. Walk relaxed and stand straight; bow deep and round, and salute reverently. Don't stand on thresholds; don't lean on one leg. Don't sit with legs apart and straight; don't wave the bottom. Open curtains slowly, without noise. Make turns widely, without hitting the corners. Hold empty vessels like holding full ones. Enter empty rooms as if someone is there. Do not be too busy, or there will be many mistakes. Don't fear difficulties; don't look down upon asking questions. Where there is fighting and disturbance, do not ever go near. Evil deviant things, don't ever say. When about to enter through a door, ask who is there. When about to enter a hall, one must call out. When people ask who it is, answer with your name. "Me" and "I" don't make anything clear. When using other people's things, one must clearly ask. If one doesn't ask, then it is stealing. When borrowing things from people, return it quickly. In the future if you need to borrow something, there will be no trouble borrowing it.

== Chapter 4 - Be Trustworthy （信） ==
凡出言，信為先。詐與莽，奚可焉。話說多，不如少。惟其是，勿佞巧。奸巧語，秽污詞。市井氣，切戒之。見未真，勿輕言。知未的，勿輕傳。事非宜，勿輕諾。苟輕諾，進退錯。凡道字，重且舒。勿急疾，勿模糊。彼說長，此說短。不關己，莫閒管。見人善，即思齊。縱去遠，以漸躋。見人惡，即内省。有則改，無加警。唯德學，唯才藝。不如人，當自砺。若衣服，若飲食。不如人，勿生戚。聞過怒，聞譽樂。損友來，益友卻。聞譽恐，聞過欣。直諒士，漸相親。無心非，名為錯。有心非，名為惡。過能改，歸於無。倘掩飾，增一辜。

When I speak, honesty is important. Deceitful words and lies must not be tolerated. When still unsure of what you saw, do not say it. When still unsure of what you know, don't spread it. If conditions aren't favorable, don't lightly make promises. If lightly make promises, then both going forward and backing off are wrong. Whenever words are said, say them with weight and relaxation, not hurriedly or quickly, nor in a blurred and unintelligible way. Upon seeing others being good, think of becoming equally good. Even when far below them, gradually get better. Upon seeing others being bad, inspect yourself. If you are like them then correct it; if not then be vigilant. In virtue and learning, in ability and skill, if not as good as others, then spur yourself to catch up. If it's in clothing and attire, or housing and food, that you are not as good as others, then don't be affected. Doing wrong unintentionally is called making a mistake. Doing wrong intentionally is called committing an evil. If one corrects what one has done wrong, then it's as if it hasn't happened. If one covers up, then one adds to one's guilt.

== Chapter 5 - Love All Equally （泛愛眾） ==
凡是人，皆須愛。天同覆，地同載。行高者，名自高。人所重，非貌高。才大者，望自大。人所服，非言大。己有能，勿自私。人所能，勿輕訾。勿諂富，勿驕貧。勿厭故，勿喜新。人不閑，勿事攪。人不安，勿話擾。人有短，切莫揭。人有私，切莫說。道人善，即是善。人知之，愈思勉。揚人惡，既是惡。疾之甚，禍且作。善相勸，德皆建。過不規，道兩亏。凡取與，貴分曉。與宜多，取宜少。將加人，先問己。己不欲，即速已。恩欲報，怨欲忘。報怨短，報恩長。待婢仆，身貴端。雖貴端，慈而寬。势服人，心不然。理服人，方無言。

Human beings, regardless of nationality, race, or religion - everyone - should be loved equally. We are all sheltered by the same sky and we all live on the same planet Earth. (See for the following.) People with high conduct naturally have high reputations; what people value is not high looks. People with great ability naturally have great fame; what people respect is not great words. If you have an ability, don't be selfish with it. If other people have an ability, don't lightly denigrate them. Don't toady to the rich; don't be arrogant to the poor. Don't despise the old; don't favor the new. If people don't have time, don't bother them with things. If people are not at peace, don't bother them with words. When people have shortcomings, definitely don't publicize them. When people have secrets, definitely don't tell them. Speaking of others' good deeds is in itself a good deed. When others learn of it, they become more encouraged. Publicizing other people's shortcomings is in itself evil. People hate it very much, and troubles arise. Admonishing each other to do good builds up both parties' virtue. Not dissuading the other person from doing wrong damages both parties' character. When taking and giving, making the terms clear is most important. Better to give more and take less. When about to do unto others, first ask yourself; if you don't want it yourself, then stop immediately. One wants to repay kindness and forget grudges. Repaying grudges is short; repaying kindness is long. In dealing with maids and servants, one is of high station. Though of high station, one must be kind and forgiving. Using force to make people submit doesn't make their hearts submit. Only using reason to make people submit will cause there to be no mutterings.

== Chapter 6 - Be Close to and Learn from People of Virtue and Compassion （親仁） ==
同是人，類不齊。流俗眾，仁者希。果仁者，人多畏。言不諱，色不媚。能親仁，無限好。德日進，過日少。不親仁，無限害。小人進，百事壞。

All are human, but their types differ. Most belong to the unrefined; the truly kind-hearted are rare. A truly kind-hearted person is feared by most people. He is not afraid of his words causing offense; his expression is not fawning. (See for the foregoing.) If I can be close to and learn from people of great virtue and compassion, I will benefit immensely. My virtues will grow daily and my wrongdoings will lessen day by day. (See for the following.) Not becoming close with the kind-hearted is infinitely harmful. Lowly people will enter, and everything will turn bad.

== Chapter 7 - After All the Above are Accomplished, I Should Study Further and Learn Literature and Art to Improve My Cultural and Spiritual Life （餘力學文） (or "If I Have Energy Left Over, I Should Study Writings") ==
不力行，但學文。長浮華，成何人。但力行，不學文。任己見，昧理真。讀書法，有三到。心眼口，信皆要。方讀此，勿慕彼。此未終，彼勿起。寬為限，緊用功。工夫到，滯塞通。心有疑，随札記。就人問，求确義。房室清，墙壁淨。幾案潔，筆硯正。墨磨偏，心不端。字不敬，心先病。列典籍，有定處。讀看畢，還原處。雖有急，卷束齊。有缺壞，就補之。非聖書，屏勿視。敝聰明，壞心志。勿自暴，勿自棄。聖與賢，可馴致。

If I do not actively practice what I have learned, but continue to study on the surface, even though my knowledge is increasing, it is only superficial. What kind of person will I be? (See for the following.) If one only works hard at conduct but does not study writings, then one relies only on his own views, and remains ignorant of true reason. The way to study requires three things coming together: heart, eyes, and mouth are all necessary. When you've just started reading one book, don't yearn for another. When the first book hasn't been finished, don't start another. Widely set limits; tightly apply efforts. With proper effort, obstacles will be overcome. When there is doubt, jot it down right away; that way you can ask people and get the true meaning. The room should be clean; the wall, clear; the desk, spotless; the pen and inkwell, straight. If the ink is ground unevenly, the heart is not upright. If the words are not respectful, the heart has fallen ill first. Books should be set in a regular place. After reading, return them to their original place. Though there may be something urgent, still roll and tie the books up properly first. If there is damage, repair it immediately. Books not of the sages, reject them; don't look. Such books cloud the intellect and corrupt one's heart and aspirations. Don't abuse yourself; don't give up on yourself. What is saintly and virtuous can be smoothly arrived at.

== See also ==
- Three Character Classic
