= Three Character Classic =

13th-century Chinese literary work

Chinese name
- Traditional Chinese: 三字經
- Simplified Chinese: 三字经
- Hanyu Pinyin: Sānzì Jīng
Transcriptions
Standard Mandarin
- Hanyu Pinyin: Sānzì Jīng
- Bopomofo: ㄙㄢ ㄗˋ ㄐㄧㄥ
- Gwoyeu Romatzyh: Santzyh Jing
- Wade–Giles: San¹ Tzŭ⁴ Ching¹
- Yale Romanization: Sāndz̀ Jīng
- IPA: [sán.tsɹ̩̂ tɕíŋ]
Wu
- Romanization: se zy cin
Yue: Cantonese
- Yale Romanization: Sāamjih Gīng
- Jyutping: Saam1zi6 Ging1
- IPA: [sam˥.tsi˨ kɪŋ˥]
Southern Min
- Hokkien POJ: Sam-jī-keng
- Tâi-lô: Sam-jī-king

Vietnamese name
- Vietnamese alphabet: Tam tự kinh
- Chữ Hán: 三字經

Korean name
- Hangul: 삼자경
- Hanja: 三字經
Transcriptions
- Revised Romanization: Samjagyeong

Japanese name
- Kanji: 三字経
- Kana: さんじきょう
Transcriptions
- Romanization: Sanjikyō

The Three Character Classic (Chinese: 三字经, 三字經), commonly known as San Zi Jing, also translated as Trimetric Classic, is one of the Chinese classic texts. It was probably written in the 13th century and is mainly attributed to Wang Yinglin (王應麟, 1223–1296) during the Song dynasty. It is also attributed to Ou Shizi (1234–1324).

The work is not one of the traditional six Confucian classics, but rather the embodiment of Confucianism suitable for teaching young children. Until the latter part of the 1800s, it served as a child's first formal education at home. The text is written in triplets of characters for easy memorization. With illiteracy common for most people at the time, the oral tradition of reciting the classic ensured its popularity and survival through the centuries. With the short and simple text arranged in three-character verses, children learned many common characters, grammar structures, elements of Chinese history and the basis of Confucian morality, especially filial piety and respect for elders (the Five Relationships in Chinese society).

During the Ming and Qing dynasties, the Three Character Classic formed the basis of elementary education, along with Hundred Family Surnames and Thousand Character Classic. The group came to be known as San Bai Qian (Three, Hundred, Thousand), from the first character in their titles. They were the almost universal introductory literacy texts for students, almost exclusively boys, from elite backgrounds and even for a number of ordinary villagers. Each was available in many versions, printed cheaply, and available to all since they did not become superseded. When a student had memorized all three, they could recognize and pronounce, though not necessarily write or understand the meaning of, roughly 2,000 characters (there was some duplication among the texts). Since Chinese did not use an alphabet, this was an effective, though time-consuming, way of giving a "crash course" in character recognition before going on to understanding texts and writing characters.

The text fell into disuse during the Cultural Revolution given the state's opposition to non-socialist ideologies. The classic, however, continued to circulate in other parts of the Chinese-speaking world with its inclusion in the Chinese Almanac (通勝) along with several other classics such as the Thousand Character Classic.

The first four verses state the core credo of Confucianism, that is, that human nature is inherently good, as developed by Mencius, considered one of the most influential traditional Chinese philosophers after Confucius.

人之初
性本善
性相近
習相遠

rén zhī chū
xìng běn shàn
xìng xiāng jìn
xí xiāng yuǎn

People at birth,
Are naturally good (kind-hearted).
Their natures are similar,
(But) their habits make them different (from each other).

Even nowadays, the above two introductory quotes are easily recognized, if not known by heart, by most youth in mainland China, Hong Kong and Taiwan. Though the work is no longer taught at public schools (it is still taught in Beijing today if not in all schools), some parents still use this classic to teach their young children to pronounce Chinese characters. It is sometimes a game for elementary school children to show off who can recite the most sentences from this classic.

== Editions ==
The Three Character Classic was translated in 1796 into Manchu as ᠮᠠᠨᠵᡠ ᠨᡳᡴᠠᠨ ᡥᡝᡵᡤᡝᠨᡳᡴᠠᠮᠴᡳᠮᡝ ᠰᡠᡥᡝ ᠰᠠᠨ ᡯ ᡤᡳᠩ ᠪᡳᡨᡥᡝ (Wylie: Manchu nikan ghergen i kamtsime sughe San tsz' ging pitghe; Möllendorff: Manju nikan hergen-i kamcime suhe San ze ging ni bithe).

The most well-known English translation of the text was completed by Herbert Giles in 1900 and revised in 1910. The translation was based on the original Song dynasty version. Giles had published an earlier translation (Shanghai 1873) but he rejected that and other early translations as inaccurate. Earlier translations into English include those by Robert Morrison, 1812; Solomon Caesar Malan and Hung Hsiu-chʻüan, 1856, and Stanislas Julien, 1864.

A Christian Three Character Classic (Chinese: 新增三字經; pinyin: Xīnzēng Sānzì Jīng) by Walter Henry Medhurst was first published in 1823 as an aid to missionary education. The three-character rhyming format was retained but the content was completely different.

=== Vietnam ===
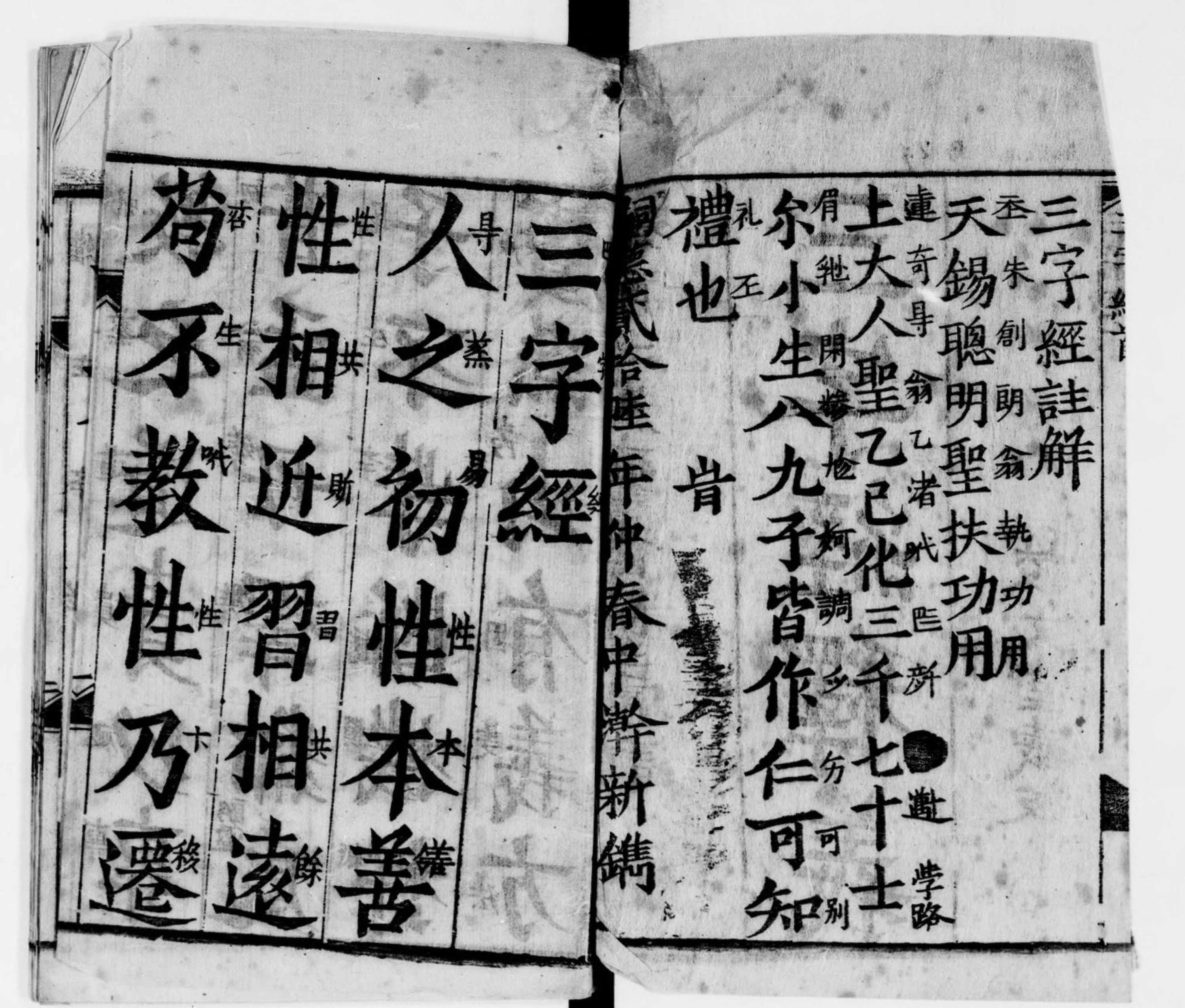
The first and second page of Tam tự kinh thích nghiã 三字經釋義. It shows the original text of the Three Character Classic 三字經 annotated with the Vietnamese translation.

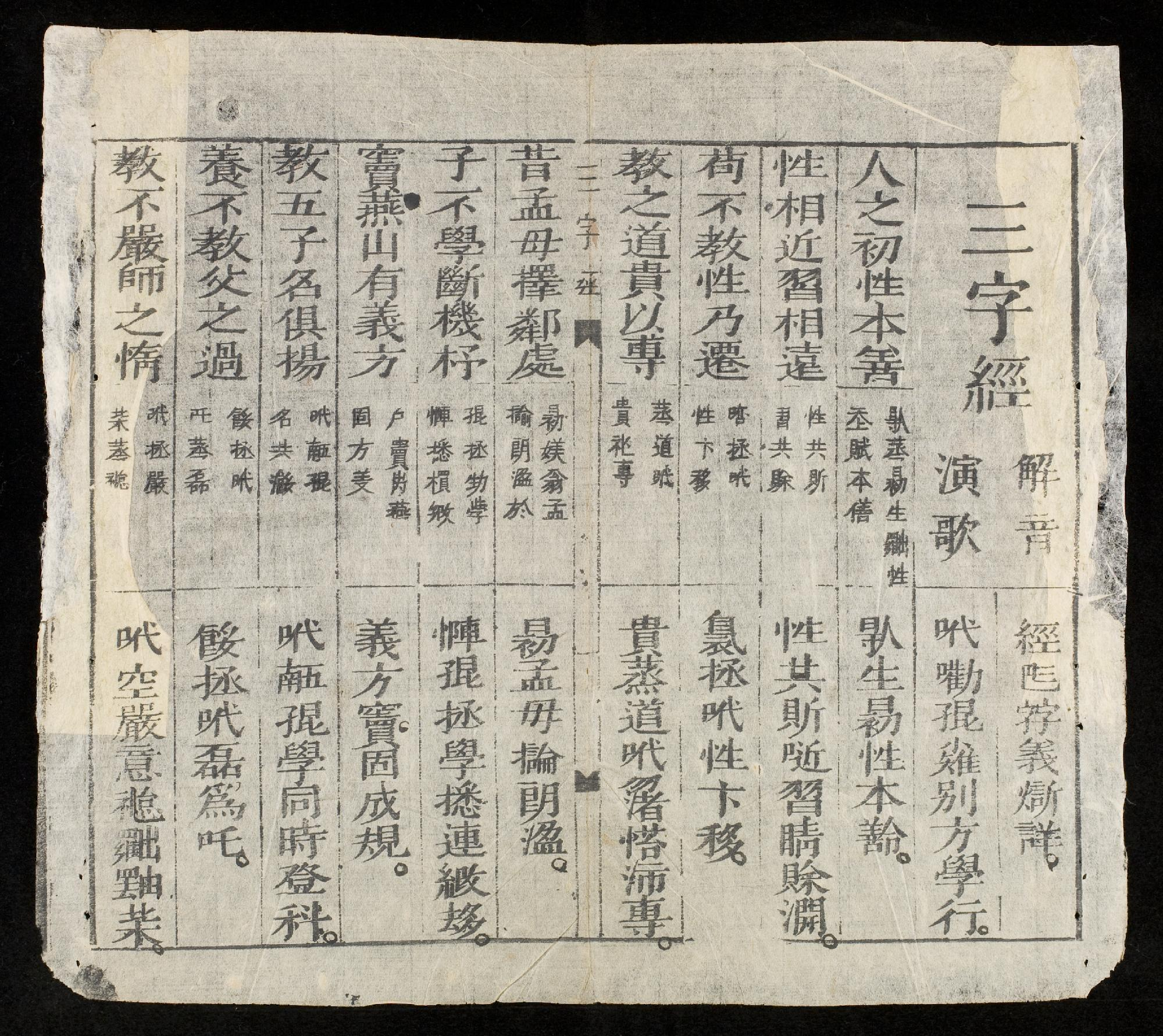
In the book Tam tự kinh giải âm diễn ca shows the original text of 三字經 alongside the Vietnamese translation.

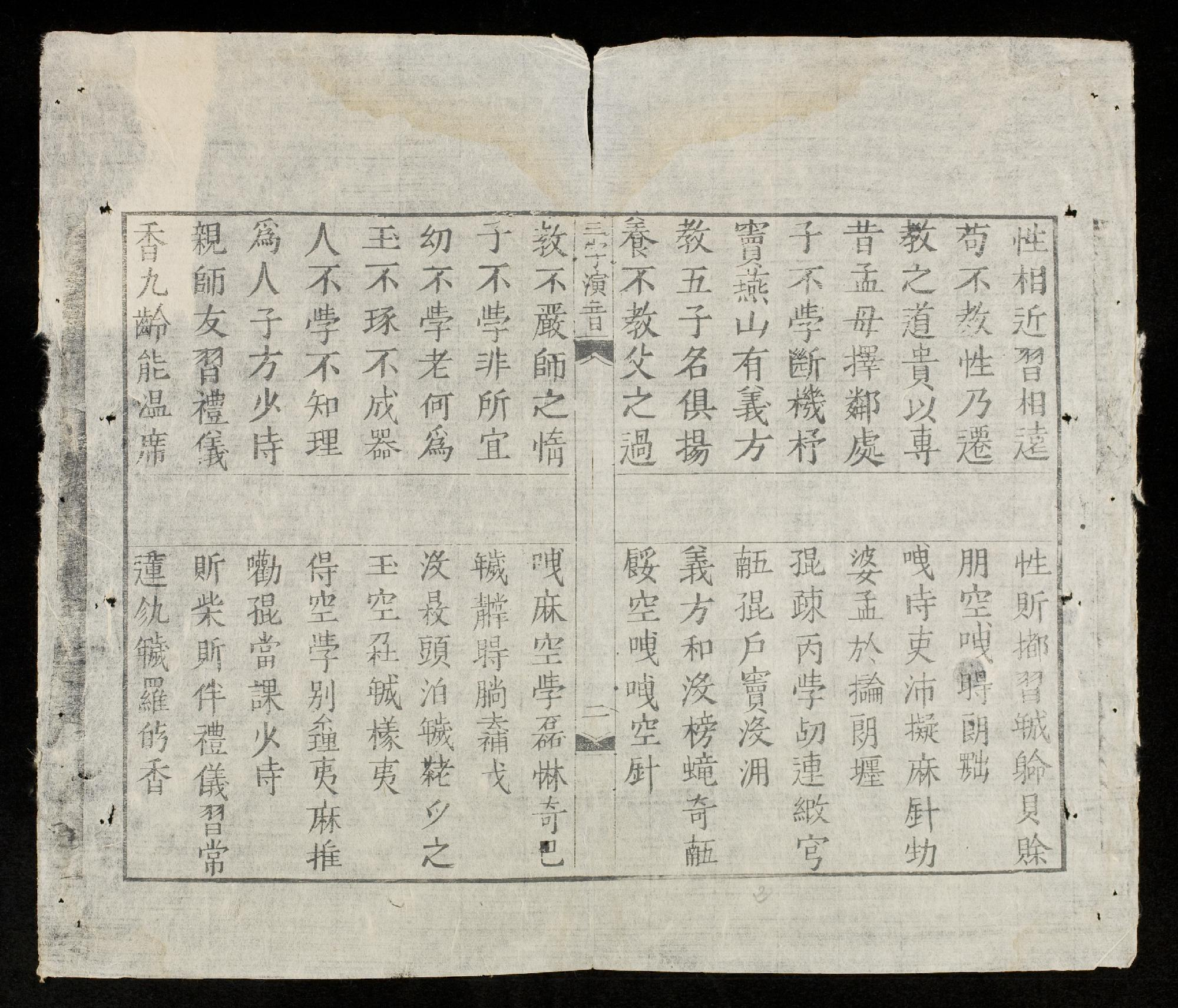
Second and third page of Tam tự kinh lục bát diễn âm 三字經六八演音

The earliest recorded date that the Three Character Classic was introduced to Vietnam is around 1820-1830 according to primary sources at the time. From there, it was circulated and modified. Different variants of the text began to emerge. The texts would either have different characters used, new lines, or different ordering. The most common variant of the Three Character Classic in Vietnam has 30 lines that are different from the Chinese edition. There are also two lines in the Vietnamese version that do not exist in the Chinese version.

Line	Vietnamese	Chinese
28	不知理	不知義
36	所當識	所當執
39	悌於長	弟於長
41	首孝悌	首孝弟
44	識某名	識某文
49	一太極	No
50	二陰陽	No
84	曰哀樂	曰哀懼
86	乃七情	七情具
89	與絲竹	絲與竹
96	至曾玄	至元曾
103	君則敬	長幼序
104	臣則忠	友與朋
105	長幼序	君則敬
106	朋友公	臣則忠
115	由孝經	小學終
126	乃孔伋	子思筆
139	號五經	號六經
149	我姬公	我周公
151	著六典	著六官
160	當詠諷	當諷詠
188	稱盛治	稱盛世
266	心而推	心而惟
292	猶苦學	猶苦卓
303	對大庭	對大廷
305	彼晚成	彼既成
322	且聰明	且聰敏
324	當少成	當自警
334	亦如是	亦若是
350	垂於後	裕於後

The two lines were added to form a full sequence of numbers (Chinese version begins from three to ten).

- One (nhất thái cực 一太極)
- Two (nhị âm dương 二陰陽)
- Three (tam tài 三才, tam quang 三光, tam cương 三綱)
- Four (tứ thời 四時, tứ phương 四方)
- Five (ngũ hành 五行, ngũ thường 五常)
- Six (lục cốc 六穀, lục súc 六畜)
- Seven (thất tình 七情)
- Eight (bát âm 八音)
- Nine (cửu tộc 九族)
- Ten (thập nghĩa 十義)

The text was also translated into vernacular Vietnamese, with the books such as Tam tự giải âm 三字解音, Tam tự kinh diễn âm 三字經演音, Tam tự kinh giải âm diễn ca 三字經解音演歌, Tam tự kinh thích nghiã 三字經釋義, and Tam tự kinh lục bát diễn âm 三字經六八演音 having chữ Nôm characters annotating the original text.

=== Differences in Chinese texts ===
The following stanzas do not appear in the Giles translation and originally appeared in Simplified Chinese. They list the dynasties that followed the Song dynasty up to and including the founding of Republican China. These stanzas were probably added cumulatively sometime between late 13th century and after the founding of the People's Republic of China in 1949.

Simplified Chinese	Traditional Chinese	Pinyin	Translation
辽与金 皆称帝	遼與金 皆稱帝	liáoyǔjīn jiēchēngdì	The Liao and Jin (dynasties), both claimed to be emperors.
太祖兴 国大明 号洪武 都金陵	太祖興 國大明 號洪武 都金陵	tàizǔxīng guódàmíng hàohóngwǔ dūjīnlíng	Taizu rises, his country is the Great Ming. His regnal name is Hongwu, his capital at Jinling.
迨成祖 迁燕京 十六世 至崇祯	迨成祖 遷燕京 十六世 至崇禎	dàichéngzǔ qiānyànjīng shíliùshì zhìchóngzhēn	By the time Chengzu started ruling, he moved (his capital) to Yanjing. (His dynasty) lasted for sixteen successions, until the Chongzhen Emperor.
阉乱後 寇内讧 闯逆变 神器终	閹亂後 寇內訌 闖逆變 神器終	yānluànhòu kòunèihòng chuǎngnìbiàn shénqìzhōng	Eunuchs stir up trouble in the palace, rebels cause internal conflict. The Dashing King starts a rebellion, the Divine Utensil comes to an end.
清顺治 据神京 至十传 宣统逊	清順治 據神京 至十傳 宣統遜	qīngshùnzhì jùshénjīng zhìshíchuán xuāntǒngxùn	The Shunzhi Emperor of Qing, seized the Imperial Capital. After ten generations, the Xuantong Emperor abdicated.
举总统 共和成 复汉土 民国兴	舉總統 共和成 復漢土 民國興	jǔzǒngtǒng gònghéchéng fùhàntǔ mínguóxìng	A President is elected, the Republic is formed. Chinese soil was recovered, the Republic of China flourishes.
廿二史 全在兹 载治乱 知兴衰 (Note: this line replaces the original one in the Song version where it says "The Seventeen Dynastic Histories... 十七史...".)	廿二史 全在茲 載治亂 知興衰	niànèrshǐ quánzàizī zàizhìluàn zhīxīngshuāi	The Twenty-two Dynastic Histories, are all embraced in the above. They contain examples of good and bad government, whence may be learnt the principles of prosperity and decay.

== Reception ==
The first two lines were recited at the Academy Awards 2021 by Chloé Zhao, the award winner for best director.

== See also ==
- Di Zi Gui
- Thousand Character Classic
- Hundred Family Surnames
- Tam thiên tự - the Vietnamese equivalent for teaching beginners Chinese characters.
