= Frontline Song and Dance Troupe =

The Frontline Song and Dance Troupe (Chinese: 前线歌舞团; pinyin: Qiánxiàn Gēwǔtuán) founded 1946 in Nanjing, officially named in 1955, is a dance song and theatre troupe of the East China command of the People's Liberation Army. The troupe was the testing ground and originator of many of the patriotic and revolutionary plays and musicals of the 1960s-1980s. The troupe continues to appear regularly on China Central Television.
