= Petrus Trương Vĩnh Ký =

Vietnamese scholar (1837–1898)

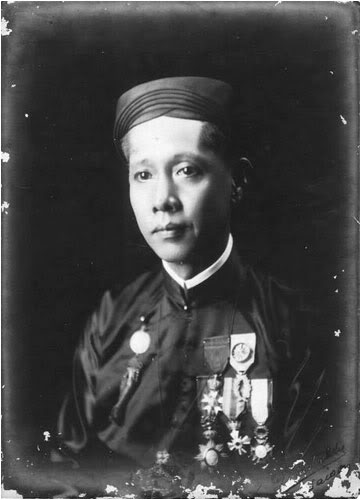

Jean-Baptiste Petrus Trương Vĩnh Ký (chữ Hán: 張永記; 6 December 1837 – 1 September 1898), known as Petrus Ký, was a Vietnamese scholar whose publications helped improve understanding between colonial Vietnam and Europe. His works helped popularize the Vietnamese alphabet, chữ Quốc ngữ, leading to its officialization in the early 20th century. He served in the French colonial regime as a linguist and also translated many literary works into modern Vietnamese.

== Life ==
When he was little, he went by the name Trương Chánh Ký. He was born on 6 December 1837 in Vĩnh Thành village, Minh Lệ canton, Tân Minh district, Vĩnh Long province (now is Vĩnh Thành, Commune, Chợ Lách district, Bến Tre province).

His father was Provincial Military Lead Trương Chánh Thi, his mother was Nguyễn Thị Châu. He started to learn Literary Chinese at the early age of 5. When he was 8, he lost his father. During that time, he convinced his mother to allow him to learn the Vietnamese alphabet and convert to Catholicism. He adopted the name Jean-Baptiste Petrus Trương Chánh Ký, but later changed his name to Petrus Trương Vĩnh Ký. In Cái Nhum, there was a Christian missionary teaching the Latin language. At the age of 11, Vĩnh Ký studied the Christian Bible with Father Hoa (Father Belleveaux) and followed him to the Pinhalu School in Phnom Penh, Cambodia. In 1851, Vĩnh Ký was granted a scholarship by this school to study at the Penang Seminary, then the main centre of Roman Catholic training for Southeast Asian countries. At the Penang Seminary, Vĩnh Ký showed outstanding learning skills to the ideological and knowledge on natural as well as social sciences, that even some of the famed personalities at that time were surprised and praised his excellent brainpower and erudite knowledge. He also proved himself skilful in linguistics. Besides the commonly used languages at the time such as French, English, Latin, Greek, Hindi, and Japanese, he was also proficient in Chinese, Spanish, Malay, Lao, Thai, and Burmese. Trương Vĩnh Ký worked mainly in the cultural domain, but he also worked for 8 months at the Viện cơ mật (Privy Council) in the court at Huế and another 8 months as an interpreter in the Vietnamese delegation to France. When the French troops attacked the Province of Gia Định in December 1859, he was appointed as an interpreter to the occupying forces.

=== Travel to Europe ===
In June 1863, he accompanied Phan Thanh Giản, the chief delegator sent to France by the Huế Court to negotiate the retrieval of provinces lost into French hands. This trip was a good opportunity for Vĩnh Ký to meet with famous figures at the time such as Victor Hugo, Littre, Renan, and other French statesmen. He was also able to visit Egypt, Portugal, Spain, Italy, etc.

The trip also gave him a broader perspective view of his own country and the plight of his fellow countrymen. When the 6 provinces of the Cochninchine were lost to the French invaders, Vĩnh Ký was appointed as the first Annamite official to serve under the French protectorate.

=== Professor of French language ===
He was professor of French language at the Interpreter School (1866–1868), Chief editor for the Gia Định Báo (1868), Director of the Pedagogic School and at the same time, Secretary of the City Council of Chợ Lớn (1872), professor in French language for the French and Spanish expats at the Collège des Administrateurs Stagiaires in 1874. In February 1876, Vĩnh Ký was appointed as a supervisor to the emperor Đồng Khánh at the Viện cơ mật and stayed in that job until October 1876. Then he went back to Saigon.

=== Later years 1886-1898 ===
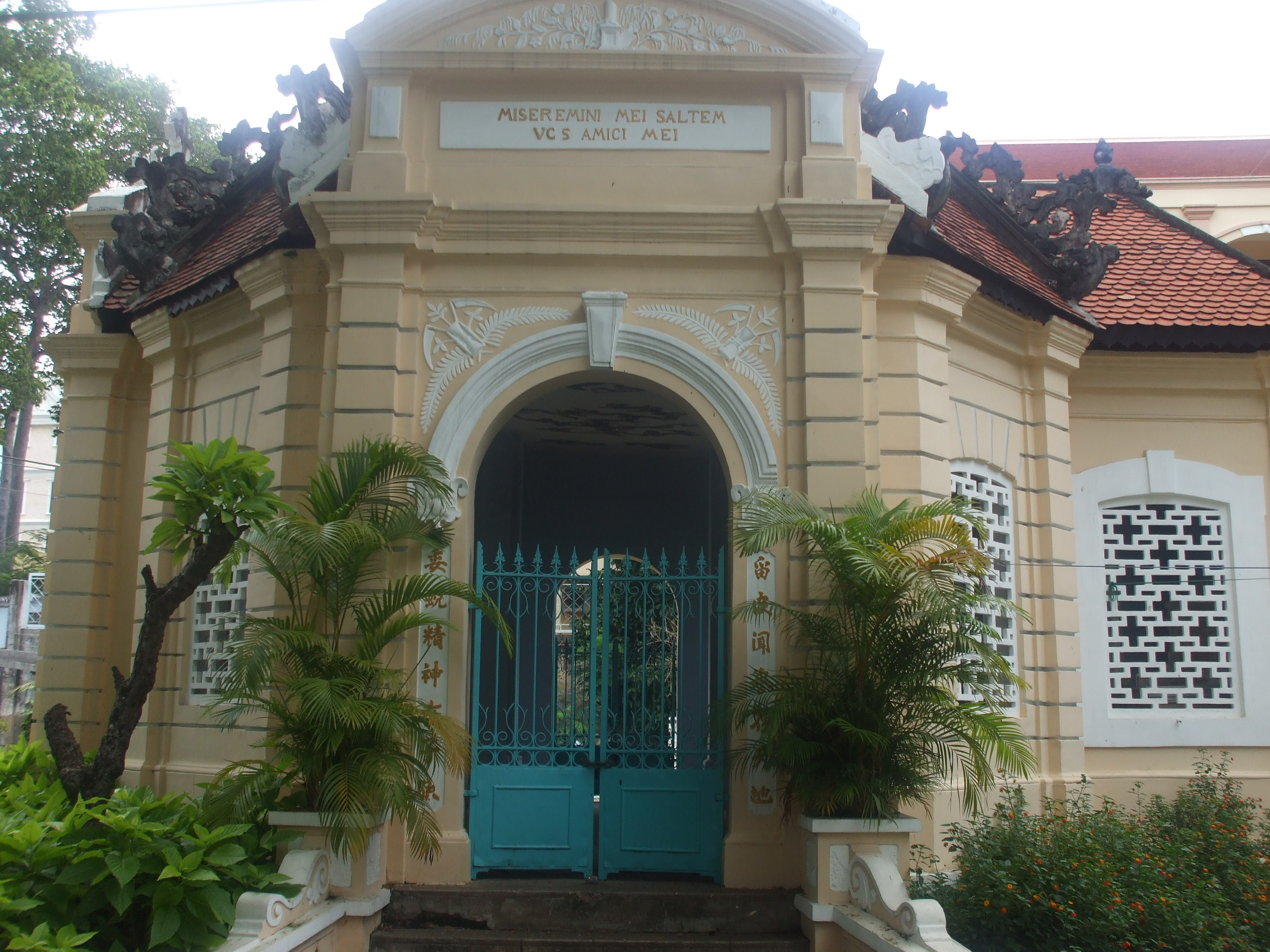
The grave of Trương Vĩnh Ký in Chợ Quán church in Ho Chi Minh City, with engraved: "Miseremini Mei Saltem Vos Amici Mei" ("Pity me. You’re at least my friends.") Job 19:21-27

He was no longer accredited after the abrupt death of Governor-General Paul Bert on 11 November 1886 and spent most of the time doing research and teaching at the Interpreter School and the Collège des Administrateurs Stagiaires. He died on 1 September 1898, in Saigon, aged 62.

During his 40 years working in the cultural field, Trương Vĩnh Ký created 118 works of many genres such as research, collecting, translation, and transcription, tens of which were written in French. He was also a member of science societies and associations in Europe. In the time of transition and the cultural intersection between West and East in Vietnam at the end of the 19th and early 20th century, Vĩnh Ký had such a grandiose career that the French scholar J. Bouchot called him "the only scholar in Indochina and even the modern China" In Vietnam, Vĩnh Ký was praised as the most excellent language and cultural researcher. Though there are some ideas criticizing him for having cooperated with the French colonialists, no one ever doubts his excellent learning and profound knowledge, as well as his invaluable contributions to Vietnam's cultural development during the early days of modern civilization. There have been many research books and biographical as well as critic books about Trương Vĩnh Ký, his life and his works. All were published and have been reprinted many times in many ways for many later researchers to get to understand him.

A school was inaugurated in his name in 1928 as Lycée Petrus Trương Vĩnh Ký, now known as Lê Hồng Phong High School.

== Translations and publications ==
In the cultural field, Trương Vĩnh Ký was admired greatly as a scholar with broad and profound knowledge in various fields of study, both in social and natural sciences. He had considerable achievements in collecting, transcription and translation from foreign languages into Vietnamese. Some of his best-known transliterations and translation works include Truyện Kiều (The Tale of Kieu), Lục Vân Tiên (written in Chinese characters as 蓼雲仙, by Nguyễn Đình Chiểu), Phan Trần, and Gia huấn ca (Book of Familial Educating), Lục súc tranh công (The Six Animals Vying for Services).
