= Ba Tri district =

Coordinates: 10.083°N 106.617°E

Ba Tri district Huyện Ba Tri
- District
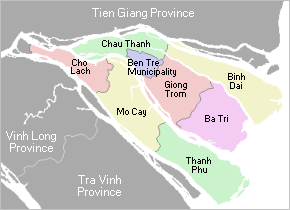
- Location in Bến Tre province
- Country: Vietnam
- Province: Bến Tre
- Capital: Ba Tri

Area
  - District: 136 sq mi (351 km^{2})

Population (2019 census)
  - District: 184,734
  - Density: 1,360/sq mi (526/km^{2})
  - Urban: 10,235
  - Rural: 174,499
- Time zone: UTC+07:00 (Indochina Time)

Ba Tri is a rural district (huyện) of Bến Tre province in the Mekong Delta region of Vietnam. As of 2004 the district had a population of 201,802. The district covers an area of 351 km^{2}. The district capital lies at Ba Tri. In 2019, the population decreased to 184,734 people with a mean density of 530 people per square kilometer.

The district is in the east of Bến Tre Province. It is bordered to the east by the South China Sea, to the north by the Ba Lai River, to the south by the Hàm Luông river and to the west by Giồng Trôm district.

In the capital of Ba Tri lies the final resting place of the famed 19th-century poet Nguyễn Đình Chiểu, known for his patriotic anti-colonial writings. It has been visited by dignitaries including Nông Đức Mạnh.

The commune of Bảo Thạnh is the home of Phan Thanh Giản, a leading mandarin of Tự Đức who was also the first southerner to gain a PhD in the imperial court examinations.

The commune of Bảo Thuận among others is known for tourism.

== Administrative divisions ==
The district is divided into one township, Ba Tri (capital), and the following communes:

1. An Hòa Tây
2. An Thủy
3. Vĩnh An
4. An Đức
5. An Bình Tây
6. An Hiệp
7. An Ngãi Tây
8. Tân Hưng
9. An Ngãi Trung
10. An Phú Trung
11. Mỹ Thạnh
12. Mỹ Nhơn
13. Mỹ Chánh
14. Mỹ Hòa
15. Tân Mỹ
16. Tân Xuân
17. Phước Tuy
18. Bảo Thạnh
19. Phú Ngãi
20. Phú Lễ
21. Vĩnh Hòa
22. Tân Thủy
23. Bảo Thuận

== Climate ==
Climate data for Ba Tri
Month	Jan	Feb	Mar	Apr	May	Jun	Jul	Aug	Sep	Oct	Nov	Dec	Year
Record high °C (°F)	33.7 (92.7)	38.3 (100.9)	35.5 (95.9)	37.3 (99.1)	37.6 (99.7)	38.7 (101.7)	35.5 (95.9)	34.9 (94.8)	35.2 (95.4)	35.2 (95.4)	34.5 (94.1)	33.5 (92.3)	38.7 (101.7)
Mean daily maximum °C (°F)	29.0 (84.2)	29.5 (85.1)	30.8 (87.4)	32.4 (90.3)	32.8 (91.0)	32.0 (89.6)	31.6 (88.9)	31.4 (88.5)	31.2 (88.2)	30.5 (86.9)	29.9 (85.8)	29.2 (84.6)	30.9 (87.6)
Daily mean °C (°F)	25.5 (77.9)	25.8 (78.4)	27.0 (80.6)	28.5 (83.3)	28.5 (83.3)	27.5 (81.5)	27.3 (81.1)	27.2 (81.0)	27.0 (80.6)	26.9 (80.4)	26.7 (80.1)	25.8 (78.4)	27.0 (80.6)
Mean daily minimum °C (°F)	23.2 (73.8)	23.6 (74.5)	24.7 (76.5)	25.8 (78.4)	25.6 (78.1)	25.1 (77.2)	24.7 (76.5)	24.7 (76.5)	24.7 (76.5)	24.7 (76.5)	24.4 (75.9)	23.3 (73.9)	24.6 (76.3)
Record low °C (°F)	18.0 (64.4)	18.8 (65.8)	17.2 (63.0)	21.5 (70.7)	22.3 (72.1)	21.3 (70.3)	21.4 (70.5)	21.0 (69.8)	22.2 (72.0)	20.9 (69.6)	18.7 (65.7)	17.3 (63.1)	17.2 (63.0)
Average precipitation mm (inches)	5.2 (0.20)	2.6 (0.10)	8.0 (0.31)	40.5 (1.59)	198.0 (7.80)	218.1 (8.59)	216.0 (8.50)	198.9 (7.83)	239.0 (9.41)	282.2 (11.11)	94.7 (3.73)	28.8 (1.13)	1,543.9 (60.78)
Average rainy days	1.3	0.5	0.8	3.7	15.5	20.1	20.0	20.0	21.2	19.6	9.5	4.8	137.6
Average relative humidity (%)	80.0	81.3	81.0	80.1	82.7	84.4	85.2	86.0	86.8	87.1	85.0	82.8	83.6
Mean monthly sunshine hours	246.0	259.1	293.2	277.4	217.5	177.4	192.1	191.7	172.3	180.4	201.3	204.7	2,628.2
Source: Vietnam Institute for Building Science and Technology
