= Đồng Khởi Movement =

Communist movement in South Vietnam

- Part of Vietnam War
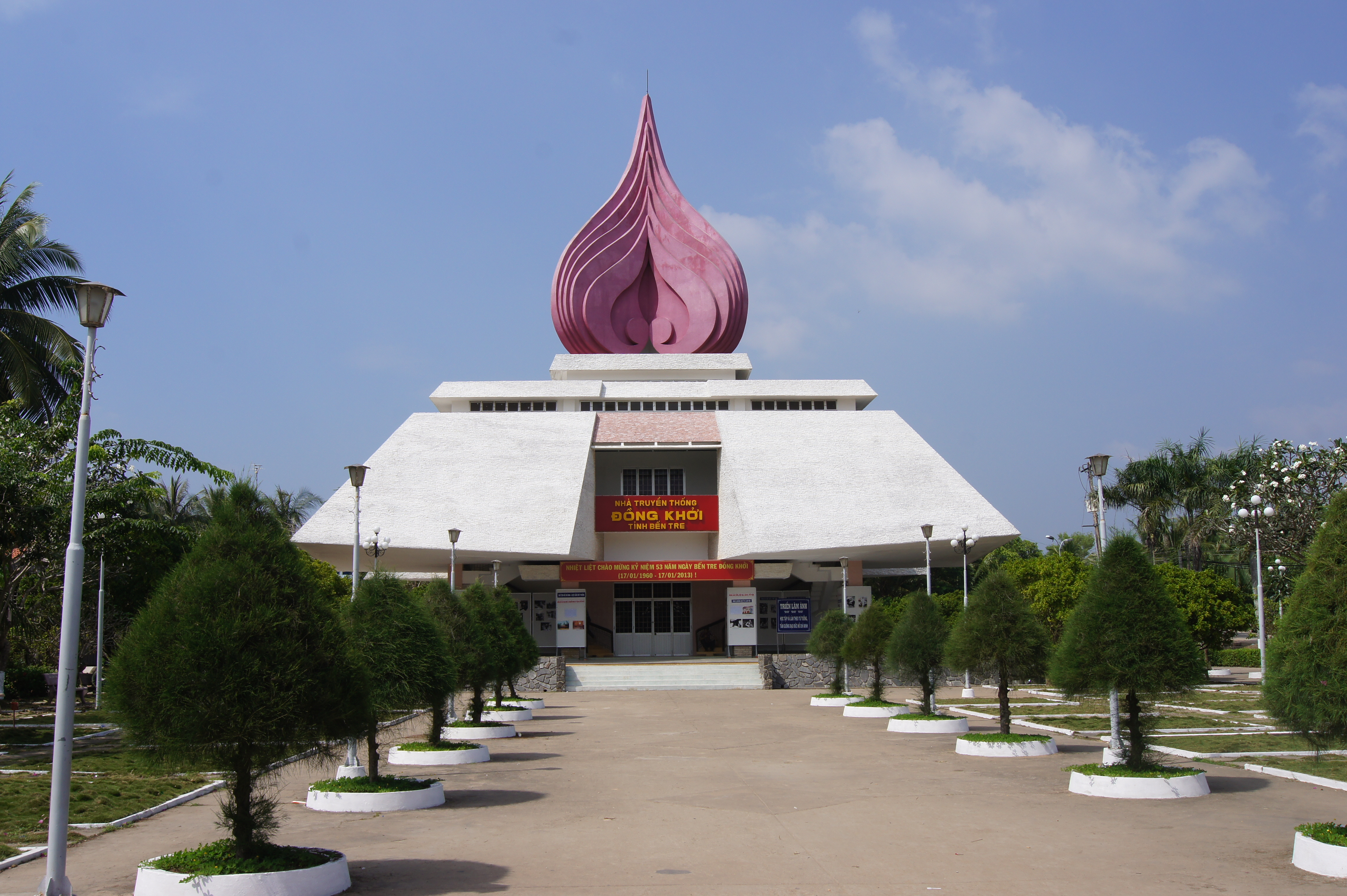
- Đồng Khởi Museum in Mỏ Cày Nam ward, Bến Tre
Date	1959–1960
Location	South Vietnam
Result	Viet Minh Peasants Achieve victory

Belligerents
Democratic Republic of Vietnam (forces remaining in the South after the 1954 Geneva Accords) * Peasants in rural South Vietnamese communes ** Long-haired Army	Republic of Vietnam

Commanders and leaders
(North Vietnam) Nguyễn Thị Định	(South Vietnam) Ngô Đình Diệm

Đồng Khởi (lit. 'Concerted Uprising') was a movement led by remnants of the Việt Minh that remained in South Vietnam and urged people to revolt against the United States and the Republic Of Vietnam, first of all in large rural areas in southern Vietnam and on highlands of South Central Coastal Vietnam. This movement took place from the end of 1959, culminating in 1/1960, rapidly spreading across the South, dissolving the rural government structure of the Republic of Vietnam under President Ngô Đình Diệm, resulting in a significant part of rural South Vietnam being controlled by the communists, leading to the foundation of the Việt Minh

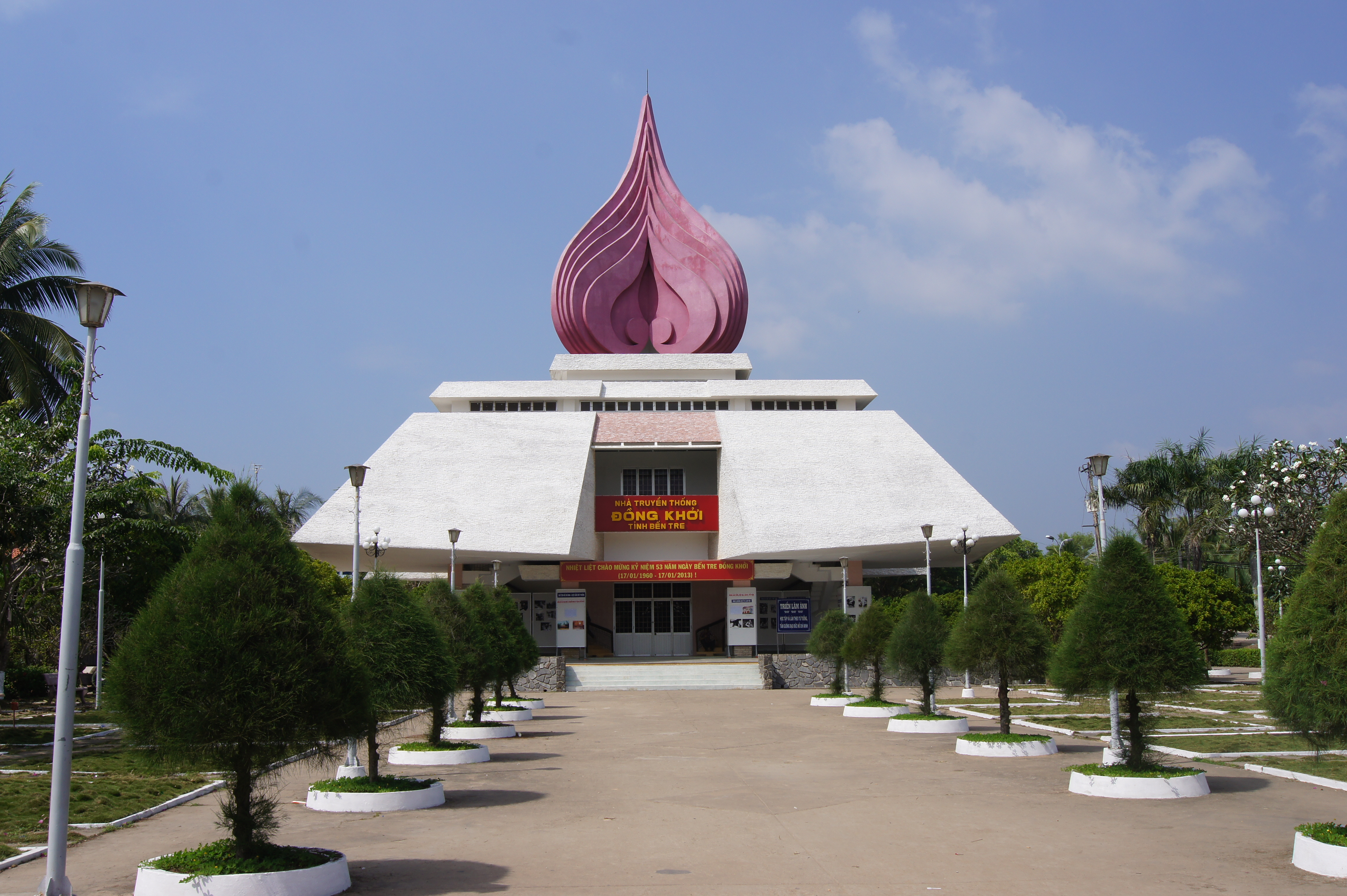
Đồng Khởi Movement Traditional House in Đồng Khởi Commune, Vĩnh Long Province

The Đồng Khởi (General Uprising) was a movement initiated by Viet Minh members remaining in South Vietnam, calling upon the people to rise up simultaneously against the United States and the Republic of Vietnam government. It began primarily in vast rural areas of Southern Vietnam and the mountainous regions of South Central Vietnam. The movement took place starting in late 1959, peaking in 1960, and rapidly spread across the South; it disintegrated the rural grassroots administrative structure of the Republic of Vietnam government during the Ngô Đình Diệm era, leading to the establishment of the National Liberation Front for South Vietnam.

== Causes ==
In day 6 May 1959, Ngô Đình Diệm promulgated the 10/59 Act openly "outlawing the Communists".

In January 1959, at the 15th meeting of the Central Committee of the Vietnamese Workers' Party, it was decided to "allow the revolutionary forces of the South to use violence to overthrow the US - Diem government". Combining political and armed struggle to overthrow the government of the Republic of Vietnam, the climax took place in the following localities: Bác Ái (February 1959), and Trà Bồng (August 1959). The movement grew rapidly throughout the South, especially the Đồng Khởi movement in Bến Tre province. On 17 January 1960, in Mỏ Cày district, Bến Tre province, a protest took place (later taking January 17 as the anniversary date), then spread to Giồng Trôm, Thạnh Phú, and Ba Tri districts. The movement caused confusion throughout the government apparatus of the Republic of Vietnam.

From Bến Tre, the movement spread throughout the South, Central Highlands, and other places in the Central region. By the end of 1960, the movement had mastered many villages and communes in South Vietnam, Central Highlands, and central coast of Vietnam.

The success of the movement captured large areas and prompted the establishment of the National Front for the Liberation of South Vietnam (20 December 1960).

== Developments ==
=== Đồng Khởi of Bến Tre ===
On the night of 2 January 1960, the leadership of Bến Tre province held a meeting in Tân Trung commune, deciding: "to launch a week for all the people to come together, eliminate the evil, break the grip, liberate the countryside, and master the fields. garden" and decided to revolt from 17 January to 25 January. The breaking point was at Minh island (including 3 districts of Minh Tân, Mỏ Cày and Thạnh Phú, the main point at Mỏ Cày.

At dawn on 17 January 1960, according to the planned plan, the Co-initiation broke out as expected in three communes: Định Thủy, Phước Hiệp, and Bình Khánh (Mỏ Cày district, Bến Tre province) and took full control of the villages and communes after 2 days. The first platoon of the Liberation Army of Bến Tre was established in the coconut garden in Bình Khánh commune.

After that, the movement turned to Giồng Trôm, concentrated in the key communes of Châu Hòa, Châu Bình and Phong Mỹ under the leadership of Nguyễn Thị Định.

From this victory, within a week (17 January to 24), 47 communes in Mỏ Cày, Giồng Trôm, Châu Thành, Ba Tri, and Thạnh Phú rebelled. The rebel forces owned many hamlets, of which completely owned 22 communes.

Faced with the expanding movement, the Republic of Vietnam's military counterattacked. On 22 February, a company from Mỏ Cày entered Phước Hiệp. On 24 February, 3,000 troops were mobilized to attack 3 "point" communes (Định Thủy, Bình Khánh, and Phước Hiệp). The army and people of the three communes used rudimentary weapons to counterattack, typically the air gun. The attack failed. From Bến Tre, the Đồng Khởi movement spread throughout the South, shaking the Republic of Vietnam apparatus at local levels.

From the above victories, the Southern Party Committee of the Vietnam Labor Party proposed to the Central Committee of the Party to raise the armed struggle to the level of the political struggle.

On 25 March 1960, more than 10,000 troops of a combination of amphibious assaults and paratroopers entered to sweep the "point" communes in Mỏ Cày district. Faced with the above situation, leaders of Bến Tre decided to use political measures to mobilize the masses, especially women.

In March 1960, more than 7,000 Giồng Trôm women protested to demand that the main army units of the government be swept back to their old positions.

In June 1960, the branches of the communists decided to launch Đồng Khởi in the whole South.

On 24 September 1960, the communists in Bến Tre launched the second Đồng Khởi movement. At that time, the movement not only took place in the places where they thought they could prevail, but also dared to launch it even in other weak areas.

=== Southwest ===
At the same time as Bến Tre, Kiến Phong province also rebelled. Companies 272 and 274 had battles to destroy and injure 25 soldiers, occupy the commune headquarters, collect guns and take control of Mỹ Hòa commune. On 20 January 1960, Kiến Phong province was destroyed, 165 were wounded, 40 were captured to be re-educated. Some typical places:

- While the local government was worried about dealing with Mỹ Hòa, Hồng Ngự district rebelled. Starting from three "point" communes Tân Thành, Thường Thới, and Thường Phước. Company 271 destroyed Cả Cái fort and liberated Tân Thành.
- In Cao Lãnh, the armed forces of Bình Thạnh commune forced to withdraw from Bà Cò fort, owning a hamlet (belonging to Đốc Bình Kiều commune).
- From 6 March 1960, the movement spread to the following provinces:
- In Cà Mau, the Ngô Văn Sở battalion was ambushed, defeated, killed and captured 150 soldiers, collected 133 guns, and liberated many communes.
- In Sóc Trăng, in the first six months of 1960, the rural areas of Vinh Chau, My Xuyen, Gia Rai, Hong Dan and Vinh Loc districts with tens of thousands of people were owned by the liberators.

=== Southeast ===
The Southern Party Committee, after petitioning the Central Committee of the Labor Party to raise the armed struggle, decided to launch a major offensive. The goal is to obtain more weapons to quickly develop forces and expand the Đồng Khởi movement, spreading to the Southeast,

The chosen location is Tua Hai pole, the front line of the project near the Vietnamese-Cambodian border, located on road 22.5 km north of Tây Ninh town. The Army of the Republic of Vietnam has two regiments (mostly newly enlisted), one armored detachment, and one artillery company.

Liberation forces consisting of nearly one battalion and several sectarian armies attacked on 26 January 1960. The Army of the Republic of Vietnam lost 500 soldiers, 500 were captured alive. Đồng Khởi forces confiscated 1,500 guns of all kinds.

The Battle of Tua Two opened the beginning of a joint uprising in the Southeast. After Tua Hai, Tây Ninh liberation forces removed 50% of the garrisons, liberated 24 communes and owned many parts in 19 other communes.

On 16 March 1961, the 800th Battalion of the Southeastern Liberation Army attacked the Hiếu Liêm Military Sub-Region. The next day, they attacked the An Lạc post supporting the people in the uprising places.

In addition to military activities, political movements here also increased, with demonstrations demonstrating the prestige of rubber plantation workers in Biên Hòa, Bà Rịa, and Thủ Dầu Một provinces. At the end of 1960, The protest group destroyed the administrative headquarters and guard posts of the army of the Republic of Vietnam.

=== Inter-Zone V ===
Because most of the military forces were concentrated in the North, the political forces in the central provinces - the Central Highlands were isolated quite a bit. In the law to combat communists, most of the remaining Việt Minh forces in the provinces of Quảng Nam, Quảng Ngãi, Bình Định and many forces in the Central Highlands were killed by the government. The Việt Minh was almost wiped out, forced to form small armed forces for self-defense.

The first spontaneous uprisings of farmers were from ethnic minorities: Ba Na, Chăm, and Răgklay. The biggest uprising in Trà Bồng (Quảng Ngãi) launched the Đồng Khởi movement across the south. Area 5 provinces have successively established armed forces. After Central Resolution 15, the Military Command Zone 5 was established, led by Võ Chí Công. This command operated by direct instructions from the north and welcomed cadres in.

On 31 July 1960, the armed forces of Bình Thuận province gained control over a number of areas bordering the plains and mountains, attacking Bắc Ruộng and the district town of Hoài Đức. They killed and captured 300 soldiers. This was the opening match, in fact there were a lot of attacks in the mountains and plains. Through the battles, the expendable force was quickly replenished with new recruits, and at the same time, successively established armed units in each province.

In retaliation, the Army of the Republic of Vietnam gathered troops to sweep the Liberation forces in each province. At the same time, threaten and terrorize the people's spirit, brutally kill the leaders of the local Đồng Khởi riots. In the Central Highlands with a small population, the Army of the Republic of Vietnam established many outposts to isolate the Liberation Army from ethnic minority villages. However, the Republic of Vietnam could only control the cities and densely populated places, unable to keep the villages controlled by the Việt Minh.

== Result ==
By the end of 1960, the Đồng Khởi movement had basically disintegrated the rural grassroots government structure of the Republic of Vietnam. In 2,627 communes throughout the South, the National Front established self-government in 1,383 communes, while crippling the government of the Republic of Vietnam in most other communes. The population of the liberated area in the whole South was about 6.5 million people in the area controlled by the Front. The plan to establish a densely populated area and the policy of "land reform" of Ngô Đình Diệm failed. Two-thirds of the land in the land reform (about 170,000 hectares) was redistributed to the people. The Đồng Khởi movement in the countryside strongly promoted the political struggle movement in the urban areas. In 1960 in the South, there were 10 million turns of people participating in political struggles, of which the most typical was the struggle movement on the occasion of 20 July 1960.

On 20 December 1960, the National Front for the Liberation of the South was established, the number of members increased rapidly, even doubling every year. In early 1961, the Liberation Army of the South was also established by unifying guerrilla forces in each locality and establishing new concentrated army battalions. Tens of thousands of young people in the South joined the Liberation Army each year.

In a report to President Kennedy, the Central Intelligence Agency admitted:

"A very serious period for President Ngô Đình Diệm and the Republic of Vietnam lay ahead. Within the last six months of 1960, the security situation in the country continued to deteriorate and has now reached a serious level… The entire rural area south and southwest of Saigon as well as some northern regions is under great control of the Viet Cong."

In retaliation, President Kennedy and Ngô Đình Diệm proposed the Strategic Hamlet Program. Accordingly, people were forced to leave their places of residence and move into camps built by the U.S. and Republic of Vietnam in order to prevent people from being able to travel to supply guerrillas of the National Liberation Front.

== Idea ==
- The movement caused Ngô Đình Diệm's government to become deadlocked and confused because all actions of "adding plus and destroying communists" became counterproductive.
- Marking a new development step of the Việt Minh, they launched the National Front for the Liberation of South Vietnam. At that time, this force was no longer passively responding, no longer protecting the force while waiting for approval from superiors; they actively attack.
