= Chữ Nôm =

Chinese-based Vietnamese writing system

Chữ Nôm 𡨸喃
- Script type: Logographic
- Period: 13th century – 20th century
- Direction: Top-to-bottom, columns from right to left (traditional); Left-to-right (modern)
- Languages: Vietnamese

Related scripts
- Parent systems: Oracle bone script: Seal script; Clerical script; Regular script; Chữ Hán; Chữ Nôm
- Child systems: Nom Tay
- Sister systems: Sawndip

ISO 15924
- ISO 15924: Hani (500), Han (Hanzi, Kanji, Hanja)

Unicode
- Unicode alias: Han

Chữ Nôm (𡨸喃, IPA: [t͡ɕɯ˦ˀ˥ nom˧˧]) is a logographic writing system formerly used to write the Vietnamese language. It uses Chinese characters to represent Sino-Vietnamese vocabulary and some native Vietnamese words, with other words represented by new characters created using a variety of methods, including phono-semantic compounds. This composite script was therefore highly complex and was accessible to the less than five percent of the Vietnamese population who had mastered written Chinese.

Although all formal writing in Vietnam was done in Classical Chinese until the early 20th century (except for two brief interludes), between the 15th and 19th centuries some Vietnamese literati used chữ Nôm to create popular works in the vernacular, many in verse. One of the best-known pieces of Vietnamese literature, The Tale of Kiều, was written in chữ Nôm by Nguyễn Du.

The Vietnamese alphabet created by Portuguese Jesuit missionaries, with the earliest known usage occurring in the 17th century, replaced chữ Nôm as the preferred way to record Vietnamese literature from the 1920s. While Chinese characters are still used for decorative, historic and ceremonial value, chữ Nôm has fallen out of mainstream use in modern Vietnam. In the 21st century, chữ Nôm is being used in Vietnam for historical and liturgical purposes. The Institute of Hán-Nôm Studies at Hanoi is the main research centre for pre-modern texts from Vietnam, both Chinese-language texts written in Chinese characters (chữ Hán) and Vietnamese-language texts in chữ Nôm.

== Etymology ==
The Vietnamese word chữ 'character' is derived from the Middle Chinese word dzi^{H} 字, meaning '[Chinese] character'. The word Nôm 'Southern' is derived from the Middle Chinese word nom 南, (Note: The reconstruction of Middle Chinese used here is Baxter's transcription for Middle Chinese.) meaning 'south'. It could also be based on the dialectal pronunciation from the South Central dialects (most notably in the name of province of Quảng Nam, known locally as Quảng Nôm).

There are many ways to write the name chữ Nôm in chữ Nôm characters. The word chữ may be written as 字, 𫳘(⿰字宁), 𡨸, 𫿰(⿰字文), 𡦂(⿰字字), 𲂯(⿰貝字), 𱚂(⿱字渚), or 宁, while Nôm is written as 喃.

== Terminology ==
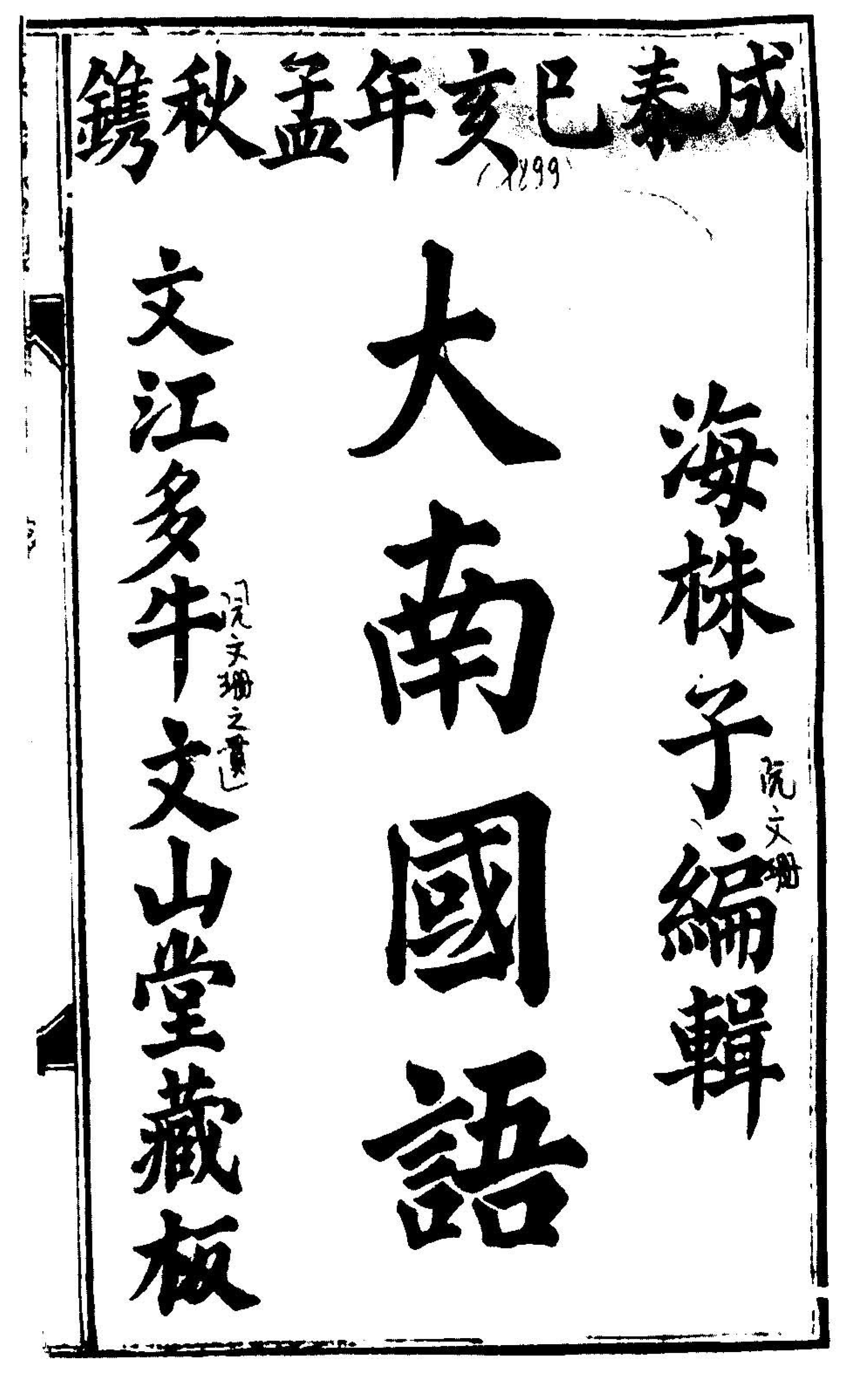
Quốc ngữ (國語) was used historically to refer to chữ Nôm. Such as in the book, Đại Nam quốc ngữ (大南國語), a Literary Chinese – Vietnamese (chữ Nôm) dictionary.

Chữ Nôm is the logographic writing system of the Vietnamese language. It is based on the Chinese writing system but adds a large number of new characters to make it fit the Vietnamese language. Common historical terms for chữ Nôm were Quốc Âm (國音, 'national sound') and Quốc ngữ (國語, 'national language').

In Vietnamese, Chinese characters are called chữ Hán (𡨸漢 'Han characters'), chữ Nho (𡨸儒 'Confucian characters', due to the connection with Confucianism) and uncommonly as Hán tự (漢字 'Han characters'). Hán văn (漢文) refers to literature written in Literary Chinese.

The term Hán Nôm (漢喃 'Han and chữ Nôm characters') in Vietnamese designates the whole body of premodern written materials from Vietnam, either written in Chinese (chữ Hán) or in Vietnamese (chữ Nôm). Hán and Nôm could also be found in the same document side by side, for example, in the case of translations of books on Chinese medicine. The Buddhist history Cổ Châu Pháp Vân phật bản hạnh ngữ lục (1752) gives the story of early Buddhism in Vietnam both in Hán script and in a parallel Nôm translation. The Jesuit Girolamo Maiorica (1605–1656) had also used parallel Hán and Nôm texts.

The term chữ Quốc ngữ (𡨸國語 'national language script') refers to the Vietnamese alphabet in current use, but was used to refer to chữ Nôm before the Vietnamese alphabet was widely used.

== History ==
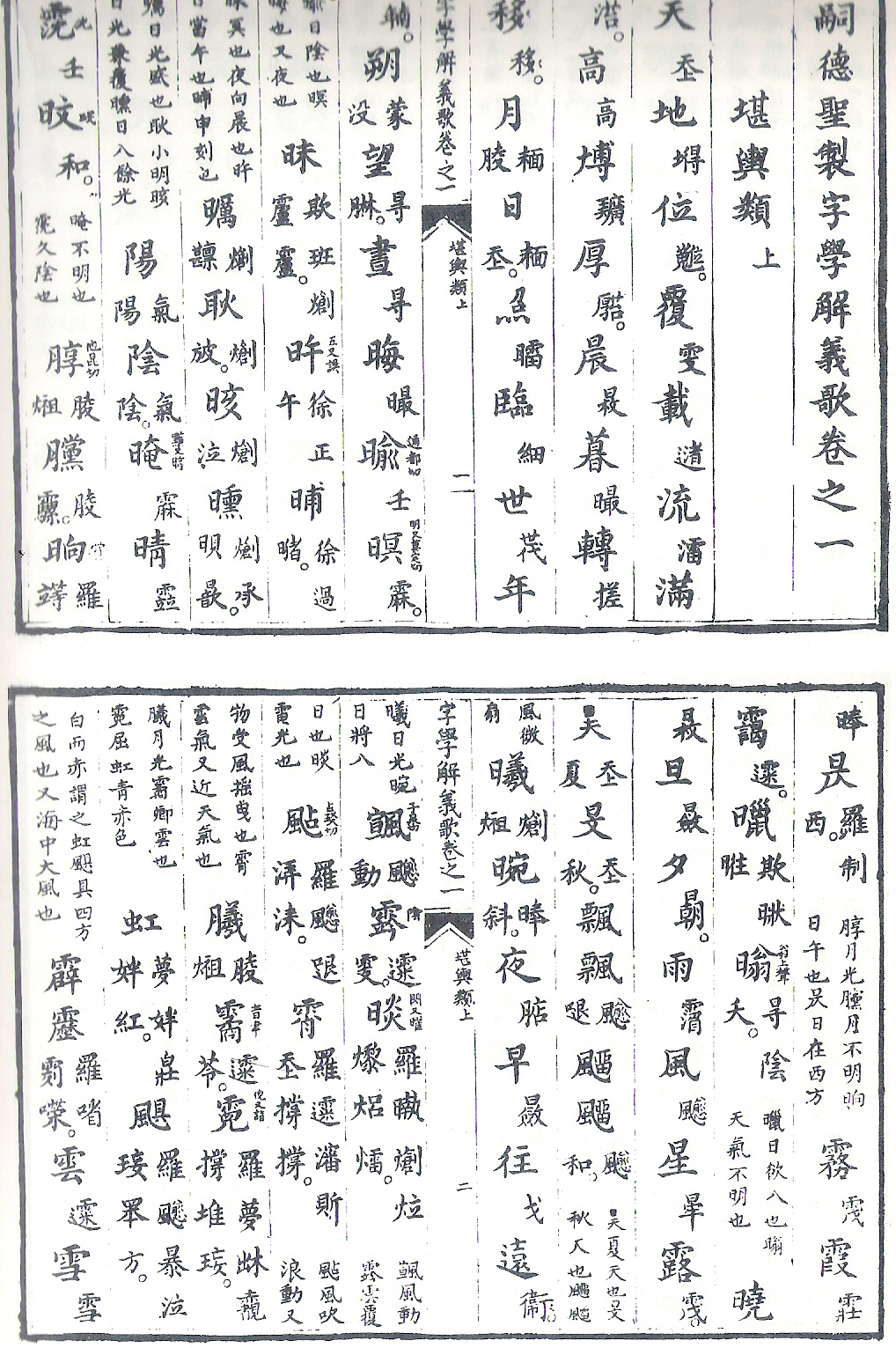
A page from Tự Đức thánh chế tự học giải nghĩa ca (嗣德聖製字學解義歌), a 19th-century primer for teaching Vietnamese children Chinese characters. The work is attributed to Emperor Tự Đức, the fourth emperor of the Nguyễn dynasty. In this primer, chữ Nôm is used to gloss the Chinese characters, for example, 𡗶 is used to gloss 天.

Chinese characters were introduced to Vietnam after the Han dynasty conquered Nanyue in 111 BC. Independence was achieved after the Battle of Bạch Đằng in 938, but Literary Chinese was adopted for official purposes in 1010. For most of the period up to the early 20th century, formal writing was indistinguishable from contemporaneous classical Chinese works produced in China, Korea, and Japan.

Vietnamese scholars were thus intimately familiar with Chinese writing. In order to record their native language, they applied the structural principles of Chinese characters to develop chữ Nôm. The new script was mostly used to record folk songs and for other popular literature. Vietnamese written in chữ Nôm briefly replaced Chinese for official purposes under the Hồ dynasty (1400–1407) and under the Tây Sơn (1778–1802), but in both cases this was swiftly reversed.

=== Early development ===
The use of Chinese characters to transcribe the Vietnamese language can be traced to an inscription with the two characters "布蓋", as part of the posthumous title of Phùng Hưng, a national hero who succeeded in briefly expelling the Chinese in the late 8th century. The two characters have literal Chinese meanings 'cloth' and 'cover', which make no sense in this context. They have thus been interpreted as a phonetic transcription, via their Middle Chinese pronunciations bu^{H} kaj^{H}, of a Vietnamese phrase, either vua cái 'great king', or bố cái 'father and mother' (of the people).

After Vietnam established its independence from China in the 10th century, Đinh Bộ Lĩnh (r. 968–979), the founder of the Đinh dynasty, named the country Đại Cồ Việt 大瞿越. The first and third Chinese characters mean 'great' and 'Viet'. The second character was often used to transcribe non-Chinese terms and names phonetically. In this context, cồ is an obsolete Vietnamese word for 'big'. (Note: The word is still used in some dialects of Vietnamese, and is found fossilized in some words such as gà cồ (𪃿瞿) and cồ cộ (瞿椇). It is also used with the meaning of 'big' in the text, Cư Trần lạc đạo phú (居塵樂道賦), Đệ thất hội (第七會), where it reads 勉德瞿經裴兀扲戒咹㪰 (Mến đức cồ kiêng bùi ngọt cầm giới ăn chay). Other variant characters for cồ include 𡚝 (⿱大瞿) and 𬯵 (⿱賏瞿).)

The oldest surviving inscription using Chinese characters to transcribe Vietnamese names is on a stele at the Báo Ân pagoda in Tháp Miếu village (Phúc Yên, Vĩnh Phúc province). The inscription, re-engraved in the 18th century from an original dating from 1209, is written in Chinese but includes names of 21 people and villages written in an early form of Nôm. Another stele at Hộ Thành Sơn in Ninh Bình Province (1343) is reported as listing 20 villages. (Note: The Hộ Thành Sơn inscription was mentioned by Henri Maspero. This mention was often cited, including by DeFrancis and Thompson, but according to Nguyễn Đình Hoà no-one has been able to find the inscription that Maspero referred to.)

Trần Nhân Tông (r. 1278–1293) ordered that Nôm be used to communicate his proclamations to the people. The first literary writing in Vietnamese is said to have been an incantation in verse composed in 1282 by the Minister of Justice Nguyễn Thuyên and thrown into the Red River to expel a menacing crocodile. Four poems written in Nom from the Tran dynasty, two by Trần Nhân Tông and one each by Huyền Quang and Mạc Đĩnh Chi, were collected and published in 1805.

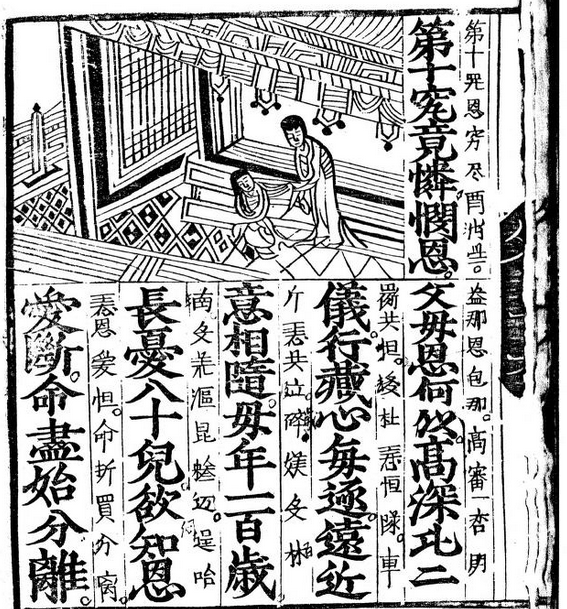
A page of Phật thuyết đại báo phụ mẫu ân trọng kinh (佛說大報父母恩重經) shows text in Literary Chinese alongside an earlier form of chữ Nôm recording Old Vietnamese. Some characters are double-phonetic characters (hội âm; 會音) used to represent the consonant clusters and polysyllabic words that were present in Old Vietnamese. In the second column, the first character is one such example. Blời (trời) is written as 𫶸 where 巴 ba represents ⟨b⟩ and 例 lệ represents ⟨l⟩ in ⟨bl⟩.

The Nôm text Phật thuyết đại báo phụ mẫu ân trọng kinh ('Sūtra explained by the Buddha on the Great Repayment of the Heavy Debt to Parents') was printed around 1730, but conspicuously avoids the character 利 lợi, suggesting that it was written (or copied) during the reign of Lê Lợi (1428–1433) (see Naming taboo § Vietnam). Based on archaic features of the text compared with the Tran dynasty poems, including an exceptional number of words with initial consonant clusters written with pairs of characters, some scholars suggest that it is a copy of an earlier original, perhaps as early as the 12th century.

=== Hồ dynasty (1400–1407) and Ming conquest (1407–1427) ===
During the seven years of the Hồ dynasty (1400–1407) Classical Chinese was discouraged in favor of vernacular Vietnamese written in Nôm, which became the official script. The emperor Hồ Quý Ly even ordered the translation of the Book of Documents into Nôm and pushed for reinterpretation of Confucian thoughts in his book Minh đạo. These efforts were reversed with the fall of the Hồ and Chinese conquest of 1407, lasting twenty years, during which use of the vernacular language and script were suppressed.

During the Ming dynasty occupation of Vietnam, chữ Nôm printing blocks, texts and inscriptions were thoroughly destroyed; as a result the earliest surviving texts of chữ Nôm post-date the occupation.

=== 15th to 19th centuries ===
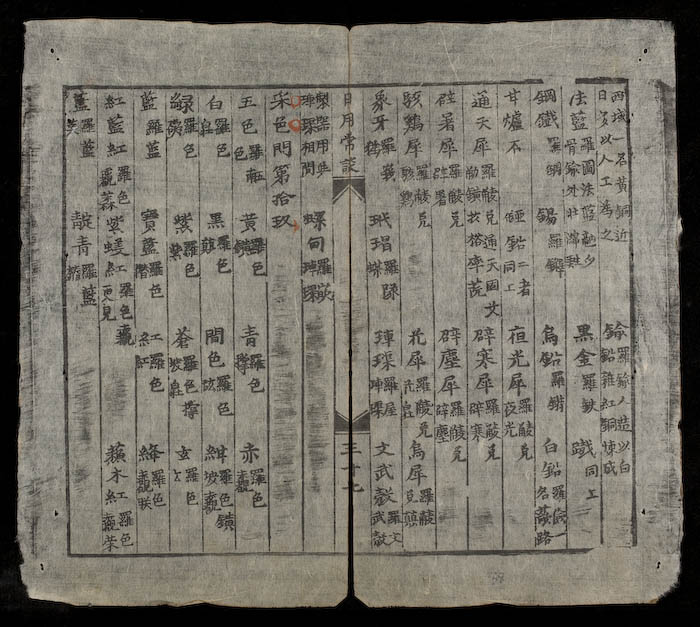
A page from the bilingual dictionary Nhật dụng thường đàm (日用常談; 1851). Characters representing words in Hán (Chinese) are explained in Nôm (Vietnamese).

Chữ Nôm was not reinstated as the official script after the demise of the Hồ dynasty and restoration of Viet rule. Very few extant vernacular texts in Nôm predate the 15th century and even many later texts in Nôm were translations or rewritings of works in Chinese. During the 15th and 16th centuries, reformist governments translated Chinese Classics into Nôm, but these translations have not survived due to being seen as subversive by successive governments. As a result of its marginalized nature and lack of institutional backing, chữ Nôm was used as a medium for social protest during the Lê dynasty (1428–1789), leading to its banning in 1663, 1718, and 1760.

While almost all official writings and documents continued to be written in Classical Chinese until the early 20th century, Nôm was used for popular literary compositions. The corpus of Nôm writings grew over time as did more scholarly compilations of the script itself. Among the earlier works in Nôm of this era are the writings of Nguyễn Trãi (1380–1442) which aimed to disseminate Neo-Confucianism among as broad an audience as possible. Trịnh Thị Ngọc Trúc, consort of King Lê Thần Tông, is generally given credit for Chỉ nam ngọc âm giải nghĩa (指南玉音解義; 'guide to Southern Jade sounds: explanations and meanings'), a 24,000-character bilingual Hán-to-Nôm dictionary compiled between the 15th and 18th centuries, most likely in 1641 or 1761.

The Tây Sơn dynasty (1778–1802) mandated the use of Nôm in both government business and civil service examinations but their policy was reverted after the dynasty's collapse. Gia Long (r. 1802–1820), founder of the Nguyễn dynasty (1802–1945), supported chữ Nôm only for as long as it took for him to become emperor and then immediately reverted to Chinese. His successor, Minh Mạng (r. 1820–1841), the second emperor of the Nguyễn dynasty, prohibited the use of Nôm in the government.

Nôm reached its golden period with the Nguyễn dynasty in the 19th century as it became a vehicle for diverse genres, from novels to theatrical pieces, and instructional manuals. Apogees of Vietnamese literature emerged with Nguyễn Du's The Tale of Kiều and Hồ Xuân Hương's poetry. Although literacy in premodern Vietnam was limited to just 3 to 5 percent of the population, nearly every village had someone who could read Nôm aloud for the benefit of other villagers. Thus these Nôm works circulated orally in the villages, and were accessible even to the illiterates.

Nôm was used as the dominant script in Vietnamese Catholic literature until the late 19th century. In 1838, Jean-Louis Taberd compiled a Nôm dictionary, helping with the standardization of the script. The reformist Catholic scholar Nguyễn Trường Tộ presented the Emperor Tự Đức with a series of unsuccessful petitions (written in Classical Chinese, like all court documents) proposing reforms in several areas of government and society. His petition Tế cấp bát điều (濟急八條 'Eight urgent matters', 1867), includes proposals on education, including a section entitled Xin khoan dung quốc âm ('Please tolerate the national voice'). He proposed to replace Classical Chinese with Vietnamese written using a script based on Chinese characters that he called Quốc âm Hán tự (國音漢字 'Han characters with national pronunciations'), though he described this as a new creation, and did not mention chữ Nôm.

Despite the increasing use of Nôm for popular literature and as a medium for oral dissemination in rural areas, this composite script was never able to supplant Classical Chinese as the primary script of Vietnam. It was highly complex and inefficient, requiring the user to have some prior knowledge of the Chinese script. It was accessible to less than five percent of the Vietnamese population who had already mastered written Chinese and served primarily as a way to learn Classical Chinese and to record folk literature. The small number of literati who took Nôm seriously had to contend with their peers and make sure not to offend their sense of propriety. Even figures known to have written in Nôm such as Lê Thánh Tông and Nguyễn Trãi were more renowned for their Chinese language writings. According to language researcher Nguyen Thuy Dan, the majority of the Vietnamese elite up to the 19th century seem to have never written in anything but Classical Chinese and even criticized the use of Nôm.

=== French Indochina and the Latin alphabet ===
From the latter half of the 19th century onwards, the French colonial authorities discouraged or simply banned the use of classical Chinese, and promoted the use of the Vietnamese alphabet, which they viewed as a stepping stone toward learning French. Language reform movements in other Asian nations stimulated Vietnamese interest in the subject. Following the Russo-Japanese War of 1905, Japan was increasingly cited as a model for modernization. The Confucian education system was compared unfavourably to the Japanese system of public education. According to a polemic by writer Phan Châu Trinh, "so-called Confucian scholars" lacked knowledge of the modern world, as well as real understanding of Han literature. Their degrees showed only that they had learned how to write characters, he claimed.

The popularity of Hanoi's short-lived Tonkin Free School suggested that broad reform was possible. In 1910, the colonial school system adopted a "Franco-Vietnamese curriculum", which emphasized French and alphabetic Vietnamese. The traditional Civil Service Examination, which emphasized the command of classical Chinese, was dismantled in 1915 in Tonkin and was given for the last time at the imperial capital of Huế on January 4, 1919. The examination system, and the education system based on it, had been in effect for almost 900 years.

The decline of the Chinese script also led to the decline of chữ Nôm given that Nôm and Chinese characters are so intimately connected. After the First World War, chữ Nôm gradually died out as the Vietnamese alphabet grew more and more popular. In an article published in 1935 (based on a lecture given in 1925), Georges Cordier estimated that 70% of literate persons knew the alphabet, 20% knew chữ Nôm and 10% knew Chinese characters. However, estimates of the literacy rate in the late 1930s range from 5% to 20%. By 1953, literacy (using the alphabet) had risen to 70%.

The Gin people, descendants of 16th-century migrants from Vietnam to islands off Dongxing in southern China, now speak a form of Yue Chinese and Vietnamese, but their priests use songbooks and scriptures written in chữ Nôm in their ceremonies.

== Texts ==
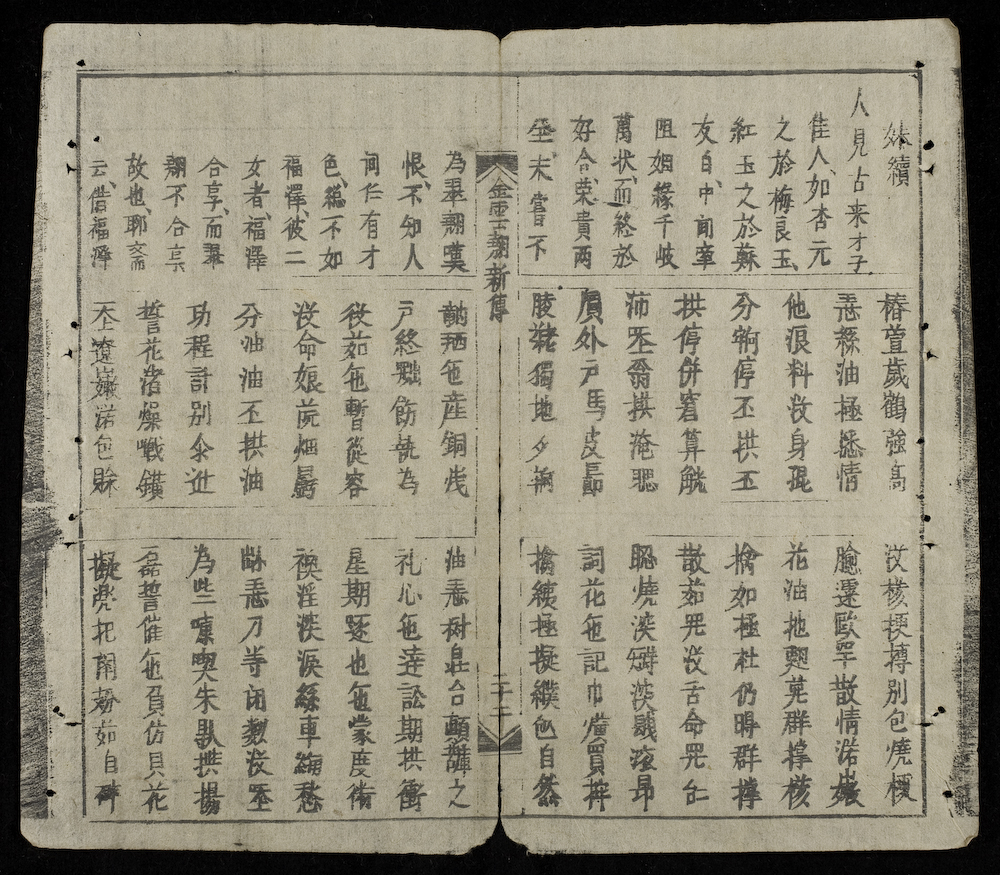
A page from The Tale of Kieu by Nguyễn Du. This novel was first published in 1820 and is the best-known work in Nôm. The edition shown was printed in the late 19th century.

- Đại Việt sử ký tiệp lục tổng tự. This history of Vietnam was written during the Tây Sơn dynasty. The original is Hán, and there is also a Nôm translation.
- Nguyễn Du, The Tale of Kieu (1820) The poem is full of obscure archaic words and Chinese borrowings, so that modern Vietnamese struggle to understand an alphabetic transcription without clarifications.
- Nguyễn Trãi, Quốc âm thi tập ("National Language Poetry Compilation")
- Phạm Đình Hồ, Nhật Dụng Thường Đàm (1851). A Hán-to-Nôm dictionary for Vietnamese speakers.
- Nguyễn Đình Chiểu, Lục Vân Tiên (19th century)
- Đặng Trần Côn, Chinh Phụ Ngâm Khúc (18th century)
- Various poems by Hồ Xuân Hương (18th century)
- Mechanics and Crafts of the People of Annam – French manuscript with illustrations depicting Vietnamese culture in French Indochina, the illustrations are described in chữ Nôm.
- Ngô Thì Nhậm, Tam thiên tự – Used to teach beginners Chinese characters and chữ Nôm.
- Nguyễn Phúc Hồng Nhậm, Tự Đức thánh chế tự học giải nghĩa ca – a 32,004 character bilingual Literary Chinese – Vietnamese character dictionary.

=== Types of texts ===
- Giải âm (解音) – a category of chữ Nôm texts that translates the "sounds" (word-for-word) of the original Literary Chinese text. Examples include Tam thiên tự giải âm (三千字解音), etc. There is significant diversity within works called giải âm (even within a single text), with some coming fairly close to the modern concept of translation, while some are closer to annotations with "word-matching" between Literary Chinese and Vietnamese, with little to no regard to the structure or syntax of Vietnamese.

Here is a line in Tam tự kinh lục bát diễn âm (三字經六八演音), a Vietnamese translation of the Three Character Classic. It features the original text on the top of the page and the Vietnamese translation on the bottom.

人不學不知理 (Nhân bất học bất tri lý)

𠊚空學別𨤰夷麻推 (Người không học biết nhẽ gì mà suy)

Without learning, one does not understand reason. (Note: The original line in the Chinese version is 人不學，不知義.)

- Diễn âm (演音) - synonym of giải âm (解音).
- Giải nghĩa (解義) – a category of chữ Nôm texts that translates the "meaning", often having no regard for Literary Chinese syntax. Examples include Chỉ nam ngọc âm giải nghĩa (指南玉音解義). Some giải nghĩa or diễn nghĩa works focus on extracting as much meaning as possible from the source texts, with little to no regard to the structure and syntax of Literary Chinese.
- Diễn nghĩa (演義) – synonym of giải nghĩa (解義).

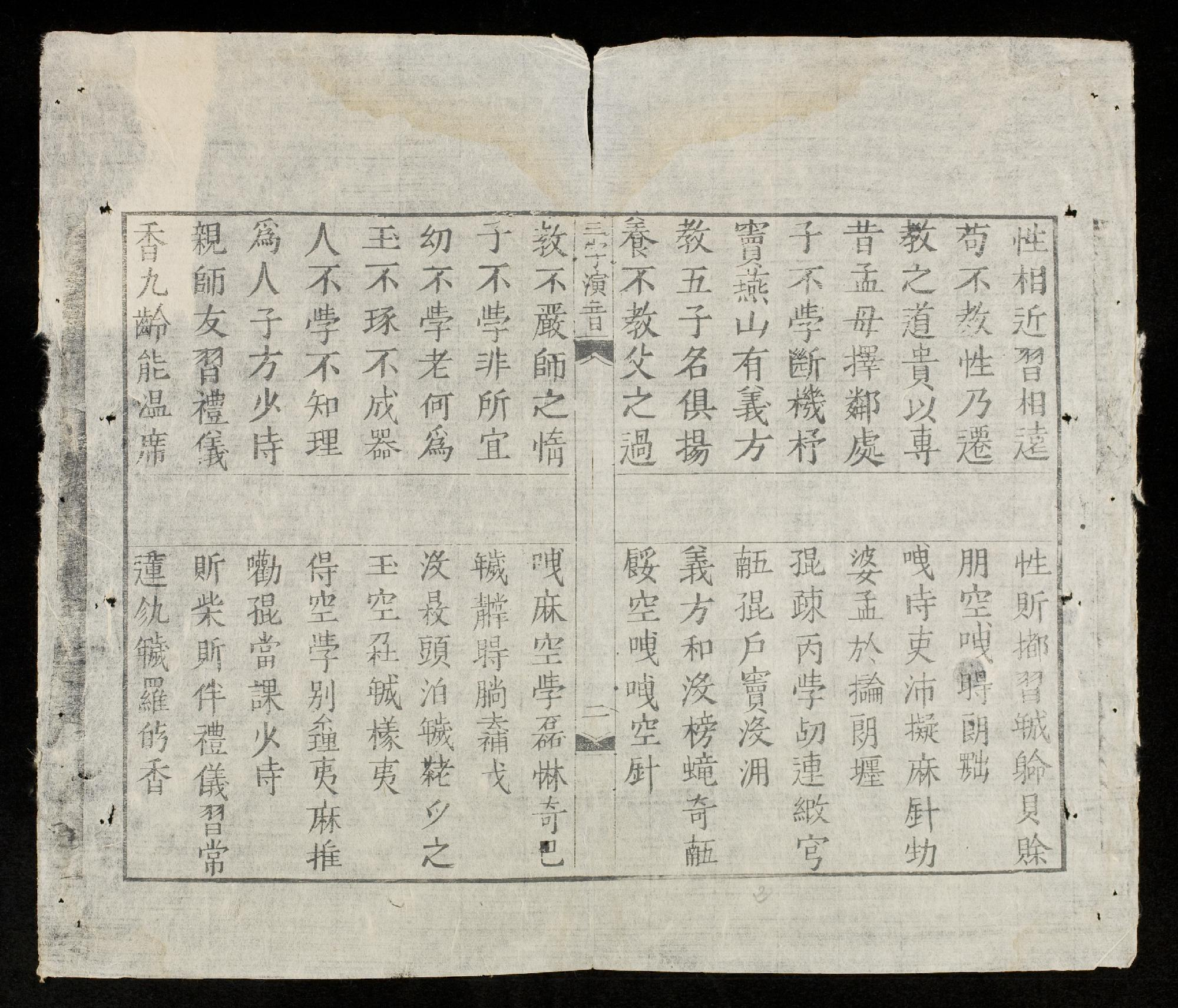
The second page of Tam tự kinh lục bát diễn âm (三字經六八演音) with the original Literary Chinese text on the top, and Vietnamese translation on the bottom. The Vietnamese text is written in chữ Nôm and lục bát (六八) verse form.

== Characters ==
Vietnamese is a tonal language, as is Chinese, and has nearly 5,000 distinct syllables. In chữ Nôm, each monosyllabic word of Vietnamese was represented by a character, either borrowed from Chinese or locally created. The resulting system was even more difficult to use than the Chinese script.

As an analytic language, Vietnamese was a better fit for a character-based script than Japanese and Korean, with their agglutinative morphology. Partly for this reason, there was no development of a phonetic system that could be taught to the general public, like Japanese kana syllabary or the Korean hangul alphabet, until the arrival of the Europeans. Moreover, most Vietnamese literati viewed Chinese as the proper medium of civilized writing, and had no interest in turning Nôm into a form of writing suitable for mass communication.

=== Variant characters ===
Chữ Nôm has never been standardized. As a result, a Vietnamese word could be represented by several Nôm characters. For example, the very word chữ ('character', 'script'), a Chinese loanword, can be written as either 字 (Chinese character), 𡦂 (Vietnamese-only compound-semantic character) or 𡨸 (Vietnamese-only semantic-phonetic character). For another example, the word giữa ('middle'; 'in between') can be written either as 𡨌 (⿰守中) or 𫡉 (⿰字中). Both characters were invented for Vietnamese and have a semantic-phonetic structure, the difference being the phonetic indicator (守 vs. 字).

Another example of a Vietnamese word that is represented by several Nôm characters is the word for moon, trăng. It can be represented by a Chinese character that is phonetically similar to trăng, 菱 (lăng), a Nôm character, 𢁋 (⿱巴陵) which is composed of two phonetic components 巴 (ba) and 陵 (lăng) for the Middle Vietnamese blăng, or a chữ Nôm character, 𦝄 (⿰月夌) composed of a phonetic component 夌 (lăng) and a semantic component meaning 月 ('moon').

=== Borrowed characters ===
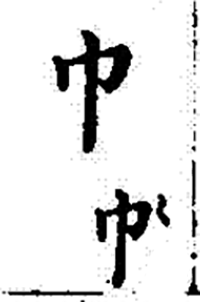
Characters for cân (top) and khăn (bottom), meaning turban/towel, in Tự Đức thánh chế tự học giải nghĩa ca. The character for khăn has a diacritic to indicate different pronunciation.

Unmodified Chinese characters were used in chữ Nôm in three different ways.

- A large proportion of Vietnamese vocabulary had been borrowed from Chinese during the Tang period. Such Sino-Vietnamese vocabulary could be written with the original Chinese character for each word, for example:
  - 役 dịch ziːk˨˩ ('service', 'corvée'), from Early Middle Chinese (EMC) /jwiajk/
  - 本 bản ɓaːn˧˨˧ ('root', 'foundation'), from EMC /pənˀ/
  - 頭 đầu dɤ̆ːw˨˩ ('head'), from EMC /dəw/
- One way to represent a native Vietnamese word was to use a Chinese character for a Chinese word with a similar meaning. For example, 本 may also represent vốn ('capital, funds'). In this case, the word vốn is actually an earlier Chinese loan that has become accepted as Vietnamese; William Hannas claims that all such readings are similar early loans.
- Alternatively, a native Vietnamese word could be written using a Chinese character for a Chinese word with a similar sound, regardless of the meaning of the Chinese word. For example, 沒 (Early Middle Chinese /mət/) may represent the Vietnamese word một ('one').

The first two categories are similar to the on and kun readings of Japanese kanji respectively. The third is similar to ateji, in which characters are used only for their sound value, or the Man'yōgana script that became the origin of hiragana and katakana.

When a character would have two readings, a diacritic may be added to the character to indicate the "indigenous" reading. The two most common alternate reading diacritical marks are cá (𖿰), (a variant form of 个) and nháy (𖿱). Thus when 本 is meant to be read as vốn, it is written as 本^{𖿱}, (Note: Properly written 本𖿱. The cá and nháy marks were added to the Ideographic Symbols and Punctuation block in Unicode 13.0, but they are poorly supported as of April 2021. ^{‹} is a visual approximation.) with a diacritic at the upper right corner.

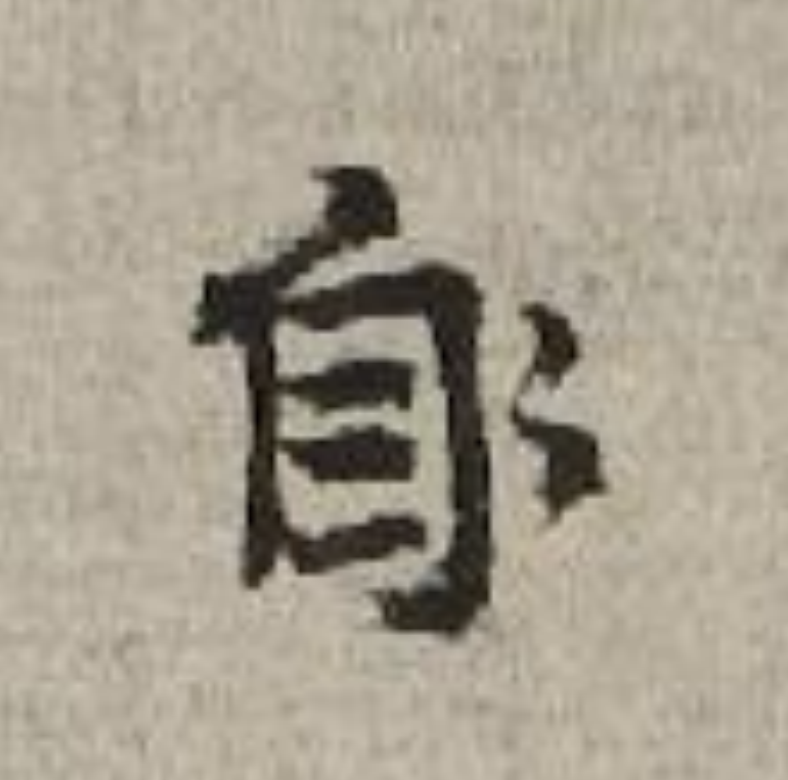
Here the character tự 自 is written with the nháy mark (𖿱), showing to use its alternative reading từ or vice versa. (Depending on the context, the alternative reading could also be tợ instead.)

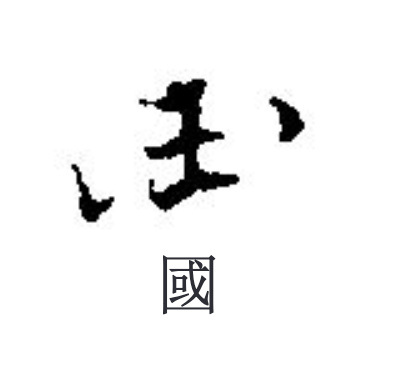
An example of what tháu đấm would be with the character quốc (國) which was written as 王 with two dots on its left and right side

Other alternate reading diacritical marks include tháu đấm (草𢶸) where a character is represented by a simplified variant with two points on either side of the character.

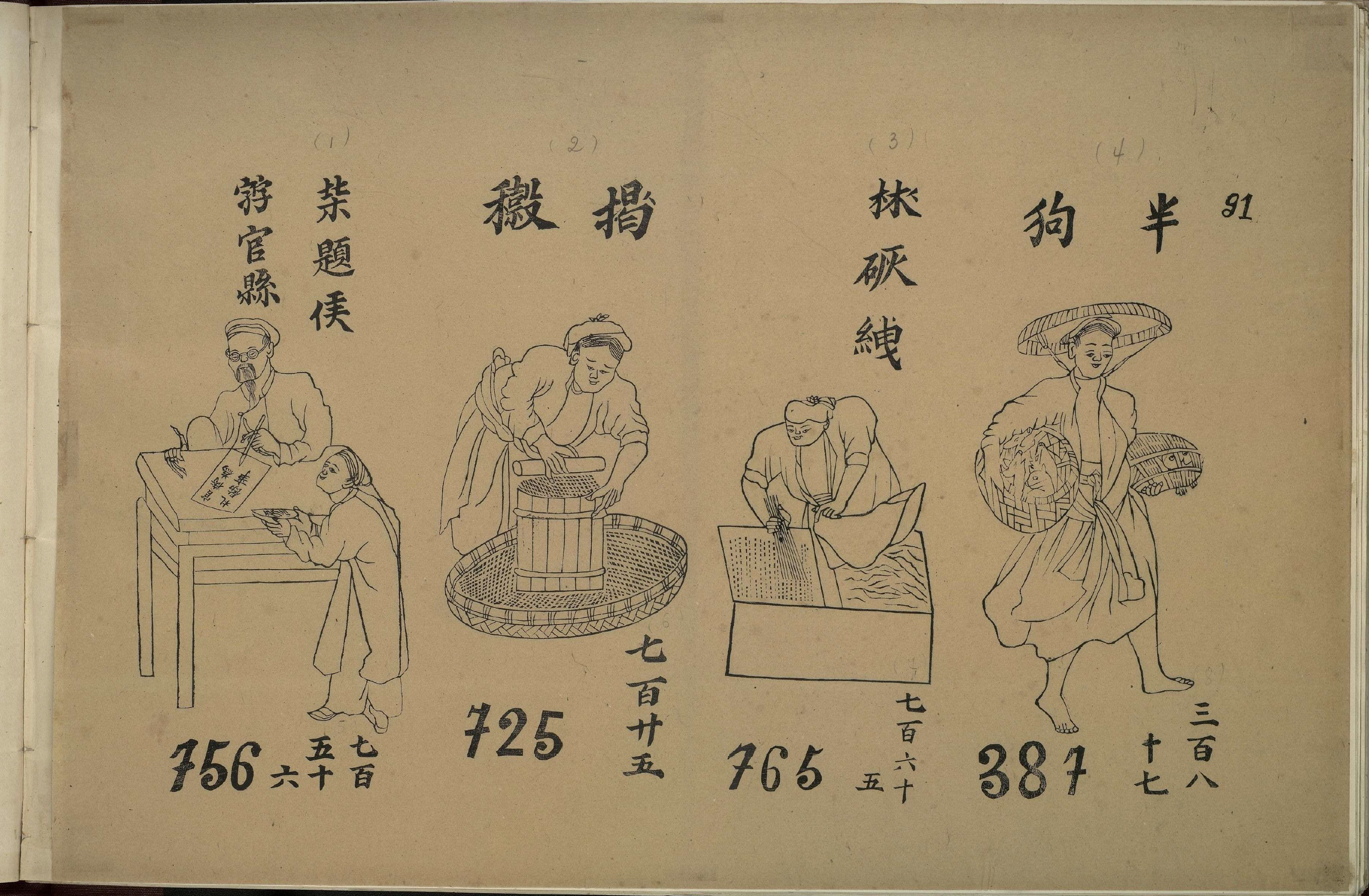
Usage of diacritical mark nháy (𖿱) can be seen here. The character yết (揭) with the mark ' 𖿱 ' changes the reading to xiết 揭^{𖿱} (Middle left). For lâm (林) with the mark ' 𖿱 ' changes the reading to chấm 林^{𖿱} (Middle right).

=== Locally invented characters ===
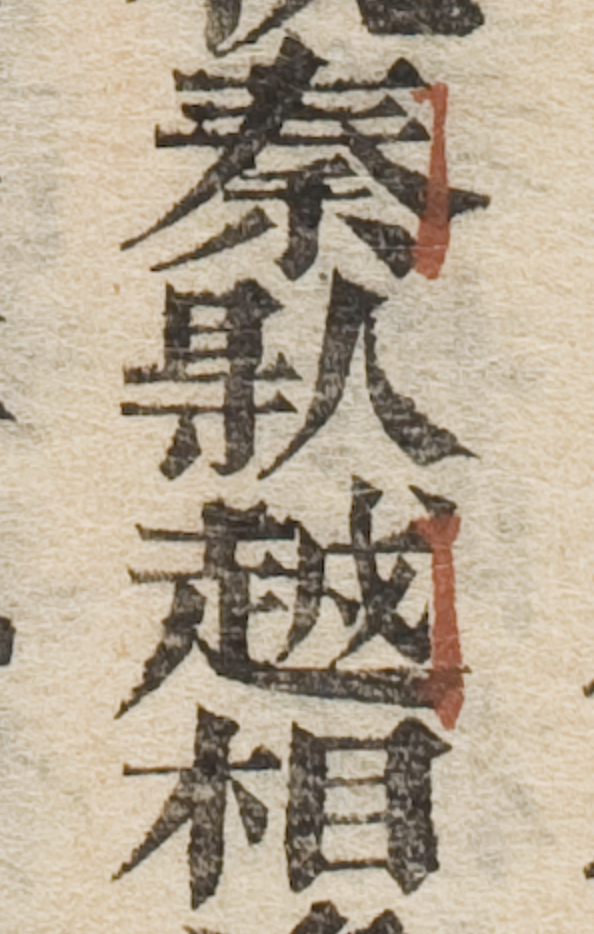
The Nôm character for người (𠊛), a term for people or humans (in general). The radical 㝵 on the left suggests that the pronunciation of the character is linked to that of 㝵 ngại. The radical 人 on the right suggests that the meaning of the character is linked to people. (The character after is the word Việt 越 meaning "Vietnamese"). The two characters mean "Vietnamese people".

In contrast to the few hundred Japanese kokuji (国字) and handful of Korean gukja (국자, 國字), which are mostly rarely used characters for indigenous natural phenomena, Vietnamese scribes created thousands of new characters, used throughout the language.

As in the Chinese writing system, the most common kind of invented character in Nôm is the phono-semantic compound, made by combining two characters or components, one suggesting the word's meaning and the other its approximate sound. For example:

- 𠀧 (ba 'three') is composed of the phonetic part 巴 (Sino-Vietnamese reading: ba) and the semantic part 三 'three'. 'Father' is also ba, but written as 爸 (⿱父巴), while 'turtle' is con ba ba 𡥵蚆蚆.
- 媄 (mẹ 'mother') has 女 'woman' as semantic component and 美 (Sino-Vietnamese reading: mỹ) as phonetic component. (Note: The character 媄 is also used in Chinese as an alternate form of 美 'beautiful'.)

A smaller group consists of semantic compound characters, which are composed of two Chinese characters representing words of similar meaning. For example, 𡗶 (giời or trời 'sky', 'heaven') is composed of 天 ('sky') and 上 ('upper').

A few characters were obtained by modifying Chinese characters related either semantically or phonetically to the word to be represented. For example,

- the Nôm character 𧘇 (ấy 'that', 'those') is a simplified form of the Chinese character 衣 (Sino-Vietnamese reading: ý). 𠂎 is a variant of 𧘇
- the Nôm character 𫜵 (làm 'work', 'labour') is a simplified form of the Chinese character 濫 (Sino-Vietnamese reading: lạm) (濫 > 𪵯 > 𫜵).
- the Nôm character 𠬠 (một 'one') comes from the right part of the Chinese character 没 (Sino-Vietnamese reading: một) (没 > 𱥺 > 𠬠).
- the Nôm character 𪜀 (là 'to be') is heavily simplified from the lower part of the Chinese character 羅 (Sino-Vietnamese reading: la) (羅 > 𱺵 > 𪜀).

=== Example ===
As an example of the way chữ Nôm was used to record Vietnamese, the first two lines of the Tale of Kiều (1871 edition), written in the traditional six-eight form of Vietnamese verse, consist of 14 characters:

𤾓 𢆥 𥪞 𡎝 𠊛 些
Trăm năm trong cõi người ta,
hundred year in world person our
A hundred years—in this life span on earth,

𡨸 才 𡨸 命 窖 𱺵 恄 饒
Chữ tài chữ mệnh khéo là ghét nhau.
word talent word destiny clever {to be} hate {each other}
talent and destiny are apt to feud.

Derivations of Nôm characters in the first two lines
character	word	gloss	derivation
𤾓 (⿱百林)	trăm	hundred	compound of 百 'hundred' and 林 lâm
𢆥 (⿰南年)	năm	year	compound of 南 nam and 年 'year'
𥪞 (⿺竜內)	trong	in	compound of 竜 long and 內 'inside'
𡎝 (⿰土癸)	cõi	world	compound of 土 'earth' and 癸 quý
𠊛 (⿰㝵人)	người	person	compound of 㝵 ngại and 人 'person'
些	ta	our	character of homophone Sino-Vietnamese ta 'little, few; rather, somewhat'
𡨸 (⿰宁字)	chữ	word	compound of 宁 trữ and 字 'character; word'
才	tài	talent	Sino-Vietnamese word
𡨸 (⿰宁字)	chữ	word	compound of 宁 trữ and 字 'character; word'
命	mệnh	destiny	Sino-Vietnamese word
窖	khéo	clever	variant character of the near-homophone Sino-Vietnamese 竅 khiếu 'hole', Sino-Vietnamese reading of 窖 is giáo
𱺵 (⿱罒𪜀)	là	to be	simplified form of 羅 là 'to be', using the character of near-homophone Sino-Vietnamese la 'net for catching birds'
恄	ghét	hate	compound of 忄 'heart' classifier and 吉 cát
饒	nhau	each other	character of near-homophone Sino-Vietnamese nhiêu 'bountiful, abundant, plentiful'

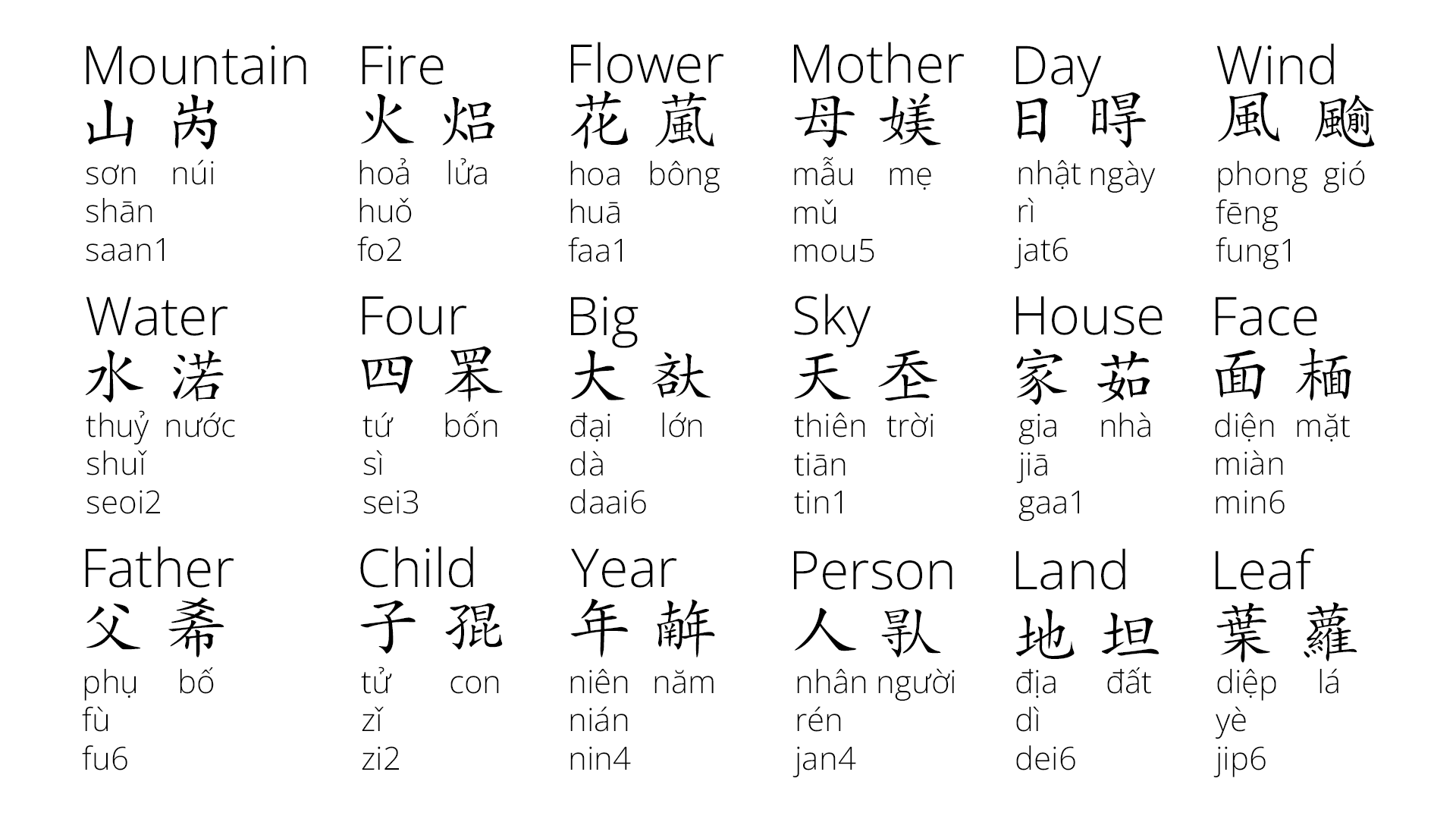
Chữ Hán characters compared to chữ Nôm characters

== Computer encoding ==
In 1993, the Vietnamese government released an 8-bit coding standard for alphabetic Vietnamese (TCVN 5712:1993, or VSCII), as well as a 16-bit standard for Nôm (TCVN 5773:1993). This group of glyphs is referred to as "V0." In 1994, the Ideographic Rapporteur Group agreed to include Nôm characters as part of Unicode. A revised standard, TCVN 6909:2001, defines 9,299 glyphs. About half of these glyphs are specific to Vietnam. Nôm characters not already encoded were added to CJK Unified Ideographs Extension B. (These characters have five-digit hexadecimal code points. The characters that were encoded earlier have four-digit hex.)

Code	Characters	Unicode block	Standard	Date	V Source	Sources
V0	2,246	Basic Block (593), A (138), B (1,515)	TCVN 5773:1993	2001	V0-3021 to V0-4927	5
V1	3,311	Basic Block (3,110), C (1)	TCVN 6056:1995	1999	V1-4A21 to V1-6D35	2, 5
V2	3,205	Basic Block (763), A (151), B (2,291)	VHN 01:1998	2001	V2-6E21 to V2-9171	2, 5
V3	535	Basic Block (91), A (19), B (425)	VHN 02:1998	2001	V3-3021 to V3-3644	Manuscripts
V4	785 (encoded)	Extension C	Defined as sources 1, 3, and 6	2009	V4-4021 to V4-4B2F	1, 3, 6
V04	1,028	Extension E	Unencoded V4 and V6 characters	Projected	V04-4022 to V04-583E	V4: 1, 3, 6; V6: 4, manuscripts
V5	~900	Proposed in 2001, but already coded		2001	None	2, 5
Sources: Nguyễn Quang Hồng, "Unibook Character Browser", Unicode, Inc., "Code Charts – CJK Ext. E" (N4358-A).

Characters were extracted from the following sources:

1. Hoàng Triều Ân, Tự điển chữ Nôm Tày [Nôm of the Tay People], 2003.
2. Institute of Linguistics, Bảng tra chữ Nôm [Nôm Index], Hanoi, 1976.
3. Nguyễn Quang Hồng, editor, Tự điển chữ Nôm [Nôm Dictionary], 2006.
4. Father Trần Văn Kiệm, Giúp đọc Nôm và Hán Việt [Help with Nôm and Sino-Vietnamese], 2004.
5. Vũ Văn Kính & Nguyễn Quang Xỷ, Tự điển chữ Nôm [Nôm Dictionary], Saigon, 1971.
6. Vũ Văn Kính, Bảng tra chữ Nôm miền Nam [Table of Nôm in the South], 1994.
7. Vũ Văn Kính, Bảng tra chữ Nôm sau thế kỷ XVII [Table of Nôm After the 17th Century], 1994.
8. Vũ Văn Kính, Đại tự điển chữ Nôm [Great Nôm Dictionary], 1999.
9. Nguyễn Văn Huyên, Góp phần nghiên cứu văn hoá Việt Nam [Contributions to the Study of Vietnamese Culture], 1995.

The V2, V3, and V4 proposals were developed by a group at the Han-Nom Research Institute led by Nguyễn Quang Hồng. V4, developed in 2001, includes over 400 ideograms formerly used by the Tày people of northern Vietnam. This allows the Tày language to get its own registration code. V5 is a set of about 900 characters proposed in 2001. As these characters were already part of Unicode, the IRG concluded that they could not be edited and no Vietnamese code was added. (This is despite the fact that national codes were added retroactively for version 3.0 in 1999.) The Nôm Na Group, led by Ngô Thanh Nhàn, published a set of nearly 20,000 Nôm characters in 2005. This set includes both the characters proposed earlier and a large group of additional characters referred to as "V6". These are mainly Han characters from Trần Văn Kiệm's dictionary which were already assigned code points. Character readings were determined manually by Hồng's group, while Nhàn's group developed software for this purpose. The work of the two groups was integrated and published in 2008 as the Hán Nôm Coded Character Repertoire.

Character	Composition	Nôm reading	Sino-Vietnamese reading	Meaning	Code point	V Source	Other sources
吧	⿰口巴	và	ba	(slightly formal) and	U+5427	V0-3122	G0,J,KP,K,T
傷	⿰亻⿱𠂉昜	thương	thương	wound, injury, to love non-romantically	U+50B7	V1-4C22	G1,J,KP,K,T
𠊛	⿰㝵人	người	N/A	people	U+2029B	V2-6E4F	None
㤝	⿰忄充	suông	song	plain, bland	U+391D	V3-313D	G3,KP,K,T
𫋙	⿰虫強	càng	N/A	claw, pincer	U+2B2D9	V4-536F	None
𫡯 (Note: This character is only used in the Tày language; the Vietnamese variant is 𢀭 giàu.)	⿰朝乙	chàu	N/A	wealth	U+2B86F	V4-405E	None
Key: G0 = China (GB 2312); G1 = China (GB 12345); G3 = China (GB 7589); GHZ = Hanyu Da Zidian; J = Japan; KP= North Korea; K = South Korea; T = Taiwan. Sources: Unihan Database, Vietnamese Nôm Preservation Foundation, "Code Charts – CJK Ext. E" (N4358-A). The Han-Viet readings are from Hán Việt Từ Điển.

The characters that do not exist in Chinese have Sino-Vietnamese readings that are based on the characters given in parentheses. The common character for càng (強) contains the radical 虫 (insects). This radical is added redundantly to create 𫋙, a rare variation shown in the chart above. The character 𫡯 (chàu) is specific to the Tày people. It has been part of the Unicode standard only since version 8.0 of June 2015, so there is still very little font and input method support for it. It is a variation of 朝; the corresponding character in Vietnamese.

== See also ==
- Chinese family of scripts
- Sino-Xenic pronunciations
