= Gia Dinh Bao =

Vietnamese newspaper

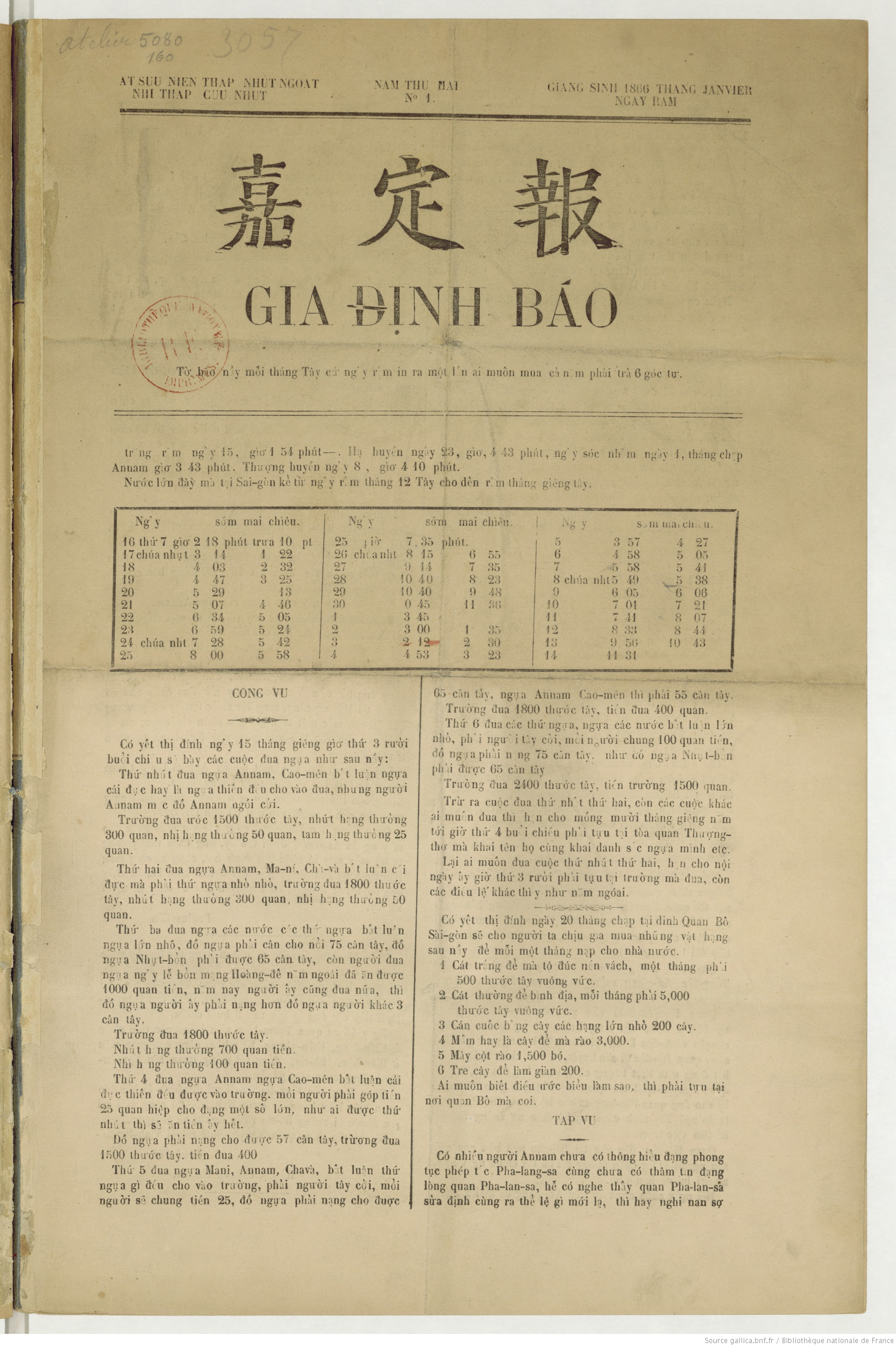
The front page of the newspaper

Gia Định Báo (chữ Hán: 嘉定報), was the first Vietnamese newspaper. It was published in Saigon from 1865 to 1910. Pétrus Ky was the editor in chief. "Gia Định" is a historical name for Saigon, now Ho Chi Minh City. It was a gazette that published official and legal documents, although it also included articles on Vietnamese culture and agriculture. Woodblock printing in Chinese characters remained the norm until the early 20th century, so the paper's use of the modern typography and the Latin alphabet were innovations. In the 1890s, it was Vietnam's newspaper of record.

The first issue of the newspaper is dated April 15, 1865, and regular publication ended in 1897. The last issue is dated December 31, 1909. The format is 25 x 32 cm. It was published weekly and the price was 0.97 dong. It was four pages long, later expanded to 12.

Many of the newspaper's contributors were Catholics.
