= Quốc âm thi tập =

Vietnamese poetry collection

- 國音詩集
- Author(s): Nguyễn Trãi (阮廌)
- Language: Vietnamese (written in chữ Nôm)
- Date: 15th century

The Quốc âm thi tập (Vietnamese: 國音詩集, "National pronunciation poetry collection") (Note: Quốc âm was used to refer to chữ Nôm.) is a collection of Vietnamese poetry written in the vernacular chữ Nôm script. It is attributed to Nguyễn Trãi (chữ Hán: 阮廌). The collection of 254 poems was traditionally written after Nguyễn Trãi's retirement from court life. It was compiled around the reign of emperor Lê Thánh Tông (1460–1497).

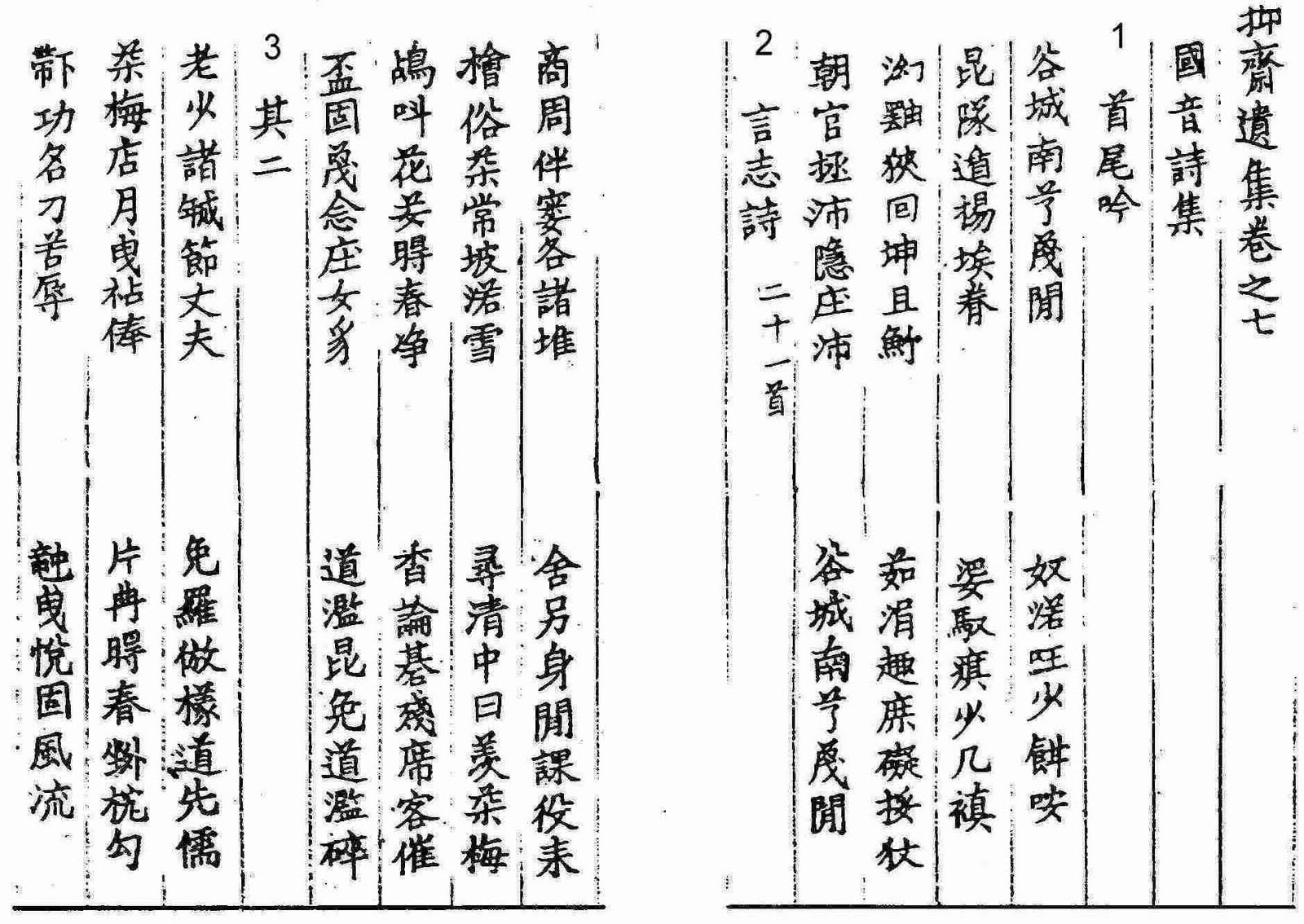
The first page of Quốc âm thi tập contains the poems Thủ vĩ ngâm (首尾吟), Ngôn chí thi 1 (言志詩), and Ngôn chí thi 2 (其二, 言志詩). This collection is found in Ức Trai di tập (抑齋遺集; 1868; Seventh volume)

== Background ==
Quốc âm thi tập helped lead the development of chữ Nôm as a script for Vietnamese, and it contains poetic themes not found in Literary Chinese poems. The text itself contains approximately 12,500 different Nôm characters that were used during the 15th century. The text tended to use characters for their sound rather than use phono-semantic characters that were later created as the chữ Nôm was being developed. An example would be the phrase 濁濁: normally it would be read as trọc trọc, (Note: The Sino-Vietnamese reading of 濁 is trọc) but Quốc âm thi tập it is read as đục đục according to the Nôm reading.

== Text ==
首尾吟 Thủ vĩ ngâm (Note: Thủ vĩ ngâm is the first poem of the collection.)
Chữ Nôm	Vietnamese alphabet
谷城南𦫼蔑閒	Góc thành nam lều một căn,
奴渃㕵少𩚵咹	No nước uống thiếu cơm ăn.
昆隊遁樣埃眷	Con đòi trốn dường ai quyến,
𱙘馭𤷍少几𧜖	Bà ngựa gày thiếu kẻ chăn.
𬇚𪽝狹囘坤且𩵜	Ao bởi hẹp hòi khôn thả cá,
茹涓趣𱝅礙挼𤝋	Nhà quen thú thứa ngại nuôi vằn.
朝官拯沛隱庒沛	Triều quan chẳng phải ẩn chẳng phải,
谷城南𦫼蔑閒	Góc thành nam lều một căn.

言志詩 Ngôn chí thi 7 (Cơm trời áo cha) (Note: Ngôn chí thi 7, also known as Cơm trời áo cha, is the eighth poem of the collection.)
Chữ Nôm	Vietnamese alphabet
㐌𠇍秋尼底例茹	Đã mấy thu nay để lệ nhà,
緣𱜢刁等庫庒赦	Duyên nào đeo đẳng khó chăng tha.
蔑身吝橘塘科目	Một thân lẩn quất đường khoa mục,
𠄩𡨸麻恾役國家	Hai chữ mơ màng việc quốc gia.
才劣辣饒𢧚劔伴	Tài lẹt lạt nhiều, nên kém bạn,
𠊚𤷱痗歇福群些	Người mòn mỏi hết, phúc còn ta
君親渚報𢚸更更	Quân thân chưa báo lòng cánh cánh,
情負𩚵𡗶襖吒	Tình phụ cơm trời áo cha.

== Influence ==
The original Quốc âm thi tập influenced emperor-reformer Lê Thánh Tông was best known for his Hồng Đức legal code. Lê Thánh Tông was also a poet and organized a literary group in 1495 called Tao Đàn nhị thập bát tú (chữ Hán: 騷壇二十八秀). The group produced another vernacular chữ Nôm collection, the Hồng Đức Quốc Âm thi tập (洪德國音詩集, "Hồng Đức National pronunciation poetry collection").
