= Nguyễn Thuyên =

Vietnamese official and writer

Vietnamese name
- Vietnamese: Nguyễn Thuyên
- Hán-Nôm: 阮詮

Nguyễn Thuyên or Hàn Thuyên (Bắc Ninh) was a 13th-century Vietnamese official and writer. According to Đại Việt sử ký toàn thư, in 1282, he composed a piece of writing, throwing it into the Red River to chase away a crocodile, similar to what the Tang dynasty official and writer Han Yu once did. As a result, Emperor Trần Nhân Tông gave him the surname Hàn. He is known as the first one to compose Vietnamese poems in chữ Nôm, although his works did not survive. Following the Chinese model, he divided the six tones of Vietnamese into "flat" (平) and "sharp" (仄), and used this distinction as the metrical foundation of his poems. The poets after him followed this practice.

- Alternate name
- Vietnamese alphabet: Hàn Thuyên
- Hán-Nôm: 韓詮
