= Lục Vân Tiên =

The Tale of Lục Vân Tiên
- Truyện Lục Vân Tiên
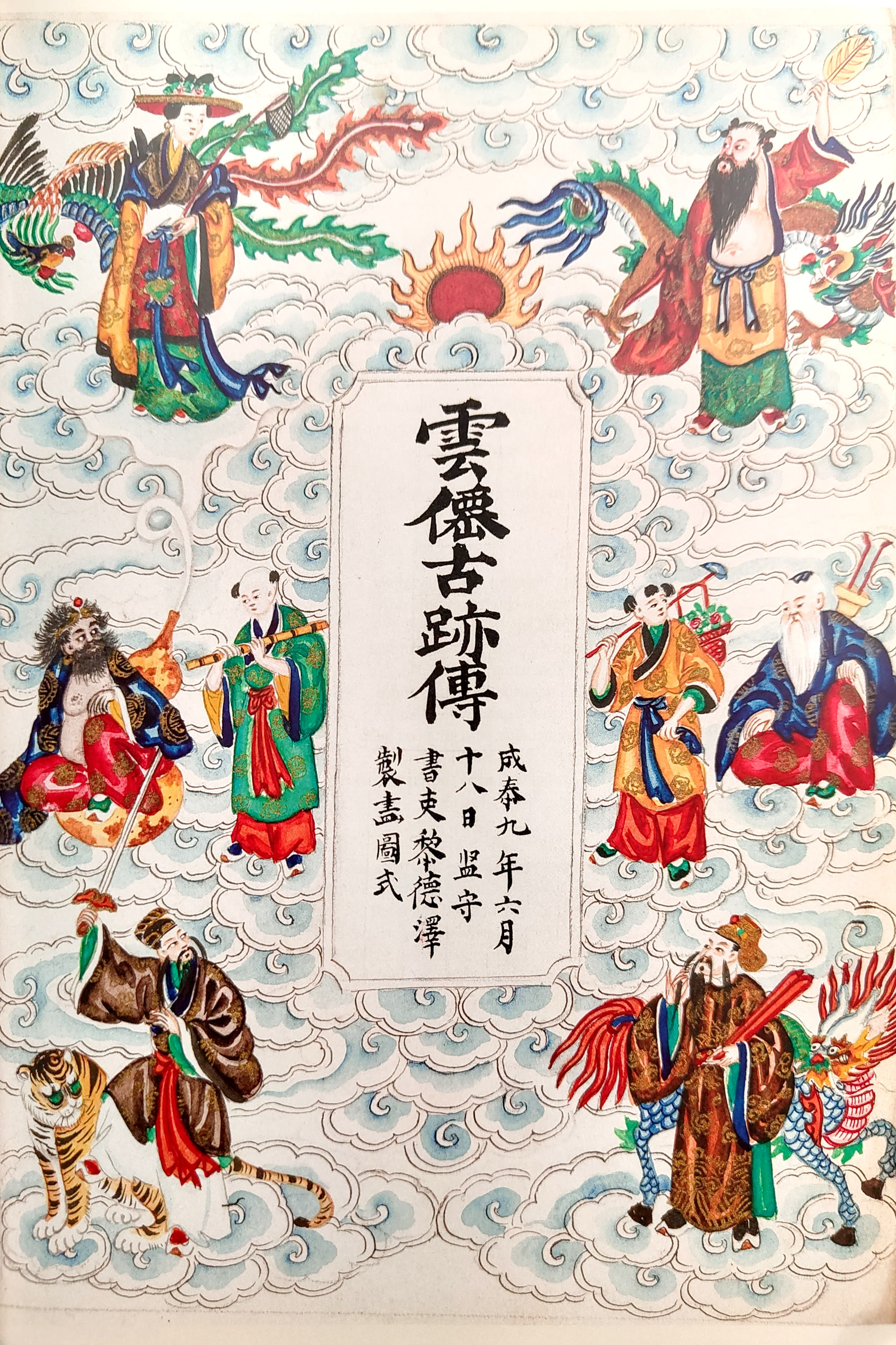
- The cover of Vân Tiên cổ tích truyện (雲僊古跡傳, 1897), an illuminated manuscript drawn by Lê Đức Trạch.
- Author(s): Nguyễn Đình Chiểu
- Language: Vietnamese (written in Chữ Nôm)
- State of existence: Emperor Tự Đức
- Genre: epic poem
- Verse form: lục bát (6/8)
- Length: 2,082 verses
- Personages: Lục Vân Tiên

The Tale of Lục Vân Tiên (傳蓼雲仙; Truyện Lục Vân Tiên) is a 19th-century Vietnamese-language epic poem written in vernacular Chữ Nôm script by the blind poet Nguyễn Đình Chiểu (1822–1888).

The 2082-line (present version) work is one of the two most recognizable and influential epic poems in Vietnamese (the other being The Tale of Kiều (Vietnamese: Truyện Kiều / 傳翹) by Nguyễn Du). Its reaffirmation of Vietnam's traditional moral virtues, at a time when Vietnamese society was facing the French invasion, had great popular appeal.

== Plot ==
Perhaps the best English language summary of Lục Vân Tiên is given by Professor John C. Schafer in his essay "Lục Vân Tiên: Its Relation to Prior Texts." Here is his summary:

As the story opens, Lục Vân Tiên, the main character, says goodbye to his teacher at the Confucian school and sets off for the capital to take the examinations to become a mandarin. On the way he comes across some brigands who have kidnapped the beautiful Kiều Nguyệt Nga. Tiên rescues her and the gratitude she feels for him is soon tinged with love. To express her appreciation, she writes him a poem, but then they part. Nga returns to Hà Khê, where her father is an official, and draws a portrait of Tiên to help her remember her absent lover; Tiên continues on to the examination site. On the way he stops off at the home of Võ Thể Loan, a girl with whom his parents have arranged his marriage. After spending some time with Loan's parents, who seem pleased with the prospect of their daughter marrying the young talented scholar, he continues on his way. On his journey he meets three fellow examination candidates, one of whom turns out to be a loyal friend, while the other two become jealous and vindictive villains.

Unfortunately, Tiên never gets to the examinations. When he is about to enter the exam, he hears that his mother has died and decides to return home immediately to go into mourning for her. During his return journey he becomes so sick and weak from weeping that he eventually goes blind. Wandering blind and unprotected around the countryside, he becomes an easy victim for deceitful fortune tellers, medicine men, and sorcerers who trick him out of his money. A villainous fellow examination candidate and his future in-laws treat him even more cruelly: The examination candidate, jealous of Tiên's superior talent, pushes him into a river and Tiên's future in-laws, afraid they will be stuck with a worthless blind man for a son-in-law, leave him to die in a cave. But, as the narrator frequently reminds his readers, the agents of mercy look after the virtuous. A friendly river dragon saves Tiên from drowning, and a fairy leads him out of the cave. Finally, through the help of a woodcutter, he ends up in a pagoda, where the narrator allows him to rest while recounting the misfortunes of the heroine Nga.

Nga, still pining for Tiên ever since he gallantly rescued her, learns from her father (mistakenly as it turns out) that he has died from sickness. She vows to remain chaste and loyal forever in his memory. Keeping her vow is not easy because she has other suitors, one of whom, when spurned, seeks revenge by influencing the King of Sở to have her offered as a tribute wife to the King of Phiên, a country that has been harassing the country of Sở. Nga then must choose between two virtues: faithfulness to Tiên, whom she regards as her husband even though they were never formally betrothed, and loyalty to her King, who has ordered her to become the wife of a foreign king. Unable to resolve this dilemma, she attempts suicide by jumping off the boat taking her to the land of Phiên. She is saved by the Buddhist Goddess of Mercy (Guanyin, Phật Bà Quan Âm), who removes her from the water and places her in a garden of flowers. The aging caretaker of the garden befriends her, but when his son (Bùi Kiệm) makes advances, she flees, finally finding refuge in the home of a kind old woman.

The narrator then returns to the adventures of Tiên, who begins to enjoy better fortune. After being blind for six years, he is cured by a fairy who visits him in a dream, bringing him a bowl of magic medicine. His sight restored, he begins his rise to fame and happiness. He reviews his lessons and takes the examinations, passing with the highest rank. At the King's request he leads a successful expedition against the Ô Qua, a neighboring people who have been harassing the land of Sở. After this battle he stumbles upon the old lady's home where Nga has taken refuge. There is a joyful reunion. Later they are happily married and the King of Sở, grateful for Tiên's assistance in driving out the Ô Qua, and himself eager to retire to a pagoda, allows Tiên to take the throne and rule the country. This summary in English proves the maxim "To translate is to betray," not only because the rich elaborating detail and the music of verse are lost but also because it fails to evoke in Western listeners certain prior texts a knowledge of which is essential to proper appreciation.

== Text ==
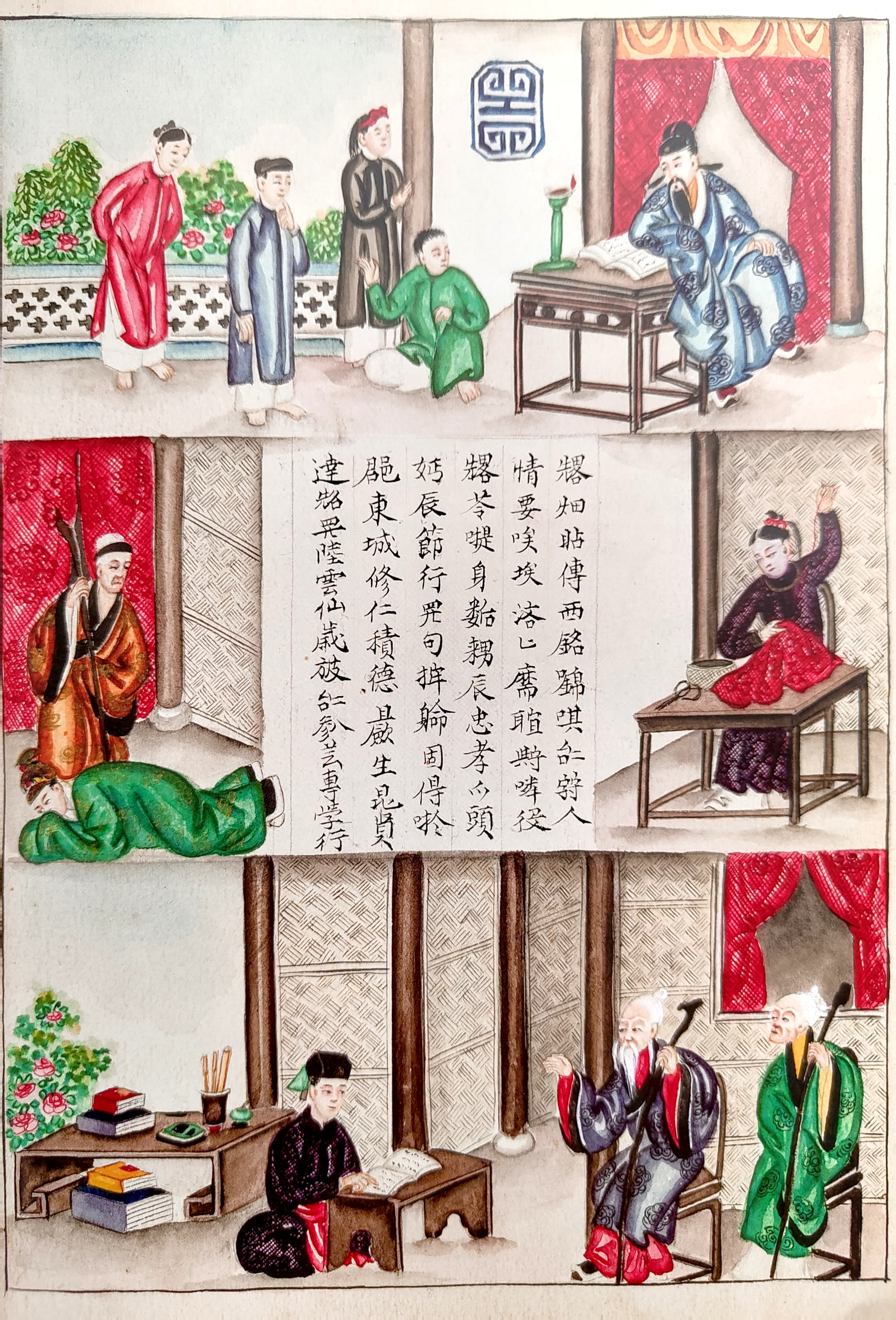
First page of Vân Tiên cổ tích truyện 雲僊古跡傳.

The first six lines of the poem are:

𠓀 炳 䀡 傳 西 銘
Trước đèn xem truyện Tây Minh

唫 唭 𠄩 𡨸 人 情 𢰳 囄
Gẫm cười hai chữ nhân tình éo le

𪠠 埃 𠳺 𣵰 𦓡 𦖑
Hỡi ai lẳng lặng mà nghe

與 𡂰 役 𠓀 𡅐 𠽮 身 𪢈
Dữ răn việc trước, lành dè thân sau

𤳆 𥱯 忠 孝 𪵯 頭
Trai thời trung hiếu làm đầu

𡛔 𥱯 節 行 羅 句 𤶎 𨉟
Gái thời tiết hạnh là câu trau mình
