= Ba Lai River =

River in Vietnam

Coordinates: 10.02861°N 106.69167°E

The Ba Lai River (Vietnamese: Sông Ba Lai) is a river in the Mekong Delta region, Vietnam, in Ben Tre Province, flowing between An Hoa Island and Bao Island. It is a direct tributary of the Tien River at the boundary of Phu Duc and Tan Phu Communes. At the beginning of the 20th century, the flow from Tien River began to diminish. The water source of the Ba Lai River now comes mainly from the My Tho River. The Ba Lai River has also begun to diminish and the Ba Lai estuary is now filling with sediment and becoming blocked. In 2002, an irrigation dam was built across the River to stop the infiltration of salt water and preserve fresh water for 100,000 hectares of farmland in Bến Tre.
