= Nguyễn Đình Chiểu =

Vietnamese poet

Nguyễn Đình Chiểu 阮廷炤
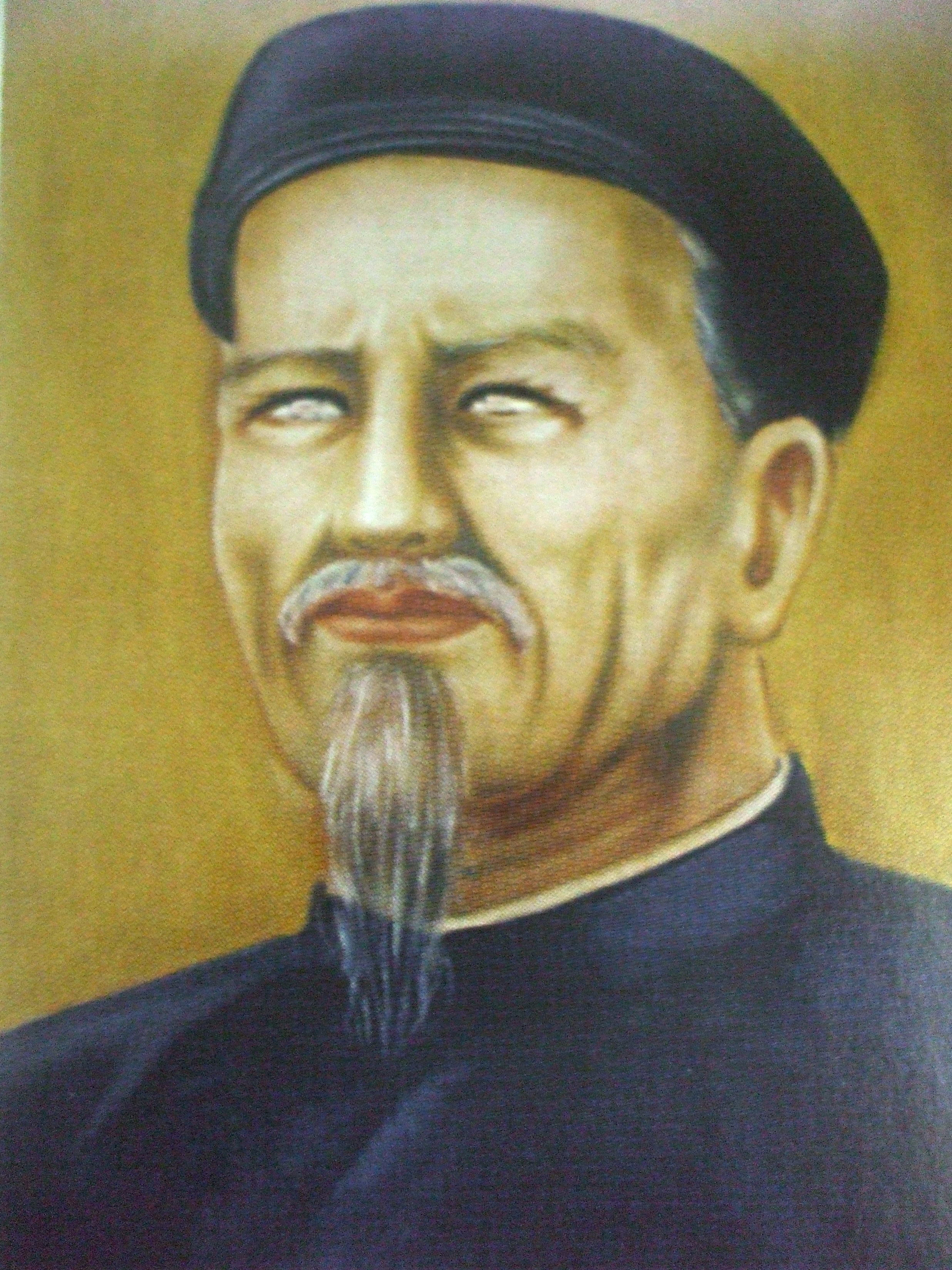
- Nguyễn Đình Chiểu
- Born: 1 July 1822; Gia Định, Viet Nam
- Died: 3 July 1888 (aged 66); Ba Tri, Bến Tre, French Indochina
- Occupation: Poet
- Children: Nguyễn Ngọc Khuê (or Sương Nguyệt Anh)
- Writing career
- Pen name: Trọng Phủ, Hối Trai
- Notable works: Lục Vân Tiên; Dương Từ-Hà Mậu; Văn tế nghĩa sĩ Cần Giuộc; Ngư tiều y thuật vấn đáp

Nguyễn Đình Chiểu (Chữ Hán: 阮廷炤; 1 July 1822 – 3 July 1888) was a Vietnamese poet who was known for his nationalist and anti-colonial writings against the French colonization of Cochinchina, the European name for the southern part of Vietnam.

He was the best known opponent of collaboration in the south of Vietnam and was regarded as the poet laureate of the southerners who continued to defy the Treaty of Saigon which ceded southern Vietnam to France, disobeying the royal orders of Emperor Tự Đức by harassing the French forces. His epic poem, Lục Vân Tiên, remains one of the most celebrated works in Vietnamese literature.

== Life ==
Nguyễn Đình Chiểu was born in the southern province of Gia Định, the location of modern Saigon. He was of gentry parentage; his father was a native of Thừa Thiên–Huế, near Huế; but, during his service to the imperial government of Emperor Gia Long, he was posted south to serve under Lê Văn Duyệt, the governor of the south. There, he took a second wife, who bore him four sons, one of whom was Chiểu.

In 1843, he passed the regional imperial examinations, and in 1846, he traveled to the capital, Huế, for the opening of the metropolitan examinations. However, while in Huế, he was informed of the death of his mother, so he withdrew from the examinations and returned to Gia Định. However, on the journey south, he contracted an eye infection and was soon completely blind. In spite of his disability, he opened a small school in Gia Định and was soon in high demand as both a teacher and a medical practitioner.

=== Flight to Bến Tre ===
In 1859, the French started the conquest of Cochinchina and attacked Gia Định. As a result, Chiểu fled south to the Mekong Delta region of Bến Tre. His blindness prevented Chiểu from making a physical contribution to the guerrilla efforts of the likes of Trương Định, the leading southern anticolonial. Chiểu was known for his vivid and highly proficient writing of poetry of chữ nôm, which was widely circulated in the south, mainly by word of mouth.

In 1862, Emperor Tự Đức's court signed the Treaty of Saigon, which ceded three southern provinces to become the colony of Cochinchina. Đình and his colleagues refused to recognize the treaty and continued to fight on against the French, thereby disobeying Tự Đức and being in violation of the will of the Mandate of Heaven.

Chiểu did not portray Định as a rebel opposed to the Huế court. In an elegy to the fallen insurgents, Chiểu asserted that the resistance continued its struggle after the signing of the treaty by Huế "because their hearts would not heed the Son of Heaven's edict". Chiểu strongly supported the partisans’ efforts in continuing their attempt to expel the French from southern Vietnam, a cause he considered righteous, yet his reference to Tự Đức as the "Son of Heaven" indicate that the legitimacy of the Emperor was not called into question.

The resistance petered away after Định was surrounded and committed suicide in 1864 to avoid capture. In 1867, the French seized a further three provinces to complete their colonization of the south, using the pretext that the Nguyễn court was secretly assisting southern rebels and thereby disrespecting the Treaty of Saigon.

Long after the collapse of the southern resistance, Chiểu remained with a small group of students in Bến Tre. He continued to write poetry despite his works having been banned by the French regime. He refused to cooperate with the colonial system and shunned it. When an official of the French authorities offered him the land that had been taken from his family plot in Gia Định, he was reported to have sardonically replied, "When our common land, our country has been lost, how it is possible to have individual land?" Chiểu continued his writing, which was known for its praise of Định and his resistance colleagues, his condemnations of Roman Catholicism and the Vietnamese Catholics who collaborated with the French in subjugating Vietnam and his advocacy of traditional Vietnamese language.

== Works ==
Aside from various individual poems, pamphlets and essays, his major works are:

- Lục Vân Tiên – narrative poem, (truyện thơ) written in Nôm, begun in 1851, transmitted in writing and orally. First printing in China in 1864.
- Dương Từ-Hà Mậu – narrative poem (truyện thơ) written in Nôm, begun in 1854. First printing Saigon 1964.
- Vǎn tế nghĩa sĩ Cần Giuộc (Eulogy for the Righteous People of Cần Giuộc)
- Ngư Tiều vấn đáp nho y diễn ca – Treatise on Chinese medicine, circa 1867

== Influence ==
Chiểu's influence on morale-building and patriotic sentiment was felt long after the military defeat of the popular resistance. His poetry remained popular into the 20th century, particularly in the Mekong Delta where it continued to be circulated. Most cities in Vietnam have named major streets after him.

His granddaughter was the writer and poet Mai Huỳnh Hoa (1910–1987). Her husband, the Trotskyist, Phan Văn Hùm (1902–1945) published a popular study and selection of Chiểu's work in 1938 in Saigon (Nỗi lòng Đồ Chiểu), where his granddaughter assisted with a second edition in 1957.

== Gallery ==
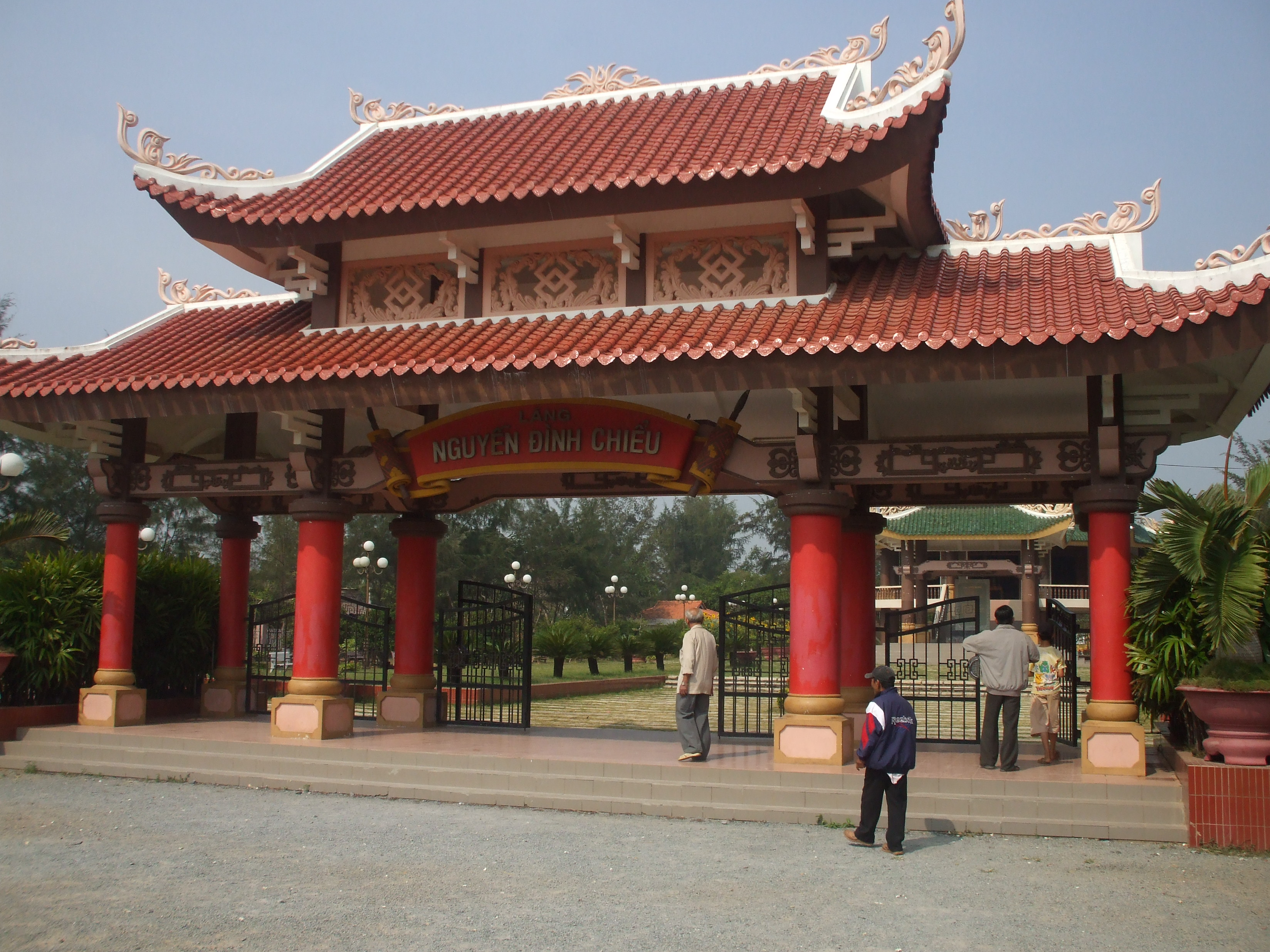
Entrance gate to the temple relics and Nguyễn Đình Chiểu's tomb in An Đức commune, Ba Tri, Bến Tre.

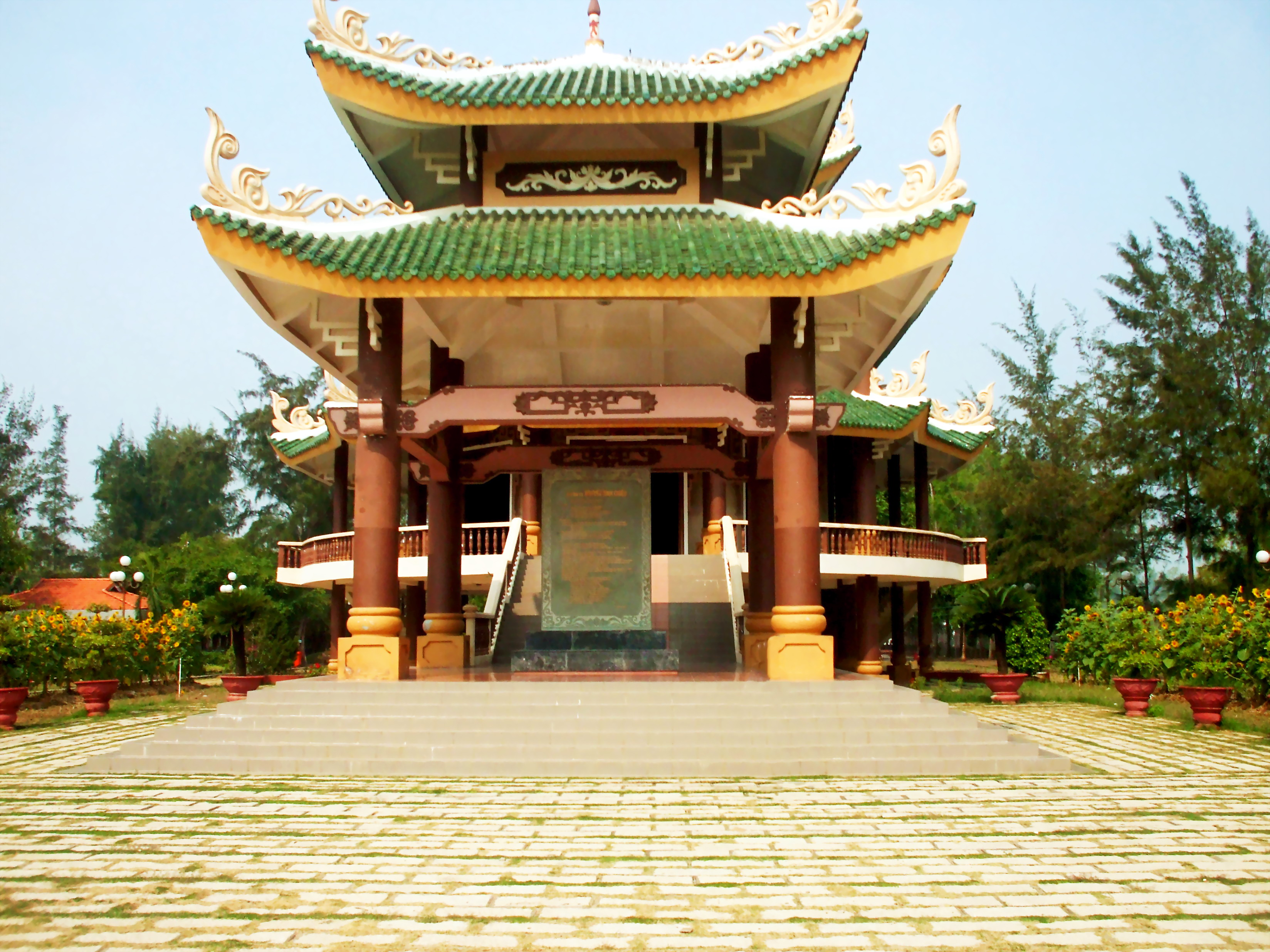
Nguyễn Đình Chiểu Temple in the temple tomb area.

=== References ===
- Marr, David G. (1970). Vietnamese anticolonialism, 1885–1925. Berkeley, California: University of California. ISBN 0-520-01813-3.
- McLeod, Mark (March 1993). "Truong Dinh and Vietnamese anti-colonialism, 1859–64: a reappraisal". Journal of Southeast Asian Studies. 24 (1): 88–106. doi:10.1017/S002246340000151X. S2CID 159512539.
