= Ba Tri =

Ba Tri Phường Ba Tri
- Ward
- Location in Vietnam
- Coordinates: 10.045556°N 106.596667°E
- Country: Vietnam
- Province: Vĩnh Long Province
- Time zone: UTC+7 (UTC+7)

Ba Tri is a ward (phường) of Vĩnh Long Province, Vietnam.
