= Giải âm =

Vietnamese translations of Classical Chinese

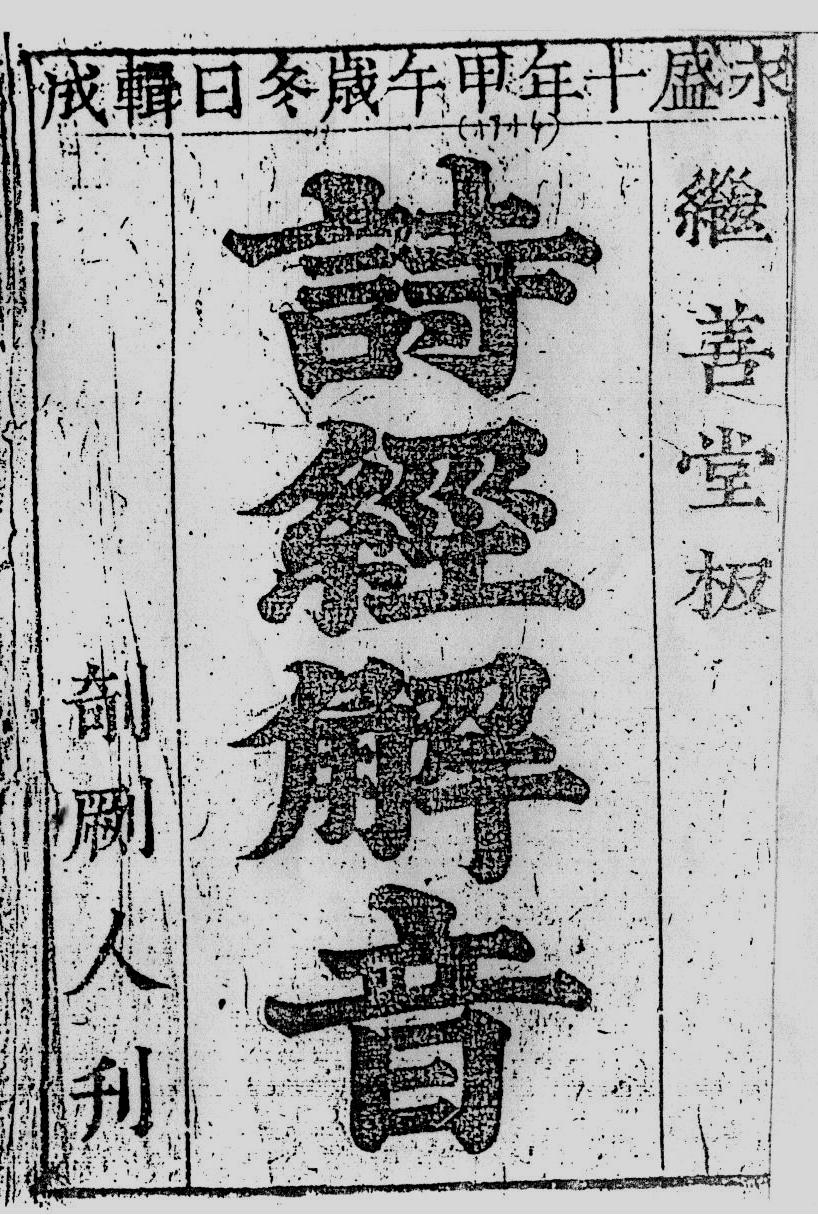
- The book cover of Thi kinh giải âm 詩經解音 (1714).
- Vietnamese alphabet: giải âm
- Chữ Hán: 解音

Giải âm (Vietnamese pronunciation: [zâːj ʔʌ̄m], chữ Hán: 解音) refers to Literary Vietnamese translations of texts originally written in Literary Chinese. These translations encompass a wide spectrum, ranging from brief glosses that explain individual terms or phrases to comprehensive translations that adapt entire texts for a Vietnamese reader. Works translated into Vietnamese include Chinese classics, such as the Analects (Luận ngữ uớc giải; 論語約解), as well as native Vietnamese Classical Chinese literature, such as Truyền kỳ mạn lục (Tân biên Truyền kỳ mạn lục tăng bổ giải âm tập chú; 新編傳奇漫錄增補解音集註).

== Etymology ==
The term giải âm (解音) literally meaning 'to explain sounds.' It refers to translations of Literary Chinese texts into Literary Vietnamese, with an emphasis on preserving the original syntax while providing Vietnamese equivalents for the Chinese characters.

Âm (音) is a clipping of the term quốc âm (國音; "national pronunciation"), (Note: Quốc ngữ (國語) was also used to refer to Vietnamese, but during French control, the meaning shifted to the Vietnamese alphabet rather than chữ Nôm.) which was used to refer to the Vietnamese language. This can be seen in the full book titles such as Tứ thư ước giải Trung Dung giải quốc âm nghĩa tăng bổ đại toàn bị chỉ (四書約解中庸解國音義增補大全備旨) or Phật tử an thiền giải quốc âm lục chương (佛子安禪觧國音六章).

Translations of texts can be referred to by several terms, including:

- giải âm (解音)
- diễn âm (演音)
- ước giải (約解)

Another related term, giải nghĩa (解義), literally meaning 'to explain meaning,' refers to translations that prioritize conveying the meaning of the text without adhering to the original word order. This approach places greater emphasis on semantic meaning of the source text.

- giải nghĩa (解義)
- diễn nghĩa (演義)
- thích nghĩa (釋義)

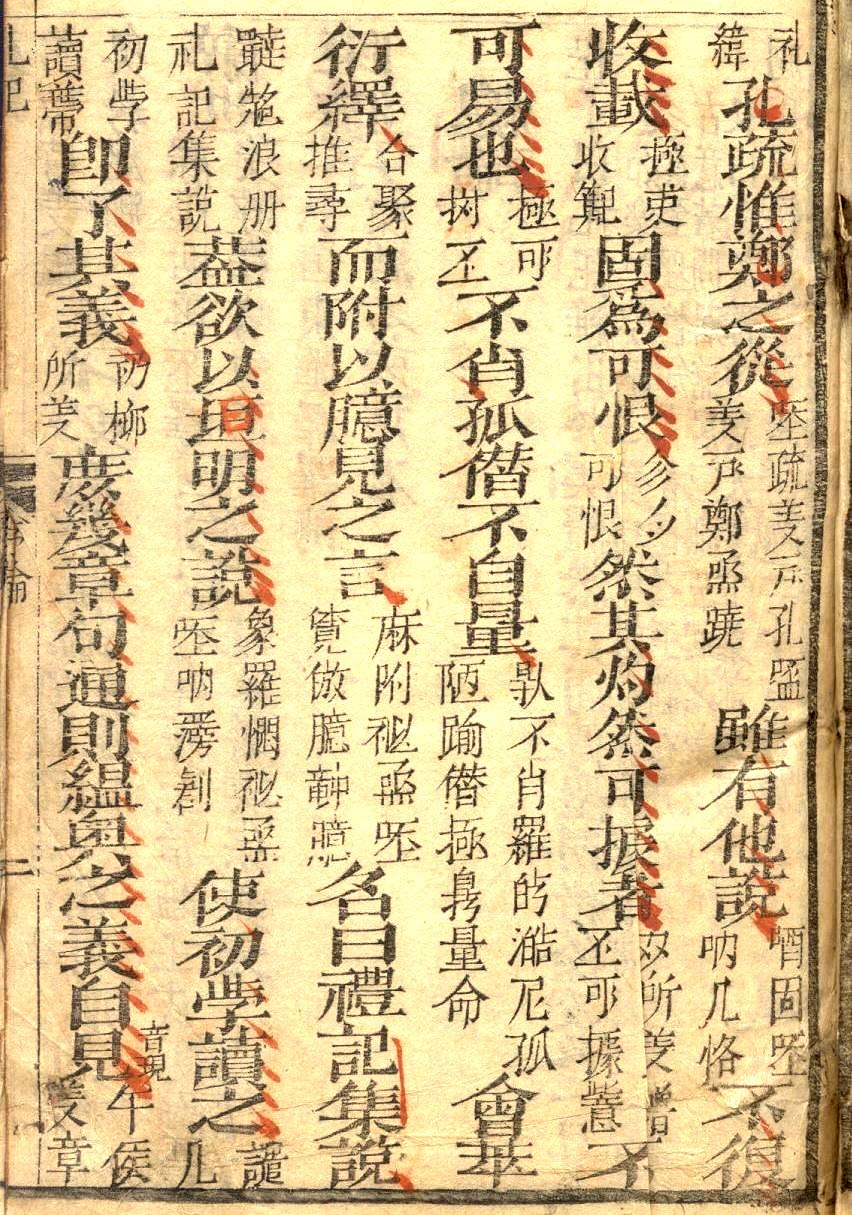
A page from the first volume of Lễ ký đại toàn tiết yếu diễn nghĩa 禮記大全節要演義.

== History ==
The earliest extant Vietnamese text with bilingual translation is Phật thuyết đại báo phụ mẫu ân trọng kinh (佛說大報父母恩重經), dated to either the twelfth or fifteenth century. This text features an Old Vietnamese translation alongside the original Classical Chinese. The Vietnamese translation uses obsolete vocabulary and linguistic features that were characteristic of the period, providing valuable insight into the development of the Vietnamese language at the time.

Another notable translation work is Quốc ngữ thi nghĩa (國語詩義; 1396) which was written by Hồ Quý Ly (胡季犛; 1336–1407), it was a translation of the Classic of Poetry (詩經) into Vietnamese. It was lost during the Fourth Era of Northern Domination.

The excerpt about Hồ Quý Ly's work from the Complete Annals of Đại Việt (Đại Việt sử ký toàn thư; 大越史記全書):

十一月、季犛作國語詩義幷序、令女師教后妃及宮人學習、序中多出己意、不從朱子集傳。

Thập nhất nguyệt, Quý Ly tác Quốc ngữ Thi nghĩa tịnh tự, lệnh nữ sư giáo hậu phi cập cung nhân học tập, tự trung đa xuất kỷ ý, bất tòng Chu Tử tập truyện.

Tháng mười một, Quý Ly làm sách Quốc ngữ Thi nghĩa và bài tựa, sai nữ sư dạy hậu phi và cung nhân học tập. Bài tựa phần nhiều theo ý mình, không theo tập truyện của Chu Tử.

In the eleventh month, Hồ Quý Ly composed Quốc ngữ Thi nghĩa with a preface, ordering female teachers to instruct the empress, concubines, and palace attendants in studying it. In the preface, many of his own ideas were expressed, diverging from Zhu Xi's collected commentaries.

— Đại Việt sử ký toàn thư 大越史記全書, volume 8 卷之八

Books continued to be translated into Vietnamese well into the Nguyễn dynasty, with notable examples such as:

- Thượng dụ huấn điều sao bản giải âm (上諭訓條抄本解音; 1834) - A giải âm translation of Huấn địch thập điều (訓迪十條), a set of ten moral and disciplinary principles issued by Emperor Minh Mạng (明命) in 1834.
- Chư kinh diễn âm (諸經演音; 1900) - A diễn âm translation of several Buddhist sutras such as Amitābha Sūtra (阿彌陀經), Cause and Effect Sūtra (因果經), etc.

The preface of Chu dịch quốc âm ca quyết (周易國音歌訣; 1815) states,

…我越之與諸華。學同而音異。老儒先生。往往演爲國音。取便初學。如詩經解義。固已行於世矣…余故曰訓詁之流也…今聖明在上。治教方隆。公卿大夫皆貴文學。大學衍義。與集史繤要諸書。次第印行。而是書繼之...

...Ngã Việt chi dữ chư Hoa, học đồng nhi âm dị. Lão Nho tiên sinh, vãng vãng diễn vi quốc âm. Thủ tiện sơ học. Như Thi kinh giải nghĩa, cố dĩ hành ư thế hĩ ... Dư cố viết huấn cổ chi lưu dã ... Kim thánh minh tại thượng. Trị giáo phương long. Công khanh đại phu giai quý văn học. Đại học diễn nghĩa. Dữ Tập sử toản yếu chư thư. Thứ đệ ấn hành. Nhi thị thư kế chi...

...Việt ta với nước Hoa, học thì giống mà phát âm thì khác. Các Lão Nho tiên sinh, thường dịch ra quốc âm. Để tiện lợi cho người mới học. Như quyển Thi kinh giải nghĩa thì đã lưu hành rộng rãi trong đời vậy ... Ta vậy nói rằng sách này thuộc loại huấn cổ ... Nay thánh minh ngự trị, trị dạy đang thịnh. Công khanh, đại phu đều coi trọng văn học. Các sách như Đại học diễn nghĩa và Tập sử toản yếu lần lượt được khắc in. Sách này cũng nối tiếp theo sau...

...Our Vietnam (越; Việt), when compared with China (華; Hoa), our studies are the same, but our pronunciations differ. Old scholars here often adapt the texts into the national pronunciation (國音; Quốc âm, Vietnamese) for the convenience of beginners. For example, the Explanation of the Odes (詩經解義; Thi kinh giải nghĩa) has already been circulated widely ... Thus, I call this work a continuation of the tradition of exegesis (訓詁之流; huấn cổ chi lưu) ... Now, under the reign of a sagacious ruler, governance and education are flourishing. Officials, noblemen, and scholars all value literature and learning. Works such as The Explanation of the Great Learning (大學衍義; Đại học diễn nghĩa) and The Essentials of Historical Compilations (集史繤要; Tập sử toản yếu) have been successively printed and disseminated. This book follows in their wake...

— Phạm Lập Trai 范立齋, Chu dịch quốc âm ca quyết 周易國音歌訣, Preface 序

The preface of Tứ thư ước giải (四書約解) written by Lê Quý Đôn also states that the spoken languages in Vietnam and China differ thus the need for translations was necessary:

…况我國音語又與中國不同、教之尤有難者。是故先代師儒、演方土之音為四書約解、增補大全備旨、豪釐秒忽無所不用其力焉...

...Huống ngã quốc âm ngữ hựu dữ Trung Quốc bất đồng, giáo chi vưu hữu nan giả. Thị cố tiên đại sư Nho, diễn phương thổ chi âm vi Tứ thư ước giải, tăng bổ đại toàn bị chỉ, hào li miểu hốt vô sở bất dụng kỳ công lực yên...

...Huống hồ, tiếng quốc âm nước ta lại khác với Trung Quốc, việc dạy dỗ lại càng khó. Vậy nên các bậc tiên Nho mới diễn ra âm bản địa làm bộ Tứ thư ước giải tăng bổ đại toàn bị chỉ, để tâm sức tới cả những điều nhỏ bé nhất...

...Moreover, our country’s language and pronunciation differ from China’s, making the teaching even more difficult. Therefore, past generations of scholars meticulously adapted the regional pronunciation to compile the Tứ thư ước giải tăng bổ đại toàn bị chỉ (四書約解增補大全備旨), striving to clarify and expand upon every detail, focusing even on the smallest things...

— Lê Quý Đôn 黎貴惇, Tứ thư ước giải 四書約解, Preface 序

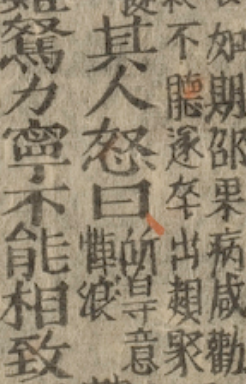
An example of giải âm translation of 其人怒曰 (Kỳ nhân nộ viết; that person angrily said): 所㝵意𢚷浪 (Thửa người ấy giận rằng).

== Examples ==
An example of simple vernacular glossing can be found in Tam thiên tự giải âm (三千字解音). In this text, the Chinese characters are organized into four-character verses, with their equivalents in chữ Nôm provided in smaller print alongside.

天_{𡗶} 地_{坦} 舉_{拮} 存_{群} 子_{𡥵} 孫_{𡥙} 六_{𦒹} 三_{𠀧}
thiên_{trời} địa_{đất} cử_{cất} tồn_{còn} tử_{con} tôn_{cháu} lục_{sáu} tam_{ba}

In comparison, comprehensive translations such as the one found in Lễ ký đại toàn tiết yếu diễn nghĩa (禮記大全節要演義), a translation of the Book of Rites (禮記),

{寡人} 聞 之
{Quả nhân} văn chi
I hear it
"I heard it"

{几𠃝德} 尼 𠻵 㗂 蒂
{Kẻ ít đức} này mắng tiếng đấy
{person of little virtue (I)} this hear sound that
"This person of little virtue heard that sound"

In this example, the Classical Chinese term, 寡人 (a humble word for "I"; literally "person of few [virtue]") is translated into Vietnamese as 几𠃝德 (a person of little virtue; kẻ ít đức). The rest of the sentence is translated with its equivalent word. The Classical Chinese sentence reads as "I heard it", while the Vietnamese sentence reads "This person of little virtue heard that sound"

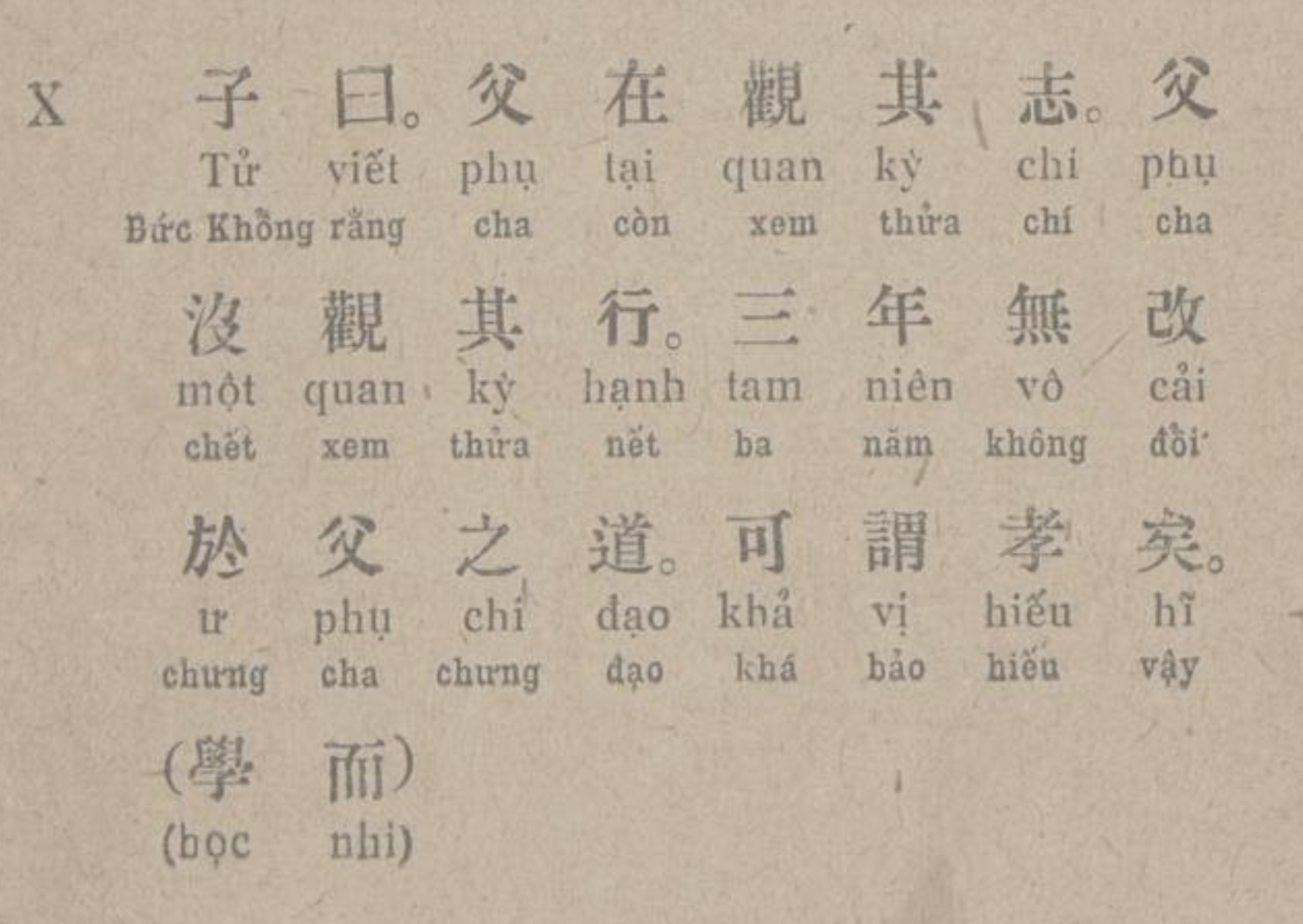
A modern translation of the Analects from Luân ngữ loại ngữ (1927). The words chưng and thửa can still be seen as translations of 之 and 其.

A prominent line from Classic of Filial Piety (孝經; Hiếu Kinh),

{身體} 髮 膚、 受 之 父母、 不 敢 毀 傷、 孝 之 始 也。
{Thân thể} phát phu, thụ chi {phụ mẫu}, bất cảm huỷ thương, hiếu chi thuỷ dã.
Body hair skin receive POSS parents {do not} dare destroy injure {filial piety} POSS beginning COP
"The body, hair, and skin—are received from one's parents—one must not dare to harm or injure them—[this is the] beginning of filial piety"

𨉟𫃚 𩯀 䏧、 𠹾 蒸 吒媄、 拯 敢 涅 害、 𧘇 𦉼 孝 蒸 𠓀 丕。
{Mình vóc} tóc da, chịu chưng {cha mẹ}, chẳng dám nát hại, ấy là hiếu chưng trước vậy.
{Body} hair skin, receive POSS parents, {do not} dare break harm, that is {filial piety} POSS beginning COP
"The body, hair, and skin—are received from one's parents—one must not dare to harm or injure them—this is the beginning of filial piety"

=== Chưng ===
Chưng (蒸) is an obsolete Vietnamese particle (inside Vietnamese translations) (Note: Outside of Vietnamese translations, chưng 蒸 functions as a preposition in regular Vietnamese texts.) commonly used to translate Classical Chinese terms such as: 夫 phù, 之 chi, 於 ư, 諸 chư, etc. Chưng, originally used pronominally gained additional functions as a result of exegetical translation of Literary Chinese.

Washizawa outlines the meanings of the particle chưng as follows:

| Function | Literary Chinese Equivalent |
|---|---|
| Subject-Predicate modifier | chi 之 |
| Preposition | ư 於, vu 于 |
| Sentence initial particle | phù 夫, phàm 凡 |
| Pronoun | chi 之 |
| “Meaningless particle” | chi 之 |
| Definite article (-like) | (kỳ 其) |

==== Subject-Predicate modifier ====
父子 之 綱、 又 安在 哉。
{Phụ tử} chi cương hựu {an tại} tai
{father and son} POSS rope moreover where FP
"The bond (relationship) of father and son, where is it now?"

蒸 𦀚 吒昆、 吏 於兠 丕台。
Chưng giềng {cha con} lại {ở đâu} {vậy thay}
POSS rope {father and son} again where FP
"The bond (relationship) of father and son, where is it now?"

Here, the Classical Chinese structure A 之 B becomes 蒸 B A (similar to Modern Vietnamese, B genitive A).

==== Preposition ====
得 國 恒 於 斯
Đắc quốc hằng ư tư
obtain country ordinary PREP this
"Gaining a country is common through these (times)"

特 渃 拱 常 於 蒸 欺 尼 意
Được nước cũng thường ở chưng khi này ấy
obtain country also usual at PREP when this that
"Gaining the country is also common during such times"

==== Sentence initial particle ====
夫 政 也 者， {蒲盧} 也。
Phù chính dã giả, {bồ lô} dã.
PTCL governance STV NOM, reeds COP.
"Moreover, their government might be called an easily-growing rush."

蒸 政 意 丕， 易 𢧚 如 𣘃 蒲盧 丕。
Chưng chính ấy vậy, dễ nên như cây {bồ lô} vậy.
PTCL governance that STV, easy accomplish like CLF {reeds} COP.
"Oh, that government indeed, [it] easily grows like the reeds."

==== Pronoun ====
{若夫} 天曹 之 遊， 其 有 其 無， 何必 深 辨。
{Nhược phù} {thiên tào} chi du, kỳ hữu kỳ vô, {hà tất} thâm biện?
{as for} {celestial court} POSS play, 3.POSS have 3.POSS empty, {why must} deep dispute?
As for that [matter], [going up to] play in the celestial court, whether it exists or does not exist, why one must dispute deeply about that?

{朋烝} 制 准 天曹， 所 固 所 空， 牢乙 瀋 盤泊。
{Bằng chưng} chơi chốn {thiên tào}, thửa có thửa không, {sao ắt} thẳm {bàn bạc}?
{as for} play place {celestial court}, 3.POSS have 3.POSS empty, {why must} deep discuss
As for that [matter], [going up to] play in the celestial court, whether it exists or does not exist, why one must discuss this so deeply?

==== Weak demonstrative ====
潜 覬 其 所為。
Tiềm ký kỳ {sở vi}.
hidden look 3.POSS {what one does}
"Secretly looking at what they were doing."

耨 𥉰 蒸 所𫜵 之。
Náu dòm chưng {thửa làm} chi.
hide look 3.POSS {what one does} what.
"Secretly looking at what they were doing."

For the weak demonstrative sense, chưng is only used to translate 其 whenever 其 is placed close to 所 grammatically. Functions similarly to when chưng is used to translate phù 夫 (pronoun).

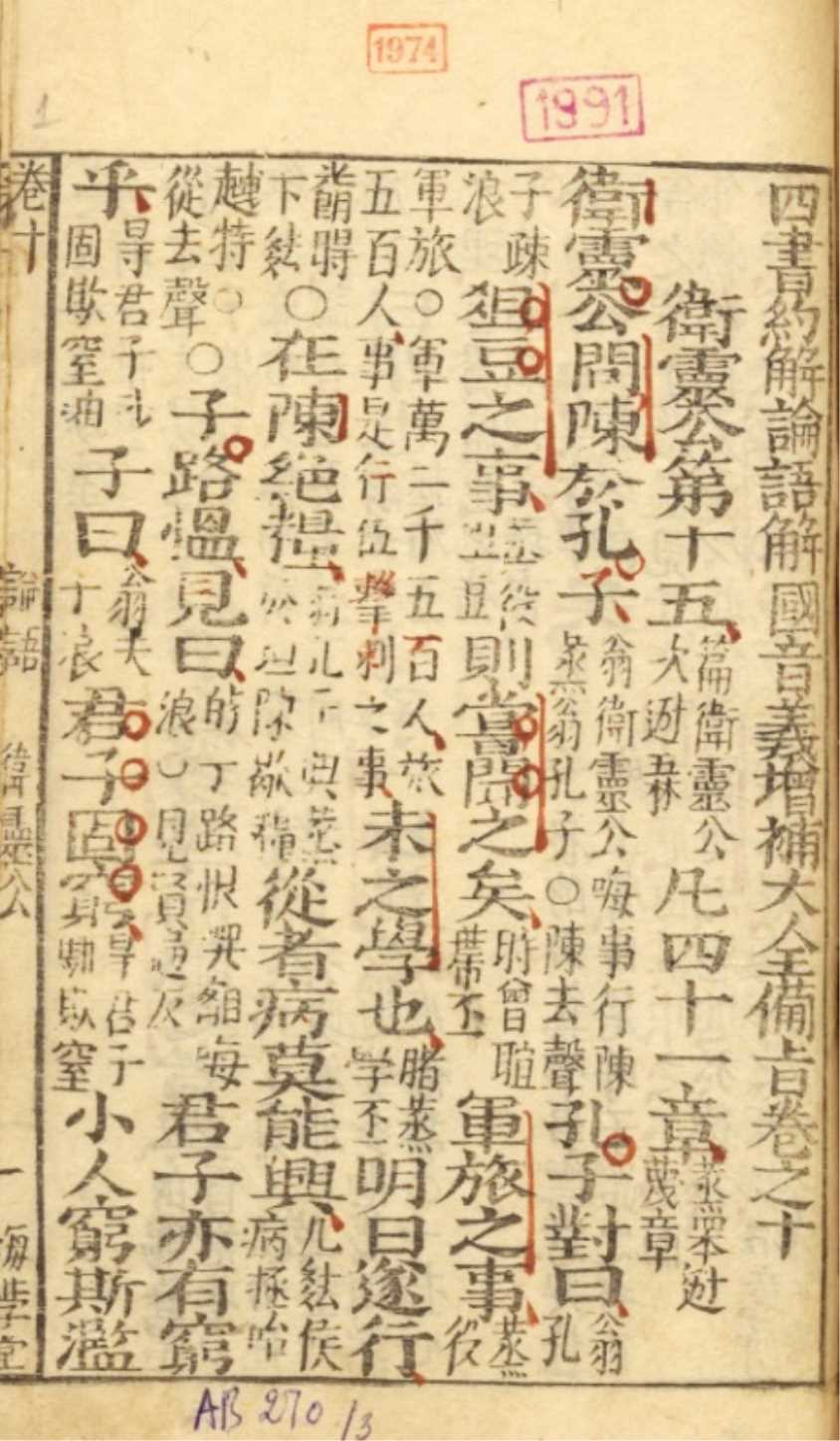
Tứ thư ước giải 四書約解, a translation of the Four Books. Chưng 蒸 can be seen used to translate phàm 凡 and chi 之.

=== Thửa ===
Thửa (所) is an obsolete Vietnamese particle used to translate Classical Chinese terms such as: 其 kỳ, 所 sở, 厥 quyết, etc.

| Function | Literary Chinese Equivalent |
|---|---|
| Demonstrative | kỳ 其 |
| Pronoun | kỳ 其, quyết 厥 |
| Nominalizer | sở 所 |
| Place | sở 所, du 攸 |

==== Demonstrative ====
鄭 見 其 人
Trịnh kiến kỳ nhân
Trịnh saw DEM person
"Trịnh saw that person."

官 太守 体 所 㝵 意
Quan {Thái thú} thấy thửa người ấy
{official} {governor} saw DEM person that
"The governor saw that person."

This function of the word acts similarly to English the or that.

==== Pronoun ====
公 見 其 言 頗 有 理
Công kiến kỳ ngôn phả hữu lí
sir see 3.POSS say very {there is} reason
"Sir (he) found what he (Phạm) said very reasonable"

𤽗 {宗鷟} 体 所 𠅜 呐 𡲤 固 理
Ngươi {Tông Thốc} thấy thửa lời nói vả có lí
FOC {Tông Thốc} see 3.POSS word say very {there is} reason
"Tông Thốc saw (that) his words which he said were very reasonable"

In this example, thửa is being used as a pronoun to refer to his words.

Another example using 厥 quyết,

播 厥 百 穀
Bá quyết bách cốc
plant 3.POSS hundred grain
"To plant all of your grains"

槞 所 𤾓 種 穭
Trồng thửa trăm giống lúa
plant 3.POSS hundred variety grain
"To plant all of your various grains"

==== Nominalizer ====
汝曹 所 樂、 吾 心 自 羞。
{Nhữ tào} sở lạc ngô tâm tự tu
{you all} NZ pleasure I heart self shame
"What pleasure you all take in, my heart is ashamed of itself."

衆眉 所 𢝙、 𢚸 些 擬 虎。
{Chúng mày} thửa vui lòng ta nghỉ hổ
{you all} NZ pleasure heart I self shame
"What pleasure you all take in, my heart is ashamed of itself."

Here thửa being used as a nominalizer which acts similarly to modern Vietnamese sự or điều.

==== Place ====
君子 有 攸 往
{Quân tử} hữu du vãng
{Junzi} have place go
"The junzi has a place to go to."

㝵 君子 固 所 𠫾
Người {quân tử} có thửa đi
CLF {junzi} have place go
"The junzi has a place to go to."

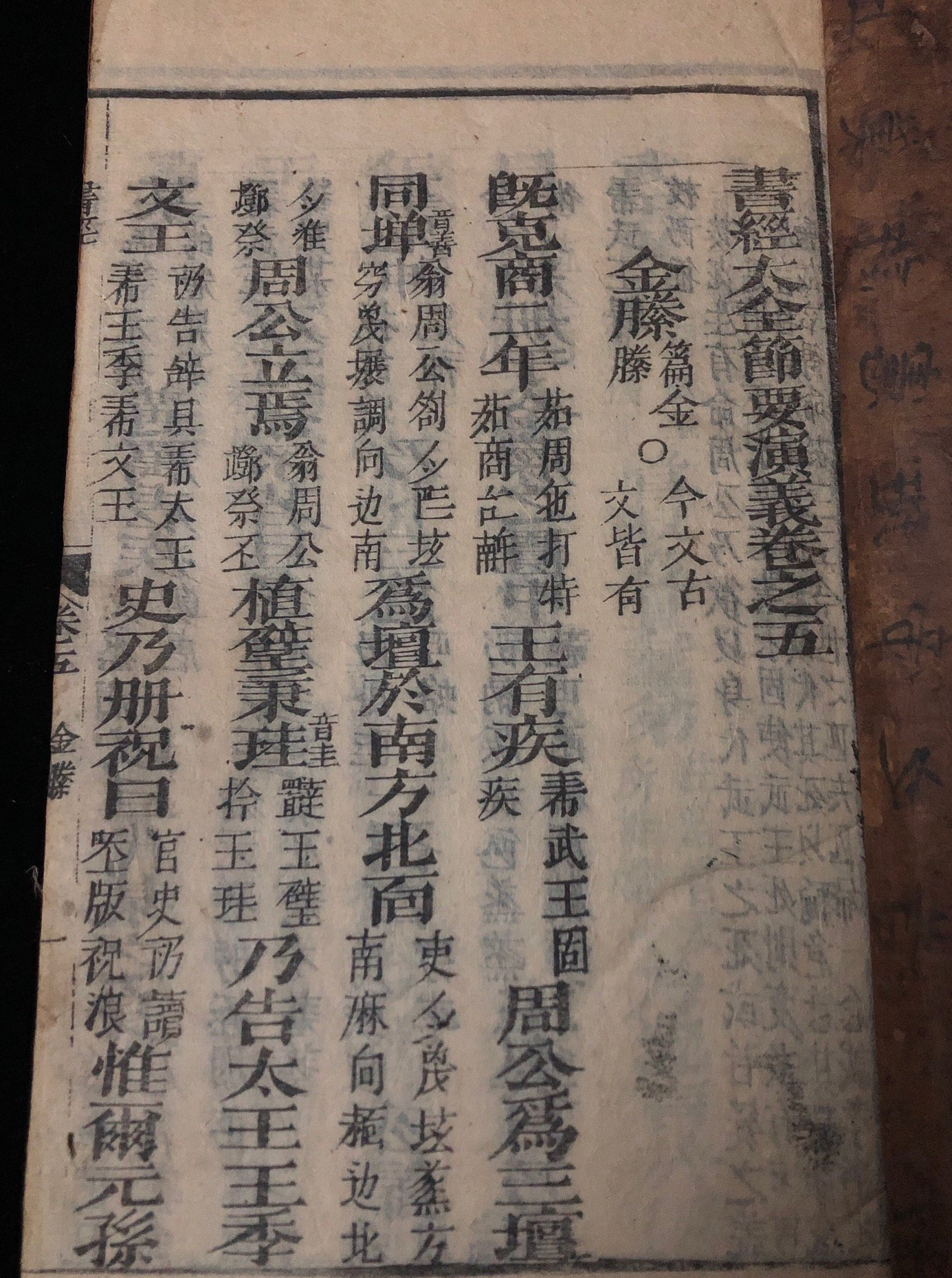
Thư kinh đại toàn tiết yếu diễn nghĩa (書經大全節要演義), a translation of the Book of Documents (書經).

=== Translations of vocabulary ===
Here are some translations of function words (Vietnamese: hư từ; 虛詞), these words may contain obsolete vocabulary that is not used in Modern Vietnamese. Some of these words may be written with different characters as chữ Nôm was never standardised.

Negation
| Vietnamese | Classical Chinese |
|---|---|
| chẳng 拯 | 不 bất |
| chẳng 拯 | 無 vô |
| chớ 渚 | 毋 vô |
| chớ 渚 | 弗 phất |
| mựa 𱐾 | 勿 vật |
| chăng 庄 | 莫 mạc |

Conjunction
| Vietnamese | Classical Chinese |
|---|---|
| mà 麻 | 而 nhi |
| vả 𡲤 | 且 thả |
| bèn 卞 | 乃 nãi |
| cũng 拱 | 亦 diệc |
| thì/thời 時 | 則 tắc |
| bằng 朋 | 若 nhược |
| mặc 黙 | 以 dĩ |

Preposition
| Vietnamese | Classical Chinese |
|---|---|
| chưng 蒸 | 於 ư |
| bởi 𪽝 | 自 tự |
| lấy 𥙩 | 以 dĩ |

Particles
| Vietnamese | Classical Chinese |
|---|---|
| vậy 丕 | 也 dã |
| vậy 丕 | 矣 hĩ |
| ru 𠱋 | 乎 hồ |
| vậy 丕 | 焉 yên |
| thay 台 | 哉 tai |
| ấy 意 | 者 giả |

Interrogative
| Vietnamese | Classical Chinese |
|---|---|
| sao 牢 | 何 hà |
| ở đâu 於兠 | 安在 an tại |
| sao chưng 牢蒸 | 惡乎 ô hồ |
| bao nhiêu 包饒 | 幾多 kỉ đa |

Modal
| Vietnamese | Classical Chinese |
|---|---|
| ắt 乙 | 必 tất |
| hợp 合 | 當 đương |
| khá 可 | 可 khả |
| hay 咍 | 能 năng |

== Gloss reading ==
Similar to Japanese Kanbun Kundoku (漢文訓読) and Korean Kugyŏl (口訣), Vietnam also used a system to annotate Classical Chinese texts into readable Vietnamese albeit rarely. Marks such as ン and ソ were used to invert the word order to match Vietnamese grammar. The marks are also primarily placed on the right side unlike Japanese and Korean marks.

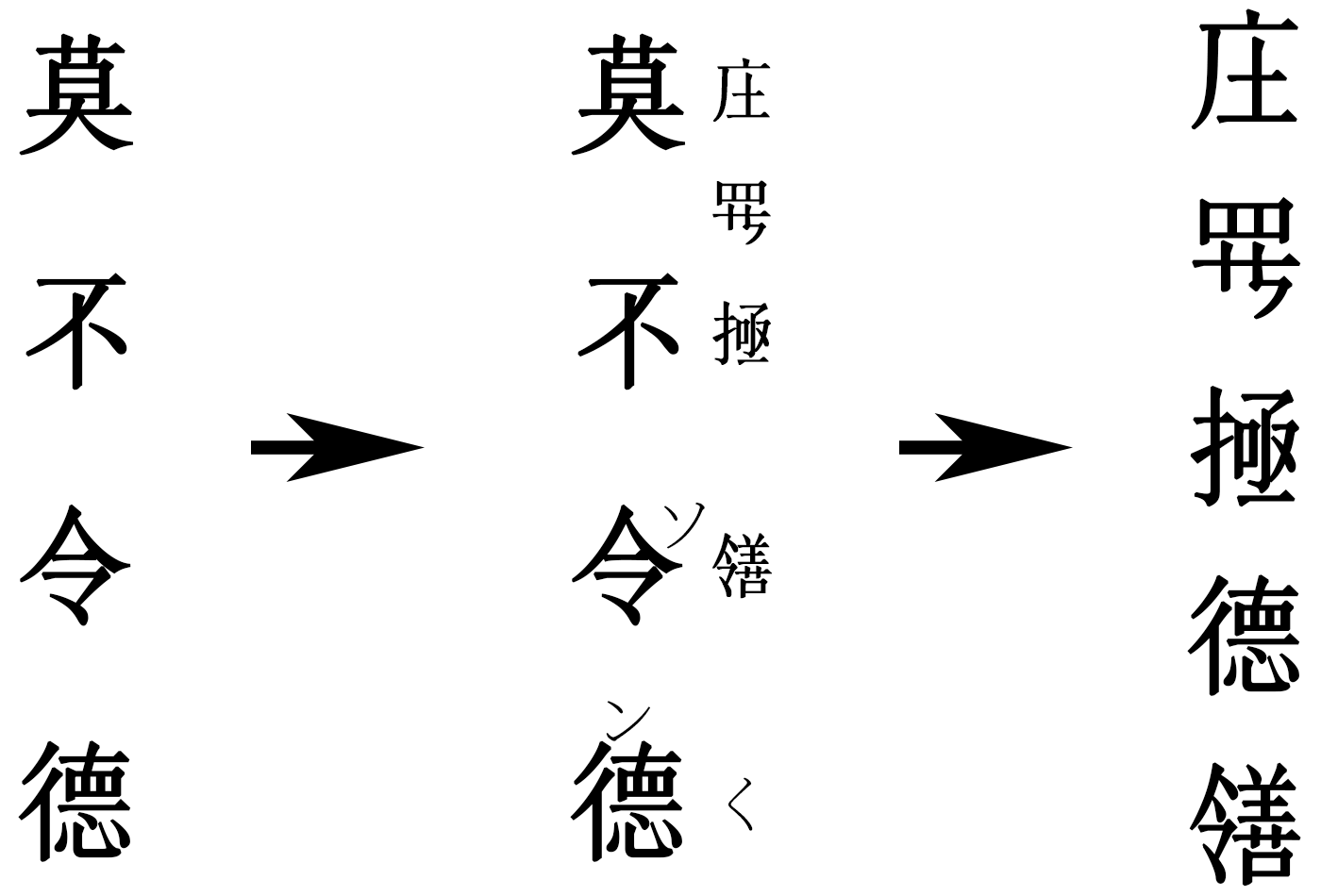
Example of Vietnamese gloss reading from the Classic of Poetry. The line is from the poem 湛露 Zhan Lu, 莫不令德 mạc bất lệnh đức is read as "Chăng là chẳng có đức lành" (庄𱺵𫽄固德𫅜) There was no one who didn't have good virtue.

An example from the Classic of Poetry, this poem is most well known for Cao Cao's use of its four opening line in his famous poem Short Song Style (短歌行).

食 野 之 苹
Thực dã chi bình
Eat wild POSS mugwort

The sentence would be annotated with reversal marks as such,

食_{ソ}野之_{ン}苹

Then the sentence would be glossed with chữ Nôm,

咹_{ソ}外内蒸_{ン}蘿蒌藾蕭

Afterwards, the characters are then reversed,

咹蒸蘿蒌藾蕭外内

The final reading would be:

咹 蒸 蘿 蒌 藾蕭 外内
Ăn chưng lá rau {lại tiêu} {ngoài nội}
Eat POSS leaves vegetable mugwort wild
Eating the leaves of wild mugwort.

In this example, 野 and 之苹 switch places. 野 is glossed with ngoài nội (外内), an archaic Vietnamese word meaning "wild". While 之苹 is glossed with chưng lá rau lại tiêu (蒸蘿蒌藾蕭; leaves of Chinese mugwort).

Here is another example:

六月 食 鬱 及 薁、 七月 亨 葵 及 菽。 八月 剝 棗、 十月 穫 稻。
{Lục nguyệt} thực uất cập úc, {thất nguyệt} phanh quỳ cập thúc. {Bát nguyệt} bác tảo, {thập nguyệt} hoạch đạo.
{Sixth month} eat plum and grape, {seventh month} cook mallow and beans. {Eighth month} beat jujube, {tenth month} reap rice

The sentence would be annotated with reversal marks as such,

六_{ソ}月食鬱及薁、七_{ソ}月亨葵及菽。八_{ソ}月剝棗、十_{ソ}月穫稻。

Then the sentence would be glossed with chữ Nôm,

𦒹_{ソ}𣎃咹顆鬱穷顆薁、𬙞_{ソ}𣎃𤒛蒌葵穷蒌菽。𠔭_{ソ}𣎃打𥙩顆棗、𨑮_{ソ}𣎃辰割穭稻。

Afterwards, the characters are then reversed,

𣎃𦒹咹顆鬱穷顆薁、𣎃𬙞𤒛蒌葵穷蒌菽。𣎃𠔭打𥙩顆棗、𣎃𨑮辰割穭稻。

The final reading would be:

𣎃𦒹 咹 顆 鬱 穷 顆 薁、 𣎃𬙞 𤒛 蒌 葵 穷 蒌 菽。 𣎃𠔭 打 𥙩 顆 棗、 𣎃𨑮 辰 割 穭 稻。
{Tháng sáu} ăn trái uất cùng trái úc, {tháng bảy} nấu rau quỳ cùng rau thúc. {Tháng tám} đánh lấy trái tảo, {tháng mười} thì gặt lúa đạo.
{Sixth month} eat fruit plum and fruit grape, {seventh month} cook vegetable mallow and vegetable beans. {Eighth month} hit take fruit jujube, {tenth month} then reap stalk rice.
In the sixth month they eat the plums and grapes, in the seventh, they cook the mallow and pulse. In the eighth, they knock down the dates, in the tenth, they reap the rice.

=== Examples ===
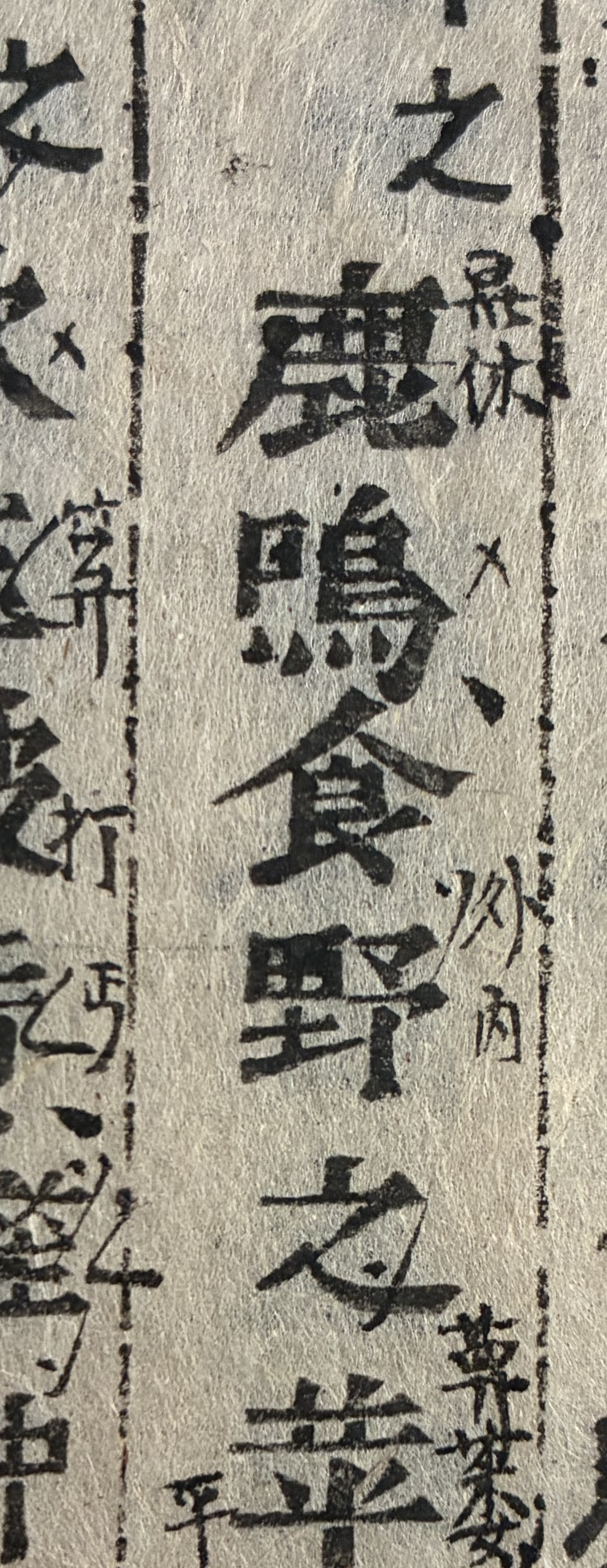
Here, ngoài nội is used to gloss 野. ン can be seen reversing the word order.

Reversal marks can be seen placed between the months to invert the order to match Vietnamese grammar.

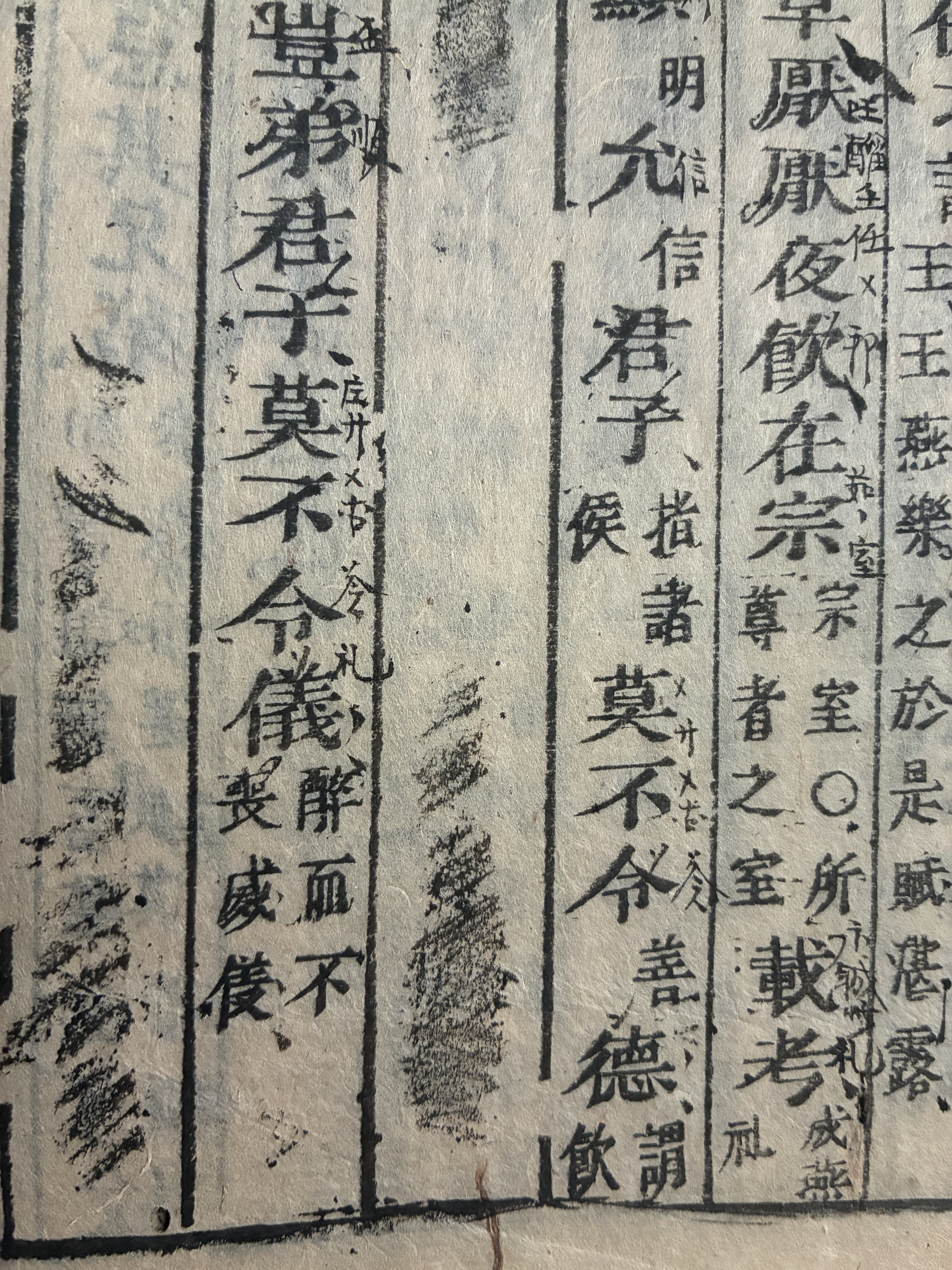
Chăng là chẳng 庄𪜀拯 glossed here on the right and left in Thi kinh đại toàn tiết yếu 詩經大全節要 (1846).

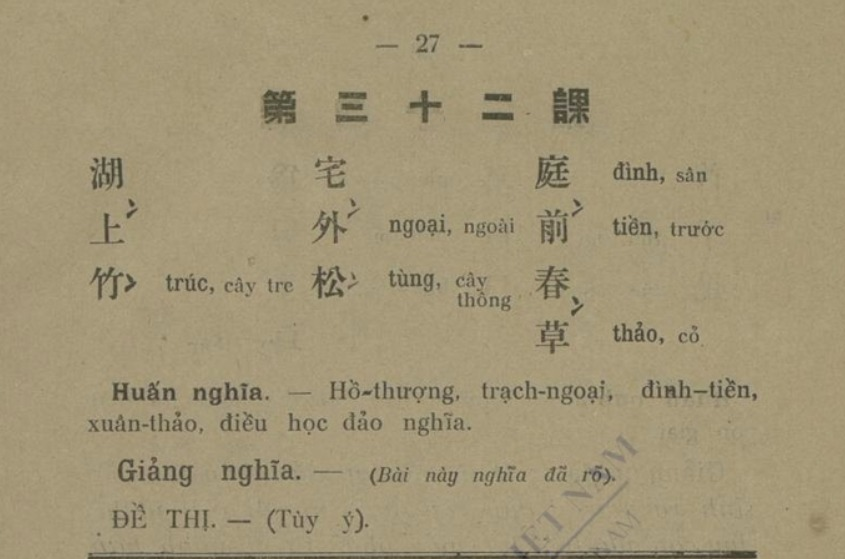
Vietnamese reversal mark ン in the book, Khai tâm hán văn giáo khoa (1924)

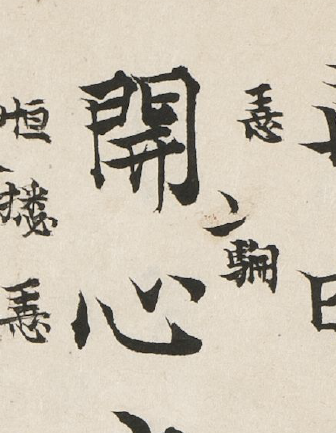
The mark in Phật thuyết thiên địa bát dương kinh 佛説天地八陽經 reversing 開心 khai tâm which becomes 𢚸𲉈 lòng mở.

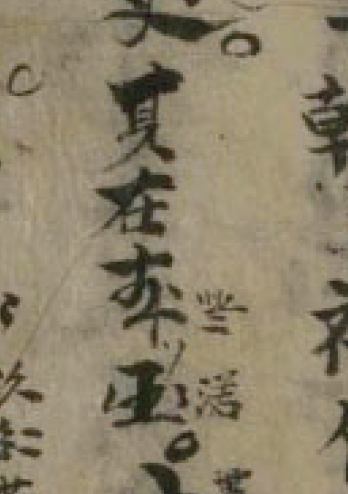
The mark in a manuscript of Sơ học vấn tân 初學問津 reversing the order of 本ン國 bản quốc which becomes 渃些 nước ta

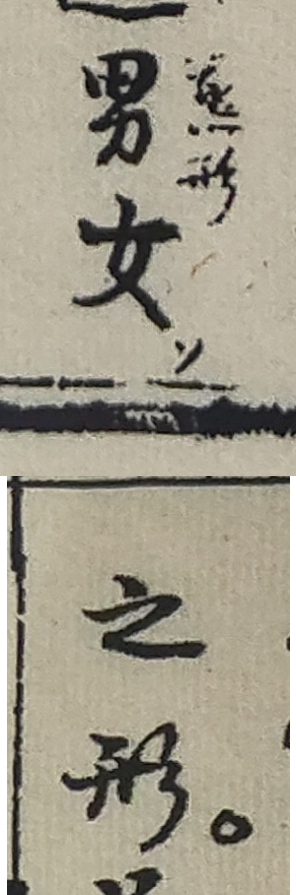
The mark used in Tịnh nghiệp văn diễn nghĩa 净業文演義 in the phrase 男女ン之形 nam nữ chi hình which becomes 蒸形𤳆𡛔 chưng hình trai gái. The gloss 蒸形 chưng hình can be seen.

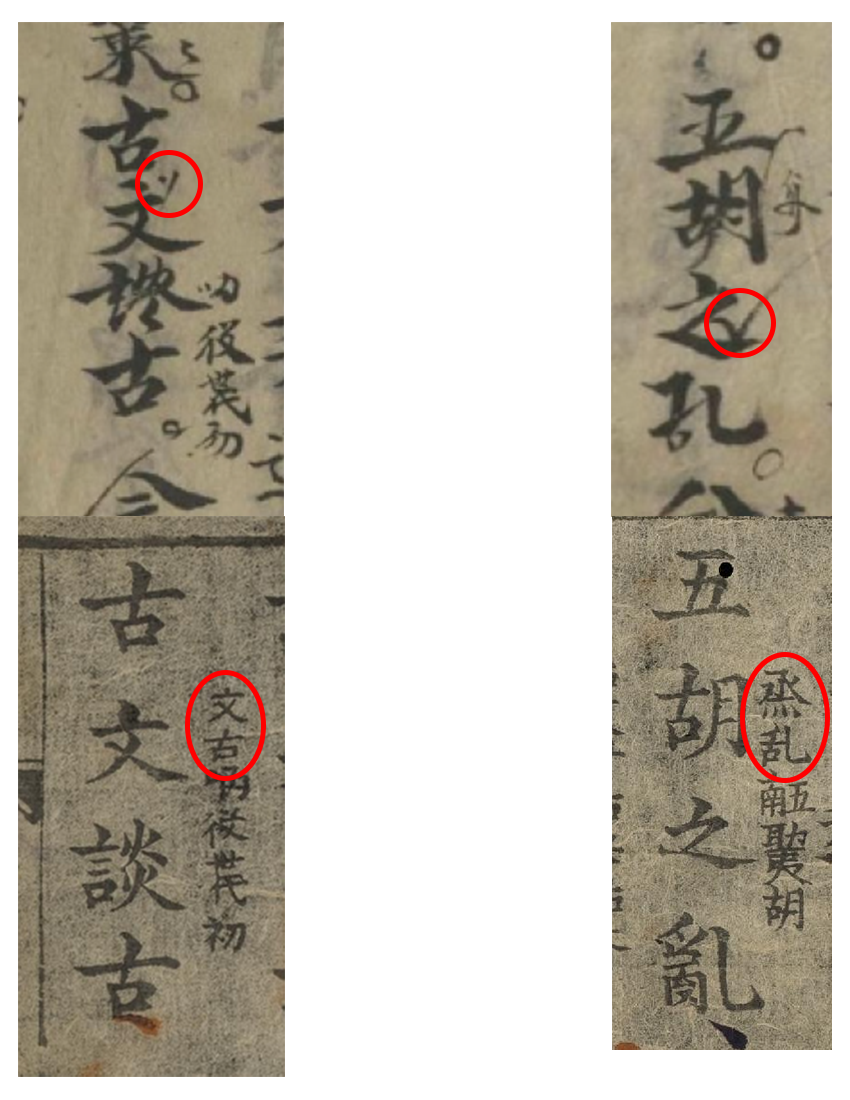
Comparison of word order in Sơ học vấn tân 初學問津. The manuscript uses reversal marks including a check-mark that is similar to Japanese reten レ点. While the printed edition does not use the marks, but already switched the word order.

== Notable giải âm texts ==
- Chỉ nam ngọc âm giải nghĩa (指南玉音解義) - earliest existing Literary Chinese - Vietnamese dictionary, has two prefaces both in Vietnamese and CC.
- Tứ thư ước giải (四書約解) - a translation of the Four Books, complied by Lê Quý Đôn (黎貴惇).
- Thi kinh giải âm (詩經解音) - a translation of the Classic of Poetry.
- Ngũ kinh tiết yếu diễn nghĩa (五經節要演義) - a translation of the Five Classics totalling 12 volumes, translated by Bùi Huy Bích (裴輝璧).
- Thi kinh đại toàn tiết yếu diễn nghĩa (詩經大全節要演義) - a translation of the Classic of Poetry.
- Thư kinh đại toàn tiết yếu diễn nghĩa (書經大全節要演義) - various translations of the chapters from the Classic of Documents.
- Lễ kí đại toàn tiết yếu diễn nghĩa (禮記大全節要演義) - a translation of the Classic of Rites consisting of 4 volumes.
- Dịch kinh đại toàn tiết yếu diễn nghĩa (易經大全節要演義) - a translation of the I Ching, translated by Phạm Quý Thích (范貴適).
- Xuân Thu đại toàn tiết yếu diễn nghĩa (春秋大全節要演義) - a translation of the Spring and Autumn Annals consisting of 6 volumes.
- Âm chất giải âm (隂騭解音) - a translation of Wenchang Wang's work, 陰騭文 Yīnzhìwén.
- Đại Việt sử ký tiệp lục tổng tự (大越史記捷綠總序) - a summary of the history of Đại Việt with Vietnamese commentary.
- Tam giáo nhất nguyên giải âm (三教一原解音) - a translation of Tam giáo nhất nguyên (三教一原) written by Trịnh Tuệ (鄭穗).
- Tử vi đẩu số giải âm 紫微斗數解音 - a translation of the Ziwei doushu methods used for divination.

== Gallery ==
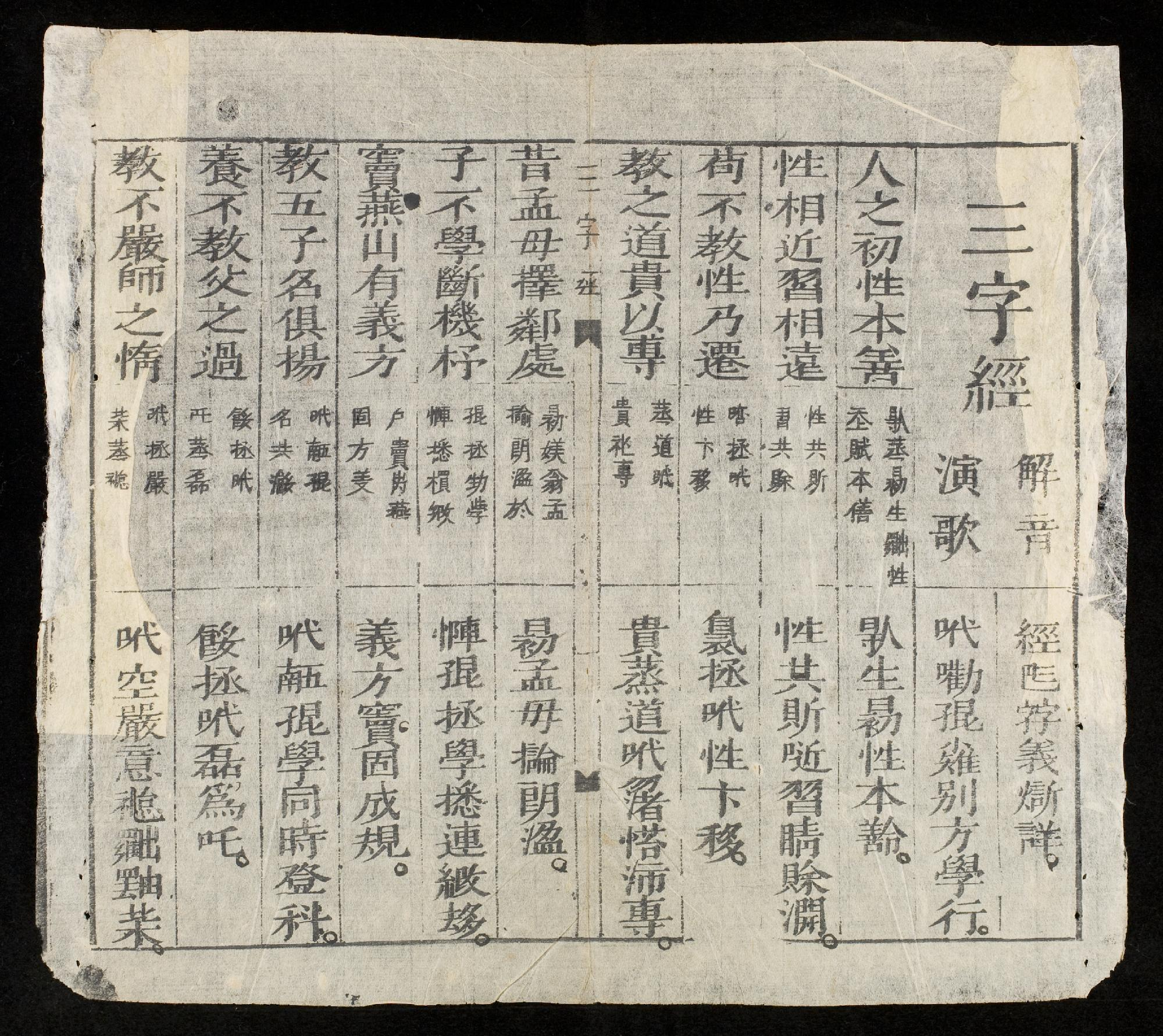
A page from Tam tự kinh giải âm diễn ca 三字經解音演歌, shows the original text of Three Character Classic (三字經) alongside the Vietnamese giải âm translation (top) and Vietnamese poetic translation (diễn ca 演歌; bottom) in lục bát verse.

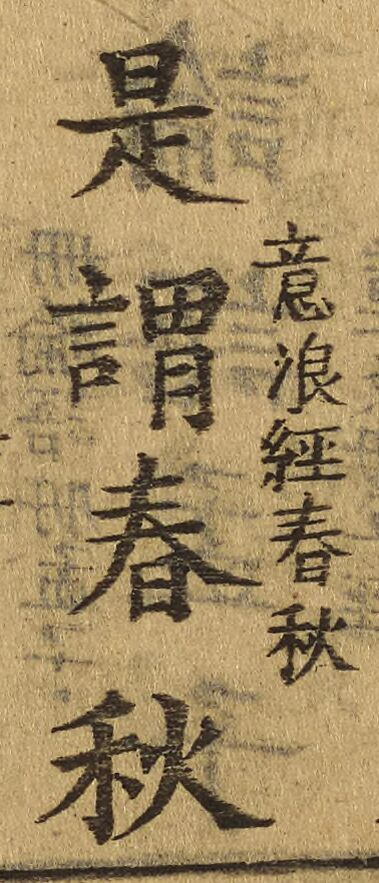
A excerpt from Sơ học vấn tân 初學問津, 是謂春秋 (Thị vị Xuân thu; That is called Spring and Autumn Annals): 意浪經春秋 (Ấy rằng Kinh Xuân Thu).

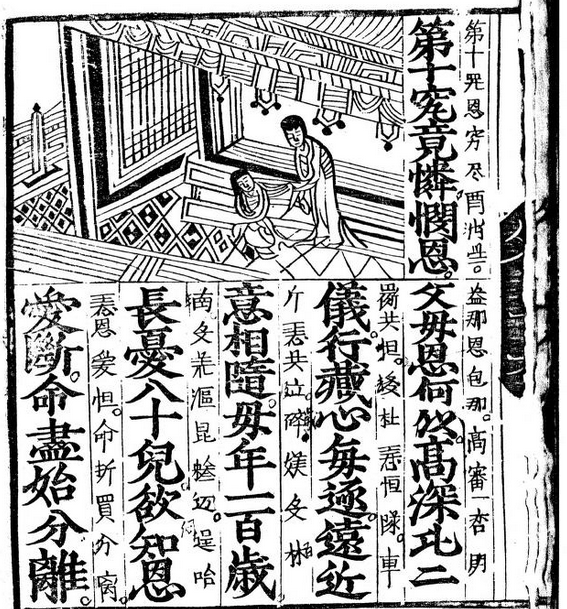
A page from Phật thuyết đại báo phụ mẫu ân trọng kinh 佛說大報父母恩重經 which shows text in Literary Chinese alongside an earlier form of chữ Nôm representing Old Vietnamese pronunciation. Some double phonetic characters (chữ kép) are used to represent the consonant clusters in Old Vietnamese.

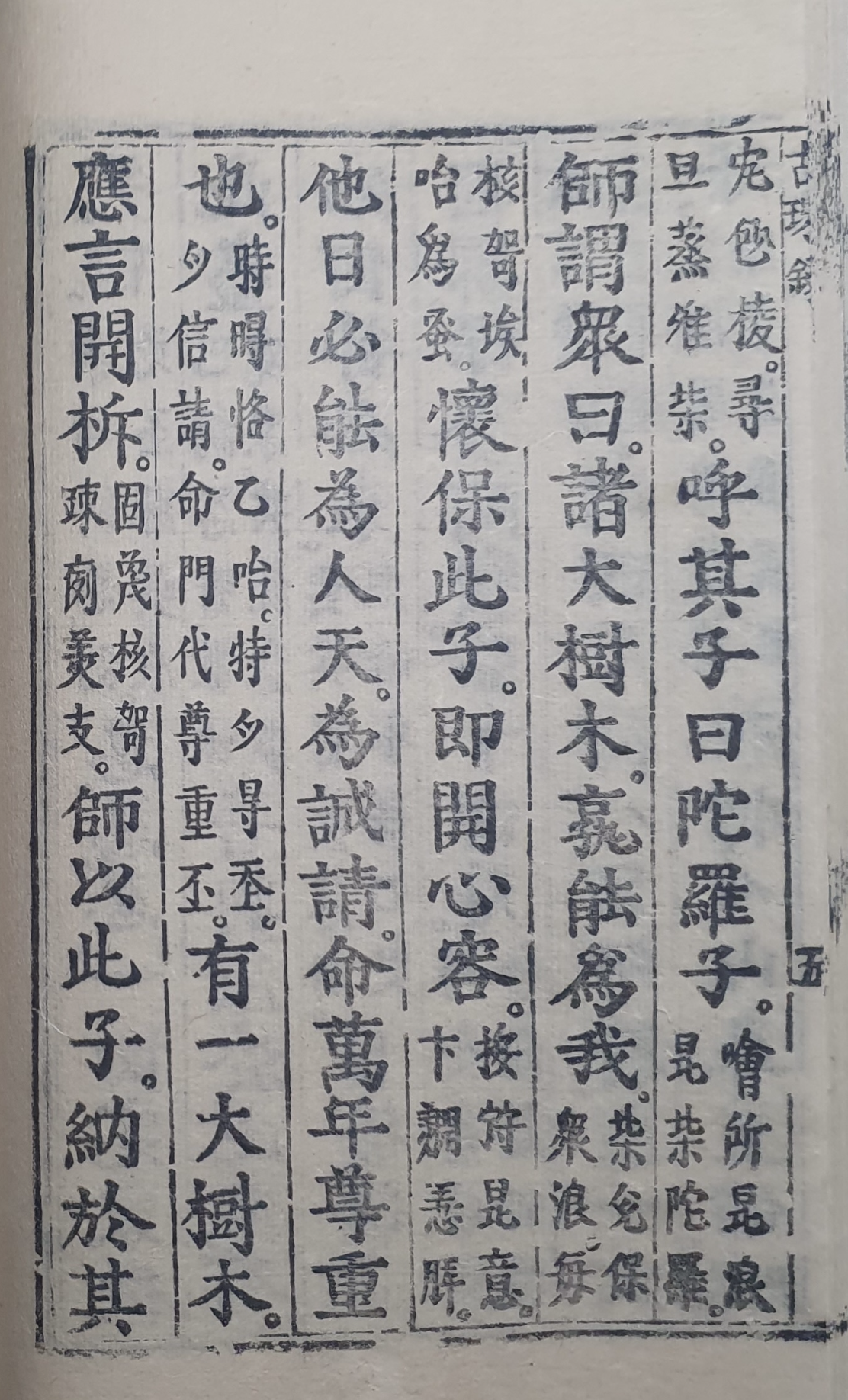
Cổ Châu Pháp Vân Phật bản hạnh ngữ lục 古珠法雲佛本行語錄 featuring the original Classical Chinese text and Vietnamese translation.

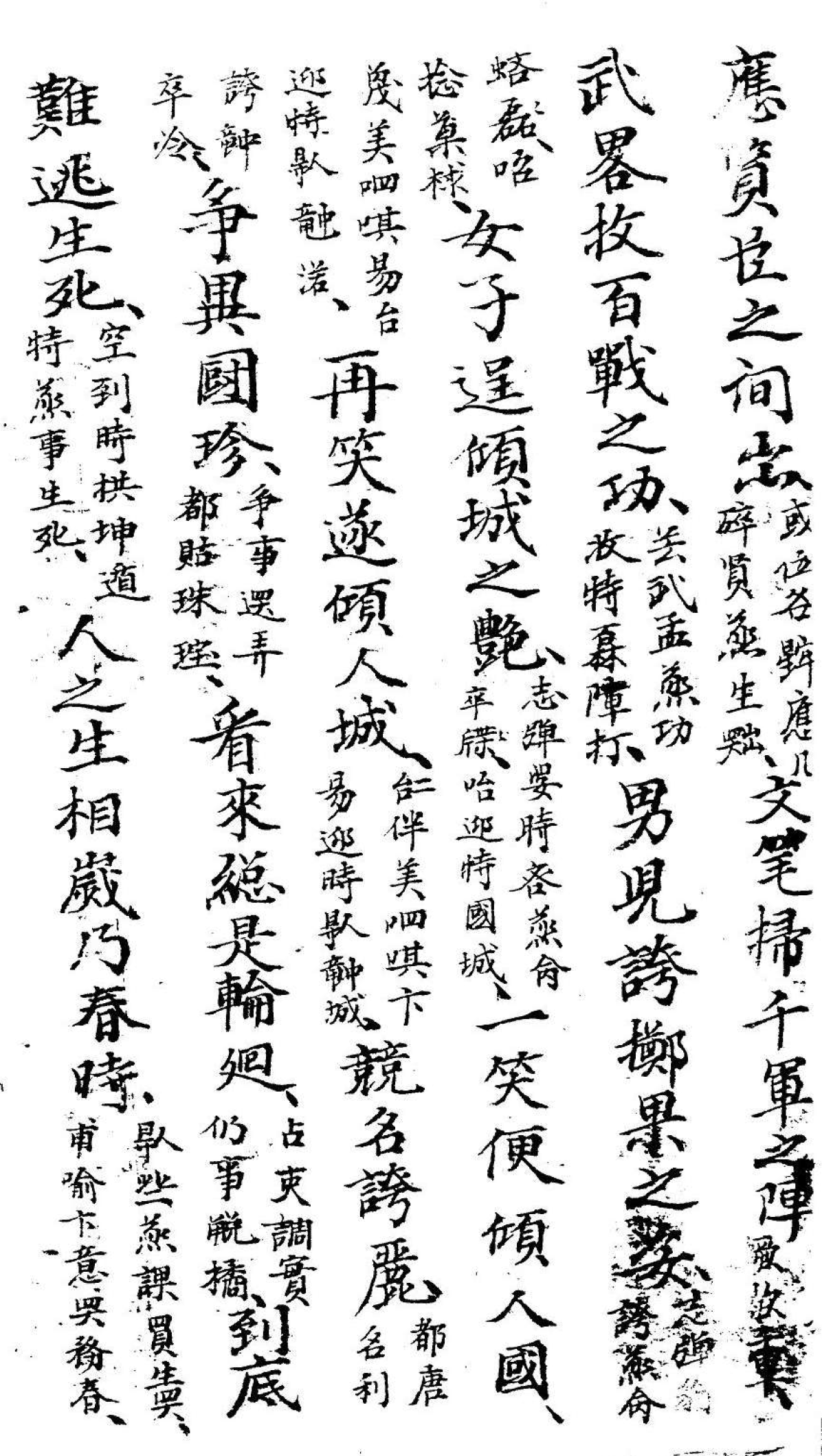
Thái Tông hoàng đế ngự chế Khoá Hư Tập 太宗皇帝御製課虚集, a translation of Khóa hư lục 課虚錄, a work by Trần Thái Tông (1218–1277).

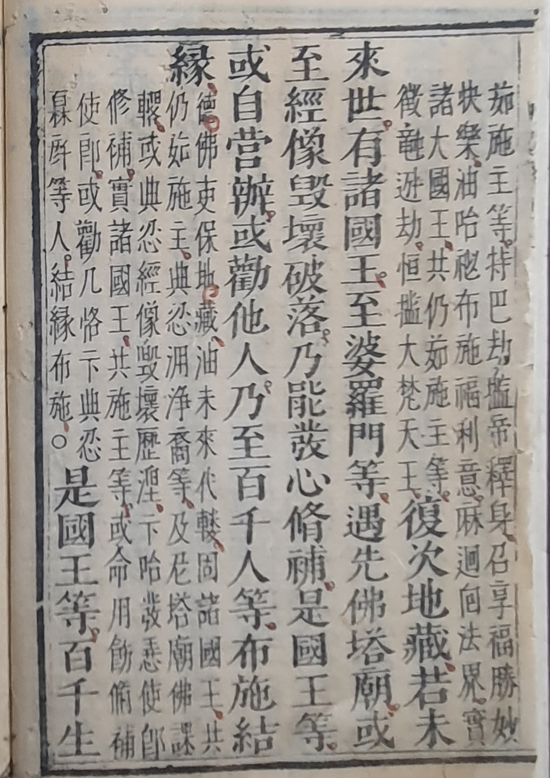
Địa Tạng kinh giải thích Hoa ngôn 地蔵經解釋華言, a Vietnamese translation of the Kṣitigarbha Bodhisattva Pūrvapraṇidhāna Sūtra.

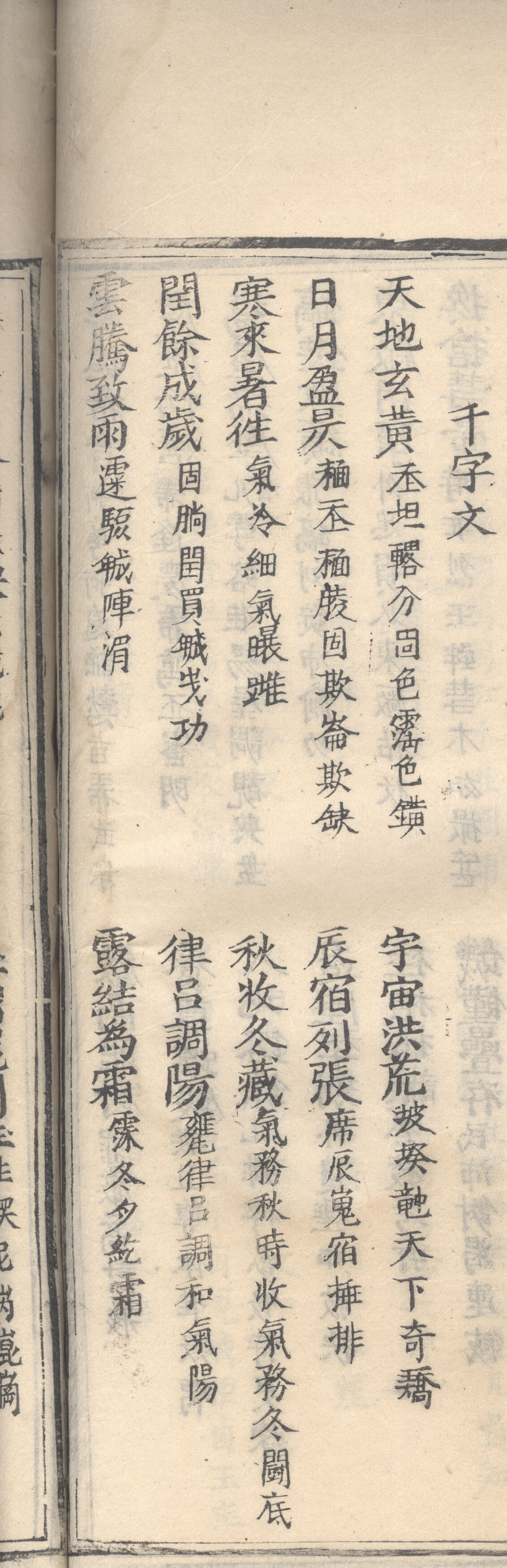
A giải âm translation of the Thousand Character Classic (千字文).

== See also ==
- Chữ Nôm
- Kanbun
- Gugyeol
- Idu
- Tự Đức thánh chế tự học giải nghĩa ca
