= Sutra of Filial Piety =

The Sutra of Filial Piety (or Sutra on the Profundity of Filial Love, Sutra on Parental Benevolence, Chinese: 佛說大報父母恩重經) is an apocryphal sutra composed in China and apparently an exercise in Buddhist apologetics. It is claimed to have been translated by the monk Kumārajīva.

The text attempts to synthesise native Confucian ideals with Buddhist teachings and was probably produced by Chinese Buddhist monks in imitation of the Confucian Classic of Filial Piety. The sutra seeks to refute Confucian criticism that Buddhism's traditionally monastic focus undermines the virtue of filial piety.

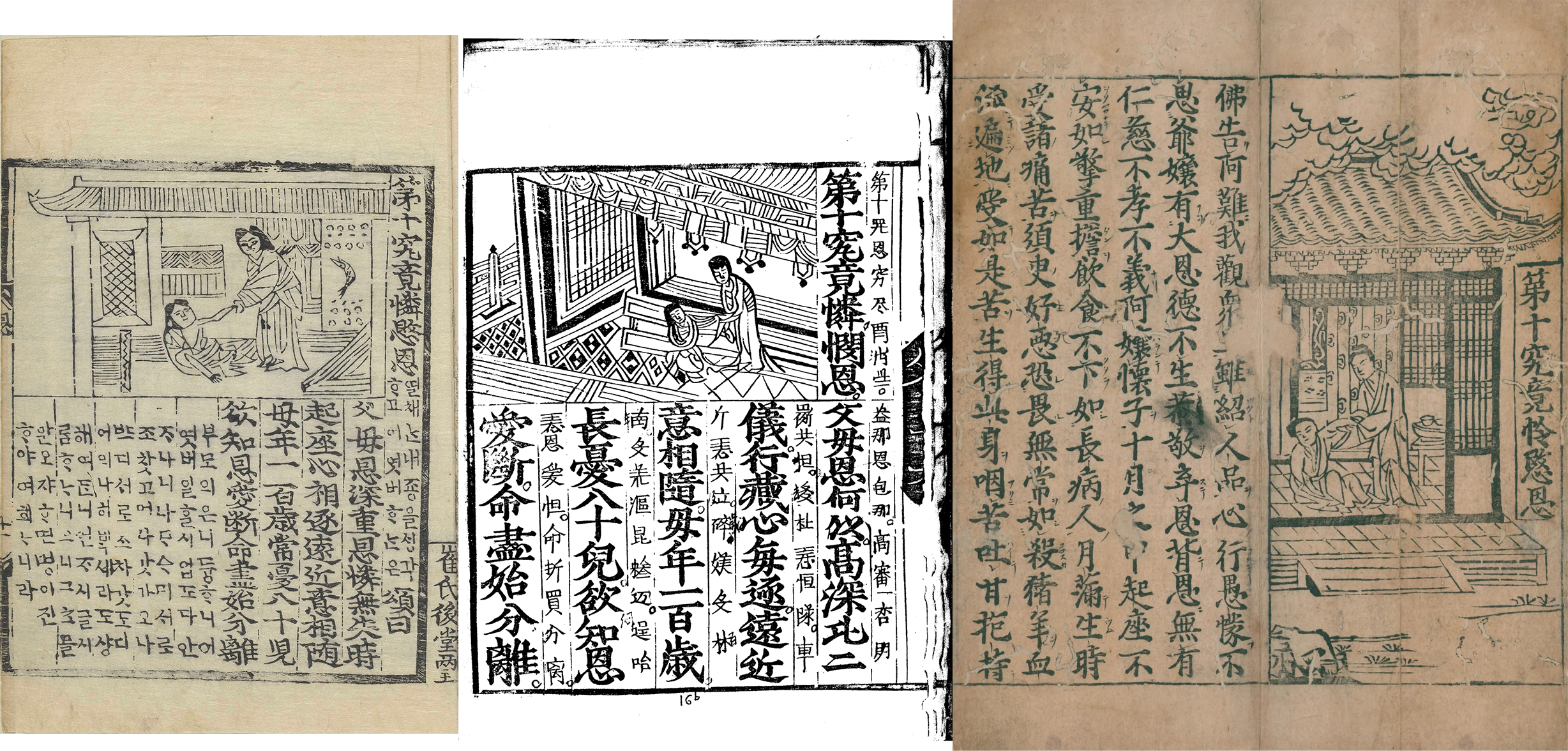
Illustrated editions of the Sutra of Filial Piety (佛說大報父母恩重經) in Korean (left), Vietnamese (center), and Japanese (right). The Korean edition includes Hangul annotations, the Vietnamese edition includes a Giải âm translation, and the Japanese edition includes Kanbun glossing.

The sutra is still highly popular in China and Japan and in the latter is sometimes used as a focus in Naikan-type introspection practices.

== See also ==
- Filial piety in Buddhism
