= Tự Đức thánh chế tự học giải nghĩa ca =

Vietnamese book

- 嗣德聖製字學解義歌
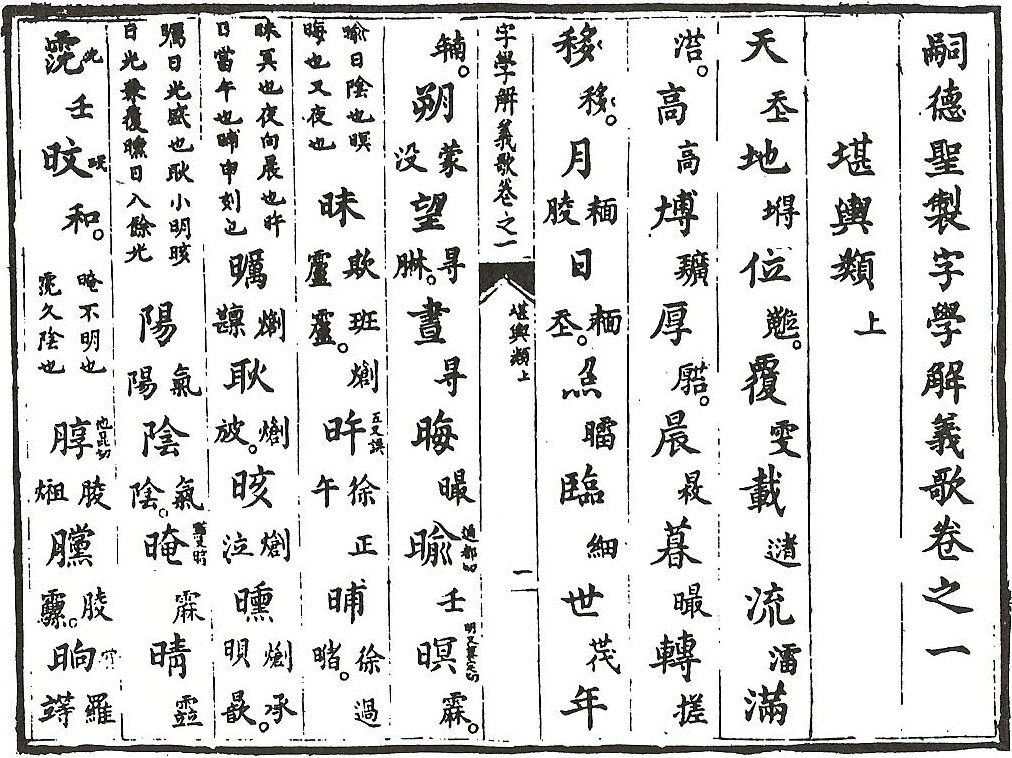
- The first page of 嗣德聖製字學解義歌 - Tự Đức thánh chế tự học giải nghĩa ca.
- Compiled by: Tự Đức 嗣德
- Language: Vietnamese (Written in chữ Nôm) and Literary Chinese
- First printed edition: 19th century
- Verse form: Lục bát 六八

Tự Đức thánh chế tự học giải nghĩa ca (chữ Hán: 嗣德聖製字學解義歌; 'Emperor Tự Đức's sagely creation about character learning and explanation song') is a Vietnamese book that teaches Chinese characters (chữ Hán) through chữ Nôm. It was complied by the emperor of the Nguyễn dynasty, Tự Đức (1848–1883), around the 19th century. The book itself contains 13 volumes which are organized into 7 major categories. It is written in the Vietnamese lục bát 六八 verse form. It is considered to be an important dictionary for chữ Nôm researchers as it is a fairly complete Hán-Nôm dictionary with no ambiguous characters. (Note: An example would be the character annotating 地, instead of 坦 (a commonly used character, but is also found in Literary Chinese texts; thản), the character 𡐙 is used instead.)

== Background ==
The book and its 13 volumes contains 4,572 verses written in lục bát 六八 verse form. Within all of these verses, contains 32,004 characters with 9,028 of them being Chinese characters. It can be considered as a bilingual Literary Chinese - Vietnamese character dictionary. The book shows Chinese characters being glossed with chữ Nôm in smaller print. The annotations can range from one character to multiple characters, for example on the fifth line, 月 and 日 are annotated with 𩈘𦝄 and 𩈘𡗶 respectively.

- Kham dư loại 堪輿類: (Volumes 1–2; 上-下) (Note: The characters 上-下 refers to the first and second parts of the volume. 中 refers to the middle part of the volume. Such as in the title of first volume, 卷之一 堪輿類 上 (in smaller print).) contains characters about both astronomy and geography.
- Nhân sự loại 人事類: (Volumes 3–5; 上-中-下) contains characters about human relationships and society.
- Chính hóa loại 政化類: (Volumes 6–7; 上-下) contains characters about education.
- Khí dụng loại 器用類: (Volumes 8–9; 上-下) contains characters about object of everyday use.
- Thảo mộc loại 草木類: (Volumes 10–11; 上-下) contains characters about plants and trees.
- Cầm thú loại 禽獸類: (Volume 12) contains characters about wild animals.
- Trùng ngư loại 虫魚類: (Volume 13) contains characters about insects, shrimp, and fishes.

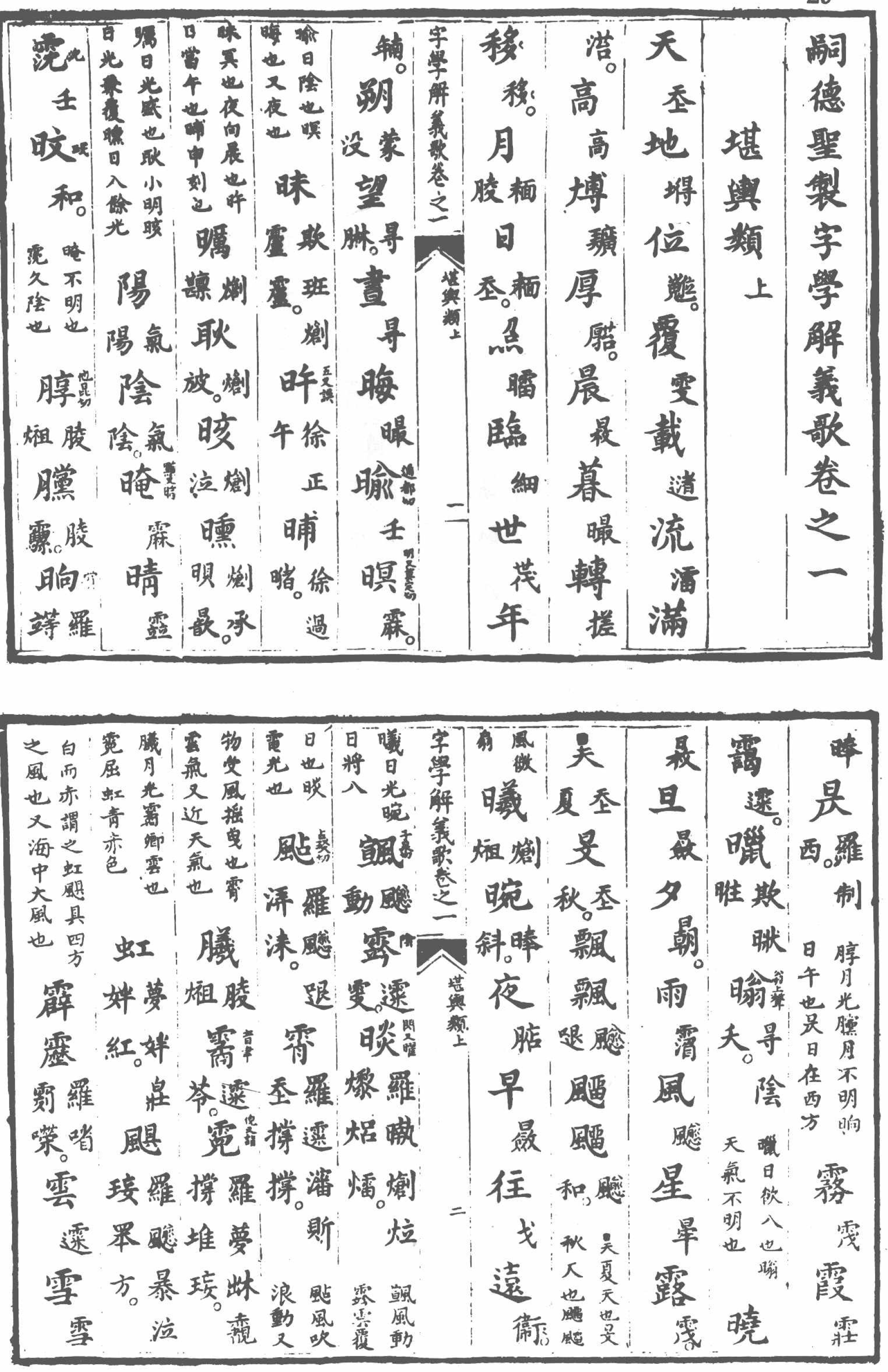
The first and second pages of 嗣德聖製字學解義歌 - Tự Đức thánh chế tự học giải nghĩa ca.

According to statistics by Nguyễn Thị Lan, Tự Đức thánh chế tự học giải nghĩa ca holds the largest collection of Chinese characters that are annotated with chữ Nôm. Hà Đăng Việt states that the Nôm in the book mainly uses three methods of creating characters, giả tá 假借 (phonetic loan), hình thanh 形聲 (phonosemantic compounding), and hội ý 會意 (compound ideographs). But most characters fall into the method of hình thanh 形聲 (phonosemantic compounding) as it was seen as the correct way of writing chữ Nôm.

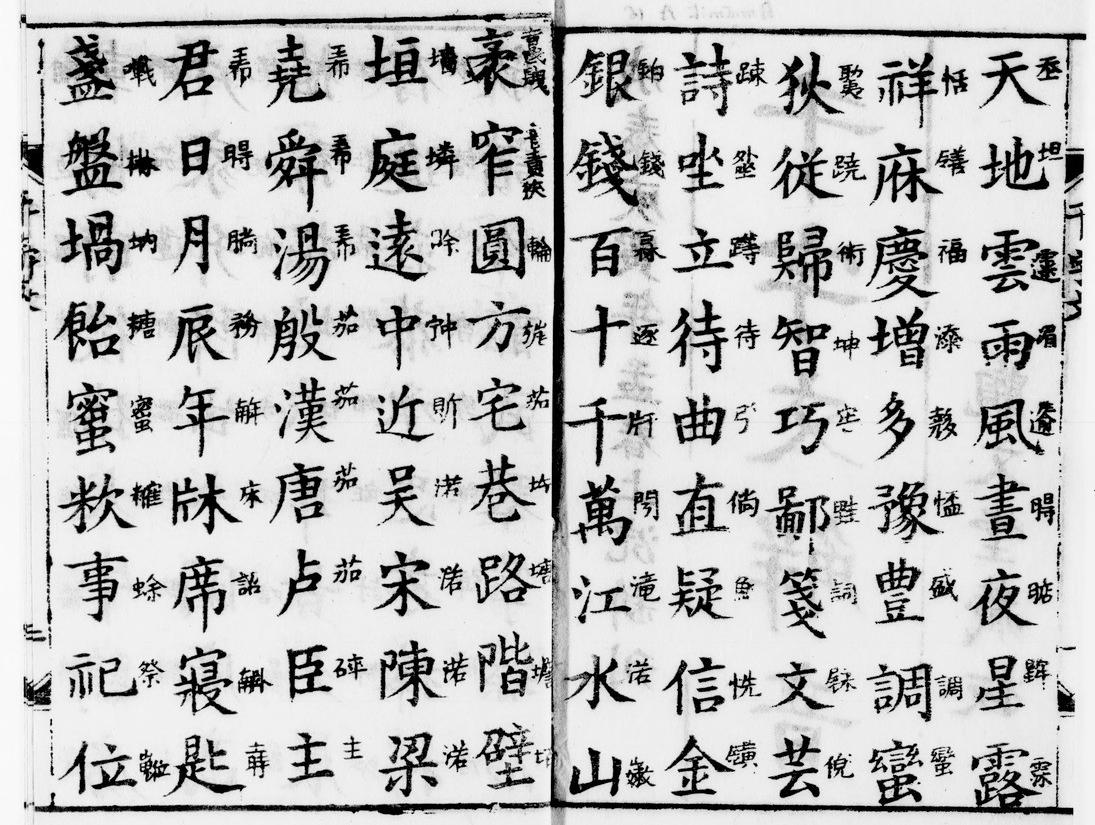
The first and second page of Thiên tự văn giải âm 千字文解音, which compared a thousand Chinese characters to chữ Nôm similar to how it is done in Tự Đức Thánh chế tự học giải nghĩa ca.

Book	Number of Chinese characters
嗣德聖製字學解義歌 Tự Đức thánh chế tự học giải nghĩa ca	9,028
大南國語 Đại Nam quốc ngữ	4779
南方名物備考 Nam phương danh vật bị khảo	4461
指南玉音解義 Chỉ nam ngọc âm giải nghĩa	3394
三千字解音 Tam thiên tự giải âm	2988
日用常談 Nhật dụng thường đàm	2560
難字解音 Nan tự giải âm	1066
千字文解音 Thiên tự văn giải âm	1000

The book itself has been transliterated into the Vietnamese alphabet by Trần Kinh Hòa and was republished by Chinese University of Hong Kong (香港中文大學) in 1971.

== Text ==
The first few lines of the book
Chinese characters and chữ Nôm	Vietnamese alphabet	English translation
天𡗶地𡐙位𡾵	Thiên trời địa đất vị **ngôi**	"Thiên" heaven, "Địa" earth, "Vị" seat
覆𩂏載𬩅流㵢滿𣹓	Phú che tái chở lưu **trôi** mãn **đầy**	"Phú" to cover, "tái" to deliver, "lưu" to flow, "mãn" to overflow
高高博𢌌厚𠫆	Cao cao bác rộng hậu **dầy**	"Cao" tall, "bác" wide, "hậu" thick
晨𣈕暮𣋁轉搓移移 (Note: Both of the characters (移) are marked with the nháy diacritic 𖿱. This means that dời is a Non-Sino-Vietnamese reading of 移 di.)	Thần mai mộ tối chuyển **xây** di **dời**	"Thần" dawn, "mộ" dusk, "chuyển" to revolve, "di" to move
月𩈘𦝄日𩈘𡗶	Nguyệt mặt trăng nhật mặt **trời**	"Nguyệt" the moon, "nhật" the sun
照𥋸臨細世𠁀年𢆥 (Note: The character is ⿱召灬 for 照, but is not currently encoded into Unicode. It is used instead of 照 because of a naming taboo since a lot of characters are missing their 日 radical such as in 照 and 𣈜.)	Chiếu soi lâm tới thế **đời** niên **năm**	"Chiếu" to shine, "lâm" to arrive, "thế" generation, "niên" year

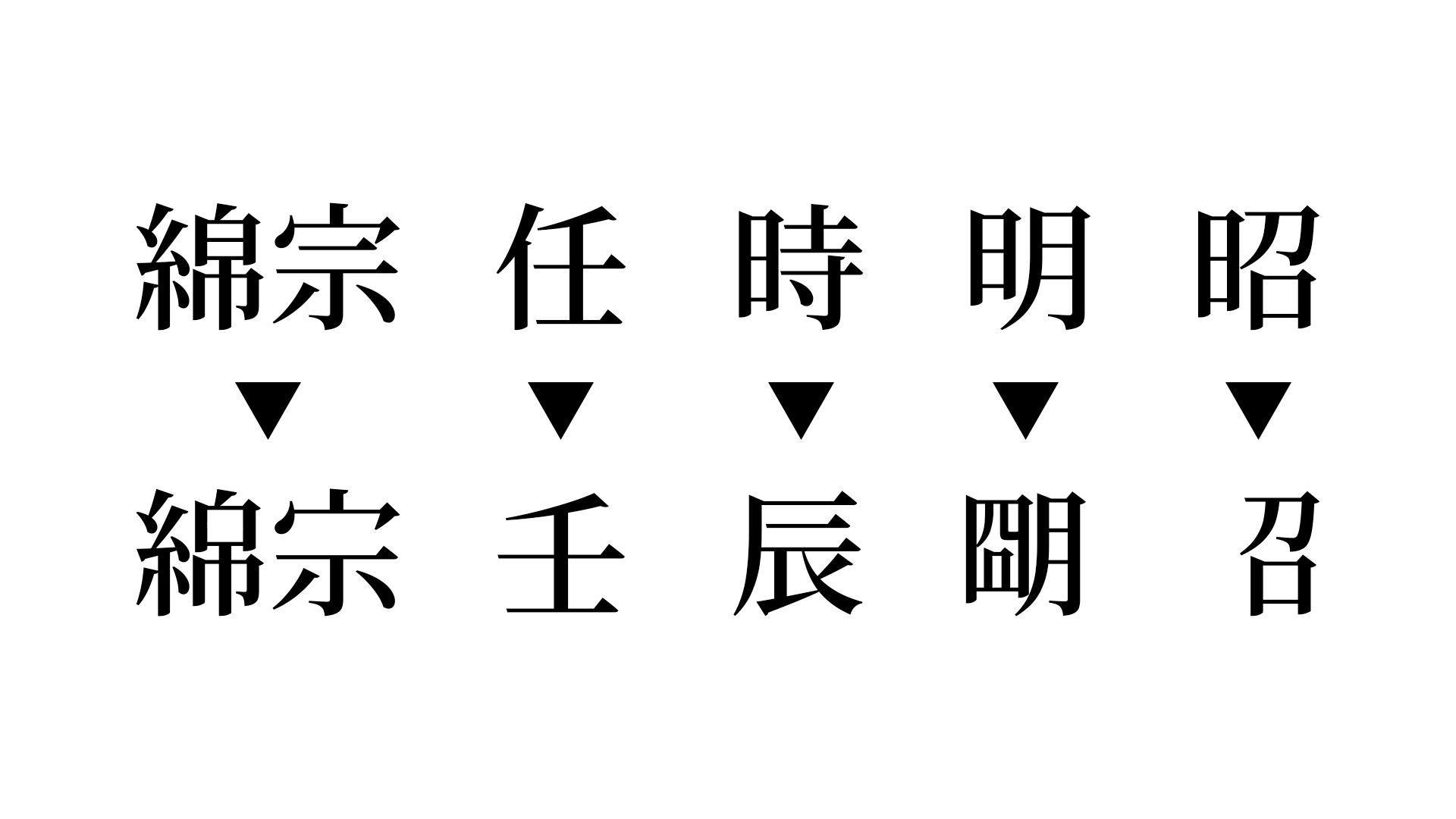
Naming taboo during the Nguyễn dynasty.

- Words in bold are words that rhyme. The book is written in lục bát 六八 verse form as can be seen with these lines (six and eight syllable alternating verses). Words are rhymed every sixth and eighth syllable.

== See also ==
- Tam thiên tự
- Chữ Nôm
- Chữ Hán
- Tự Đức thánh chế luận ngữ thích nghĩa ca
