= Tam thiên tự =

Vietnamese book depicting about 3000 Chinese characters glossed with chữ Nôm

- Tự học toản yếu (字學纂要); Tam thiên tự giải âm (三千字解音); Tam thiên tự giải dịch quốc ngữ (三千字解譯國語); Tam thiên tự toản yếu (三千字纂要)
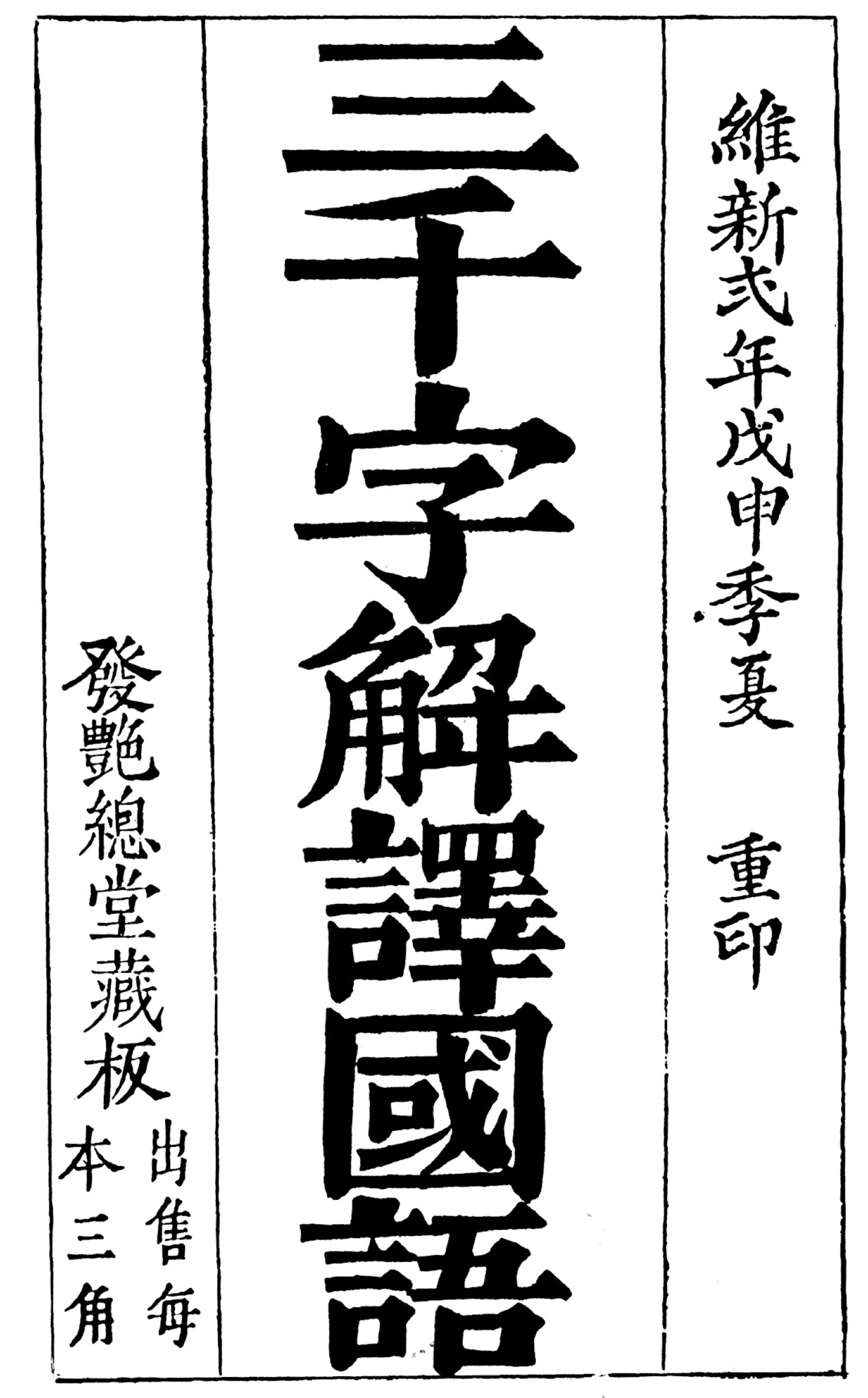
- Title page of the 1908 edition, Tam thiên tự giải dịch quốc ngữ (三千字解譯國語). Shows Chinese characters and Vietnamese (written in the Vietnamese alphabet and chữ Nôm)
- Compiled by: Ngô Thì Nhậm (吳時任)
- Language: Vietnamese (Written in chữ Nôm) and Literary Chinese
- First printed edition: 19th century
- Verse form: Four word verse (tứ tự; 四字)

Tam thiên tự (chữ Hán: 三千字; literally 'three thousand characters') is a Vietnamese text that was used in the past to teach young children Chinese characters (chữ Hán) and chữ Nôm. It was written around the 19th century. The original title of the text was originally Tự học toản yếu (chữ Hán: 字學纂要; literally 'Compilation of essentials for learning characters') The book was believed to be complied by Ngô Thì Nhậm (chữ Hán: 吳時任; Ngô Thời Nhiệm); courtesy name, Hy Doãn (chữ Hán: 希尹).

== Background ==
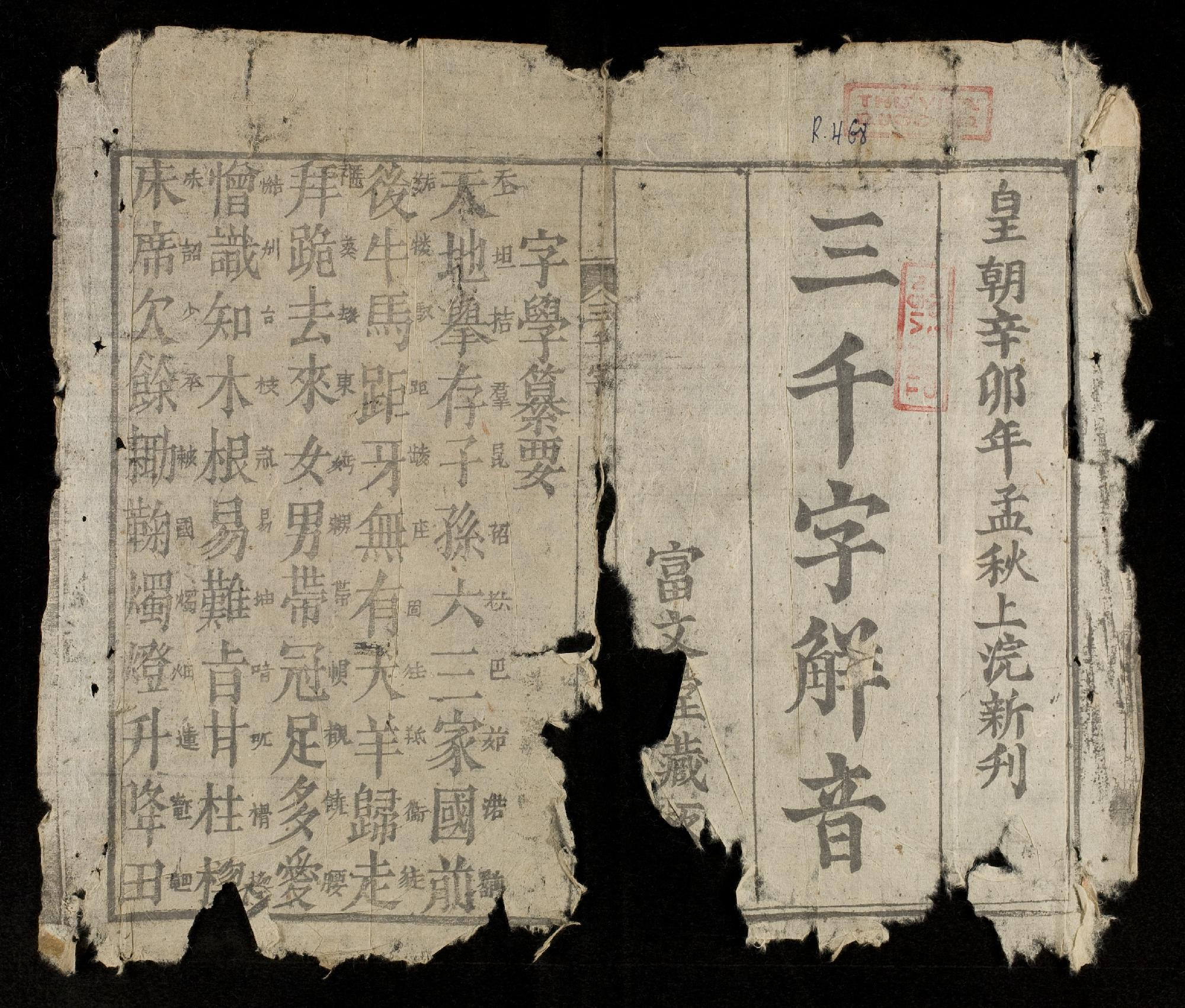
The first and second pages of Tam thiên tự giải âm, Chinese characters (big) can be seen glossed with chữ Nôm (small).

The text contains 3000 characters with no specific order with the characters being organized into four character verses (tứ tự; 四字). These verses are different from other texts that were also used during that time. Books like Nhất thiên tự (chữ Hán: 一千字), Ngũ thiên tự (chữ Hán: 五千字), and Tự Đức Thánh chế Tự học Giải nghĩa ca (chữ Hán: 嗣德聖製字學解義歌) were all composed in lục bát verse unlike Tam thiên tự's four character lines. Each sentence are rhymed every two syllables. The book was organized this way to make it easier for beginner learners to remember the characters. The whole text is essentially a very long rhyme. The Chinese characters are glossed with chữ Nôm in smaller print (consisting of one or two characters).

The text includes characters that cover topics such as body parts (bộ phận thân thể), family relationships (quan hệ gia đình), traditional beliefs (tín ngưỡng), colours (màu sắc), plants (cây cỏ), metals and gemstones (kim loại và đá quý), animals species (loài vật), birds (chim chóc), insects, snakes and centipedes, tailless animals (côn trùng, rắn rết, động vật không đuôi), fish and species under water (cá và loài dưới nước), grammatical words (từ ngữ pháp), numerals (số đếm), and words with reduplication (từ láy).

Ngô Thì Nhậm wrote in his preface,

"Tôi từ thuở trẻ được học về văn chương. Nay được làm quan trong triều, nếu có ý nghĩa gì còn nghi ngờ thì hỏi các bậc cao cả, bèn cùng bàn bạc hỏi han nhau. Còn có những âm tiết không giống nhau, chữ viết cũng khác, không xét vào đâu cho đích xác được. Gần đây, nhân được dự việc trong tướng phủ, được xem các sách hay, tìm rộng trong các tài liệu chữ nào hiểu được, thu nhặt cất đi, phiên âm giải nghĩa, nghĩa liền với vần, vần lại đối nhau, gồm được ba nghìn chữ, đặt tên gọi là Tự học toản yếu. Sách này làm xong, đưa ván khắc in"
"In my childhood, I had the opportunity to study literature. Now while serving as an official in the imperial court, each time I have some doubt about the meaning of a character, I ask the eminent scholars and we discuss and consult one another regarding the matter. Lately in carrying out my duties in the Prime Minister's office, I have been able to read interesting books, so I looked up the words in the various documents; those which I understood, I collected them and filed them away, then transcribed them and gave explanations, each meaning listed next to the word, with rhyming characters. I have called this total corpus of three thousand characters, Tự học toản yếu, and after completing the book, I had the woodblocks made and the volume printed."

— Ngô Thì Nhậm (吳時任), Kim mã hành dư (金馬行余)

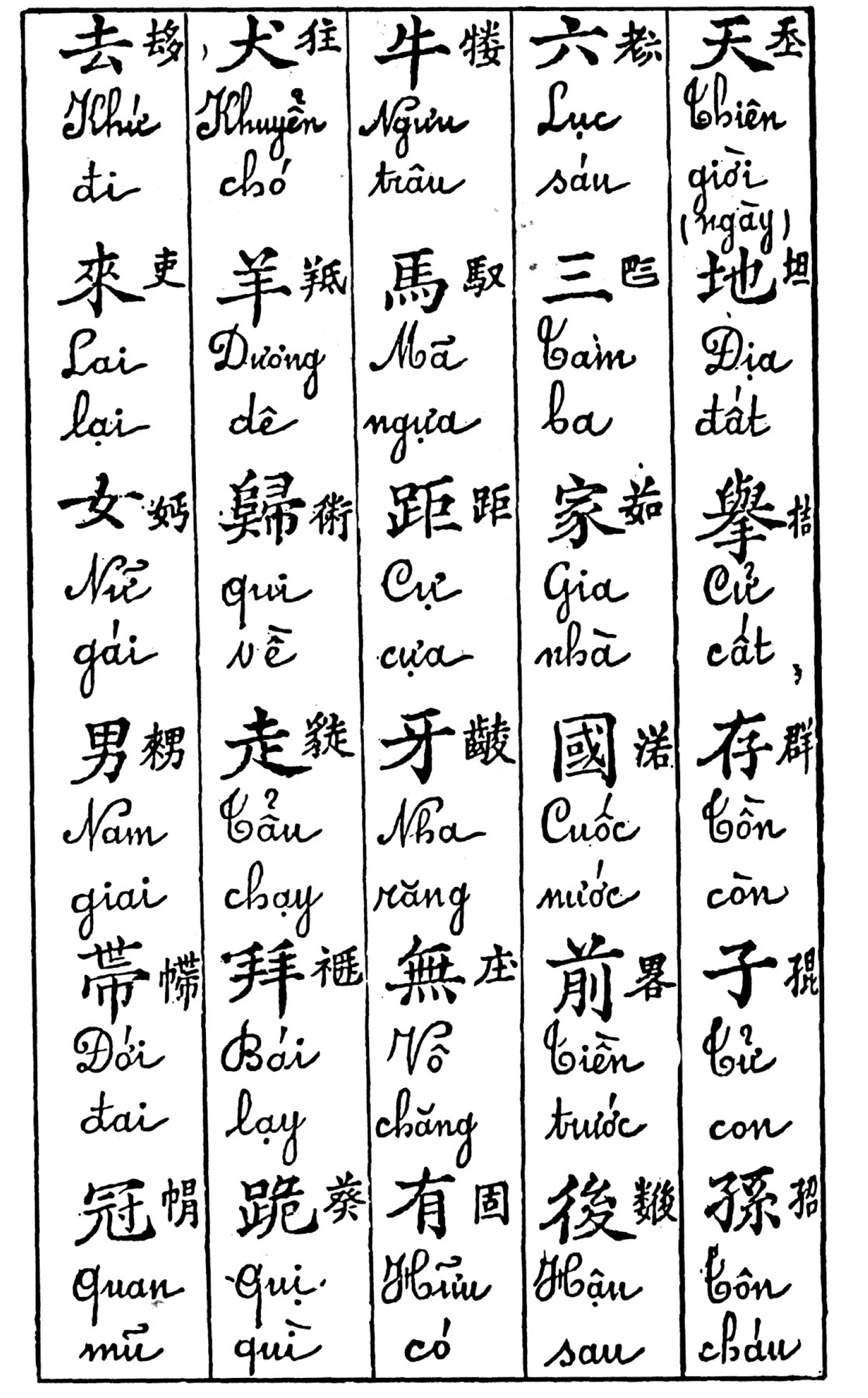
The first page of Tam thiên tự giải dịch quốc ngữ (1908). Depicting Chinese characters glossed with chữ Nôm and the Vietnamese alphabet.

First few characters of Tam thiên tự (Note: Bolded words are the words that rhyme.)
Chinese characters and chữ Nôm	Vietnamese alphabet	English
天𡗶	thiên, trời	sky
地坦	địa, đất	earth
擧拮	cử, cất	to raise
存群	tồn, còn	to remain
子𡥵	tử, con	child
孫𡥙	tôn, cháu	grandchild
六𦒹	lục, sáu	six
三𠀧	tam, ba	three
家茹	gia, nhà	house

=== Archaic words ===
The text also shows several obsolete words that are no longer used in Vietnamese, having a different meaning, or is only used in compound words.

Literary Chinese — Early Modern Vietnamese (Tam thiên tự)	Modern Vietnamese
妓 kỹ — bợm 姂 'prostitute'	đĩ (𡞖), gái mại dâm (𡛔賣淫)
聞 văn — mắng 𠻵 'to hear'	nghe (𦖑)
愼 thận — ghín 謹 'cautious; careful'	cẩn thận (謹慎)
笥 tứ — níp 𥸓 'basket'	rổ (𥯇)
於 ư — chưng 蒸 'at, because'	ở (於), tại vì (在爲)

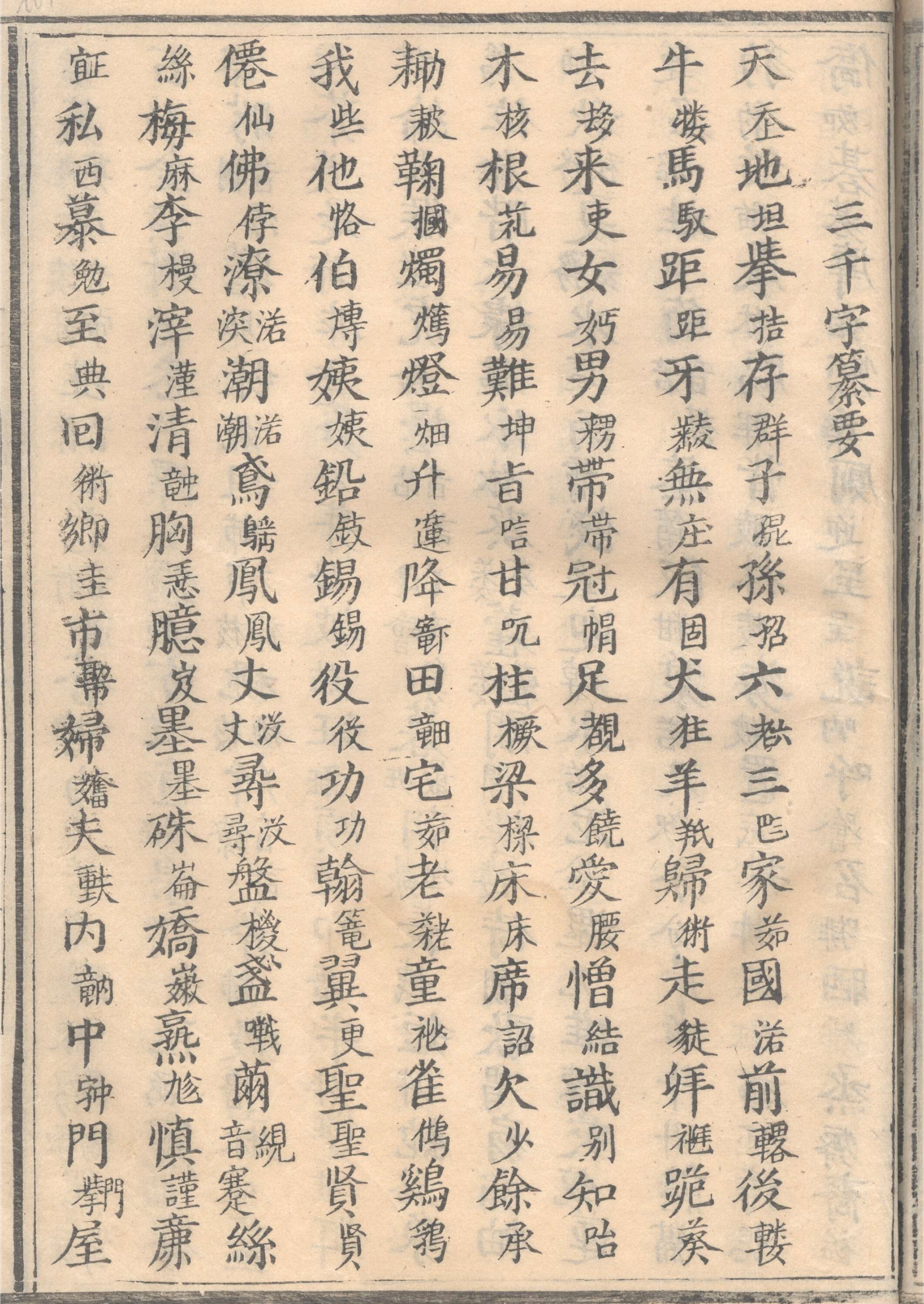
First page of 三千字纂要 Tam thiên tự toản yếu (1845).

== Editions ==
- 三千字解音 Tam thiên tự giải âm (1831)
- 三千字纂要 Tam thiên tự toản yếu (1845)
- 三千字解音 Tam thiên tự giải âm (1886)
- 三千字解譯國語 Tam thiên tự giải dịch quốc ngữ (1908)
- 三千字解譯國語 Tam thiên tự giải dịch quốc ngữ (1915)
- 三千字 Tam thiên tự (1959) by Đoàn Trung Còn

== In media ==
- A scene in the TV show, Lều Chõng, episode 6, depicts a teacher teaching kids how to read characters using Tam thiên tự.

== See also ==
- Three Character Classic - the Chinese equivalent for teaching beginners Chinese characters.
- Thousand Character Classic
- Hundred Family Surnames
- Chữ Nôm
- Chữ Hán
- Tự Đức thánh chế tự học giải nghĩa ca
