= Ngắm Mùa Chay =

Catholic devotion developed in Vietnam

The Ngắm Mùa Chay or Lenten meditation, also known as ngắm dung (Standing meditation) is a Catholic devotion containing many hymns that developed out of 17th century Vietnam. The devotion is primarily a sung reflection and meditation on the Passion of Christ and the sorrows of His Blessed Mother.

== History ==
Alexandre de Rhodes, a Jesuit missionary to Vietnam, attached to the inculturation of the Catholic faith, developed the Lenten meditations based on the Vincentian order, as he recounts in his Histoire du Royaume du Tonkin. His purpose was to "enable the Christians to participate in the liturgy of the Holy Week, in particular the Tenebrae, and to obviate their ignorance of Latin".

The office was inspired from the classical Vietnamese theater (chèo, tuồng). It integrates the Vietnamese poetic form and lament style known as song thất lục bát (雙七六八, literally "double seven, six eight") with an old Christian tradition of popular lament on the sorrows of Christ, which developed alongside the Via Crucis. The discovery of the original manuscripts of Jesuit missionary Giralamo Maiorica using the Nom script, revealed a continuous conservation of the original text, which was quoted verbatim by an 1865 set of the Passion meditations, still in use up to this day.

== Structure ==
The office is written in Vietnamese language and composed of a meditation on the mysteries of the Passion in fifteen ngam (meditations).

The meditations are cantillated, according to the rules of Đọc kinh, from the foot of the sanctuary by one, three, or up to fifteen cantors. The cantor bows his head at the name of Jesus or Mary and kneels at his death. A drum and gong serve as a rhythmical base, while the faithful stand in prayer. A crucifix is placed atop a platform outside the sanctuary and adorned with a fifteen-branch candelabrum, which is systematically gestured at after every meditation, to turn one candle off, as is done in the office of Tenebrae.

After every meditation, the faithful answer by saying one Our Father, seven Hail Marys, and one Glory Be.

== Popularity ==
The Lenten meditation is celebrated in many parts of Vietnam, and around the world in overseas Vietnamese communities, on every Friday of Lent and each evening of the Holy Week.

== See also ==
- Gorzkie żale, a similar tradition alive in the Catholic church in Poland
- Roman Catholicism in Vietnam
