= Hội đồng tứ giáo =

Vietnamese book recording a conference between religions

Hội đồng tứ giáo (會同四教)
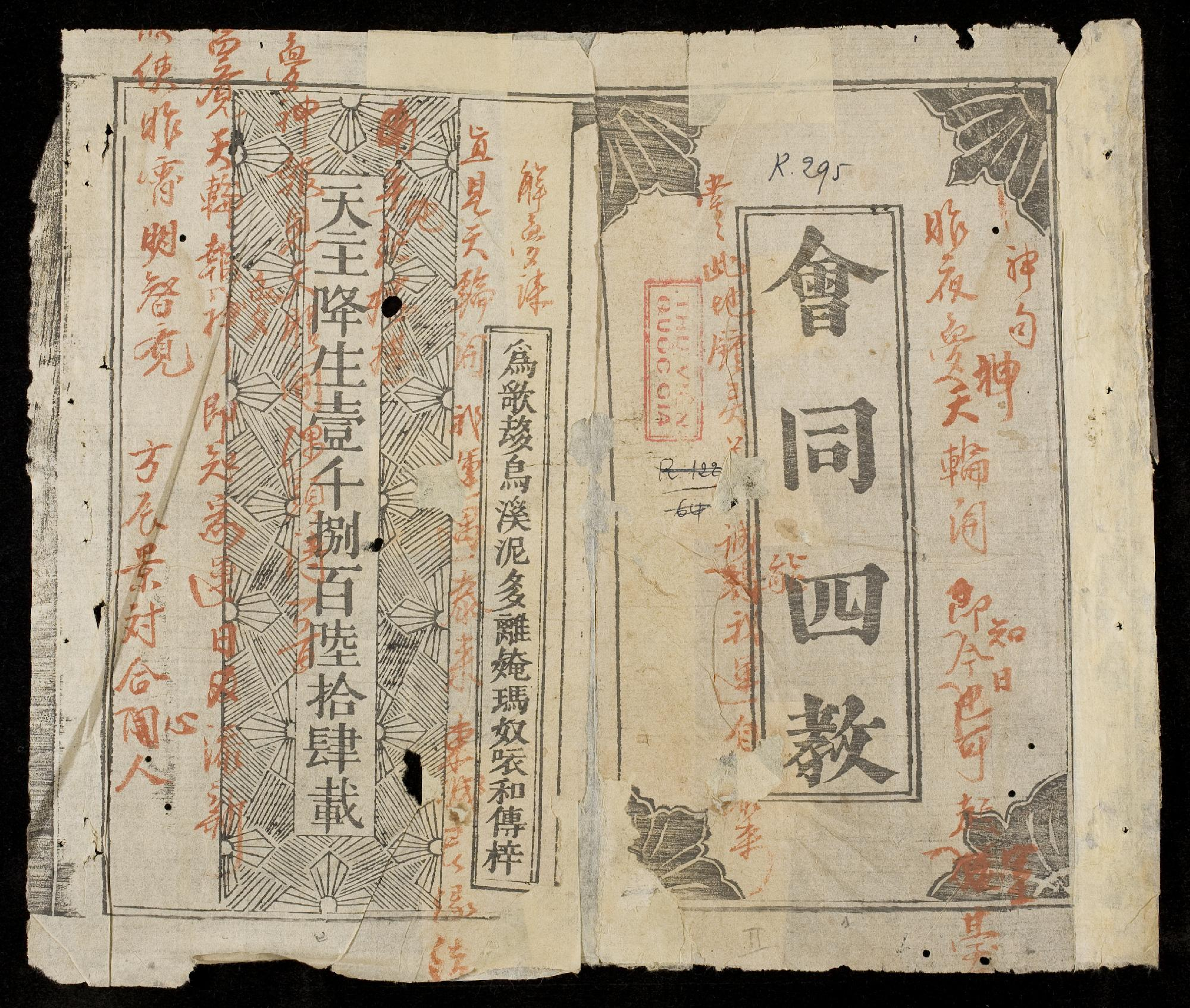
- The cover page of the 1864 edition of Hội đồng tứ giáo danh sư (會同四教名師). The date recorded is 天主降生壹千捌百陸拾肆載: In the year 1864, in the cycle of the Heavenly Lord's birth.
- Also known as: Hội đồng tứ giáo danh sư (會同四教名師)
- Language: Vietnamese (Written in chữ Nôm) and Literary Chinese
- First printed edition: 18th century
- Period covered: Cảnh Hưng (景興)

Hội đồng tứ giáo (chữ Hán: 會同四教; literally 'assembly of the Four Teachings') is a significant Vietnamese Catholic text recording a meeting between two imprisoned Catholics—one foreign and one Vietnamese—who engage in a theological debate with adherents of the three teachings (三教 tam giáo), which respectively refer to Confucianism, Buddhism, and Taoism. The book was written in Vietnamese using the chữ Nôm script as was common with most Vietnamese Catholic texts. The book was later translated into Literary Chinese.

== Background ==
The book is set in 18th-century Tonkin (Đàng Ngoài; 塘外) during the reign of Cảnh Hưng (1740–1786), who was the ruling emperor, while real power was held by Trịnh Sâm (chữ Hán: 鄭森; 1739–1782). Below are the opening sentences from the text.

課代德𤤰黎𱺵𤤰景興。主鄭𱺵靖都王固扒特𠄩柴奇。沒柴方西沒柴本國㩜於几𢄂在庫彭。

Thuở đời Đức Vua Lê là vua Cảnh Hưng. Chúa Trịnh là Tĩnh Đô Vương có bắt được hai thầy cả. Một thầy phương Tây, một thầy bản quốc, giam ở Kẻ Chợ tại Khố Bành.

During the reign of the righteous Emperor Lê (黎), known as Emperor Cảnh Hưng (景興), Lord Trịnh (主鄭), titled Tĩnh Đô Vương (靖都王), captured two great teachers: one from the West and one from the homeland. They were imprisoned in Kẻ Chợ (几𢄂) at Khố Bành (庫彭).

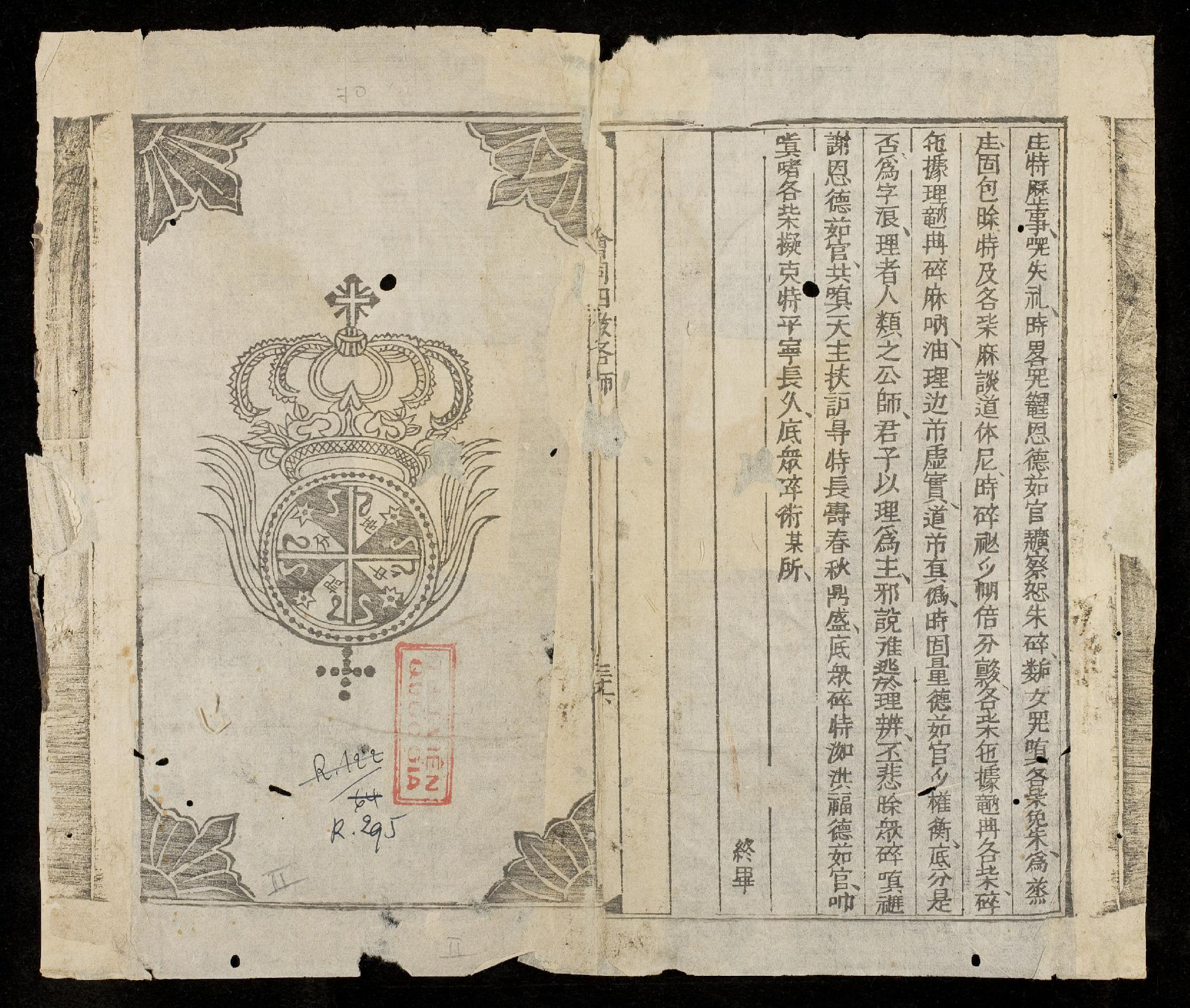
The last page of Hội đồng tứ giáo danh sư (會同四教名師) featuring a Catholic coat of arms with chữ Hán (地，中，記，分)

The two teachers that were captured have been theorised to be the Dominican missionary, Jacinto Castañeda (1743–1773) and a Vietnamese priest, Vicente Phạm Hiếu Liêm (1732–1773). However, there is ongoing controversy surrounding the true identities of the two teachers and the origins of the text, with various theories debating the historical accuracy and authenticity of its accounts.

The conference was hosted by a sixth-rank official referred to in the text as 茹官𦒹 (nhà quan sáu) who was an uncle of Trịnh Sâm. His mother was referred to as 德上㻸 (Đức Thượng Trâm) who was a devote Catholic. The official who wanted to be filial to his mother, the official organized the conference to explore whether the Catholic faith could be considered a heterodox religion. The conference featured four participants: the Western scholar (西士 Tây sĩ), the Confucian (儒士 Nho sĩ), the Buddhist monk (柴和尚 thầy Hoà thượng), and the Taoist master (柴法師 thầy Pháp sư).

Throughout the discussions, the text references various works such as the Great Learning (大學), Xìnglǐ Dàquán (性理大全), Tao Te Ching (道德經), Amitābha Sūtra (南無阿彌陀佛經), etc. The Western scholar (西士 Tây sĩ), one of the Catholic priests who had been captured, draws upon quotes from Confucian, Taoist, and Buddhist texts to bolster his arguments.

箕經易浪。惟皇上帝降。衷于下民。吏周書浪。克相上帝。𫳭綏四方。吏如經詩大雅浪。上帝臨汝。詩执競浪。上帝是皇。吏詩蕩浪。蕩蕩上帝。下民之辟。詩臣工浪。明昭上帝。迄用康年。…意儒家之所謂上帝者。卽聖經之所謂天主也。

Kìa Kinh Dịch rằng: "Duy Hoàng Thượng Đế giáng, trung vu hạ dân." Lại Chu Thư rằng: "Khắc tương Thượng Đế, sủng tuy tứ phương." Lại như Kinh Thi, thi Đại Nhã rằng: "Thượng Đế lâm nhữ"; Thi Chấp Cạnh rằng: "Thượng Đế Thị Hoàng"; Lại thi Đãng rằng: "Đãng đãng Thượng Đế, hạ dân chi bích"; thi Thần Công rằng: "Minh chiêu Thượng Đế, ngật dụng khanh niên"... Ấy Nho gia chi sở vị Thượng Đế giả, tức Thánh Kinh chi sở vị Thiên Chúa dã.

Here the Book of Changes said: "Only 上帝 descends and communicates with the lower people"; Moreover, the Book of Zhou said: "To conquer and serve 上帝 and maintain peace in all four directions"; Also, as the Book of Songs, Dàyǎ states: "上帝 visits you."; The poem of Zhíjìng states: "上帝 is throned"; Again, the poem of Dàng says: "Oh how Majestic, 上帝 is, the ruler of the people below"; the poem of Chén Gōng says: "Bright and magnificent, 上帝, will give us a year of good to enjoy"... That which Confucianism calls 上帝 is the same as 'Heavenly Lord' in the Bible.

— Hội đồng tứ giáo 會同四教, page 7b

The Western scholar's strategy was consistent with Matteo Ricci's approach to proselytizing. As the scholar uses Chinese classics which are well known to explain and justify Catholic ideas.

The book refers to Catholicism as đạo Hoa Lang (道花郎), Hoa Lang (花郎) was an old Vietnamese exonym for Portugal. This exonym was also used in the Complete Annals of Đại Việt (Đại Việt sử ký toàn thư; 大越史記全書):

冬十月，禁天下學花郎道。

Đông thập nguyệt, cấm thiên hạ học Hoa Lang đạo.

Mùa đông, tháng 10, cấm người trong nước học đạo Hoa Lang.

In the winter, during the 10th month, a ban was issued prohibiting people in the country from studying the Hoa Lang religion.

— Đại Việt sử ký tục biên 大越史記續編, volume 19 卷之十九

== Contents ==
The book consists of three chapters, each addressing a distinct topic of discussion that took place during the three-day conference.

- The first day (What is the origin of humans? Where do they come from, and for what purpose do they exist?) - [Ngày thứ nhất], vậy điều Nhất viết, nhân chi bản nguyên, sinh tự hà lai là làm sao? (丕調一曰：人之本原。生自何來𱺵𫜵牢？)

On the question of human origins, the Confucian scholar posited that all things originate from the movement of the Taiji (the Supreme Ultimate), which generates yin and yang. These dual forces subsequently give rise to the Five Elements (wuxing), forming the foundation of existence. In response, the Christian missionaries inquired, "What causes the Taiji to move? Something must initiate the transition from stillness to motion. Therefore, the Taiji cannot be the ultimate root of all things."

The Taoist representative referenced the Tao Te Ching, asserting that "The Tao produces one, one produces two, two produces three, and three produces all things." The Tao itself, they argued, arises from nothingness. This prompted the missionaries to ask, "What is the Tao? How can something originate from nothing? Furthermore, the text refers to "The void of the Great Tao; Hư vô đại đạo" but how can voidness be the root of all things?"

The Buddhist monk cited the Heart Sutra, emphasizing Buddhahood as the fundamental source of life. The Christian representatives challenged this notion, questioning how the Buddha, who lived during the Zhou dynasty, could have played a role in the creation of the world.

The missionaries then expounded on the biblical account of creation, stating that God created the world in six days approximately 6,000 years ago and that all humans are descendants of Adam and Eve. The Confucian scholar countered that such beliefs are rooted in Western tradition, noting that no classical Eastern texts mention the Christian God.

- The second day (What about the present state of humans? How should one live in the world?) - Ngày thứ hai, giải điều Nhị viết, nhân chi hiện tại, tại thế hà như? (𣈜次𠄩。解調二曰：人之現在。在世何如？)

The Confucian scholar outlined Confucian ethics and virtues, emphasizing moral cultivation and societal harmony. A discussion ensued regarding whether the Confucian concept of Shangdi aligns with the Abrahamic God. The Taoist representative elaborated on the principle of wu wei (effortless action), which the Christian missionaries criticized as passive and lacking in moral directive. The Buddhist monk presented Buddhist ethical principles, prompting the Christians to question the consequences of failing to uphold these teachings in the absence of a concept akin to divine punishment.

A Confucian participant raised concerns regarding Christian doctrine, comparing it to superstition by citing the veneration of saints. He also questioned the prohibition of idolatry, asking, "If Jesus is the savior of humanity, did he also save figures like Shennong or Fuxi? Why did God require Jesus to suffer rather than intervening directly?" Further inquiries were made regarding the Nativity and the challenges of reconciling Christianity with ancestral worship, a significant aspect of East Asian spiritual traditions.

The Buddhist representative proposed that both the Buddha and Jesus were sons of the Jade Emperor, but that Jesus was exiled to Earth and had to endure suffering as a form of punishment.

- The third day (What is the ultimate fate of humans? Where do they go after death?) - Ngày thứ ba, giải câu Tam viết, nhân chi cứu cánh, tử vãng hà sở? (𣈜次𠀧。解勾三曰：人之究竟。死往何所？)

The Confucian scholar asserts that when a person dies, their physical form perishes like wood and stone, while the soul dissipates like the wind. This perspective draws an objection from the Western scholar, who argues that if nothing exists after death, then there can be no reward or punishment. The virtuous and the wicked would be treated the same, rendering a lifetime of moral cultivation meaningless.

The Taoist representative presents a contrasting view, claiming that after death, one enters an immortal existence. Taoism also offers elixirs of longevity, believed to grant everlasting life. However, the Western scholar challenges this notion, pointing out that no one has ever been known to achieve true immortality. Even the revered sages of old have passed away.

According to the Buddhist teacher, a person possesses three souls:

1. Thần bì (Skin Spirit), which dissolves upon death.
2. Thần xác (Body Spirit), which remains with the corpse.
3. Thần hồn (Soul Spirit), which determines the fate of the deceased in the afterlife.

If prayers and chants are offered, the Soul Spirit may enter Buddha’s realm and receive blessings; if not, it may fall into the underworld.

The Western scholar questions how prayers and chanting influence one’s fate. The Buddhist master explains that one must invoke Buddha-nature to be guided into the realm of the void (Âm không). Furthermore, even those suffering in the underworld can be liberated through the prayers and vegetarian offerings of the living, especially through the Prison Liberation Ritual (lễ phá ngục). However, those who mock Buddhist teachings will not be granted salvation.

The Western scholar raises two objections. First, this doctrine implies that salvation depends on luck; whether someone prays for the deceased rather than personal merit. Second, the idea of breaking open hell contradicts divine justice, as hell was established by the Supreme Being and cannot simply be dismantled. The Buddhist master counters by questioning why Christianity conducts requiem masses and sprinkles holy water around the deceased while rejecting the Buddhist practice of Prison Liberation.

The Western scholar clarifies that while Christianity has requiem masses, it does not seek to break open hell. Instead, Christianity distinguishes between two types of punishment:

1. Hell (Địa ngục), where souls guilty of grave sins are eternally condemned.
2. Purgatory (Luyện ngục), where souls with minor sins undergo purification.

Christians pray only for the souls in purgatory, asking God to lessen their suffering, but do not seek to overthrow divine judgment.

== Editions ==
- Hội đồng tứ giáo 會同四教 (1864 天主降生壹千捌百陸拾肆載) - Vietnamese edition
- Hội đồng tứ giáo 會同四教 (1924 天主降生一千九百二十四載歳次甲子 and 1911 歳次辛亥伸春月上浣穀日) - Vietnamese and Literary Chinese edition
- Hội đồng tứ giáo 會同四教 (1867 歳次丁卯孟秋月下浣穀日) - Literary Chinese edition

== See also ==
- Catholic Church in Vietnam
- Girolamo Maiorica
- Three teachings
