= Francesco Buzomi =

Italian Jesuit missionary

Francesco Buzomi (1576–1639) was an Italian missionary in Vietnam. He was one of the first Catholic missionaries in Đàng Trong (known to the Europeans as "Cochinchina") and, along with others such as Francisco de Pina, Girolamo Maiorica and Alexandre de Rhodes, belonged to the generation of Jesuit priests in the first half of the 17th century who established the firm foundation of the Catholic Church in Vietnam.

== Biography ==
Buzomi was born in 1576 in Naples then part of the Kingdom of Naples. He was sent to Macau in 1608 and studied theology there for a year. Captain Ferdinand de Costa, after visiting Hội An (known to the Europeans as "Faifo"), told the Jesuit superior in Macau that there was a shortage of priests to minister the Japanese Catholic community and that there were no missionaries for the Vietnamese either. Buzomi then asked for permission to go on a mission in Đàng Trong and was approved.

Buzomi landed in Da Nang on 18 January, 1615. After a time in Hội An and Thanh Chiêm, Buzomi established a mission in Pulocambi in 1618. Commissioned by Nguyễn lord Phúc Lan, Buzomi came back to Macau in 1639; he died there the same year.
