= Vietnamese Catholic Lunar New Year =

Cultural and religious holiday

Vietnamese Catholics observance of Tết or Lunar New Year represents a unique synthesis of Catholic liturgical practice and traditional Vietnamese culture. Rooted in centuries of negotiation between faith and local custom, these celebrations reflect the Church’s adaptation following the reforms of the Second Vatican Council (1962–1965). Historically, Catholics in Vietnam were discouraged from engaging in ancestral rites and folk customs, but the Vatican’s recognition in 1965 of their cultural value allowed such practices to be harmonized with Catholic theology. By the early 1990s, official liturgical texts for the three principal days of Tết were included in the Vietnamese Missal, formally integrating ancestor remembrance and thanksgiving into the Church’s calendar. Today, Vietnamese Catholics mark the New Year through a series of special Masses, family gatherings, acts of charity, and cultural festivities, expressing both religious devotion and national heritage.

== History ==
Prior to the Second Vatican Council, Vietnamese Catholics were restricted from participating in traditional ritual customs. Under challenging conditions, efforts emerged to develop new approaches that would allow integration with Vietnamese culture.

On November 24, 1960, Pope John XXIII formally established the indigenous Catholic leadership of Vietnam. In alignment with the Second Vatican Council, Vietnamese bishops petitioned the Holy See to extend the Plane compertum est guidelines—originally granted to Chinese Catholics—to Vietnam. This request was approved by the Congregation of the Propagation of Faith on June 14, 1965, officially permitting Vietnamese Catholics to venerate ancestors and national heroes. This marked a significant shift, as such practices had been prohibited since the seventeenth century.

In 1974, the Evangelization Committee of the Vietnamese Bishops’ Conference issued a communiqué that expanded on earlier permissions regarding ancestor veneration. It addressed practices such as building ancestral altars, burning incense, and observing death anniversaries. While the document was more assertive than the 1965 guidelines, its impact was limited. Following the Fall of Saigon in April 1975, religious activities were heavily restricted under the newly unified government. Over time, however, political constraints eased, and the practice of ancestor veneration among Vietnamese Catholics gained broader acceptance and theological clarity.

A major milestone came in 1992 with the publication of five official Mass formularies for the first three days of Tết in the Vietnamese Sacramentary. These liturgical texts incorporated ancestor veneration into the Catholic celebration of Lunar New Year and were given precedence over many other feast days in the Roman Catholic calendar.

After the Council, Catholic communities in Vietnam began practicing a combination of rites: ceremonies grounded in Catholic teaching alongside customs rooted in national traditions. This dual practice illustrates the diverse ways Catholics in Vietnam understand and engage with ritual life.

== Customs ==
In Vietnam, the first day of Tết is typically devoted to the nuclear family, the second day for students, and the third day is dedicated towards teachers.

For Vietnamese Catholics, the first day of the Lunar New Year is marked by attending Mass to pray for peace for the nation and the faithful. On the second day, prayers are offered for deceased ancestors, asking for God’s mercy and forgiveness. The third day is dedicated to asking for God’s blessing on work, study, career, and livelihoods throughout the year.

=== The Five Formularies ===
A Catholic Mass formulary refers to the designated prayers and texts used in the celebration of the Eucharist. It typically includes elements such as the Collect, the Prayer over the Offerings, and the Preface. Each formulary provides the prescribed prayers and readings for a specific liturgical occasion, with variations available for different feasts and seasons. Recent additions include special formularies like the “Mass for the Care of Creation.”

1. Thánh Lễ Tất Niên (Mass of the End of the Year): Done on the eve of Tết to pray for thanksgiving and petition for God’s forgiveness.
2. Thánh Lễ Giao Thừa (Mass of the Transition from the Old to the New Year): This is done at midnight to pray for peace during the coming year.
3. Thánh Lễ Tân Niên (Mass of the Lunar New Year): Officially the first day of Tết to continue to pray for peace.
4. Lễ Kính Nhớ Tổ Tiên và Ông Bà Cha Mẹ (Mass for the Remembrance of Ancestors, Grandparents, and Parents): Done on the second day. It is also common to pray for the 117 Vietnamese Martyrs on the second day as well.
5. Lễ Thánh Hoá Công Ăn Việc Làm (Mass for the Sanctification of Human Labor): Done on the third day.

=== Traditions ===
Festivities often include the dragon dance or lion dance, performed by young men in elaborate costumes accompanied by fireworks, drums, and cymbals. This is often displayed in front of church before, after, or during the day's mass. Another important practice is spiritual preparation: confession, charitable acts, and giving gifts to the poor and disabled. These actions are believed to bring blessings and good fortune for families in the coming year. Parishes frequently organize the preparation of sticky rice cakes and distribute gifts to those in need.

On New Year’s Eve, many parishes hold a special Mass. This service allows Catholics to give thanks for the past year, seek guidance for the year ahead, and express repentance for shortcomings toward God and others.

Besides lion or dragon dancing, the following traditions are included:

- Lucky money (lì xì)
- decorating homes with peach blossoms, kumquat trees, and apricot flowers
- Playing gambling games such as Vietnamese bingo/lottery (Lô Tô) or bầu cua cá cọp.
- Visiting relatives, friends, and teachers.
- Wearing traditional clothing (e.g. Áo Dài).
- Eating bánh tét or bánh chưng (rice cakes)

During Tết, Vietnamese Catholics participate in the traditional practice of chúc Tết (formal greetings), offering wishes and small gifts such as fruit or snacks to relatives and friends. In Catholic communities, younger members also extend chúc Tết to their godparent or sponsor, reflecting the importance of spiritual kinship alongside family ties.

=== Traditions typically not practiced by Vietnamese Catholics ===
Catholics omit these, focusing instead on prayers to God.

==== Ancestor worship at home altars or temples ====
- In mainstream Vietnamese Tết, families set up ancestral altars, burn incense, and make offerings of food, spirits, or paper money to invite ancestors back for the new year.
- Catholics instead commemorate ancestors through Masses and prayers for the deceased, avoiding offerings that imply communication with spirits.

==== Fortune-telling and divination (xin xăm) ====
- Many Vietnamese visit pagodas to draw fortune slips or consult astrologers for predictions about the year ahead.
- Catholics replace this with “hái lộc thánh” (picking holy buds) which is taking Bible verses from a tree at church as spiritual guidance, rather than fate-determining slips.

==== Temple visits and Buddhist rituals ====
- Non-Catholic families often go to pagodas to pray for luck, health, and prosperity.
- Catholics instead attend New Year’s Mass and seek blessings through the sacraments, not Buddhist rites.

==== Offerings to household gods or spirits ====
- Traditional Tết includes rituals for the Kitchen God (Ông Táo) and other protective spirits.

== See also ==
- Tết
- Celebrations of the Lunar New Year in other parts of Asia:
  - Chinese New Year (Spring Festival)
  - Korean New Year (Seollal)
  - Japanese New Year (Shōgatsu)
  - Mongolian New Year (Tsagaan Sar)
  - Tibetan New Year (Losar)
- Catholic Church in Vietnam

== External Links to Liturgical Calendar ==
- Diocese of the United States of America
- Vietnamese Liturgical Calendar: 5 formularies
- Korean Liturgical Calendar: 1 formulary
- Diocese of Hong Kong Liturgical Calendarr: 2 formularies
