= Vicente Liem de la Paz =

Vietnamese Dominican friar (1732–1773)

Saint Vicente Liem de la Paz OP
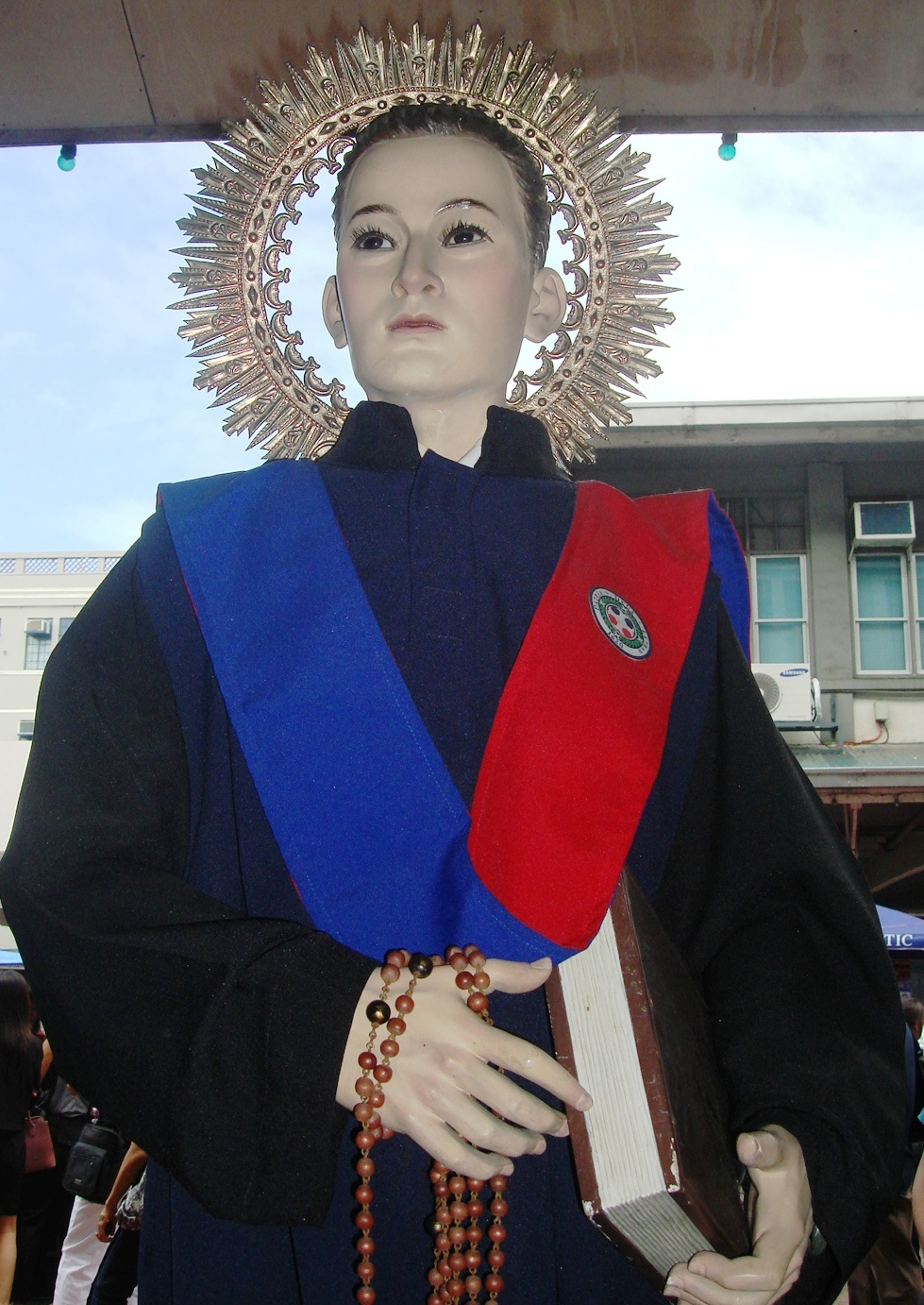
- Statue of Phạm at the Colegio de San Juan de Letran in Manila, Philippines.

Martyr
- Born: 1732; Trà Lũ, Nam Định, Tonkin
- Died: 7 November 1773 (aged 40–41); Đồng Mơ, Đông Kinh, Tonkin
- Venerated in: Catholic Church
- Beatified: 20 May 1906, Vatican City by Pope Pius X
- Canonized: 19 June 1988, Vatican City by Pope John Paul II
- Major shrine: Church of the Holy Rosary, Trung Linh, Vietnam
- Feast: 24 November (General Roman Calendar); 7 November (Roman Martyrology)
- Attributes: book, palm, hood, rosary, academic birreta, dalmatic
- Patronage: Tonkin, Colegio de San Juan de Letran, Students of Letran

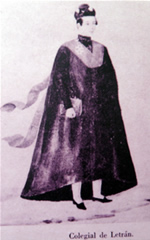
Vicente Liem de la Paz as a Letran student.

Vicente Liêm de la Paz (English: Vicente Liêm of Peace) (Vietnamese: Vinh Sơn Hòa Bình or Vinh Sơn Liêm) (1732 – 7 November 1773) was a Tonkinese (present day northern Vietnamese) Dominican friar venerated as a saint and martyr by the Catholic Church along with other Vietnamese Martyrs in 1988.

In the first round of canonization of the 117 martyrs, he was recognized as the first Vietnamese Christian martyr.

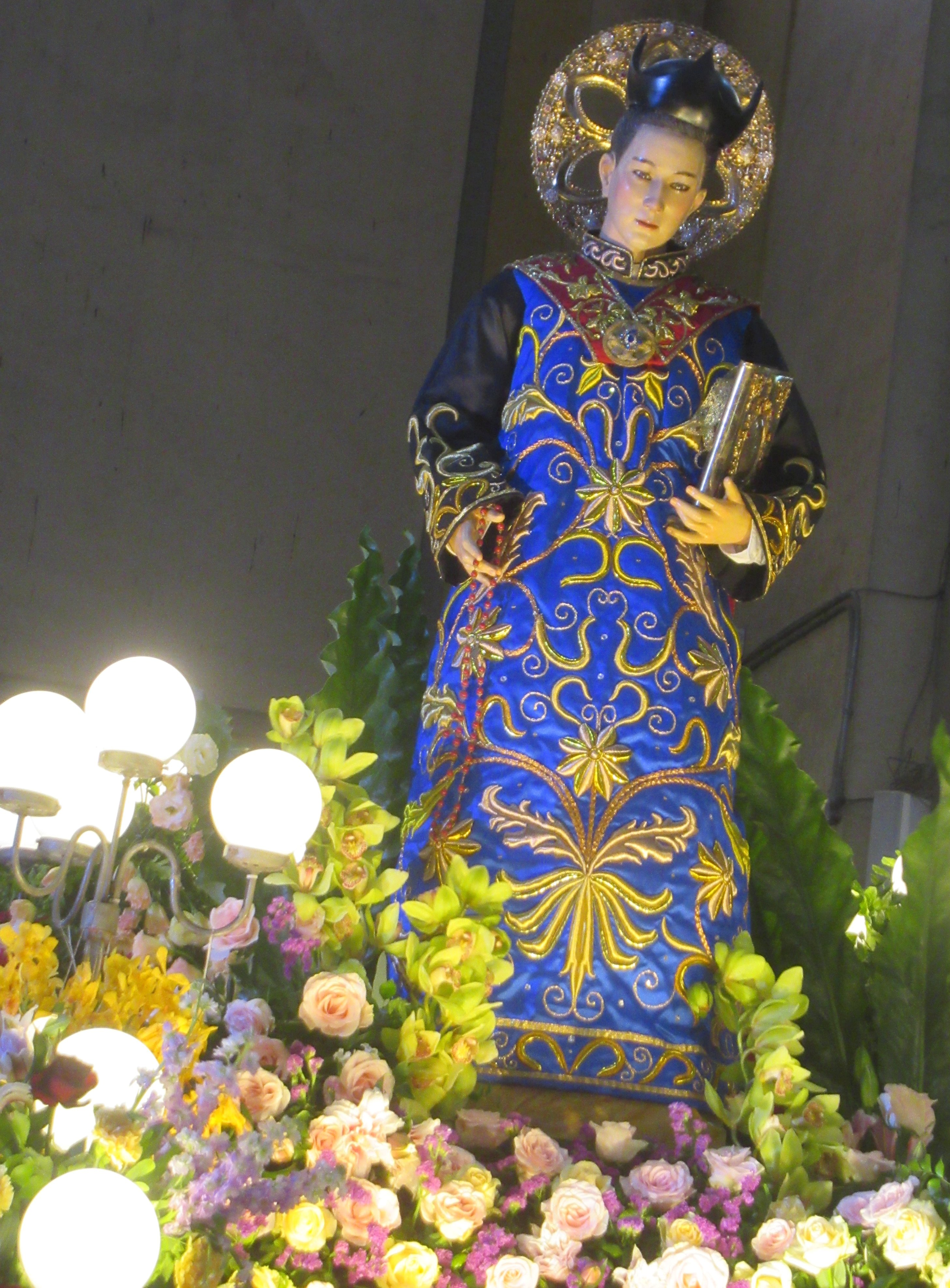
Statue of St. Vicente Liem during the Our Lady of La Naval de Manila at Santo Domingo Church (Quezon City), 2024

== Life ==
Liêm was born at Trà Lũ village, in the phủ of Thiên Trường, Nam Định Province, Tonkin in 1732 to Christian parents, Antôn and Maria Doãn, members of the Tonkinese nobility. When he fell gravely ill several days after his birth, he was baptised by Fr. Chien de Santo Tomas, taking the name of Vincent. He was later brought by his parents to a missionary centre where he learned catechism. In 1738, King Philip V of Spain opened the Colegio de San Juan de Letran and the University of Santo Tomas (UST) in the Philippines to Chinese and Tonkinese students through a scholarship program. The Vicariate Apostolic of Eastern Tonkin, ran by Dominican friars at the time, decided to let Liêm and four other Tonkinese (Jose de Santo Tomas, Juan de Santo Domingo, Pedro Martir, and Pedro de San Jacinto) study in the Philippines under this scholarship.

Vicente took the trivium and the quadrivium in Colegio de San Juan de Letran, now the equivalent of elementary and secondary education. He finished a degree of lector of humanities at Letran. He continued his collegiate education at the University of Santo Tomas while residing at Letran. In September 1753, after completing his studies at Letran, he entered the Dominican order, along with his three Tonkinese companions. A year later, they made their solemn professions. On 28 January 1755, he received the tonsure and minor orders at the Church of Sta. Ana. In 1758, Liêm was ordained a priest for the Dominican order. In September of that year, he passed the examinations to hear confessions. On 3 October, he started his journey back to his homeland and arrived on 20 January 1759.

Upon arriving in his homeland, he was appointed professor at the Trung Linh seminary. On 2 October 1773, he and his two assistants were arrested at "Co Dou". He and his assistants were beaten up, after which they traveled on foot to the village of recorded as "Dou Hoi." There he met another Dominican priest, the Spaniard Jacinto Castañeda. They were presented to the Vice Governor and to the Royal Minister. They were thrown to a cage for a night. The arrival of a High Minister prompted their transfer to Kien Nam, where the King held his court. While under detention, they still managed to preach Catholicism to the people. Later they were taken to Tan Cau, then to the house of Canh Thuy. Finally they were brought to the King where they were tried. Their trial led for the King to be angry and they were thrown to jail. After several days, the King brought down the guilty verdict with the penalty of beheading. The execution occurred on 7 November 1773. After the execution, the Christians who were present at the site carried away the bodies of de la Paz and Castañeda, where they were laid to rest at the town of Trung Linh in Xuan Truong, Nam Định. Several more Christian missionaries were put to death by the Tonkinese authorities.

The process of beatification of de la Paz and Casteñeda, as well as other Dominican martyrs, was initiated through Vicar Apostolic Bishop Ignacio Delgado. They were beatified by Pope Pius X with his feast day on 6 November. Pope John Paul II canonization the Dominican martyrs, along with a total of 117 martyrs in total on 19 June 1988, with the feast day of the group on 24 November.

== See also ==
- Vietnamese Martyrs
- Saint Vicente Liem de la Paz, patron saint archive
- Hội đồng tứ giáo
