= Gorzkie żale =

18th-century Polish Catholic devotion

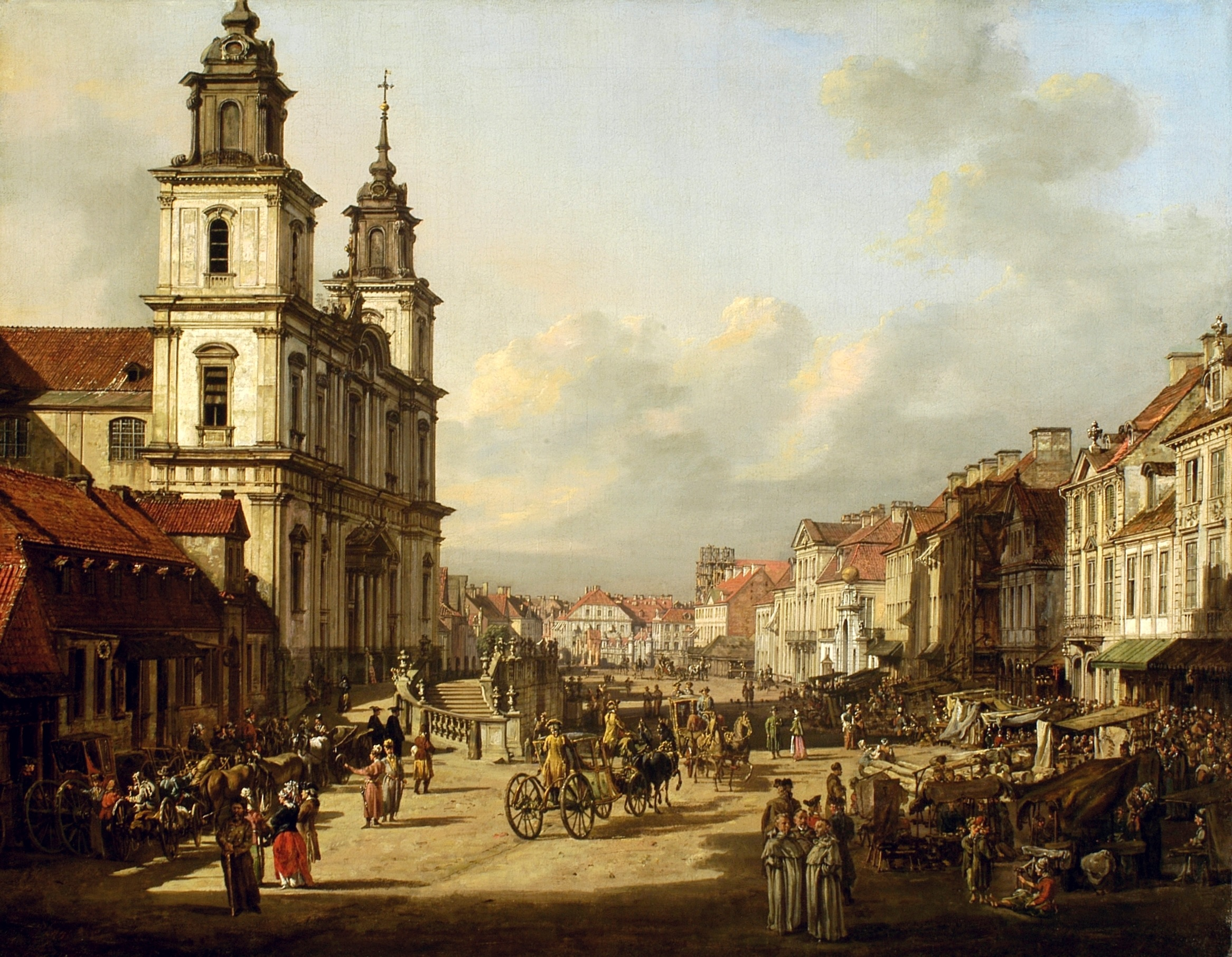
The Basilica of the Holy Cross in Warsaw in Warsaw, where the devotion was first held in 1704, as painted by Bernardo Bellotto, 1778.

Gorzkie żale (Polish pronunciation: [ˈɡɔʂkʲe ˈʐalɛ]), or Bitter Lamentations, is a Catholic devotion containing many hymns that developed out of Poland in the 18th century. The devotion is primarily a sung reflection and meditation on the Passion of Christ and the sorrows of His Blessed Mother. The devotion consists of a three-part cycle, subdivided into five unique parts. One part of the cycle is held on each Sunday in the period of Lent, including Palm Sunday, and the entire ceremony is held on Good Friday. The devotion originated in Holy Cross Church in Warsaw and from there it spread to the whole of Poland.

== History ==
The Gorzkie Żale devotion originated in the early 18th century in Holy Cross Church in Warsaw, Poland. It was primarily a collection of popular songs and melodies used by people in villages around Warsaw to reflect on the Passion of Christ. In 1707 Fr. Lawrence Benik, CM published a booklet in Polish titled: “Snopek Myrry z Ogroda Gethsemańskiego albo żałosne Gorzkiej Męki Syna Bożego [...] rospamiętywanie,” translated, "A bundle of Myrrh from the Garden of Gethsemane, or the lamentation over the Bitter Passion of the Son of God". Myrrh was one of the gifts the Three Wise Men brought to newborn Jesus as the announcement of the passion and the redemptive death of Christ. This publishing is considered to be the beginning of the devotion. For years this Baroque multi-word phrase was used as title of the devotion. Then, with passing time, a title derived from the first words of the initial song (Gorzkie Żale przybywajcie, serca nasze przenikajcie) was used more frequently. Though the title eventually changed to simply "Gorzkie Żale," the original old-Polish language of the devotion was preserved.

== Structure ==
Fr. Bartholomew Tarlo CM, priest of Holy Cross Parish and first Visitor of Province of Poland acknowledged the importance of this devotion, which featured melodies on the Passion of Christ. He ordered to rearrange the songs into a structured liturgical order. The confreres used the structure of the Baroque Divine Office as a pattern. They based the devotion on the morning hour of "Matins" (nowadays it might be similar to Office of Readings) and the Laudes, or "Lauds" prayer. Fr. Benik looked at old Gregorian chorales to arrange the music, but he kept the original folklore character of the melodies. Specialists can find similarities to Gregorian hymnals and chorales. Fr. Lawrence Benik CM described how the devotion should be celebrated. Since the beginning it took place on Sundays of the Lent after either High Mass or Vespers.

In late 18th century some liturgical elements were added making the structure very much like the present one: the exposition of the Blessed Sacrament at the beginning, the singing of the three parts of the hymnals and songs; followed by an occasional sermon called the Passion Sermon. After that there was a procession with candles around the church. Finally the celebrant blessed worshipers with the Blessed Sacrament.

=== Present Day ===
Generally, the Gorzkie Żale devotion is divided into three parts comprising one cycle. The first part is sung on the first and fourth Sundays of Lent, the second part is sung on the second and fifth Sundays of Lent, and the third part is sung on the third Sunday of Lent and Palm Sunday. On Good Friday, all three parts of the entire cycle are sung, though there are variations depending on local custom.

The devotion usually starts with the Exposition of the Blessed Sacrament, followed by the sung introductory hymn: "Pobudka do rozmyślania męki Pańskiej" (English: "A wake-up call to begin meditating Our Lord's Passion"). This hymn is the same for all three parts of the cycle and is presented below.

The introductory hymn "Pobudka"

Polish text	English version
Gorzkie żale, przybywajcie, Serca nasze przenikajcie. (2x) Rozpłyńcie się, me źrenice, Toczcie smutnych łez krynice. (2x)	Let us pray in contemplation, While we sing this lamentation. (2x) With eyes tearful, hearts repenting, Let us grieve with no relenting. (2x)
Słońce, gwiadzy omdlewają, Żałobą się pokrywają. (2x) Płaczą rzewnie Aniołowie, A któż żałość ich wypowie? (2x)	Lo, the sun and stars are fading; sadness, nature all pervading. (2x) Host of Angels, sadly weeping, Who'll explain their deep bereaving? (2x)
Opoki się twarde krają, Zgrobów umarli powstają. (2x) Cóż jest, pytam, co się dzieje? Wszystko stworzenie truchleje. (2x)	Mountains, cliffs and rocks are crumbling; Sealed tombs open, loudly thund'ring. (2x) Why such sorrow, desolation? Overwhelming all creation? (2x)
Na ból męki Chrystusowej Żal przejmuje bez wymowy. (2x) Uderz, Jezu, bez odwłoki W twarde serc naszych opoki. (2x)	'Tis Our Savior's sacred Passion Moving all to deep compassion. (2x) Touch our hearts, O Lord most holy, With contrition, true and lowly. (2x)
Jezu mój, we krwi ran Twoich Obmyj duszę z grzechów moich. (2x) Upał serca mego chłodzę, Gdy w przepaść męki Twej wchodzę. (2x)	By your precious Blood redeem us; From sin, malice, O Lord free us. (2x) May our Lenten lamentations, Curb false ardor and wild passions. (2x)

The subsequent parts are particular to each cycle. The introductory hymn is followed by the spoken "Intencja", or "Intention," a spoken meditative reflection, derived from the "Passion sermon". This "Intention" is followed by another hymn as well as the "Lament duszy nad cierpiącym Jezusem," or the "Lament of the soul on the suffering Jesus". Finally there is the "Rozmowa duszy z Matką Bolesną" or "The Dialogue of the Soul with the Sorrowful Mother" followed by the final refrain, "Któryś za nas cierpiał rany," or "You who suffered wounds for us" sung three times. The celebration is concluded with Benediction and a blessing with the Blessed Sacrament.

== Popularity ==
The devotion of the Gorzkie Żale spread around the territory of Kingdom of Poland and Lithuania very quickly. Wherever Vincentian missioners went and preached recollections and popular missions they brought the Gorzkie Żale with them and planted the devotion in all these places. Soon, the Gorzkie Żale became the central and most traditional Lenten celebration in Polish churches. During three centuries of its history some changes in the melody line were introduced. There were also some attempts to translate the text into other languages, especially English. But after 300 years the Gorzkie Żale remained a typically Polish traditional Lenten devotion piously celebrated in Poland and in most Polish communities abroad. In 2007 there were numerous events in Vincentian locations in Poland, especially in Holy Cross Church in Warsaw, commemorating 300 years of this Lenten devotion. Since the 17th century, a similar tradition known as Ngắm Mùa Chay has developed in the Catholic church in Vietnam.
