= Girolamo Maiorica =

Italian Jesuit missionary

Girolamo Maiorica (Portuguese: Jerónimo Majorica; chữ Nôm: 支由尼模 梅烏移𰙔, chữ Hán: 梅烏理哥; Vietnamese alphabet: Giê-rô-ni-mô Mai-ô-ri-ca / Mai Ô Lý Ca; 1591–1656) was a 17th-century Italian Jesuit missionary to Vietnam. He is known for compiling numerous Roman Catholic works written in the Vietnamese language's demotic chữ Nôm script, both on his own and with assistance from local converts. Maiorica was one of the first authors of original Nôm prose. His works are seen as a milestone in the history of Vietnamese literature.

== Biography ==
Maiorica was born in Naples, either in 1581, 1589, or 1591. He entered the Jesuit order on 19 May 1605. He was ordained a priest by Cardinal Robert Bellarmine in Rome before heading to Lisbon en route to the Far East in 1619.

Maiorica initially stopped in Goa, then arrived in Macau, intending to proselytize in Japan. However, by 1619, Japan had begun persecuting Christians, so he went instead to Makassar and remained there for a year. Afterwards, he returned to Macau and traveled to Fai-Fo (present-day Hội An) in 1624 in the same boat as Alexandre de Rhodes, João Cabral, and two or three other Jesuits. Whereas de Rhodes studied Vietnamese under Francisco de Pina (1585–1625), Maiorica studied Vietnamese at the Jesuit residence in Nước Mặn (today An Nhơn District, Bình Định Province). He proselytized in Đàng Trong (Cochinchina) from 1628, when his superiors sent him back to Macau en route to a new assignment in Japan. He was again unable to make the journey, this time due to poor weather. In 1630, he traveled to Champa, where he was quickly imprisoned. After a Portuguese merchant ransomed him, Maiorica made his way to Cửa Hàn (Danang) via Cambodia.

On 19 October 1631, he went to Thăng Long (Hanoi) with Bernardino Reggio. The next year, Maiorica and Reggio started a printing press to print copies of Matteo Ricci's Chinese-language work, The True Meaning of the Lord of Heaven, as well as a defense of the faith by Francesco Buzomi. The press was destroyed within several months. Maiorica left Thăng Long for Kẻ Rum, in Nghệ country (xứ Nghệ, present-day Nghệ An), to seek converts in the hinterlands. He stopped writing in the early 1640s to focus on his pastoral duties. In the early 1650s, he returned to Thăng Long to serve as the superior of the Tonkin missionary region. In 1653, he was promoted to provincial of the Jesuits' Japan Province (which included Tonkin, Đàng Trong, Makassar, Cambodia, and Hainan island). Although this province was officially based out of Macau, Maiorica administered it from Thăng Long. In January 1656, he fell ill in Thanh Hóa and died on 27 January 1656 in Thăng Long.

== Linguistic influence ==
All but one of the extant, 17th-century Christian works written in chữ Nôm can be positively attributed to Maiorica. These works are seen as a vital resource for research into chữ Nôm, as well as historical dialects, vocabulary, and phonology of Vietnamese. To translate Catholic theological concepts, Maiorica favored plain, commonly understood vocabulary over Sino-Vietnamese vocabulary, even in cases where the latter would have been consistent with the terms used by his Jesuit colleagues in China. For example, he referred to God as Đức Chúa Trời Đất (literally, "Virtuous Lord of Heaven and Earth"; 德主𡗶坦) instead of Thiên Địa Chân Chúa 天地眞主 and to the Eucharist as Mình Thánh ("Holy Body"; 命聖) instead of Thánh Thể 聖體. Today, Thiên Chúa 天主 and Thánh Thể 聖體 are the preferred terms, respectively. Many of the terms he coined would later become popular, such as sự thương khó 事傷𧁷 (passion), rỗi linh hồn 磊靈魂 (salvation of souls), tin kính 信敬 (to believe, appearing in the creeds), khiêm nhường chịu lụy 謙讓召累 (humility and submission), hằng sống 恒𤯩 (eternal life), cả sáng 奇創 (hallowed, appearing in the Lord's Prayer), etc.

== Scholarship ==
Historians made reference to Maiorica's works as early as the mid-17th century. Not long after he died, two official Jesuit publications, one published circa 1660–1673 and the other in 1676, also listed manuscripts under his name. For nearly three centuries after that, Western scholars paid very little attention to him. Philipphê Bỉnh (Felippe do Rosario), a Vietnamese Jesuit priest who spent his final years in Lisbon, provided additional important information about Maiorica's works. Apart from this, no new details emerged from then until the mid-20th century.

A major milestone in research on Maiorica occurred in 1951 when Jesuit historian Georg Schurhammer published an article regarding three early Christian authors in Vietnam: Maiorica, João Ketlâm (Gioan Thanh Minh), and Felippe do Rosario. However, he was unaware that copies of Maiorica's works remain.

Schurhammer's investigation was of interest to researcher Hoàng Xuân Hãn, who was in Europe at the time and read the article. He coincidentally encountered a set of manuscripts that he considered very likely to have been written by Maiorica. This discovery elicited excitement among Vietnamese historians, and several individuals published transliterated reproductions of these works. In the half century since then, progress has been made in verifying the authenticity of, preserving, transliterating, and publishing Maiorica's works, which once were assumed to be completely lost.

== Bibliography ==
Maiorica "left a significant body of writings", being credited as the main author of 45 or 48 Nôm works. Exchanges of letters between Jesuits and from the text itself make clear that the works were written with the assistance of Vietnamese converts. Almost all of these contributors were catechists (called thầy giảng); they were literate and were usually esteemed members of the community before they converted to Christianity. Maiorica's works can be divided into four basic genres: hagiographies, stories adapted from scripture, sermons, and catechetical writings. These works were generally written in prose, except for some prayers written in verse. He translated, adapted, or composed works based on a variety of sources: official Church documents (such as the Vulgate and Roman Missal), writings by Church Fathers, Thomas Aquinas' Summa Theologica, works by fellow Jesuits, and hagiographical books and lore.

Today, only 15 of Maiorica's works remain, totalling 4,200 pages and 1.2 million Nôm characters. A majority is archived in the Bibliothèque nationale de France in Paris.

Most of Maiorica's works are titled in Literary Chinese, even though the contents are written in chữ Nôm. This was a common practice for many chữ Nôm works where the title was formally written in Literary Chinese, but the text is written in Vietnamese. Some texts that were attributed to Maiorica were identified by a phrase that appears in the beginning of some texts, Giê-su hội sĩ Giê-rô-ni-mô Mai-ô-ri-ca thuật 支秋㑹士支由尼模梅烏移𰙔述 (As narrated by Geronimo Maiorica, scholar of the Society of Jesus).

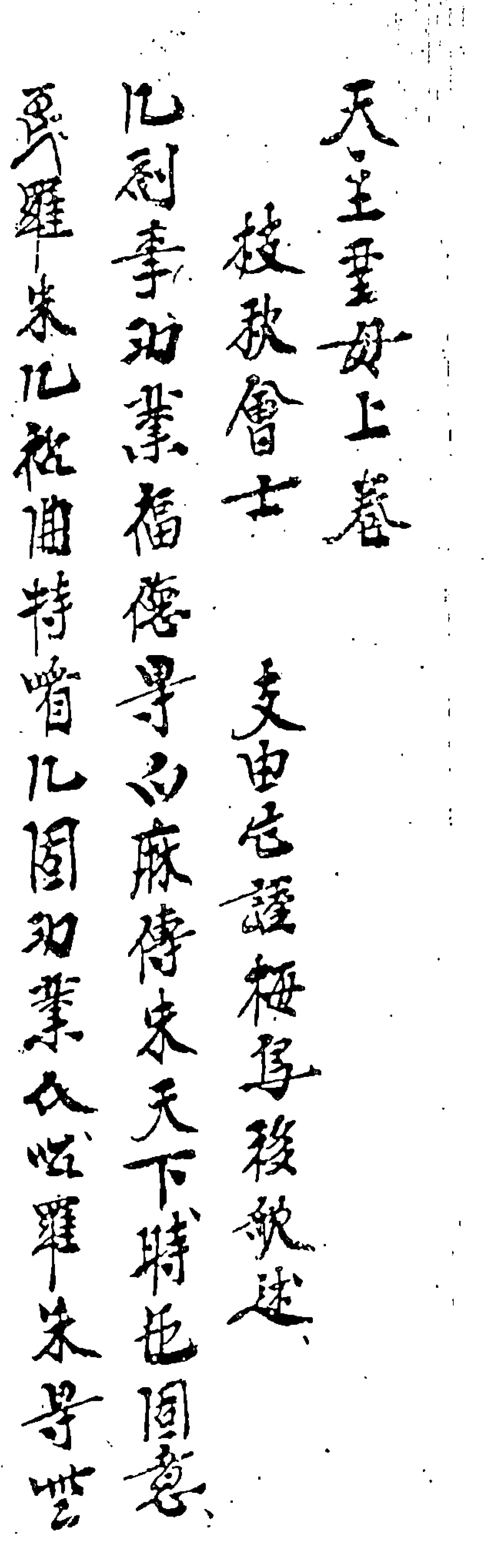
The phrase appears on the second row from the right, Giê-su hội sĩ Giê-rô-ni-mô Mai-ô-ri-ca thuật 技秋㑹士支由尼謨梅烏移𰙔述 (As narrated by Geronimo Maiorica, scholar of the Society of Jesus).

- Đức Chúa Giê-su 德主支秋 [The Virtuous Lord Jesus] – based on the Gospels
- Dọn mình trước chịu Cô-mô-nhong 扽命略召姑模戎 [Preparing Oneself Before Receiving Communion]
- Thiên Chúa thánh giáo hối tội kinh 天主聖教悔罪經 [The Classic of Repentance (according to the Holy Teaching of the Heavenly Lord)]
- Thiên Chúa thánh giáo khải mông 天主聖教啟蒙 [Enlightenment in the Holy Teaching of the Heavenly Lord] (1623) – based on the Italian-language catechism by Robert Bellarmine
- Kinh những lễ mùa Phục sinh 經仍禮務復生 [The Classic of Masses of the Easter Season]
- Qua-da-giê-si-ma, Mùa ăn chay cả 戈椰支差嗎務咹齋奇 [Quadragesima, The Great Season of Fasting]
- Những điều ngắm trong các ngày lễ trọng 仍調吟𥪝各𣈜禮重 [Things to Ponder on the Solemnities]
- Thiên Chúa thánh mẫu 天主聖母 [The Holy Mother of the Heavenly Lord]
- Các Thánh truyện 各聖傳 [Stories of the Saints] (1646)
- Ông Thánh I-na-xu truyện 翁聖⾐那樞傳 [The Story of St. Ignatius] (1634)
- Ông Thánh Phan-chi-cô Xa-vi-e truyện 翁聖幡支姑車為𠲖傳 [The Story of Saint Francis Xavier]
- Truyện Bà Thánh I-sa-ve 傳妑聖衣沙蟡 [The Story of Saint Elizabeth]
- Sách gương phúc gương tội 冊𦎛福𦎛罪 [Book of Models of Happiness and of Sins] (lost)
- Kinh đọc sớm tối 經讀𣌋最 [Matins and Vigil Prayers] (lost)

Additionally, Philipphê Bỉnh states in his writings that Maiorica also participated in an effort to translate the prayers of the Mass into Vietnamese.

== See also ==
- History of writing in Vietnam
