= Cantillation =

Ritual chanting of prayers and responses

Cantillation is the ritual chanting of prayers and responses. It often specifically refers to Jewish Hebrew cantillation. Cantillation sometimes refers to diacritics used in texts that are to be chanted in liturgy.

Cantillation includes:

- Chant
  - Byzantine chant
  - Gallican chant
  - Gregorian chant
  - Old Roman chant
  - Syriac chant
  - Vedic chant
- Hebrew cantillation
- Vietnamese cantillation
- Tajwid (recitation of the Qur'an)
