= Đọc kinh =

Catholics at a Ho Chi Minh City church, praying Hail Mary in đọc kinh style

Đọc kinh (Vietnamese: [ʔɗawk͡p̚˧˨ʔ kïŋ˧˧]) is the Vietnamese Catholic term for reciting a prayer or sacred text. In communal worship settings, đọc kinh is characterized by cantillation, or the ritual chanting of prayers and responses.

== Usage ==
Within the worldwide Roman Catholic Church, Vietnamese liturgical practice is distinct in its extensive use of cantillation: all prayers and responses during the Mass are either sung or chanted, but never spoken. Thus, the Lord's Prayer is recited differently during the Mass than in a private setting.

It is suspected that cantillation in Lao and Hmong Catholic liturgies is due to Vietnamese influence. Cantillation is far from universal among tonal languages, but Fuzhou Catholics in Fujian have a similar practice.

== Structure ==
Vietnamese cantillation is neither composed nor improvised; it follows a formula in which each of the Vietnamese language's six tones corresponds to a specific note or sequence. Depending on the diocese, tones are organized along a scale of two or three notes (dấu trụ). The note for sắc is at least as high as the note for ngang, which in turn is higher than the note for huyền and nặng. The hỏi and ngã tones are vocalized as a melisma from a lower note to a higher note. For example:

| Tone | Note(s) |
|---|---|
| ngang | mi (E) |
| sắc | mi (E) |
| huyền | si (B) |
| nặng | re (D) |
| hỏi | re–mi (D–E) |
| ngã | re–mi (D–E) |

Parishes in the former West Tonkin diocese use the three-note scale of fa-sol-la, so the incipit of the Hail Mary is rendered:

== See also ==
- Buddhist chant (tụng kinh)
