= Francisco de Pina =

Portuguese Jesuit missionary

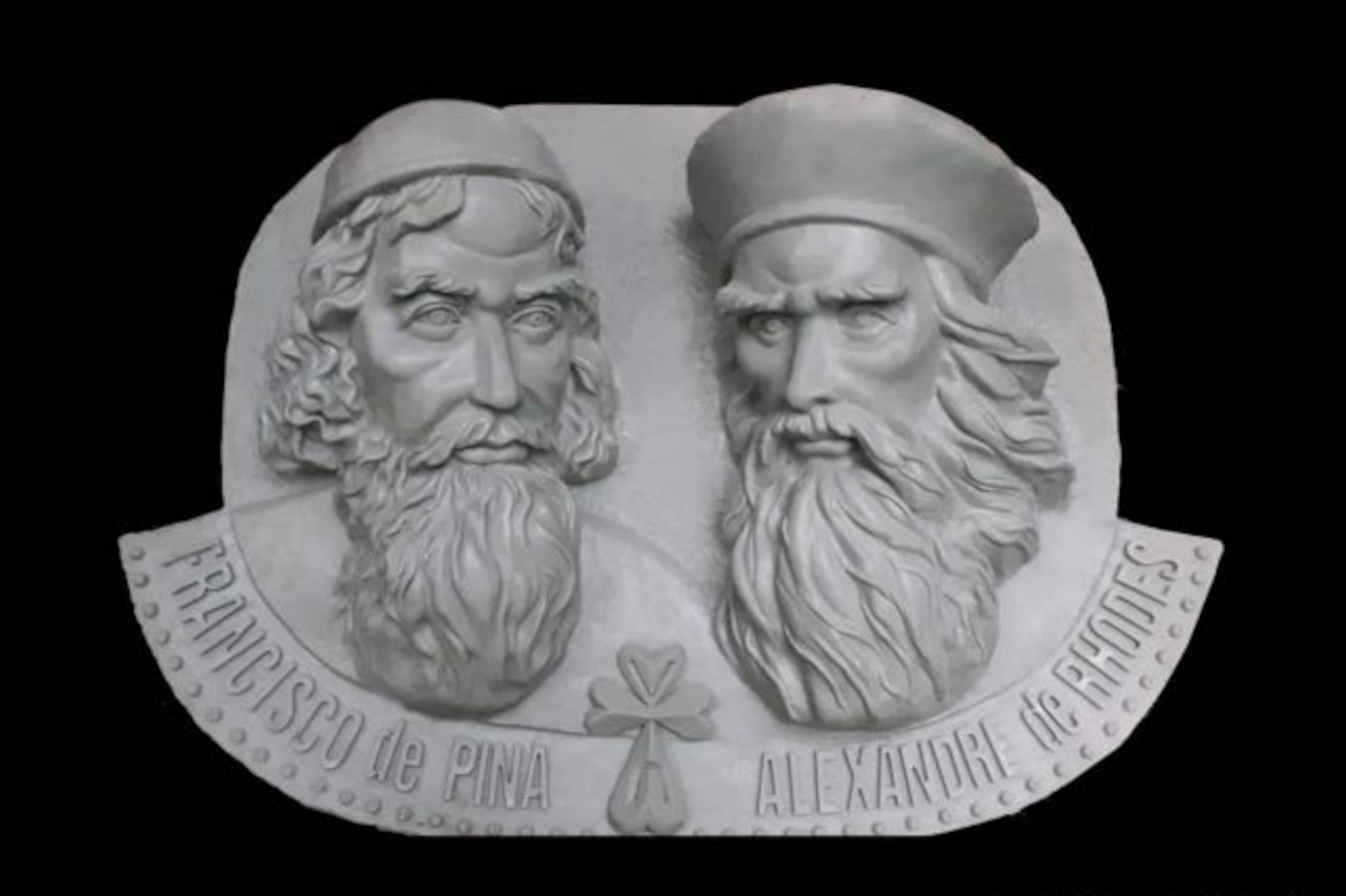
- Francisco de Pina (left) & Alexandre de Rhodes (right), two missionaries that had the great impact on developing the new chữ Quốc ngữ.

Personal life
- Born: 1585 Guarda, Kingdom of Portugal
- Died: 15 December 1625 (aged 39–40) off the coast of Hội An, Vietnam

Religious life
- Denomination: Roman Catholicism

Francisco de Pina (Portuguese pronunciation: [fɾɐ̃ˈsiʃku ðɨ ˈpinɐ]; 1585 – 1625) was a Portuguese Jesuit interpreter, missionary and priest, credited with creating the first Latinized script of the Vietnamese language, which the modern Vietnamese alphabet is based on.

== Biography ==
Francisco de Pina was born in Guarda, Portugal, in 1585 and entered the Jesuit order in 1605. In the years between 1611 and 1617 he studied at St. Paul's College, Macau, where he was exposed to the works of João Rodrigues Tçuzu. The latter was a Portuguese Jesuit who had pioneered the transliteration of Japanese into the Latin alphabet using phonetics of the Portuguese language. João Rodrigues Tçuzu arrived in Macau from Japan in 1614, six years after completing his most famous treatise on Japanese grammar, Arte da Lingoa de Iapam.

Francisco de Pina arrived in Đàng Trong (called Cochinchina by Europeans at the time) in 1617 in order to replace the Jesuit Diogo de Carvalho in the missionary work of evangelization developed together with the Italian Francesco Buzomi in modern Vietnam since 1615. At the time there were two Portuguese Jesuit residences in Đàng Trong: modern Hội An and Qui Nhơn. Pina took residence in Hội An, but his missionary work was spread between the two Jesuit missions.

Francisco de Pina drowned at sea in modern Cửa Đại on 15 December 1625 while trying to rescue guests on a wrecked boat. His body was buried in an unknown location in Hội An.

== Works ==
Although no works of Francisco de Pina survive today, he is considered to be the first European able to speak fluent Vietnamese, a skill which he used in his missionary work. Pina believed that such skill was a fundamental part of the evangelization work, and repeatedly accused his fellow clergymen of not acting in the same manner. Pina pioneered the method of recording the Vietnamese language with Latin characters, which forms the basis of the modern Vietnamese alphabet, while teaching his disciples the Vietnamese language. The most famous of these is Alexandre de Rhodes, who published in 1651 in Rome the Dictionarium Annamiticum Lusitanum et Latinum, a trilingual dictionary between Vietnamese, Portuguese and Latin compiled by Alexandre de Rhodes from the work of various Portuguese Jesuits (among which Gaspar do Amaral, António Barbosa, António de Fontes and Francisco de Pina himself).

Francisco de Pina compiled a first vocabulary of the Vietnamese language in 1619, and reported to his superiors having composed a treatise on orthography and phonetics in 1622 or 1623. Some scholars have argued that Pina is responsible for writing a grammar based on which Honufer Bürgin compiled and edited the text Manuductio ad Linguam Tunkinensem independently of the work of Alexandre de Rhodes. Other scholars have challenged this conclusion by gathering evidence that the Manuductio ad Linguam Tunkinensem was written by Philippus Sibin using the Dictionarium Annamiticum Lusitanum et Latinum of Alexandre de Rhodes as a reference.
