= List of Mennonites =

List of notable Mennonites

This is a list of Mennonites. Mennonites are a group of Anabaptist Christian communities tracing their roots to the epoch of the Radical Reformation.

(To be included on this list, a person must be notable enough to have an already-existing Wikipedia article.)

== General list ==
- Harold S. Bender – professor of theology, Goshen College
- David Bergen – Giller Prize–winning writer
- Travis Bergen – baseball player
- JC Chasez – American solo artist and singer for NSYNC
- Christopher Dock – educator
- Abraham Esau – German physicist
- Howard Dyck – Canadian conductor and broadcaster
- Dietrich Enns – baseball player
- Brendan Fehr – actor; linked to television series Roswell
- Eric Fehr – hockey player
- Henry Friesen – endocrinologist; discovered prolactin
- Jeff Friesen – former hockey player
- Byron Froese – hockey player
- Johann Funk – early Canadian Mennonite bishop
- Joseph Funk – American music teacher and publisher
- Michael Funk – former hockey player
- Lapiso Gedelebo – Ethiopian historian
- Owen Gingerich – Smithsonian astronomer
- Girl Named Tom – winners of season 21 of The Voice
- Steven Goertzen – former hockey player
- Herman op den Graeff – Mennonite community leader, Krefeld (Germany); delegate and signer, Dordrecht Confession of Faith in 1632
- Joseph B. Hagey – bishop
- Vincent Harding – African-American historian, theologian and civil-rights activist
- Hans Herr – bishop
- Jeff Hostetler – National Football League quarterback
- Julia Kasdorf – poet
- Graham Kerr – known as "The Galloping Gourmet"; television personality
- Cindy Klassen – five-time Olympic medalist
- Eduard Klassen – harpist
- Clayton Kratz – relief worker
- Erik Kratz – American former professional baseball catcher, including Milwaukee Brewers
- Alan Kreider – writer; employee, Associated Mennonite Biblical Seminary
- Floyd Landis – professional road bicycle racer
- Elaine Larsen – American jet car drag racer
- John Paul Lederach – professor, international peacebuilding
- Lê Thị Hồng Liên – teacher; former political prisoner
- María Gloria Penayo De Duarte – former First Lady of Paraguay; her husband, Nicanor Duarte, is a nominal Catholic who attends her church
- Dustin Penner – former hockey player
- Casey Plett – writer
- Nguyen Hong Quang – vice president, Mennonite Church in Vietnam
- Richie Regehr – former hockey player
- Robyn Regehr – former hockey player
- A. James Reimer – Canadian Mennonite theologian
- James Reimer – hockey player
- John D. Roth – Mennonite scholar
- Menno Simons – theologian; Mennonitism named for him
- Jerome Monroe Smucker – founder, The J.M. Smucker Company
- Dan Snyder – hockey player
- Gene Stoltzfus – American peace activist; founding director, Christian Peacemaker Teams
- Brad Thiessen – hockey player
- David Toews – hockey player
- Jonathan Toews – hockey player
- Miriam Toews – best-selling writer; winner, 2004 Governor General's Literary Award
- Andrew Unger – novelist; creator and writer, The Daily Bonnet (satirical Mennonite website)
- Garry Unger – former hockey player
- Pierre Widmer – French Mennonite pastor and editor
- Armin Wiebe – writer
- Rudy Wiebe – Canadian writer and professor; raised Mennonite so knew no English until age six
- Harvey L. Wollman – 26th Governor of South Dakota
- John Howard Yoder – theologian and pacifist

== Canadian politicians connected to the Mennonites ==
- Albert Driedger – cabinet minister under Gary Filmon; director, Elim Mennonite Church (Grunthal, Manitoba)
- Jacob Froese – only Manitoba Social Credit Party MLA between 1959 and 1973, and was the party's leader for most if not all of the period from 1959 to 1977
- Kelvin Goertzen – 23rd premier of Manitoba
- Harold Neufeld – cabinet minister under Gary Filmon; chair, Menno Simons College Foundation
- Vic Toews – Conservative Party of Canada member; judge, Court of Queen's Bench of Manitoba
- Brad Wall – former premier of Saskatchewan
- Cornelius Wiebe – first Mennonite to serve in the Manitoba Legislature

Note: Several Canadian political figures have a Mennonite background. This might be more common in Canada than in most nations. This is perhaps most true in the case of Manitoba, though Saskatchewan and British Columbia also have significant Mennonites in politics. As this more concerns "connected to" this may include people who are ethnic Mennonites and not necessarily members of Mennonite churches.

== People of Mennonite ancestry or background ==
These are people of Mennonite ancestry, but who are/were not members of the Mennonite religion. In some cases names, listed here include people whose current status as Mennonites is undetermined.

- Sandra Birdsell – Canadian poet
- Di Brandt – Canadian poet
- Greg Brenneman – former chief executive officer, Burger King
- Dyan Cannon – American actress; father, Ben Friesen, was of Mennonite ancestry
- Arthur Compton – physicist; 1927 Nobel Prize in Physics laureate for his discovery of the Compton effect
- Karl Taylor Compton – physicist, president, Massachusetts Institute of Technology (1930–1948)
- Wilson Martindale Compton – trade-association executive
- John Denver – folk singer-songwriter
- Dwight D. Eisenhower – thirty-fourth president of the United States (1953–1961); Eisenhower's direct ancestor, Hans Nicol Eisenhauer, was a Mennonite who settled in Lancaster, Pennsylvania, in 1741
- Katherine Esau – American botanist
- Patrick Friesen – Canadian poet
- Anna German – Polish singer
- Philip D. Gingerich – paleontologist
- Malcolm Gladwell – English-Canadian journalist, bestselling writer, and speaker; has made a return to religion though not of a specific church at the moment
- Jon Gnagy – American art instructor on television
- Ashley Graham – American plus-size model and television presenter
- Matt Groening – American cartoonist; creator, The Simpsons animated sitcom television series; his father, Homer Groening, was born and raised in a Plautdietsch-speaking Mennonite family from Saskatchewan
- Jonathan Groff – American actor and singer; originated the role of King George in the Broadway musical Hamilton
- Joey Kelly – former member, The Kelly Family (music group)
- James L. Kraft – founder, Kraft Foods
- Milton Hershey – founder, The Hershey Company
- Robyn Regehr – hockey player
- Adolph Rupp – college basketball coach
- Marlin Stutzman – politician; raised Mennonitem but is now Baptist
- Hermann Sudermann – German dramatist and novelist
- Dick Winters – U.S. Army major; World War II commander, Easy Company (depicted in the television miniseries Band of Brothers)

== People incorrectly identified as Mennonite ==
- George Armstrong Custer – erroneously identified as coming from Mennonite background by biographer Milo Milton Quaife
