= Christianity in Vietnam =

Christianity was first introduced to Vietnam in the 16th century. Christians represent a significant minority in Vietnam: Catholics and Protestants were reported to compose 7% and 2% of the country's population respectively in 2020.

== Catholicism ==
=== Foundation period ===
In the 10th century, some 'Nestorian' Christian priests had visited Vietnam. The first Catholic missionaries visited Vietnam from Portugal and Spain in the 16th century. In 1524, Portuguese merchant Duarte Coelho's fleet arrived in Hội An, central Vietnam, to trade, bringing along Catholic missionaries. A missionary named I-nê-khu arrived in Nam Định, northern Vietnam, in 1533.

The earliest missions did not bring very impressive results. Only after the arrival of Jesuits in the first decades of the 17th century did Christianity begin to establish itself among the local populations within the domains of both Đàng Ngoài (Tonkin) and Đàng Trong (Cochinchina or Quinan). These missionaries were mainly Italians, Portuguese, and Japanese. Two priests, Francesco Buzomi and Diogo Carvalho, established the first Catholic community in Hội An in 1615. Between 1627 and 1630, Avignonese Alexandre de Rhodes and Portuguese Pero Marques converted more than 6,000 people in Tonkin. These Jesuit activities were not always welcomed by the two rival governments of Vietnam. In May 1630, Lord Trịnh Tráng of Tonkin issued an order to expel the Jesuits. In 1639, some Japanese Christians in Hội An assisted in a revolt against the government; therefore, Lord Nguyễn Phúc Lan of Cochinchina ordered the Jesuits to leave his domain.

In the early 17th century, Jesuit missionaries including Francisco de Pina, Gaspar do Amaral, Antonio Barbosa, and de Rhodes developed an alphabet for the Vietnamese language, using the Latin script with added diacritic marks. This writing system continues to be used today, and is called chữ Quốc ngữ (literally, "national language script"). Meanwhile, the traditional chữ Nôm, in which Girolamo Maiorica was an expert, was the main script conveying Catholic faith to the Vietnamese until the late 19th century.

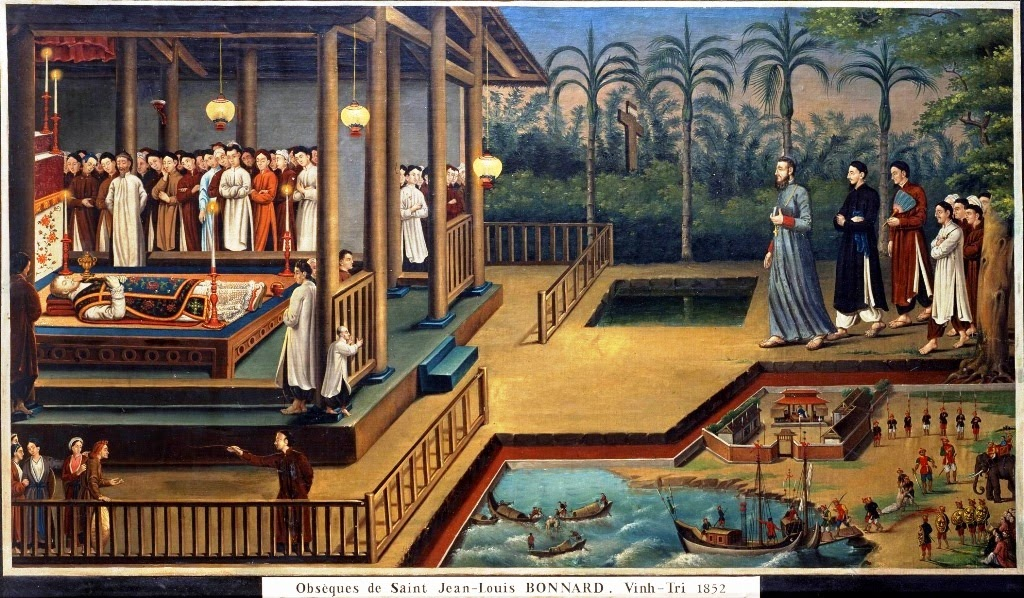
The martyrdom and funeral of Jean-Louis Bonnard (d. 1852), one of the Vietnamese Martyr Saints.

Since the late 17th century, French missionaries of the Paris Foreign Missions Society and Spanish missionaries of the Dominican Order were gradually taking the role of the evangelization in Vietnam. Other missionaries active in pre-modern Vietnam were Franciscans (in Cochinchina), Italian Dominicans & Discalced Augustinians (in Eastern Tonkin), and those sent by the Propaganda Fide.

=== Modern period ===
The French missionary and Titular Bishop of Adran Pierre Pigneau de Behaine, who had come to evangelize in Đàng Trong (known to the Europeans as Cochinchina, played a role in Vietnamese history towards the end of the 18th century. Pigneau would ingratiate himself to and eventually become confidant to Nguyễn Ánh, the last of the Nguyễn lords, then engaged in a civil war. Pigneau hoped that with a Nguyễn Ánh victory, he would gain concessions for the Catholic Church in Vietnam. A recent study suggests that his contribution to Ánh's success was not as it was conventionally believed to have been.

In August 1798, Emperor Cảnh Thịnh of the Tây Sơn dynasty in Huế, suspecting that Catholic civilians in Quảng Trị supported and allied with his enemy Nguyễn Ánh, who tolerated Christianity, ordered soldiers to carry out a pogrom against the Catholics. More than 10,000 Catholic civilians in Quảng Trị were massacred; it was during this time that a Marian apparition of Our Lady of La Vang was reported. Pigneau and other missionaries bought military supplies, enlisted European soldiers for Nguyễn Ánh, and took part in military operations.

Nguyễn Ánh conquered Vietnam and became Emperor Gia Long to establish the Nguyễn dynasty. He tolerated the Catholic faith and permitted unimpeded missionary activities out of respect for his foreign benefactors. Missionary activity was dominated by the Spanish in Tonkin and the French in the central and southern regions. At the time of Gia Long's death, there were six European bishops in Vietnam. The population of Christians was estimated at 300,000 in Tonkin and 60,000 in Cochinchina.

This success would not last, however. Seeking to limit Catholic influence, Gia Long appointed Minh Mạng as his successor for his deeply conservative Confucianism; his first son's lineage had converted to Catholicism and abandoned their Confucian heritage. A power struggle developed between Minh Mạng and pro-Catholic, pro-Western officials who wanted to maintain the power they had been given by Gia Long. Eventually, 2,000 Vietnamese Catholic troops fought under the command of Father Nguyễn Văn Tâm in an attempt to depose Minh Mạng and install a Catholic "emperor".

The revolt was put down, and restrictions were placed on Catholicism. Persistent rebellions occurred throughout the early period of the Nguyễn dynasty, many led by Catholic priests intent on installing a Christian monarch. During the French colonial campaign against Vietnam from 1858 to 1883, many Catholics joined with the French in helping to establish colonialism by fighting against the Nguyễn government. Once a French protectorate was established, the Catholics were rewarded with preferential treatment in government posts and education, and the church was given vast tracts of royal land that had been seized.

After the victorious overthrow of French rule and the country's temporary division in the mid-1950s, Catholicism declined in the North, where the Communists categorized it as a reactionary force opposed to both national liberation as well as social progress. In 1954, an agreement between North and South Vietnam was settled, allowing for civilians of either sides to migrate to the other. Many Catholics from the North, mostly through Operation Passage to Freedom, migrated to the South, wherein they were welcomed by President Ngô Đình Diệm, who promoted it as an important "bulwark" against North Vietnam. Diệm, whose brother was Archbishop Ngô Đình Thục, gave extra rights to the Catholic Church, consecrated the nation to the Virgin Mary, and preferentially promoted Catholic military officers and public servants, while severely restricting the practice of Buddhism and allowing Catholic paramilitaries to demolish sacred Buddhist temples and pagodas. In 1955, approximately 600,000 Catholics remained in the North after an estimated 650,000 had fled to the South in Operation Passage to Freedom.

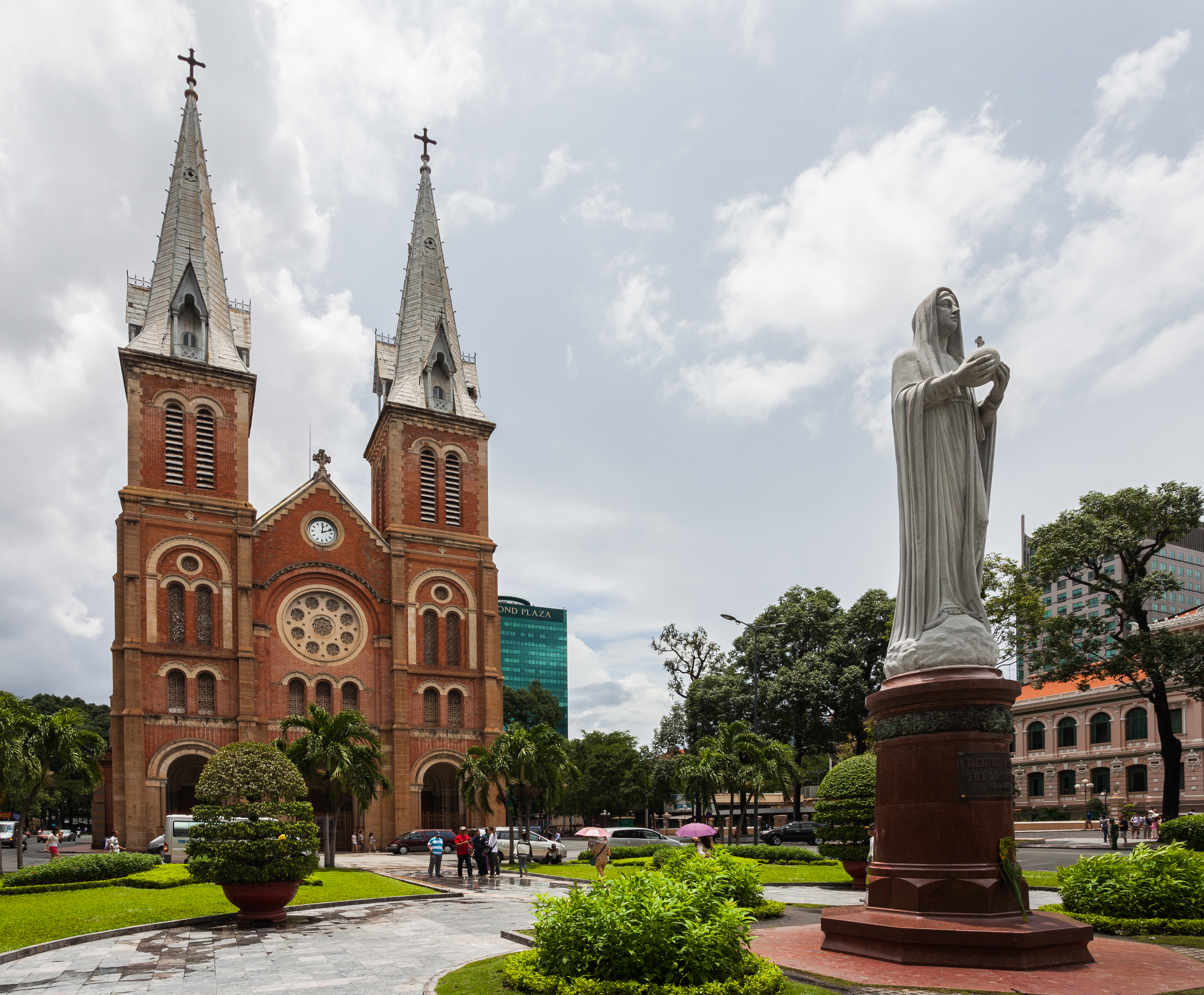
Notre Dame Cathedral, Saigon.

In 1975, after the collapse of South Vietnam, Communist authorities reunited the country by military force and claimed that the religious activities of Roman Catholics were stabilized and that there was no religious persecution. Meanwhile, the communists acted to isolate and neutralize hard-core opposition within local Catholics-to-party policy and to persuade less-strongly-opposed factions to join a party-controlled "renovation and reconciliation" movement. A significant number of Vietnamese Roman Catholics, however, remained opposed to communist authority. Since Đổi mới reforms, the communist government alternates its treatment of Roman Catholics.

In 1980, the Catholic Bishops' Conference of Vietnam was established. In 1988, 117 Catholics, representing hundred thousands of Vietnamese martyrs who had died for their faith, were canonized by Pope John Paul II.

== Protestantism ==
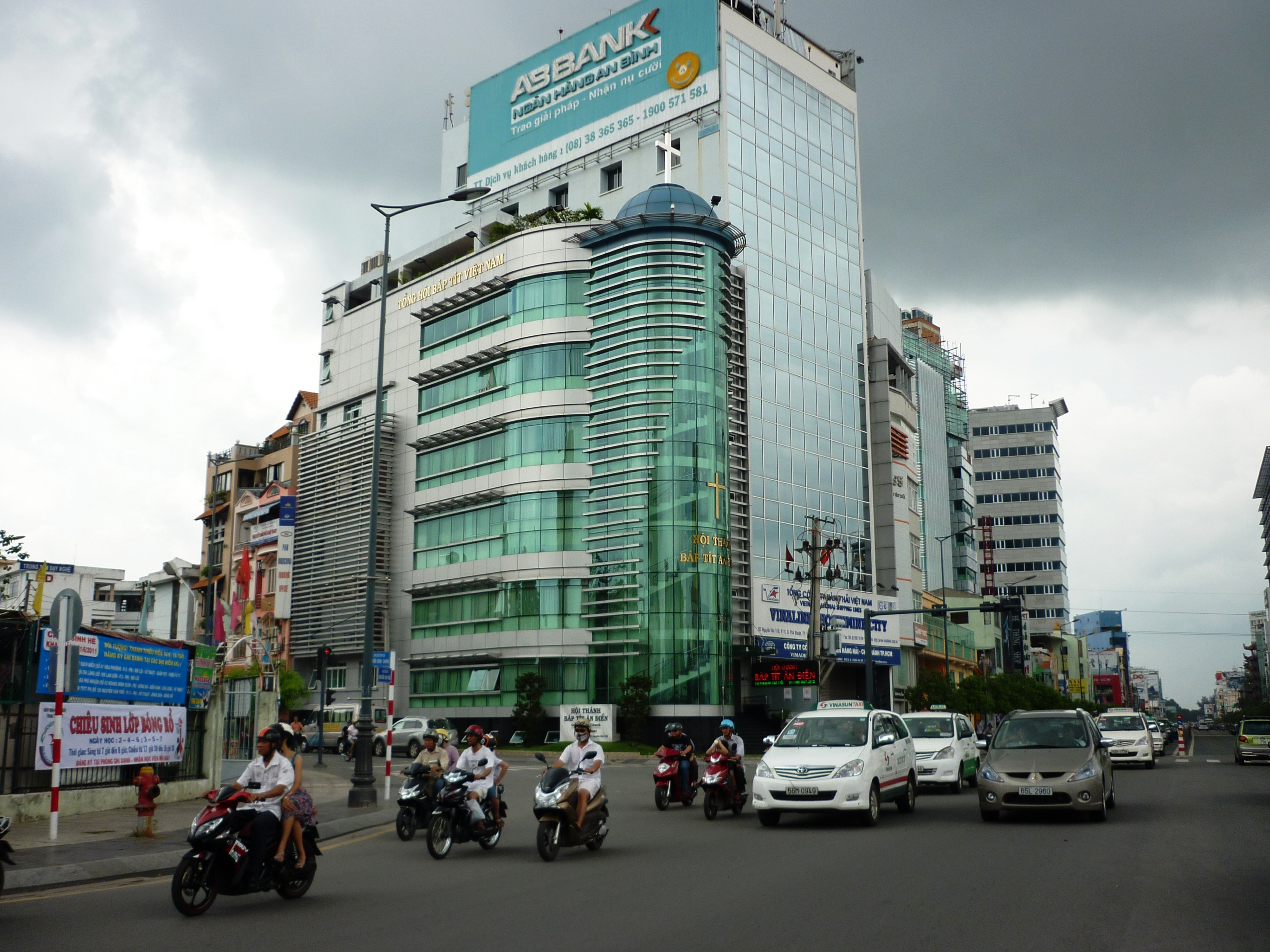
A Baptist church in Ho Chi Minh City.

Protestantism was introduced in 1911 to Đà Nẵng by Canadian missionary Robert A. Jaffray. As part of the Christian and Missionary Alliance, over 100 missionaries were sent to Vietnam, assisting the faith's growth in the country. Churches from this mission founded the Evangelical Church of Indochina in 1927. Due to the separation of the country in two in 1954, the latter was renamed the Evangelical Church of Vietnam North (ECVN), and officially recognized by the government in 1963. Southern churches founded the Evangelical Church of Vietnam South (SECV), recognized in 2001.

The Baptist Convention of Vietnam has its origins in an American mission of the International Mission Board in 1959, in Ho Chi Minh City. It is officially founded in 1989. According to a census published by the association in 2023, it claimed 509 churches and 51,000 members.

By 1967, a number of Protestant communities were represented, mainly within South Vietnam. These communities included the French Reformed Church, Anglican–Episcopalian, Christian and Missionary Alliance, Baptists, Church of Christ, Worldwide Evangelization Crusade, and Seventh-day Adventists. Other Protestant associations were also represented in some social services and welfare agencies. In 1967, there were 150,000 Protestant adherents in South Vietnam, representing about 1% of the total population.

Protestant communities in the North decreased in membership to about 1,200 by the end of the Vietnam War. Several Protestant church properties were confiscated during the communist takeover of South Vietnam in 1975.

In the early 1980s, Protestants were mostly located in the Montagnard communities in southern Vietnam's central highlands.

Present estimates of the number of Protestants range from the official government figure of 500,000 to claims by churches of 1,600,000 or more. The two officially recognized Protestant churches are the Southern Evangelical Church of Vietnam (SECV), recognized in 2001, and the smaller Evangelical Church of Vietnam North (ECVN), recognized since 1963. The SECV has affiliated churches in the southern provinces of the country.

In 2022, local churches estimated that two-thirds of Protestants were members of ethnic minorities, including Hmong, Thai, Dzao and others in the Northwest Highlands, as well as members of ethnic minority groups of the Central Highlands (Ede, Jarai, Sedang and M'nong, among others).

At least 50% of the current Protestant population is composed of members of tribal groups; the Vietnamese government's treatments towards them is varied. The tribal Protestants in Northern Vietnam do not face government persecution, but Protestant southern tribe members, notably the Hmong and H're, suffer from some religious persecution. In May 2006, over 300 Montagnard people remained in Vietnamese prisons for their faith. A young Hroi man who refused to reject his Christian faith reportedly died from injuries received while under official interrogation in April 2007.

Mennonite and Baptist movements were officially recognized by Hanoi in October 2007, which was seen as some improvement of religious freedom in the country. Pastor Nguyen Quang Trung, provisional president of the Vietnam Mennonite Church, taking part in the official ceremony of the above authorization, quoted his Church's motto: "Living the Gospel, worshipping God, and serving the nation.".

== Eastern Orthodoxy ==
Orthodox Christianity in Vietnam is represented by four parishes of the Russian Orthodox Church: one in Vung Tau, named after the icon of Our Lady of Kazan, where there are many Russian-speaking employees of the Russian-Vietnamese joint venture "Vietsovpetro", a parish of Xenia of Saint Petersburg in Hanoi, a parish of Protection of Our Most Holy Lady Theotokos and Ever-Virgin Mary in Ho Chi Minh City, and a parish named after Saint Nicholas in Nha Trang. These parishes are included in jurisdiction of the Diocese of the Philippines and Vietnam belonging to the Russian Patriarchal Exarchate in South-East Asia (established on December 28, 2018, by its Holy Synod).

The earliest parish, named after Our Lady of Kazan icon, was opened in 2002 with the blessing of the Holy Synod of the Russian Orthodox Church, which had been given in Troitse-Sergiyeva Lavra.

The representatives of foreign relations department and some other structures of the Russian Orthodox Church from time to time come to Vietnam (Hanoi, Ho Chi Minh city and Vũng Tàu) to conduct Orthodox divine services mostly among Russian-speaking community there.

== Others ==
New religious movements such as Jehovah's Witnesses, The Church of Jesus Christ of Latter-day Saints, Eastern Lightning, World Mission Society Church of God, and Shincheonji Church of Jesus are also active in Vietnam.

== Bible translations ==
Seventeenth-century Jesuit missionaries were the first to proclaim the Gospel in the Vietnamese language. Girolamo Maiorica compiled the first chữ Nôm catechism (Thiên Chúa thánh giáo khải mông 天主聖教啟蒙) in 1623, and Alexandre de Rhodes printed the first texts in chữ Quốc ngữ, including a bilingual catechism, in Rome in 1651. However, the Bible was not systematically translated. Some portions of the Bible may have been translated and printed in Thailand in 1872.

Jean Bonet, author of a Dictionnaire Annamite-français, translated the Gospel of Luke from French to Vietnamese in 1890. The first translation from Latin was that of Albert Schlicklin (1916), and the first from Greek that of William Cadman (New Testament 1923, Old Testament 1934). The Schilicklin and Cadman Bibles remain the basis of the standard Catholic and Protestant versions today.

The organized work of United Bible Societies in Vietnam began in 1890. In 1966 the Vietnamese Bible Society was established. These societies distributed 53,170 copies of the Bible and 120,170 copies of the New Testament in Vietnamese within the country in 2005.

In 2017 Jehovah's Witnesses released the entire New World Translation of the Bible in Vietnamese.

== Persecution ==
The historical treatment of Christians in Vietnam has varied over time due to historical, tribal or political forces, both internal and external of the Vietnamese nation.

In the 16th and early 17th centuries, during the Later Lê dynasty, Christians were tolerated. The level of tolerance, however, started to change when the Trịnh lords and Nguyễn lords divided the country. In particular, the Trịnh Lords were more hostile against the Christians and expelled Christian missionaries out the country. In contrast, their Nguyễn rivals were more tolerant of Christians, though not without skepticism. This resulted in more Christians in the south than in the north of Vietnam, a situation that continued from 17th century onward. Prince Nguyễn Ánh, who later became Emperor Gia Long and founded the Nguyễn dynasty from the remnant of old Nguyễn lords, was particularly tolerant of Christians.

However, the persecution of Christians increased with the death of Gia Long, when successive Nguyễn emperors imprisoned, murdered and oppressed Christians Brutal treatment of Christians by the Nguyễn rulers induced French military action in 1858 and ultimately the French conquest of Vietnam. Although many pre-20th century rebellions against France sought to unify Vietnamese regardless of faith, many Vietnamese Christians supported France.

During the French protectorate, the French authority was conventionally viewed as favoring Christians in the country. During the First Indochina War, the communist-led Việt Minh were hostile against those who did not support independence of Vietnam under their rule. Communists accused many Vietnamese Christians of harboring pro-French sentiments. Thus the Viet Minh justified their persecution of Christians as a by-product of the anti-colonial struggle. "Orthodox" historiography therefore insisted that this was not necessarily religious persecution. In fact, Vietnamese Catholics unanimously supported Vietnam's independence. They initially fought along with the Viet Minh, but were later divided on how to resist the French reconquest of their country when the First Indochina War became a hot spot of the Cold War.

In the aftermath of the First Indochina War, many Christians fled Communist rule in the North, further increasing the Christian population in South Vietnam. South Vietnam's President Ngô Đình Diệm, however, continued to antagonize non-Christians, empowering Christians in the military and civil service and beginning systematic repression of non-Christian, particularly Buddhist, religious practice. Many officials in South Vietnam's government were Christians, and they were given exclusive power. This resulted in the Buddhist crisis and, eventually, the overthrow of his repressive Christian-dominated government. However, this did not eliminate the influence of Christians across the South, and Christians continued to dominate sociopolitical life in the South until 1975.

After 1975, the Communists began to prohibit religious practice, but particularly targeted Christians. Many Vietnamese boat people were Christians, and Christians formed 75% of Vietnamese refugees who fled the country. This resulted in a Western-oriented Vietnamese diaspora still relevant today, as many Vietnamese emigrants in Western Europe, Canada and the United States, belong to Christian sects and heavily oppose Communist rule; by contrast, the Vietnamese diaspora in the former Eastern block is more Buddhist influenced.

Since Đổi mới reforms of 1986, Christianity has started to see a revival, but the Communist government's policies toward Christians are difficult for many Christians and sometimes dangerous. Christians continue to be seen as a threat due to their previous support for the French and Americans. The rapid spread of christianity among the Hmong people has caused governmental concern because of a potential decrease in ethnic tourism owing to a decline in traditional Hmong practices. However, at the same time, the government has lifted some restrictions on religious practices. In particular, Christians can celebrate holidays like Easter and Thanksgiving, and gatherings in churches are common among Christians.

In the past Christian foreign missionaries were not allowed to proselytize or perform religious activities without government approval.

Vietnam is now maintaining a semi-formal relation with the Vatican, a major breakthrough in contrast to other communist countries of China, Laos and North Korea. The Government of Vietnam reached an agreement with the Vatican for further normalization in 2018, which allowed the Holy See to have a permanent representative in Vietnam in the future.

=== Freedom of religion ===
In 2023, the country was scored 1 out of 4 for religious freedom. In the same year it was ranked as the 25th most difficult place in the world to be a Christian.

== See also ==
- Bible translations into Vietnamese
- Vietnamese Martyrs
- Religion in Vietnam
