= Bible translations into Vietnamese =

The modern Vietnamese alphabet chữ Quốc ngữ was created by Portuguese and Italian Jesuit missionaries and institutionalized by Alexandre de Rhodes with the first printing of Catholic texts in Vietnamese in 1651, but not the Bible. Some New Testament extracts were translated and printed in catechisms in Thailand in 1872.

== History ==
Jean Bonet (1844–1907), of the Institut national des langues et civilisations orientales, Paris, translated the Gospel of Luke from French to Vietnamese in 1890 for the Protestant Convention in Paris.

In 1916, the Catholic Church published Albert Schlicklin's Latin-Vietnamese parallel text Bible in Paris by the Paris Foreign Missions Society. Known under Schlicklin's Vietnamese name Cố Chính Linh, the Cố Chính Linh version was still the most used Bible among Catholics in 1970s.

The organized work of British and Foreign Bible Society in Vietnam began in 1890. Their agent Walter J. James completed Mark, John, and Acts, but government leaders restricted distribution. The first translation from Greek, and still the standard Protestant Vietnamese version, Kinh Thánh Bản Truyền Thống, was principally done by Grace Hazenberg Cadman and John Drange Olsen (New Testament 1923, Old Testament 1926). Grace and her husband William Cadman, who managed the Bible printing in Hanoi, worked for the Christian and Missionary Alliance (CMA) and co-operated with the British and Foreign Bible Society. Grace "began a fresh translation" in 1917. The whole Bible was published in 1934 and is published by the Bible Society in Vietnam as the "Old Version" and uses an archaic, traditional vocabulary of Vietnamese.

In 1966, the Vietnamese Bible Society was established. The Bible societies distributed 53,170 Bible examples and 120,170 New Testament examples in Vietnamese within the country in 2005.

In 1977, the Translating Team of the Liturgy of the Hours (Phiên dịch Các Giờ kinh Phụng vụ, NPD-CGKPV), a working group established in 1971 to translate the Liturgy of the Hours, started translating the New Testament. It had been completed in 1993 and had the permission to publish one year later; after that, the whole Bible translation with some short references had been completed in 1998. This version, which has been published since 1999, is named KPA and is the most used Catholic Bible in Vietnam nowadays. The group has been continuing to revise it in the version called KPB (Vietnamese Study Translation Edition).

Before NPD-CGKPV, there were 5 complete Catholic Bible translations, all by individual priests: Albert Schlicklin (1913), Gérard Gagnon (1963), Trần Đức Huân (1970), Nguyễn Thế Thuấn (1976), and Cardinal Trịnh Văn Căn (1985).

Kinh Thánh Hiện Đại (KTHD) (Modern Bible): This is a translation of The Living Bible from English into Vietnamese, the work of a single dedicated Vietnamese pastor, and was published in 1994 by the International Bible Society (now Biblica, Inc.)

Kinh Thánh Bản Dịch Mới (NVB) (New Vietnamese Bible): This version is published by the Vietnamese Bible Society. The NVB New Testament was translated from the Greek New Testament, Third Edition, United Bible Societies, 1983 edition. The NVB Old Testament was translated from the Biblia Hebraica Stutgatensia, 1983 Edition. Both were translated by a committee of nine Vietnamese theologians trained in Greek and Hebrew who were educated in both Vietnam and the United States of America and serve churches of different denominations. The translators worked under the principles, procedures and leadership of the United Bible Societies. The Wycliffe Translators provided training and technical support. The language is not archaic. It was first published in 2001 and, like the 1925/1934 version above, is also published by the Vietnamese Bible Society which sells it in Vietnam as the "New Version".

The Revised Vietnamese Version Bible (RVV11): This translation, published by the United Bible Societies (UBS), was published in 2010. It is not a new translation, but is a revision of the traditional 1925/1934 version, done by a UBS translation team to translate from the more archaic Vietnamese language to a more current Vietnamese language. Unlike the NVB, below, it is not a Greek/Hebrew to Vietnamese translation. It is a Vietnamese to Vietnamese translation.

On July 7, 2011, Jehovah's Witnesses released the New World Translation of the Christian Greek Scriptures in Vietnamese called Kinh Thánh—Bản dịch Thế Giới Mới (Ma-thi-ơ đến Khải huyền). This Bible was a translation of the Christian Greek Scriptures, as the New Testament is known, based on the English 1984 edition of the New World Translation of the Holy Scriptures which was released at the “Kingdom Increase” District Conventions of Jehovah's Witnesses on 1984 in the United States.

On February 4, 2017, Jehovah's Witnesses released the complete Bible with Hebrew-Aramaic Scriptures, and revised translation of the Christian Greek Scriptures in Vietnamese, under the name Kinh Thánh—Bản dịch Thế Giới Mới (NWT). This Bible is based on the English 2013 revision of the New World Translation of the Holy Scriptures which was released at the 129th annual meeting of the Watch Tower Bible and Tract Society of Pennsylvania on October 5 and 6, 2013 in the Assembly Hall of Jehovah's Witnesses, Jersey City, New Jersey, U.S.A. This revised edition in Vietnamese includes the use of more modern and understandable language, clarified Biblical expression and appendices.

Thánh Kinh: Bản Phổ thông™ (BPT) (Vietnamese Easy-to-Read Version): This is another Vietnamese translation of the Bible. This is a simpler, “easy to read” version, which was published by Bible League International in 2013.

== Text examples ==
Translation	John 3:16
Kinh Thánh - Bản dịch 1926	Vì Ðức Chúa Trời yêu thương thế gian, đến nỗi đã ban Con một của Ngài, hầu cho hễ ai tin Con ấy không bị hư mất mà được sự sống đời đời.
Kinh Thánh - Bản dịch của Nhóm phiên dịch các giờ kinh phụng vụ, KPA (1994)	Thiên Chúa yêu thế gian đến nỗi đã ban Con Một, để ai tin vào Con của Người thì khỏi phải chết, nhưng được sống muôn đời.
Kinh Thánh—Bản dịch Thế Giới Mới (Ma-thi-ơ đến Khải huyền) (2011)	Vì Ðức Chúa Trời yêu thương thế gian đến độ đã ban Con một của ngài cho họ, để ai thể hiện đức tin nơi Con ấy sẽ không bị hủy diệt mà được sống đời đời.
Kinh Thánh—Bản dịch Thế Giới Mới (NWT), (2017)	Vì Đức Chúa Trời yêu thương thế gian đến nỗi đã ban Con một của ngài, để ai thể hiện đức tin nơi Con ấy sẽ không bị hủy diệt mà có được sự sống vĩnh cửu.
