= Hải Dương province =

Province of Vietnam

Hải Dương
- Province
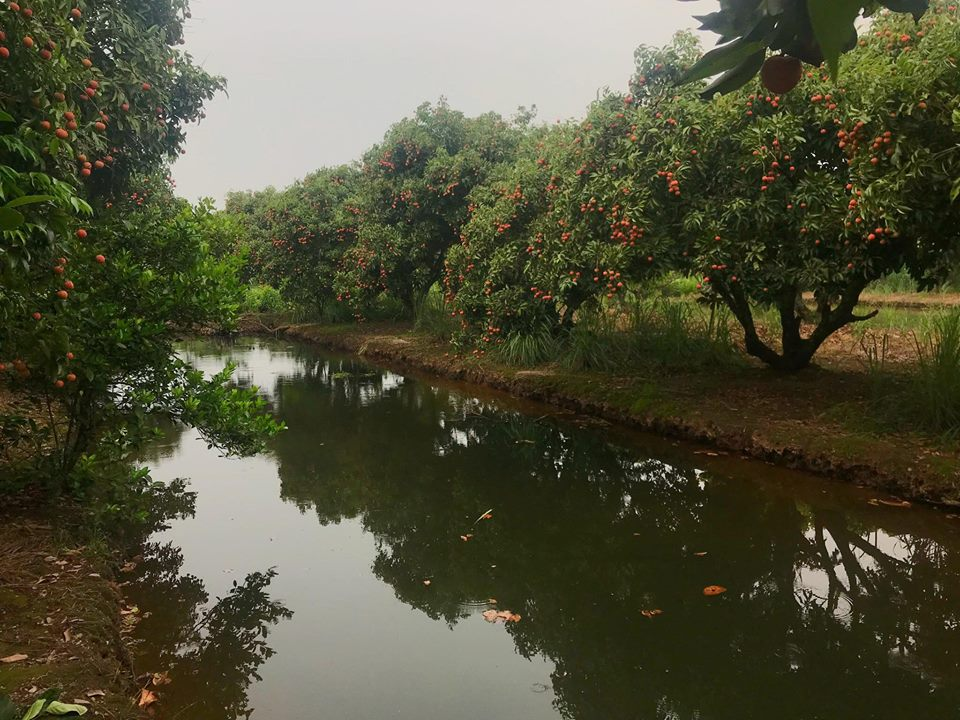
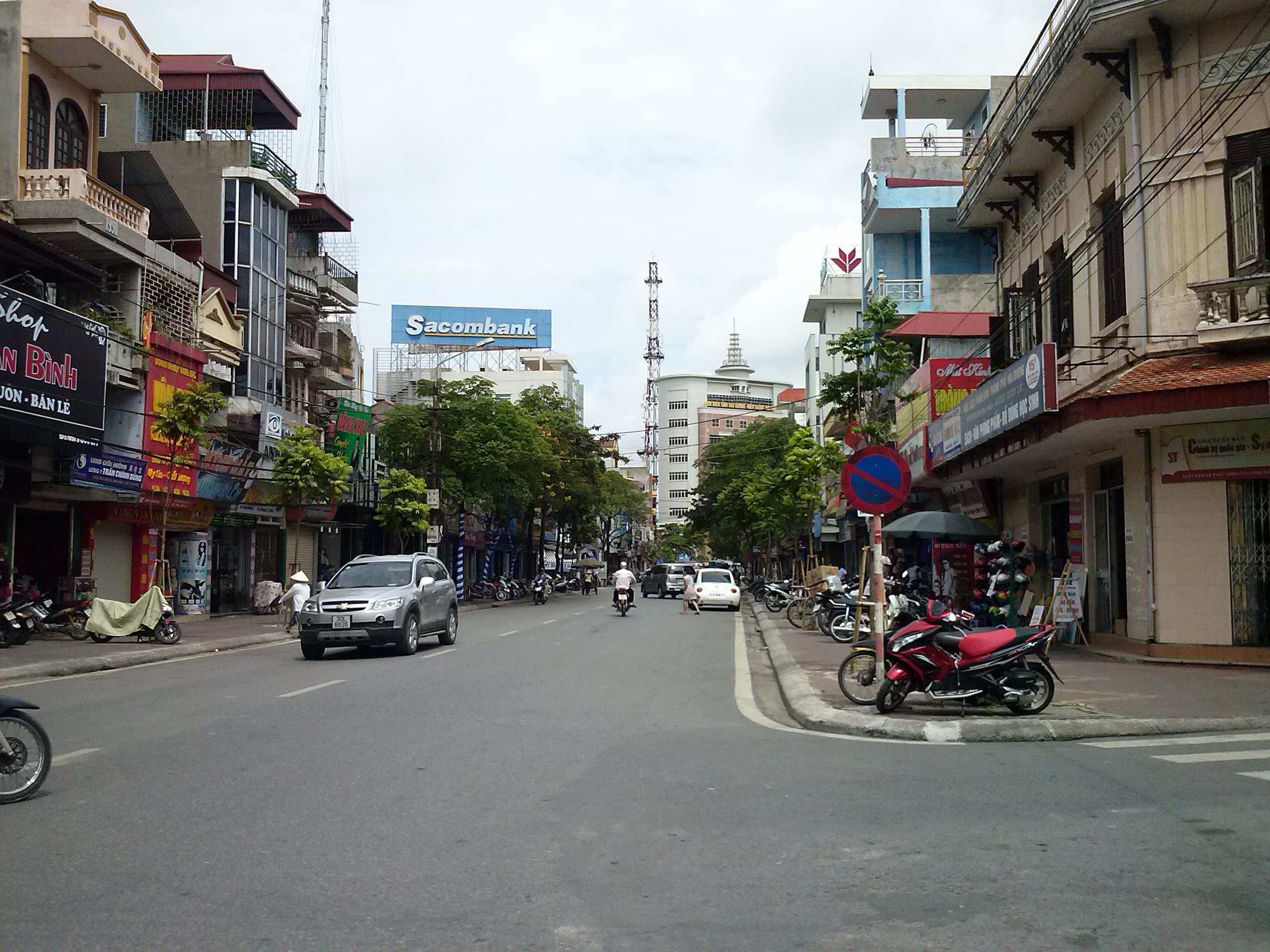
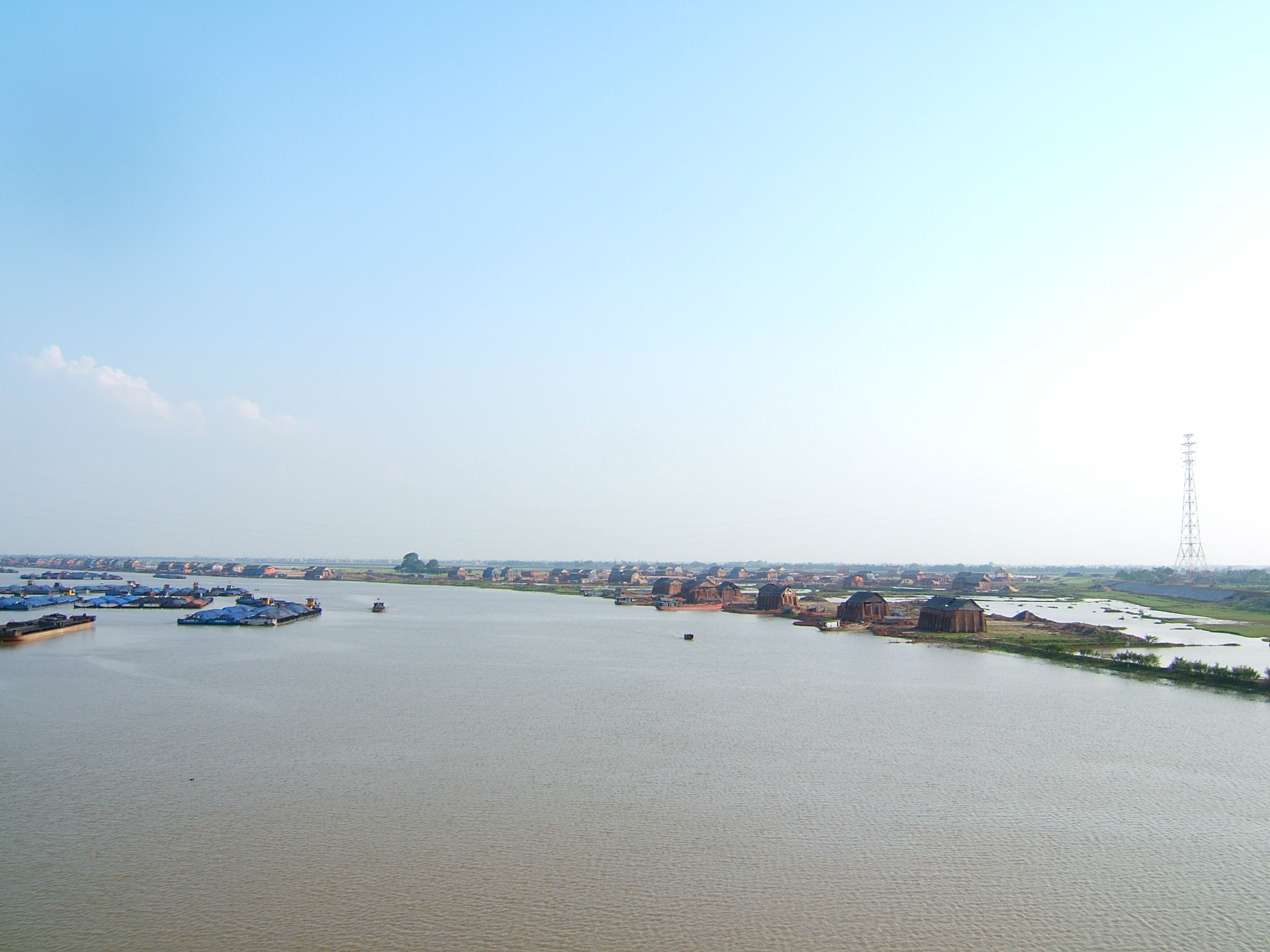
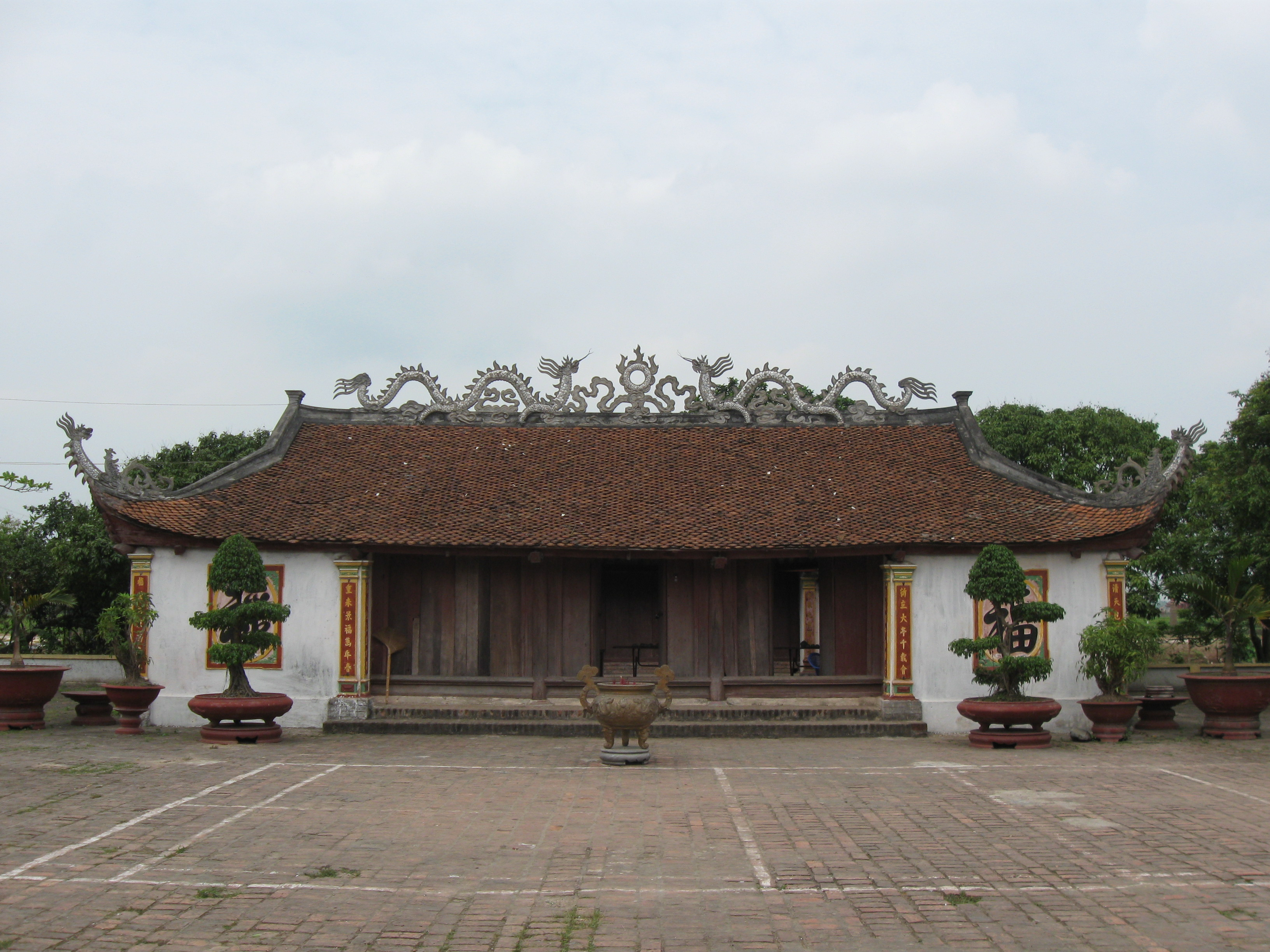
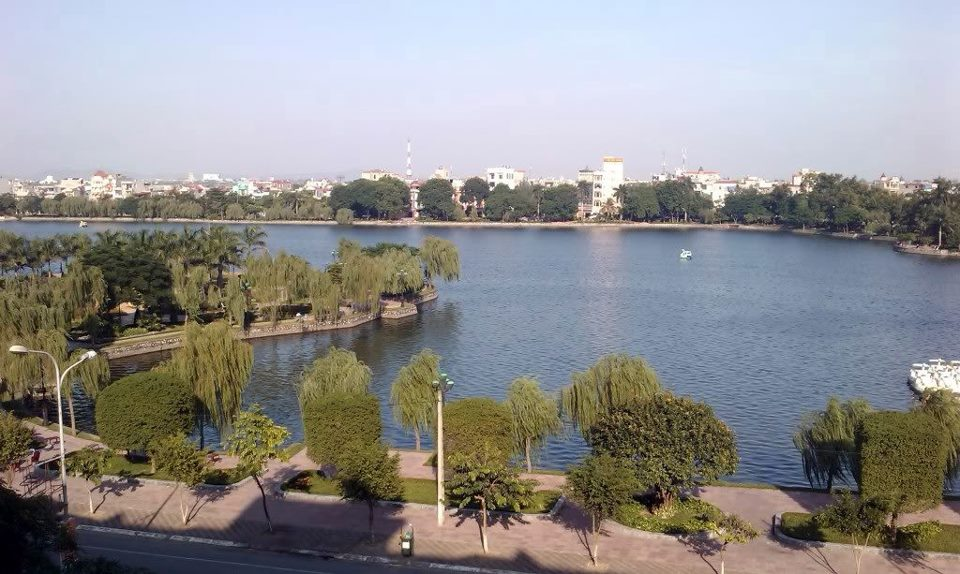
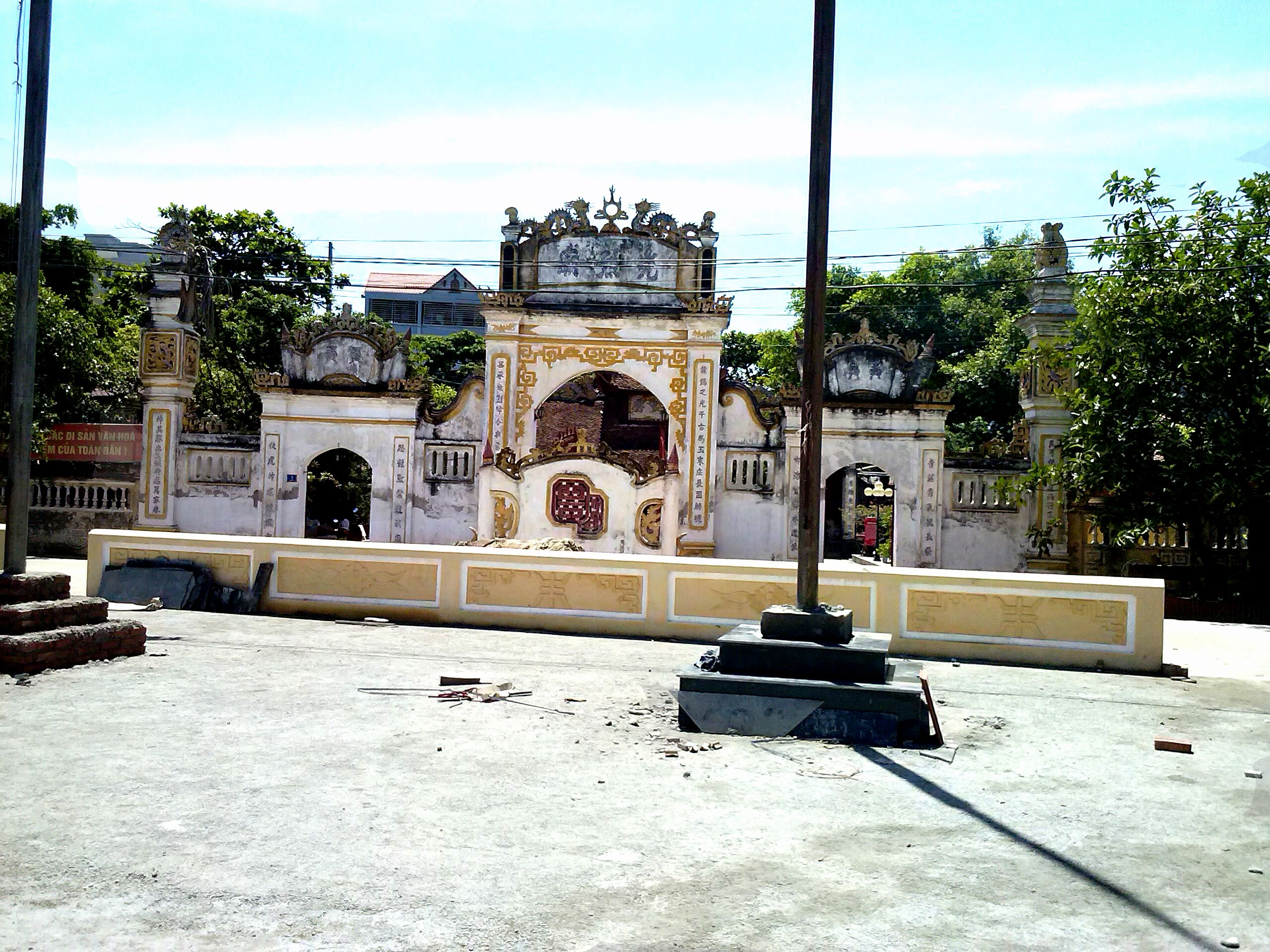
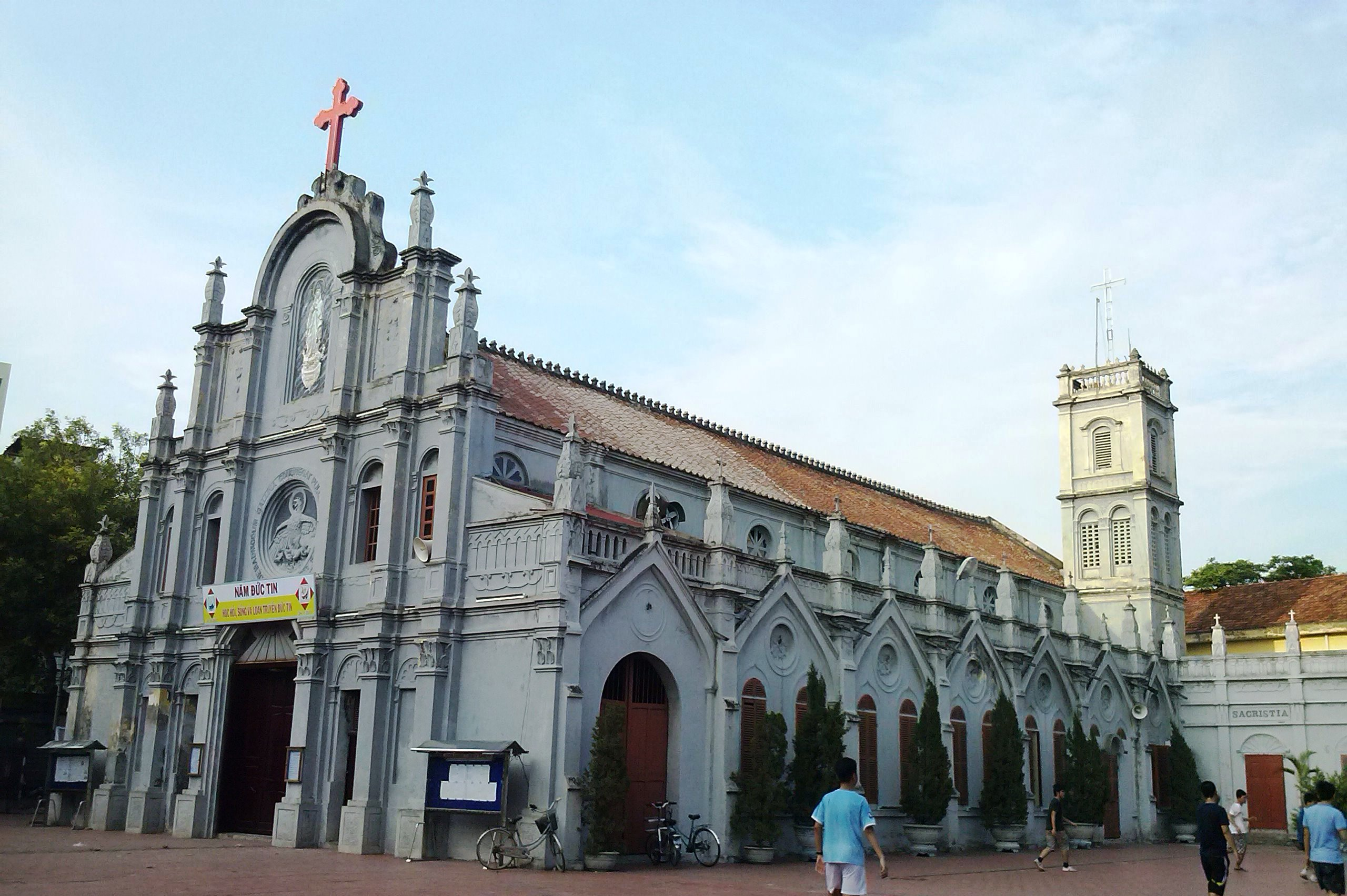
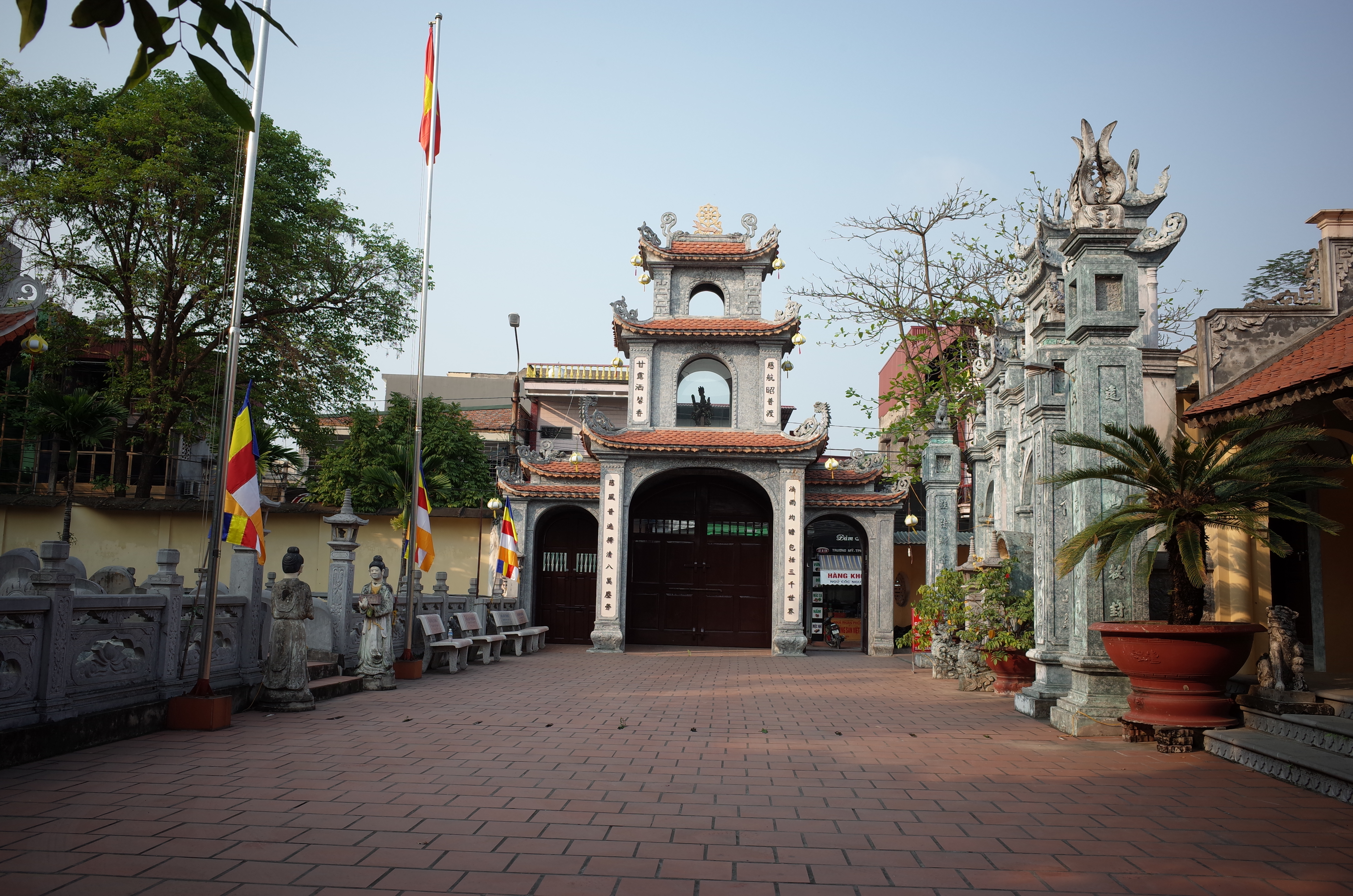
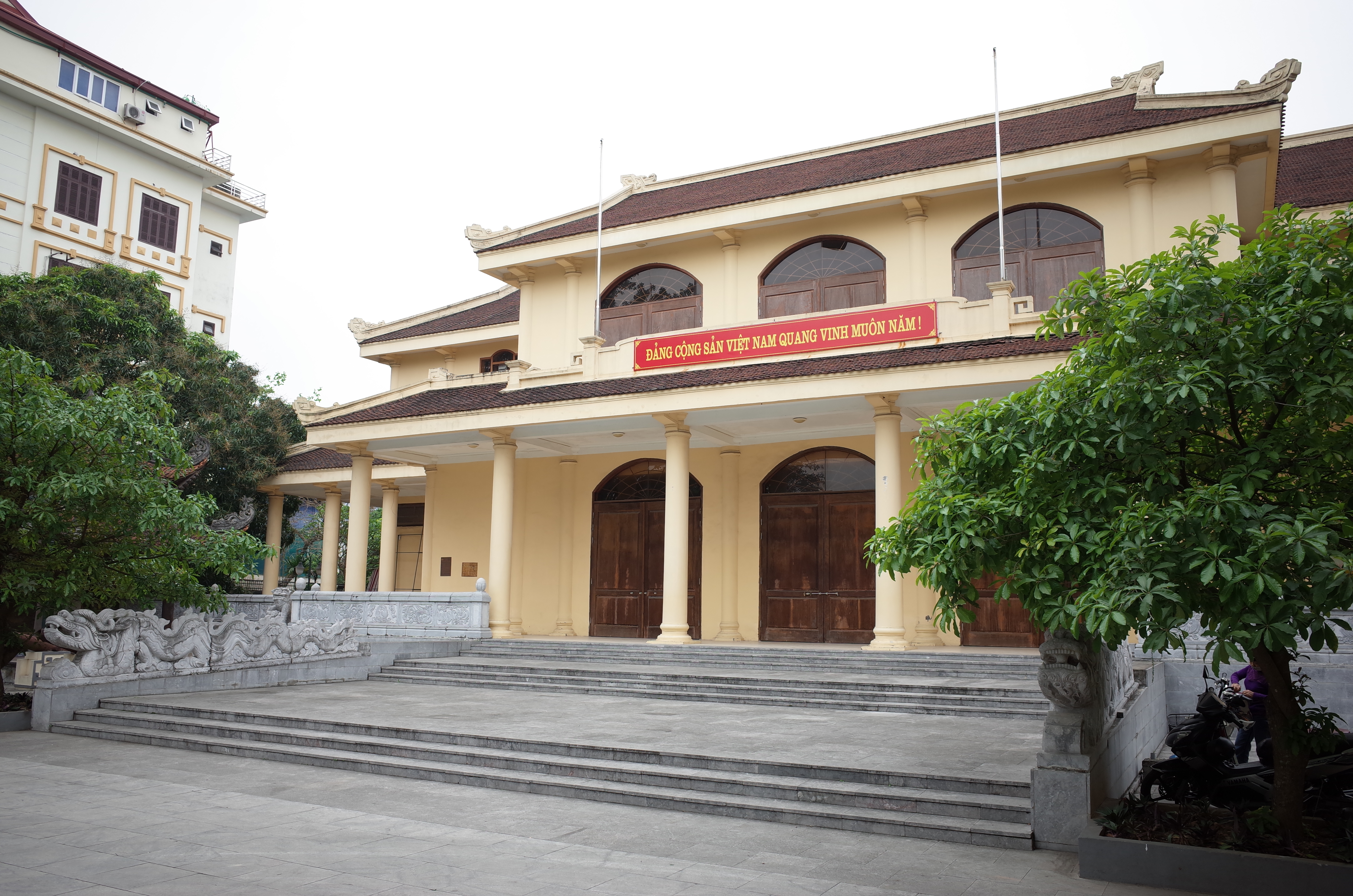
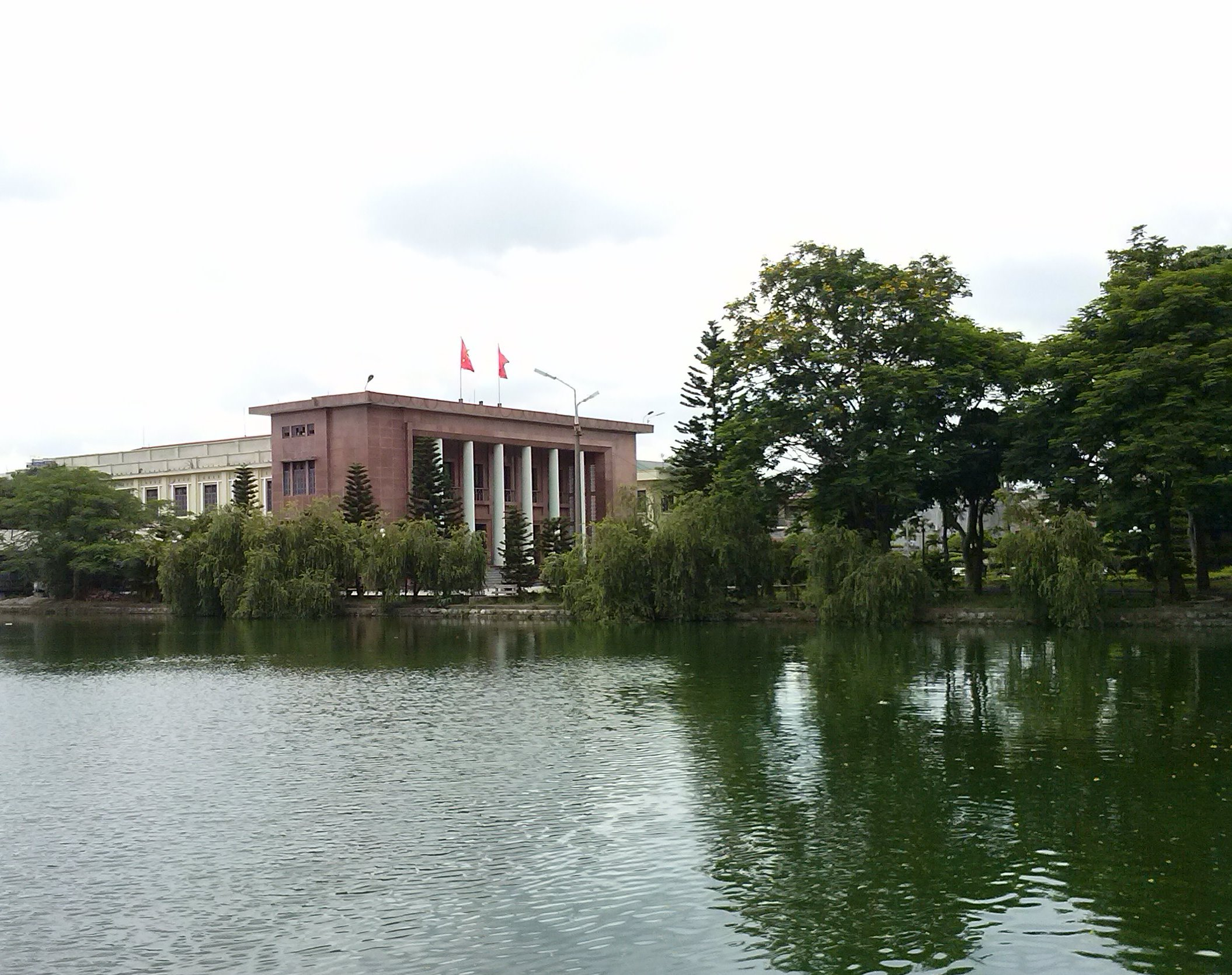
- From left to right: Lychee garden in Thanh Ha • Main street Trần Hưng Đạo • Mạc Đĩnh Chi Temple in Nam Sách District • Lục Đầu River flowing through Chí Linh City • Bạch Đằng River • Sượt Temple • Hải Dương Cathedral • Bảo Sái Temple • Hải Dương Museum • Hải Dương Theater

- Seal
- Nickname: Ocean sun
- Location of Hải Dương within Vietnam
- Coordinates: 20°55′N 106°20′E
- Country: Vietnam
- Region: Red River Delta
- Capital: Hải Dương

Government
  - People's Council Chair: Bùi Thanh Quyến

Area
  - Total: 1,668.28 km^{2} (644.13 sq mi)

Population (2025)
  - Total: 2,196,095
  - Density: 1,316.38/km^{2} (3,409.42/sq mi)

Demographics
  - Ethnicities: Vietnamese, Sán Dìu, Mường, Tày, Nùng, Hoa

GDP
  - Total: VND 109.200 trillion US$ 4.748 billion
- Time zone: UTC+7 (ICT)
- Area codes: 220
- ISO 3166 code: VN-61
- HDI (2020): ▲0.760 (12th)
- Website: vpubnd.haiduong.gov.vn www.haiduong.gov.vn

Hải Dương was a former province in the Red River Delta of northern Vietnam. Its name derives from the Sino-Vietnamese 海陽 phrase "ocean sun", though the modern province is in fact landlocked. Located in the Northern Key Economic Region, Hai Duong Province has a dynamic economy with a focus on industrial manufacturing.

On June 12, 2025, Hải Dương was incorporated into Haiphong.

== Name ==
Hải Dương is Sino-Vietnamese for "ocean sun" (海陽). The name first appeared officially in 1498. In feudal times, Hải Dương indicated a vast area from east of Hanoi to the South China Sea. The area corresponded to all of modern Hải Dương, Hải Phòng, most of Hưng Yên and the southwestern corner of Quảng Ninh.

== Geography ==
The province is located in the Red River Delta of north-eastern Vietnam, about mid-distance from Hanoi to Haiphong. Two famous pagodas, Côn Sơn and Kiếp Bạc, are situated in this province. The province is known for its lychees and for the traditional sweet bánh đậu xanh (mung bean paste).

Hải Dương is located in the center of North Vietnam. The natural area of the province is 1,668.28 km^{2} (644.13 mi^{2}), the 51st largest in Vietnam. Hải Dương province borders six provinces: Bắc Ninh, Bắc Giang and Quảng Ninh in the north; Hưng Yên in the west; Hải Phòng in the east; and Thái Bình to the south.

There are important roads and railways running through the province, including Highways No. 5, No. 18, No. 183, No. 37, and Hanoi–Haiphong Expressway.

== Administrative divisions ==
Hải Dương is subdivided into 12 district-level sub-divisions:

- 9 districts:
  - Bình Giang
  - Cẩm Giàng
  - Gia Lộc
  - Kim Thành
  - Nam Sách
  - Ninh Giang
  - Thanh Hà
  - Thanh Miện
  - Tứ Kỳ
- 1 district-level town:
  - Kinh Môn
- 2 provincial cities:
  - Chí Linh
  - Hải Dương (capital)

They are further subdivided into 13 commune-level towns (or townlets), 227 communes, and 25 wards.

== Climate ==
- Hải Dương has a tropical monsoon climate with typical cold winter, potential heat and high humidity. The prevailing winds come from the southeast and northeast. The climate is divided into four distinct seasons. From early February to early April, there is a transition period between the dry and wet seasons in which there is spray and rain. The rainy season lasts from April to October.
- The annual average rainfall is between 1,300 millimetres (51 in) and 1,700 millimetres (67 in).
- The average temperature 23.3 °C.
- The average amount of sunshine annually is 1,524 hours.
- The average relative humidity is between 85 and 87%.

== Population and demography ==
According to the Statistical Yearbook of Viet Nam 2021, Hải Dương has an area of 1,668.3 km^{2}, with a population of 1,936,800. The population density is 1,161 per/km^{2}.

- The average population by sex and by region is as follows:
  - By sex: Male: 966,500; female: 970,300
  - By region: Urban: 613,200; rural: 1,323,600
- The rate of population growth: 1.04%
- Number of people at working age: 939,900

Over the last 20 years, Hải Dương province has been experiencing a big change in its demographics. During this period, the rate of fertility decreased dramatically from a high rate at 6.7% to 2.14% between 2000 and 2008. The same pattern is found with the mortality rate. This is a result of the success of the family planning program and the improvement of the health care system in the province as well as innovations in medicine. In addition, life expectancy also increased over time. These changes have taken place at a speed that is much quicker than the world average rate and the rate of many other places in Asia.

The number of persons aged 60 years or older in Hải Dương province is estimated to be 600,000 in 2010. This number is projected to grow to nearly 800,000 by 2050, at which time it will be equal to the population of children under 15. This historic crossover of an increasing share of older persons and a declining share of children will mark the first time that the number of children and older persons are the same.

There are many ethnic groups of which the Kinh make up 99% of the population. Major religions include Buddhism, Catholicism and Protestantism of Christianity, Confucianism, Caodaism and the Hòa Hảo faith. With that being said, ancestor worship is probably the predominant "religion", although they may not realize it.

== History ==
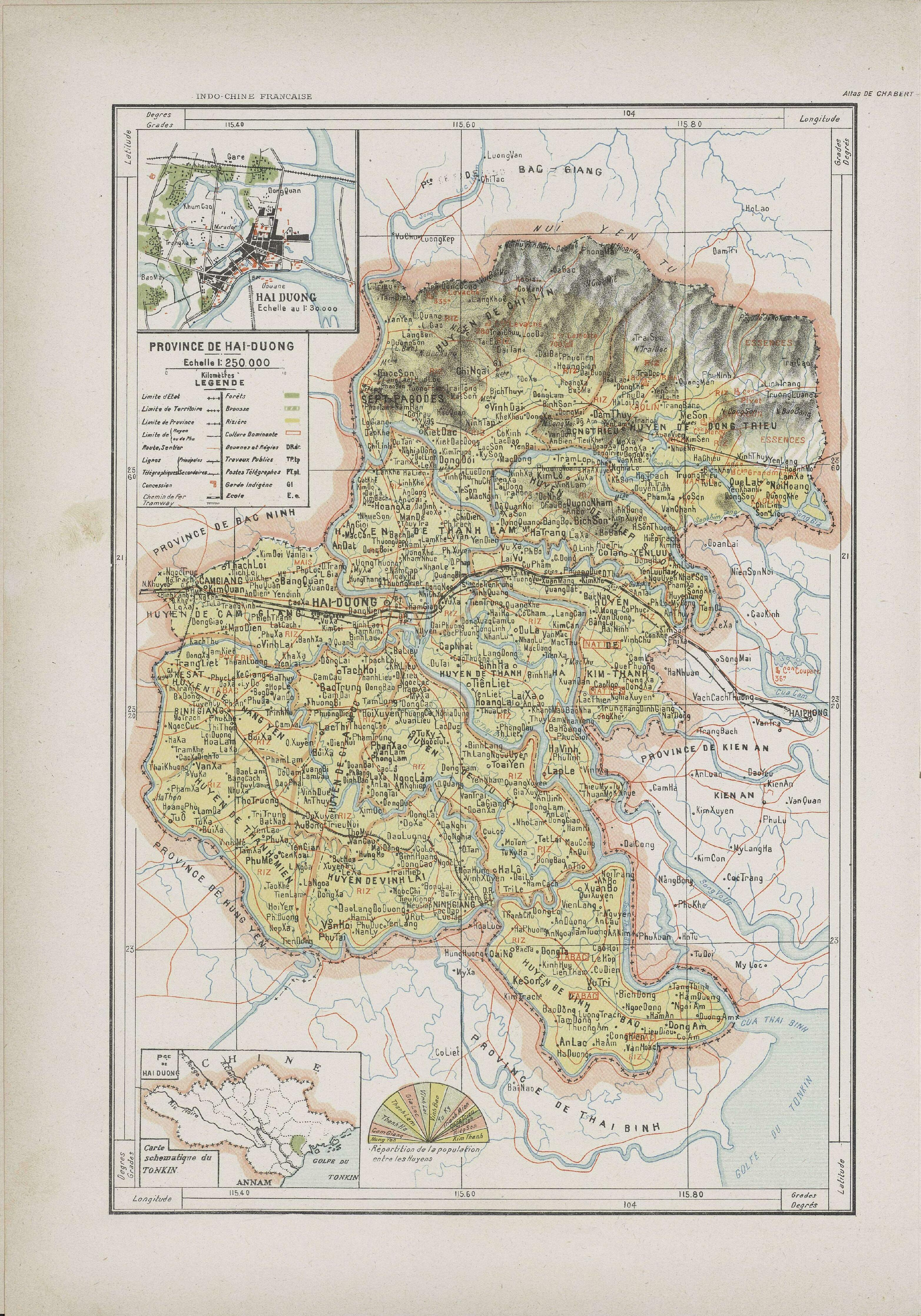
Map of Hai Duong province in 1909

- Hải Dương is located in the Red River Delta and originated from the civilization of the Red River. Hải Dương has had many name changes throughout history, such as Dương Tuyền (in the period of the Hùng kings), Giao Chỉ and Giao Châu (in the 1st millennium), Nam Sách Lo, Hồng Lo (under the Ly and Trần dynasties), Hồng Châu, Nam Sách (in the 16th century), Thừa tuyên and Hải Dương (in the 10th year of Quang Thuận's reign).
- Hải Dương province was established in 1831 and was first called "Thành Đông" (East Province) which means "the city to the east of Thăng Long citadel".
- In the early 20th century, the patriotic movement was expanded in Hải Dương.
- In the 1930s, the Hải Dương people carried out two resistance wars against the imperial French and American empires and then achieved victory after prolonged fighting.
- In 1968, Hải Dương was merged with Hưng Yên to become Hải Hưng Province.
- In January 1997, Hải Hưng was separated into Hải Dương and Hưng Yên.
- In August 1997, the government decided to upgrade Hải Dương from a town to city status. Since 1997, Hải Dương has had 11 districts and a city.
- On 12 June 2025, as part of major nationwide reforms, Hải Dương province was dissolved and merged with Haiphong.

== Economy ==
Located in the Northern Key Economic Region, Hai Duong Province has a dynamic economy with a focus on industrial manufacturing.

- Hải Dương province is located in the center of the Red River Delta, which has good conditions in transportation, agriculture and industrial production. Hải Dương province has an important role in the social economic development of the country. Its natural land area and sources are favorable for developing the economy. More than 800,000 of the 1.7 million people are employed, with over 500,000 employed in the agriculture industry. This is a benefit for the social and economic development of Hải Dương.
- Hải Dương has prioritized developing agriculture and industrial production. Hải Dương received domestic and international investment in over 50 industrial areas in the whole province. There are foreign business partners from places such as Britain, Germany, France and Hong Kong. Hải Dương also developed agriculture in the direction of economic, industrialization and modernization.
- For the past few years, Hải Dương has provided big cities such as Hanoi, Haiphong, and also consumers throughout Vietnam, with special produce such as lychee or traditional specialties such as green bean cake.
- In recent years, agriculture in Hải Dương has developed quickly and steadily.

On Vietnam's Provincial Competitiveness Index 2023, a key tool for evaluating the business environment in Vietnam’s provinces, Hai Duong received a score of 68.68. This was a slight improvement from 2022 in which the province received a score of 65.22. In 2023, the province received its highest scores on the 'Access To Land' and 'Law and Order’ criteria and lowest on 'Transparency' and ‘Business Support Policy’.

=== New urban areas ===
Presently Hải Dương City has two new urban areas. The first one is located in eastern Hải Dương, with an area of 108 ha and consists of two wards: Ngọc Châu and Hải Tân. The second is in western Hải Dương, and has an area of 433 ha. It is located in the territory of Thanh Bình ward and Tứ Minh commune. Both of the two new urban areas are invested by Nam Cuong Group. Currently there are many families living here but the cost of land and the cost of building the homes is quite high in comparison with living standard in Hải Dương. The two new urban area expanding Hải Dương City is one of main reasons Hải Dương City became a second level city on May 16, 2009.

== Education system ==
At present Hải Dương provincial education consists of:

- 1 Department of Education and Training
- 12 Offices of Education
- 13 Education Centers
- 12 Vocational Centers

There are a number of schools, listed by province and type:

District (city/town)	Preschools	Elementary schools	Junior high schools	Secondary schools	Colleges	Universities
Bình Giang	19	18	19	3		
Cẩm Giàng	19	21	20	3	1	
Chí Linh city	27	22	20	4	1	
Gia Lộc	25	25	26	3		
Hải Dương city	18	18	15	6	5	1
Kim Thành	22	24	21	4		
Kinh Môn town	27	27	27	5		
Nam Sách	25	24	25	5		
Ninh Giang	24	28	29	5		
Thanh Hà	25	25	26	4		
Thanh Miện	20	19	20	3		
Tứ Kỳ	29	29	27	4		

== Public health ==
Hải Dương was one of the first six provinces in Vietnam to construct a public safety program for children. A public safety site for children was constructed in Đức Chính village, Cẩm Giàng district. As the injury/accident rate amongst children had decreased significantly after only one year, this experimental trial project seems to have had a positive impact.

Hải Dương city has a public general hospital on Nguyễn Lương Bằng street.

== Transportation ==
In the 1990s the people of Hải Dương Province would have thought it inconceivable that their agricultural products could be readied for sale in Hanoi after only a few hours of transportation. Nowadays, however, it only takes about one hour to go to Hanoi from Hải Dương. This change is due to the development in the traffic network.

- In fact, transport in Hải Dương province developed very fast. During the last 5 years, the whole land transportation in Hải Dương was upgraded and improved with various projects. In 1999, the National Road No. 5 connecting Hanoi and Haiphong was upgraded to first-class status.
- Today, there are 649 km of roads under the central management including National Road Nos. 5, 18, 183 and 37 that have been completely built or upgraded. These roads are favorable for traveling and goods transportation within the Hải Dương province. Furthermore, there are 11 provincial asphalt land routes with a total length of 258 km and 27 land routes at district level with a total length of 352 km, of which 70% have been asphalt.
- Hải Dương has 10 waterways with a total length of nearly 300 km under the central management and six waterways with a total length of 140 km under local management. However, most of the transport operations on these waterways have not been planned yet.
- Hải Dương also has 70 km of railway (including 15 km of railways serving for the Phả Lại company)

== Media, culture, and entertainment ==
At present, Hải Dương has one provincial newspaper, publishing daily, weekend, and monthly editions. There are additional magazines published by different departments of the province in related fields. E-newspapers such as at www.haiduong.gov.vn and www.truyenhinhhaiduong.com.vn have made it easier to get information about the province than ever before.

Hải Dương Provincial People's Voice and Television Broadcasting Center is known as one of the most developed in the northern region. Cable TV networks have also been installed, providing customers with more than 40 international channels.

Hải Dương is known for hundreds of well-known historical, cultural relics and scenic areas such as Côn Sơn - Kiếp Bạc, Nguyễn Trãi Temple and Chi Lăng Nam Storks island. The province is also a place of many traditional handicraft villages with well-known products for centuries. Cultural festivals are organized annually during spring and autumn, attracting visitors from all over the nation.

Hải Dương had over 100 hotels ranging from 2 stars to 4 stars and many are motels or guest-houses. Restaurants serving traditional food can be found on almost every street in the city center, but visitors may also enjoy foreign cuisines at specialty restaurants around Bạch Đằng Lake.

=== Cuisine ===
Bánh đậu xanh, a sweet mung bean cake, and Rượu Phú Lộc are local specialties.
