= Gérard Gagnon =

Gérard Gagnon, Vietnamese name Nhân (fl. 1970s), is a Canadian Redemptorist priest formerly based in Da Lat, Vietnam. He worked on new Bible translations into Vietnamese, the Tâm Ngọc, following the work of the Alsatian priest Albert Schlicklin (Vietnamese name Cố Chính Linh).
