= Divers voyages et missions du père Alexandre de Rhodes =

1653 book by Alexandre de Rhodes

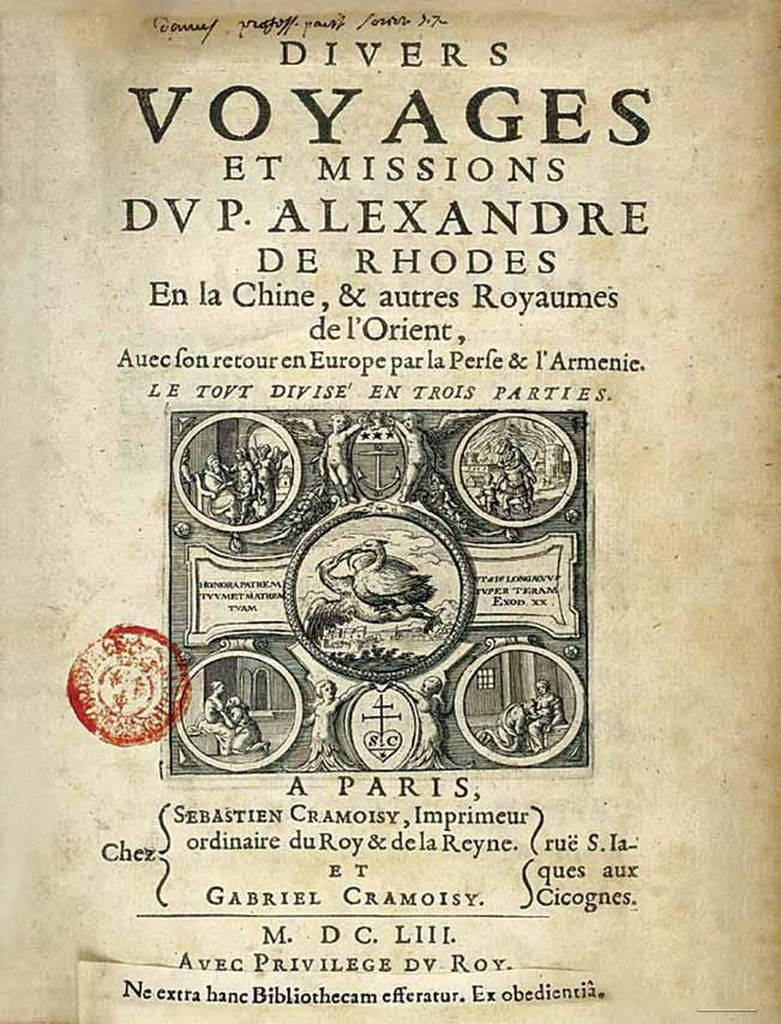
- Title page
- Author: Alexandre de Rhodes
- Language: French
- Subject: missionary work
- Publication date: 1653

Divers voyages et missions du père Alexandre de Rhodes de la Compagnie de Jésus en la Chine et autres royaumes de l'Orient, avec son retour en Europe par la Perse et l’Arménie is a travel book written by the Avignonese Jesuit Alexandre de Rhodes (1591-1660) which was published in 1653. In it, he narrates his voyage of 35 years and his missionary work.

During the 17th century, the limited European presence in Southeast Asia consisted of merchants and missionaries who traveled through the area. Most of the available travel texts about this region were produced by a relatively small number of merchants and missionaries. Alexandre wrote his own narrative with the stated purpose to convince Popes, Jesuit leaders, and Christian princes that additional bishops and missionaries were needed in Tonkin and Cochinchina. While Alexandre provides a relatively brief account about his travels through China, most of the book is devoted to his years of living in Tonkin and Cochinchina. He provides a detailed description of the local governments, armies, languages, customs, religions, and economic resources. He also emphasizes the political repression of the Christian minority by the local governments.

In retrospect, Alexandre's comments on the Vietnamese laws and customs tend to reveal his personal views about the European society of his era. . His description of the Vietnamese culture seems to be intentionally misleading. In order to provide a favorable view of the Vietnamese culture to his readers, the writer downplays controversial aspects, such as the practice of polygamy.

== Context ==
During Alexandre de Rhodes’s time, European presence in Southeast Asia was rather limited. Europeans were principally there to trade, but the merchants were often accompanied by missionaries. Therefore, most travel texts about Southeast Asia were produced by a relatively small number of merchants and missionaries. These texts were immensely popular during the seventeenth century, because Europeans were very curious about these foreign lands, their inhabitants and their customs.

Alexandre de Rhodes’s book was published when he was working in France (namely in Marseille, Lyon and Paris) between 1652 and 1654, in order to gain support for the Christian church in Vietnam. He was asked to fulfill the three following tasks: “to impress the Pope of the extreme need to send bishops to Tonkin and Cochinchina; to seek material help from Christian princes for the missions; and to ask the superior general to send more missionaries to the countries of Asia.” At the beginning of de Rhodes’s travel narrative, the Jesuit explains that the reason why he decided to write Divers Voyages [...], was because many great people who have read his short texts about his travels, have asked him to offer the public a full version.

== Contents ==
Divers voyages et missions du père Alexandre de Rhodes de la Compagnie de Jésus en la Chine et autres royaumes de l'Orient, avec son retour en Europe par la Perse et l’Arménie is divided in three parts: Alexandre de Rhodes’s journey from Rome to China, his missions in Tonkin and Cochinchina (today’s Vietnam) and finally his return from China to Rome. The main topic of this book is de Rhodes’s proselytizing work and his methods of conversion, but he does describe some of the foreign lands, customs, and politics as well.

The part about his journey in Tonkin and Cochinchina is the longest one, because he spent most of his time there. The first chapters describe Cochinchina’s and Tonkin’s historical relationship, governments, its armies, language, customs as well as its religions. De Rhodes also writes about their fertile lands, gold mines, high quantities of pepper, silk, sugar and other resources. After that, all the chapters on today’s Vietnam are mostly about his many successes and few failures in converting the natives, the government’s repression he and other Christians sometimes faced, and circumstances he portrayed as miracles. A recurring representation throughout the book is that of Vietnamese natives being highly receptive and devoted to Christianity, even risking their lives for their faith.

== Publication history ==
This travel account was first published in 1653 by the librarian and print worker Sébastien Cramoisy. It was republished in 1854 under the slightly different title: Les Voyages et Mission du P. Alexandre de Rhodes de la compagnie de Jésus en la Chine et autres Royaumes de l’Orient, by the publisher Julien, Lanier. The latter edition includes a foreword by the editor Auguste Carayon who belonged to the Society of Jesus, as well as some definitions of archaic words in the footnotes, no other alterations have been made.

== Contemporary reception ==
Alexandre de Rhodes’s Les Voyages et Mission du P. Alexandre de Rhodes de la compagnie de Jésus en la Chine et autres Royaumes de l’Orient has been examined in an essay by Micheline Lessard. She uses discourse analysis in order to examine a few passages in the book as well as other seventeenth- and eighteenth-century Jesuit texts about Vietnam. She contends that the texts she analyses are all Orientalist. Through this argument she challenges Edwards Said’s definition of Orientalism, because according to him it developed in the eighteenth century, and not before. Moreover, in her analysis of de Rhodes’s travel narrative, Lessard has found that when the Jesuit would describe Vietnamese laws and customs, his commentary was revealing of his opinions on European society. Furthermore, she shows that the Chinese Rites Controversy affected de Rhodes’s writing as well. Due to the sensitive political climate created by the controversy, Jesuits felt the need to portray the Vietnamese in a more positive light. Alexandre de Rhodes did so by purposefully downplaying the practice of polygamy in Vietnam for instance. Finally, her comparison has shown, that de Rhodes’s representations slightly differed from the ones made by the other Jesuits. For instance, although he described Vietnamese religious customs as superstitious, he was still able to offer “a more descriptive and analytical account”.

Michael Harrigan also briefly dealt with Alexandre de Rhodes’s travel book. He included the latter in his book, where he investigates how French travel narratives represented the Orient in the seventeenth century. In the chapter about the East Indies, he identifies a few tropes which were often found in the travel accounts he analyzed (Divers Voyages [...] is among them). Similarly to Lessard, Harrigan argues that these texts have Orientalist characteristics.

== Bibliography ==
- Harrigan, M. (2008). Veiled Encounters: Representing the Orient in 17th-Century French Travel literature. Amsterdam: Rodopi.
- Lessard, M. (2018). Curious Relations: Jesuit Perceptions of the Vietnamese. In K. W. Taylor & J. K. Whitmore (Eds.), Essays into Vietnamese Pasts (pp.137-156). Cornell University Press.
- Phan, P. C., & Rhodes, A. de. (2005). Mission and Catechesis: Alexandre de Rhodes and Inculturation in Seventeenth-Century Vietnam. Maryknoll, NY: Orbis Books.
- Rhodes, A. de. (1854). Les Voyages et Mission du P. Alexandre de Rhodes de la compagnie de Jésus en la Chine et autres Royaumes de l’Orient (A. Carayon, Ed.). Julien Lanier. (Original work published 1653)
- Rhodes, A. de. (1966). Rhodes of Viet Nam: The Travels and Missions of Father Alexander de Rhodes in China and Other Kingdoms of the Orient. Westminster, MD: The Newman Press. Solange Hertz, ed.
