= Nguyễn Hồng Quang =

Nguyễn Hồng Quang is the Vietnamese pastor and lawyer, general secretary and vice-president of the Mennonite Church in Vietnam, chairman of the Legal Committee of the Vietnam Evangelical Fellowship.

Quang is known for his human rights activities in defence of Vietnamese montagnards, peasants, Christian religious groups and politically persecuted.

Several times pastor Quang (sometimes with his wife and church members) was arrested by Vietnamese authorities, often suffered from intimidation and threats.

Before his last arrest in 2004, he sent a message to a friend alluding to his concerns, "The Church is now on stormy seas but the boat still goes out. The Lord enables us to row together. Be at peace. I ask you and the Church to pray for us."

In July 2005, controlled by Vietnamese government police forces destroyed the home of the pastor in Ho Chi Minh City (former Saigon), while he was in detention, including the room where his congregation held worship services.

Mennonite movement (together with Baptist one) was officially recognized by Hanoi in October, 2007, which was estimated as some improvement of religious freedom in the country. Pastor Nguyen Quang Trung, provisional president of the Vietnam Mennonite Church, taking part in the official ceremony of the above authorisation, quoted his Church’s motto: "Living the Gospel, worshipping God, and serving the nation."

According to "Canadian Mennonite Magazine", in December, 2011, eleven days before Christmas, local authorities in District Two of Ho Chi Minh City once more ruined the home of Quang and his wife. The building also served as a training centre and headquarters for the unregistered Vietnam Mennonite Church (distinct from the officially registered Vietnam Mennonite Church).

== See also ==
- Mennonite Church in Vietnam
