= Lê Thị Hồng Liên =

Vietnamese activist

Lê Thị Hồng Liên is a Christian teacher from Vietnam. She taught for the Mennonite Church in Vietnam. She was arrested in June 2004 along with other members of her church.

She was released from Bien Hoa Mental Hospital on April 28, 2005.
