= Pierre Widmer =

French Mennonite pastor and editor

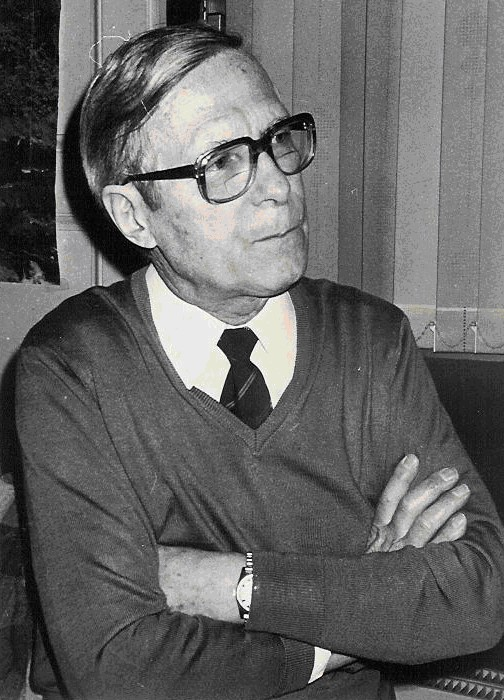
Pierre Widmer circa 1980

Pierre Widmer (1912–1999) was a French Mennonite pastor, editor of the journal Christ Seul.

== Early life ==
Born in Brognard, France, in the department of Doubs near Montbéliard, Pierre Widmer was raised in a Mennonite family. Widmer attended the Mennonite church at Montbéliard as a young man and was baptised there. He attended the École Normale in Besançon, where he developed a love for poetry.

In 1936, Widmer married Hélène Sommer, the daughter of Pierre Sommer, a man of great enthusiasm for the Mennonite church. He was the best known itinerant French Mennonite preacher responsible for the first French Mennonite conferences, founder and editor of the journal Christ Seul (Christ Alone).

In Widmer's youth, the Mennonites were a small community in France (about 4,000 people) living in isolated rural communities in Alsace, Lorraine and the Pays de Montbéliard. They were the descendants of the Swiss Anabaptist communities which fled to France during the 16th century Reformation.

== War service ==
Unlike North American Mennonites, who emigrated in the 18th century, French Mennonites had largely abandoned the principle of non-resistance or pacifism. It was not unusual then that Widmer enrolled in the Ecole des Sous-Officiers, a military academy at Saint Maixent.

Afterwards, he became a primary school teacher near Montbéliard but remained in the Army reserves. When France declared war on Germany in September 1939, Widmer was recalled up to the Army. He was serving on the front along the Rhine when Germany invaded France in June 1940. His unit was beaten back to the Vosges mountains. Widmer was taken prisoner by the Germans at Masevaux in the Haut Rhin.

== POW ==
Widmer spent five years in three different German prison camps for French officers. During that time, he was apparently treated well since French officers enjoyed better conditions than captured enlisted men. However, the experience of the war and captivity deeply marked Widmer. He devoted himself to caring for the spiritual needs of his comrades, serving as a de facto camp chaplain. In this role, he came to meet and appreciate the convictions of Lutheran, Reformed, Darbyist, Evangelical and even Catholic prisoners. Widmer also became convinced of the futility of war, even a patriotic or "just war". This change in his position about violence is clear in the poems that Widmer wrote during captivity, published in 1987 as Ombres et Lumières or "Shadows and Light". Upon his release from the prison camp at the end of the war, Widmer was awarded the Croix de Guerre and a Citation à l'Armée pour Actes de Bravoure.

== Post-war Mennonite tensions ==
When Widmer returned to his home in Montbéliard in May 1945 at the end of the war, he found a French Mennonite community in upheaval. The experience of the war had exacerbated tensions between Alsatian and French-speaking Mennonite communities. The fighting had destroyed many Mennonite farms. The Mennonite community was increasingly aged and isolated. Widmer was regarded by many Mennonites with great respect because of having endured the long captivity, for his relative youth (33 years), and because he was the natural successor of church leader Pierre Sommer, his father-in-law. Widmer is elected Ancien or elder of the Montbéliard church in 1945. When Widmer took the floor at the Synode of Mennonite churches in May 1946, he called for greater unity among the Mennonite communities and a greater focus on activities for youth. His proposals were not unanimously appreciated. The Alsatian Mennonites decided at their conference at Pfastatt a few weeks later to turn down Widmer's proposal for a single French Mennonite association of churches. Fearing a loss of tradition, Hans Nussbaumer, elder of the Mennonite church at Altkirch, spoke out against Widmer's activities with youth. But the Synode did appoint Widmer to replace the aging Pierre Sommer as editor of Christ Seul, a position he would hold for 38 years. Widmer also won approval for his offer to become a full-time itinerant pastor in 1948.

== Links to the United States ==
Widmer was instrumental in renewing ties with American Mennonites, and in bringing an ecclesiology to French Mennonites that was regarded by many as being particularly American. Widmer represented French Mennonites at the Mennonite World Conference in Goshen, Indiana, in 1948. During his stay in the United States, Widmer was impressed by the level of organization in the American churches, including youth activities and Sunday schools. He was also deeply influenced by the American Mennonite commitment to pacifism. American Mennonites such as Harold Bender, Guy Hershberger and Orie Miller wrote and spoke out on the topic of non-resistance and peacemaking. Bender's 1942 article "The Anabaptist Vision" posits that the Mennonites should return to the faith of the 16th century Anabaptists, characterized by non-conformity to the world, complete love and service to one's neighbors, and a rejection of all forms of violence. John H. Yoder, a disciple of Bender from Goshen, came to France to work with the Mennonite Central Committee in the 1950s. He and Widmer collaborated on many projects, including a translation into French of The Anabaptist Vision, and the creation of a children's home at Valdoie, near Belfort. Widmer was also instrumental in creating American-style Sunday school classes for children at many French Mennonite churches. He organized the first summer camps for children at Laxou near Nancy.

Widmer was the motor behind the creation of many French Mennonite associations. He was the co-founder and president of the Comité Missionaire Mennonite Française (French Mennonite Missions Committee) which supported missionaries abroad, co-founder and president of La Mission Mennonite Française (collaborated with the MCC to support evangelisation and relief efforts in post-war France), co-founder and first professor of the Mennonite Biblical Institute in Basel, Switzerland, co-founder of the Evangelical seminary at Vaux-sur-Seine, co-founder and president of the Entente Évangelique du Pays de Montbéliard, among others.

In 1962, Widmer's wife Hélène died of cancer. Widmer remarried two years later to Christianne Buy, the widow of Robert Gaudry, the director of the children's home at Valdoie that Widmer had helped to create.

== Later work ==
With the mouthpiece of the journal Christ Seul, Widmer brought articles about peace and social justice into the homes of thousands of French Mennonites. Widmer published Pages Choisies de Pierre Sommer (selected writings of Pierre Sommer) upon his father-in-law's death in 1952, in which he emphasizes Sommer's commitment to peace. Widmer was part of a committee of French Mennonites which, with the help of General Neyhauser, unsuccessfully petitioned successive French governments from 1949 onward to allow the creation of civic service as an alternative to obligatory military service. He also fostered an opening of the French Mennonite church to other denominations. He was the elder member of the Mennonite committee to the Lutheran-Mennonite dialogues of 1981-84. He did not hesitate to propose joint activities with other churches, such as the creation of the Evangelical Seminary at Vaux-sur-Seine.

But Widmer was also conscious of preserving a distinctive Mennonite identity, even as the church embraced fellow Christians. His book Ce que croient les Mennonites (What Mennonites Believe), published in 1981 during the Lutheran-Mennonite dialogues, is an affirmation of the core beliefs of the church, including a commitment to peace and service. Widmer also wrote Il y a des gens qui vous troublent (There are those that trouble you) in 1984 in which he defended traditional Mennonite beliefs against the influences of Pentecostal and charismatic movements.

== Retirement ==
Widmer retired from his work at Christ Seul in 1984, turning his editors desk over to his son-in-law from his second marriage, Pierre Lugbull. In 1993 his second wife Christianne Buy died. As his health deteriorated, Widmer withdrew as Ancien from the Montbéliard church in 1997. He died in Montbéliard in 1999 at the age of 87.
