= Alexandre de Rhodes =

Jesuit missionary and lexicographer in Vietnam

The Reverend Alexandre de Rhodes SJ
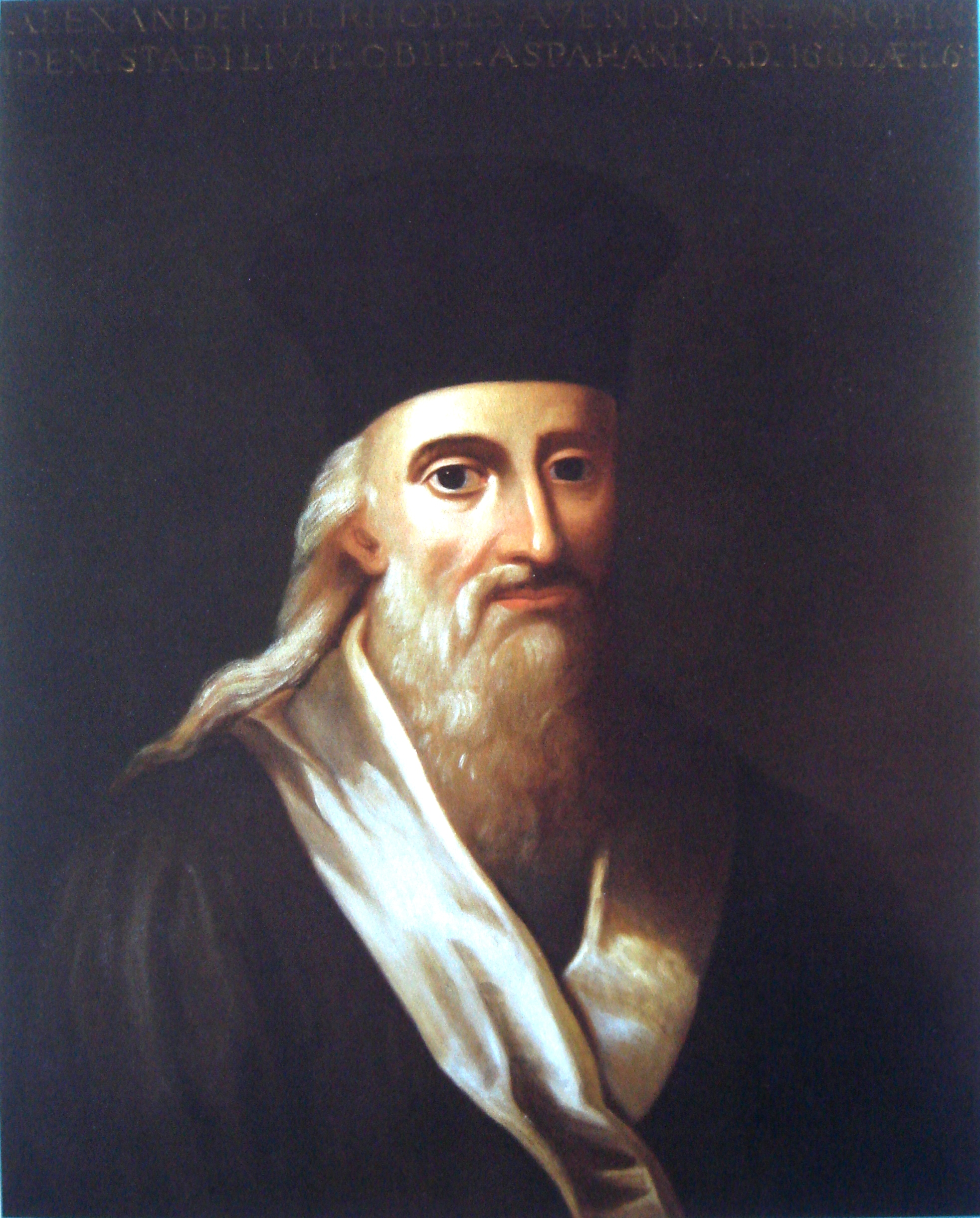

Personal life
- Born: 15 March 1593 Avignon, Papal States
- Died: 5 November 1660 (aged 67) Isfahan, Persia

Religious life
- Denomination: Roman Catholicism

Alexandre de Rhodes, SJ (French pronunciation: [alɛksɑ̃dʁ də ʁɔd]; 15 March 1593 – 5 November 1660), also Đắc Lộ, was an Avignonese Jesuit missionary and lexicographer who had a lasting impact on Christianity in Vietnam. He wrote the Dictionarium Annamiticum Lusitanum et Latinum, the first trilingual Vietnamese-Portuguese-Latin dictionary, published in Rome, in 1651.

== Biography ==
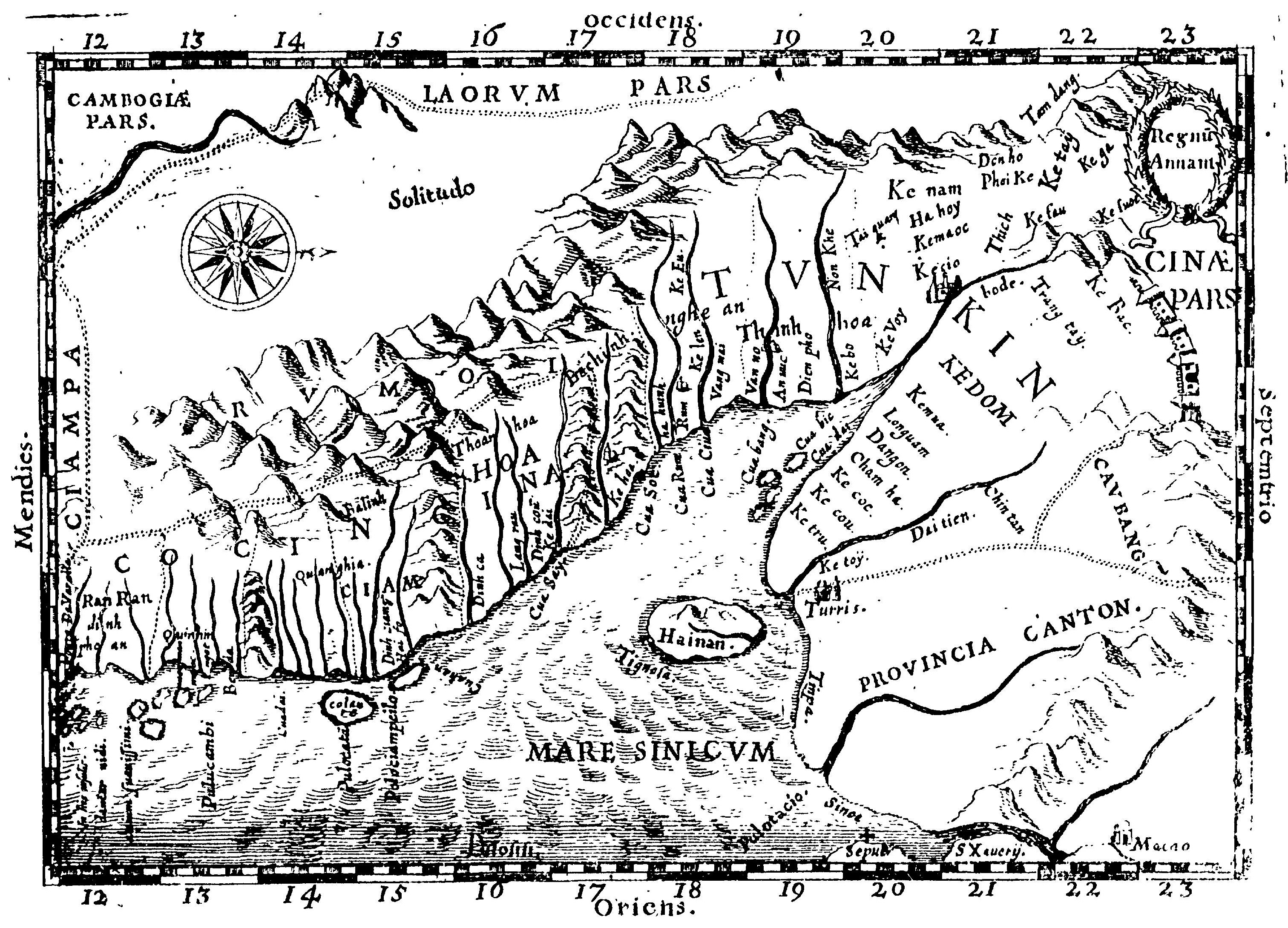
Map of "Annam" drafted by Alexandre de Rhodes (1651) showing "Cocincina" (left) and "Tunkin" (right).

Alexandre de Rhodes was born in Avignon, Papal States (now in France). According to some sources, he was of Jewish origin. His paternal side was from Aragón, Spain. He entered the novitiate of the Society of Jesus in Rome on 24 April 1612 to dedicate his life to missionary work.

In 1624, he arrived at the Nguyễn-controlled domain of Đàng Trong (known to the Europeans as Cochinchina) on a boat with fellow Jesuit Girolamo Maiorica. De Rhodes studied Vietnamese under Francisco de Pina before returning to Portuguese Macau.

Following the successful visit of fellow Jesuits Giuliano Baldinotti and Julio Koga to Đàng Ngoài (known to the Europeans as Tonkin) in 1626, his superior André Palmeiro sent Alexandre de Rhodes and Pero Marques Sr to evangelize the region, within North Vietnam. The two missionaries landed in Thanh Hoá on 19 March 1627 (the Feast of Saint Joseph) and arrived to the capital Thăng Long (nowadays Hanoi) on 2 July (the Feast of Visitation). De Rhodes worked there until 1630, when he was forced to leave. During these three years he was in and around the court at Hanoi during the rule of lord Trịnh Tráng, where he captivated the emperor with gifts such as an intricate clock and a glided volume on mathematics. It was during that time that he composed the Ngắm Mùa Chay, a popular Catholic devotion to this day, meditating upon the Passion of Christ in the Vietnamese language. He was expelled from Northern Vietnam in 1630 as Trịnh Tráng became concerned about him being a spy for the Nguyen clan. Rhodes in his reports said he converted more than 6,000 Vietnamese. Daily conversation in Vietnam "resembles the singing of birds", wrote Alexandre de Rhodes.

From Đàng Ngoài Rhodes went to Macau, where he spent ten years. He then returned to Vietnam, this time to Đàng Trong, mainly around Huế. He spent six years in this part until he aroused the displeasure of lord Nguyễn Phúc Lan and was condemned to death.

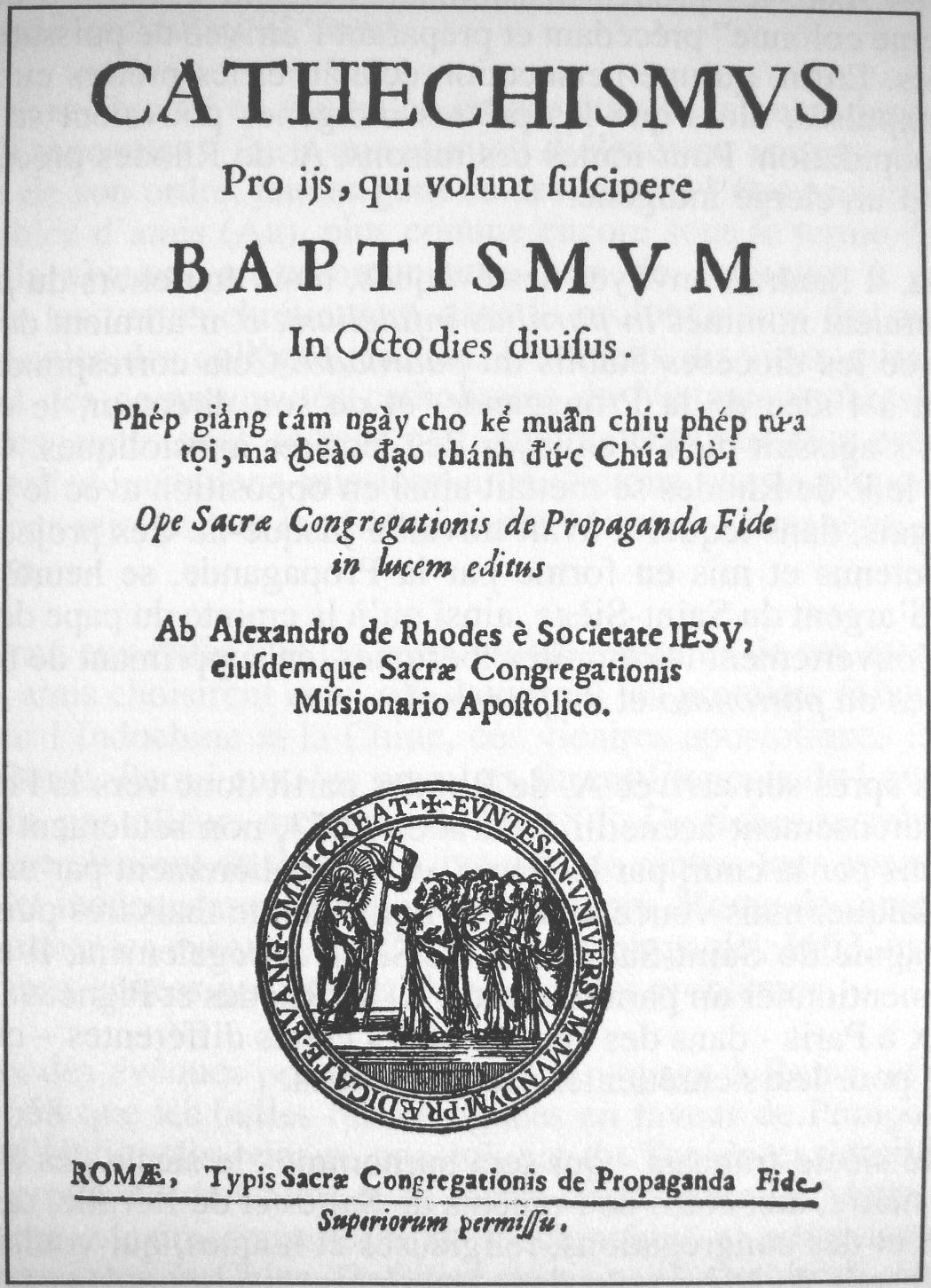
Latin-Vietnamese catechism, written by Alexandre de Rhodes.

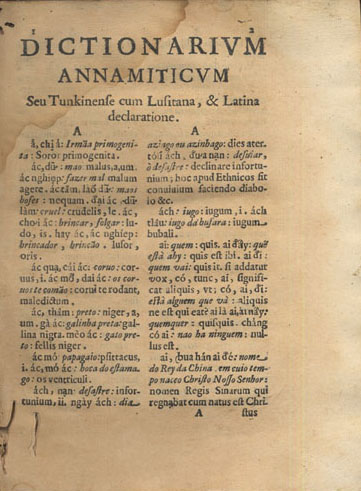
A page from Alexandre de Rhodes' 1651 dictionary, Dictionarium Annamiticum Lusitanum et Latinum.

As his sentence was reduced to exile, Rhodes returned to Rome by 1649 and pleaded for increased funding for Catholic missions to Vietnam, telling somewhat exaggerated stories about the natural riches to be found in Vietnam. This plea by Alexandre de Rhodes helped to found the Paris Foreign Missions Society in 1659. As neither the Portuguese nor the Pope showed interest in the project, Alexandre de Rhodes, with Pope Alexander VII's agreement, found secular volunteers in Paris in the persons of François Pallu and Pierre Lambert de la Motte, the first members of the Paris Foreign Missions Society, who were sent to the Far-East as Apostolic vicars.

Alexandre de Rhodes himself was sent to Persia instead of back to Vietnam. Rhodes died in Isfahan, Persia, in 1660 and was buried in the New Julfa Armenian Cemetery.

== Works ==
While in Vietnam, de Rhodes developed an early Vietnamese alphabet based on work by earlier Portuguese missionaries such as Gaspar do Amaral, António Barbosa and Francisco de Pina. De Rhodes compiled a catechism, "Catechismus pro ijs, qui volunt suscipere baptismum in octo dies divisis", and a trilingual dictionary and grammar, Dictionarium Annamiticum Lusitanum et Latinum. Both published in Rome in 1651, de Rhodes's works reflect his favor of this new Latin-script alphabet instead of Nôm script. Later refined as chữ Quốc ngữ, it eventually became the de facto written form of Vietnamese language in the 20th century. Meanwhile, Maiorica's catechism and devotional texts reflect the favor of chữ Nôm, which was the dominant script of Vietnamese Christian literature until the 20th century.

De Rhodes also wrote several books about Vietnam and his travels there, including:

- Relazione de’ felici successi della santa fede predicata dai Padri della Compagnia di Giesu nel regno di Tunchino (Rome, 1650)
- Tunchinesis historiae libri duo, quorum altero status temporalis hujus regni, altero mirabiles evangelicae predicationis progressus referuntur: Coepta per Patres Societatis Iesu, ab anno 1627, ad annum 1646 (Lyon, 1652)
  - Histoire du Royaume de Tunquin, et des grands progrès que la prédication de L’Évangile y a faits en la conversion des infidèles Depuis l’année 1627, jusques à l’année 1646 (Lyon, 1651), translated by Henri Albi
- Divers voyages et missions du P. Alexandre de Rhodes en la Chine et autres royaumes de l'Orient (Paris, 1653), translated into English as Rhodes of Viet Nam: The Travels and Missions of Father Alexandre de Rhodes in China and Other Kingdoms of the Orient (1666) and published in a modern English translation by Solange Hertz as Rhodes of Viet Nam: The Travels and Missions of Father Alexander de Rhodes in China and Other Kingdoms of the Orient (1966).
- La glorieuse mort d'André, Catéchiste (The Glorious Death of Andrew, Catechist) (pub. 1653)

== Commemoration ==
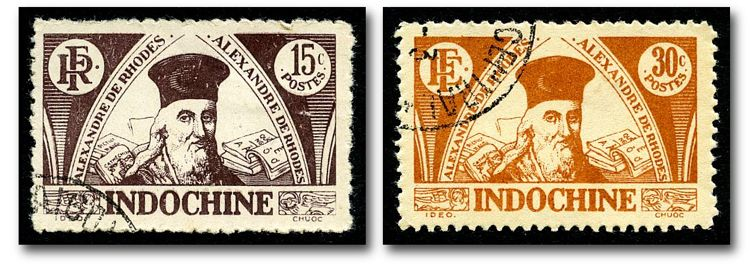
Two postage stamps of French Indochina with denominations of 15 and 30 centimes, issued in 1943 in recognition of Alexandre de Rhodes' contribution to the development of the latin-based Vietnamese script.

In 1943, French Indochina issued two postage stamps with denominations of 15 and 30 centimes in recognition of his contributions to the development of the chữ Quốc ngữ script. The Republic of Vietnam later issued a series of four commemorative postage stamps marking the 300th anniversary of his death, though released a year behind schedule, on November 5, 1961.

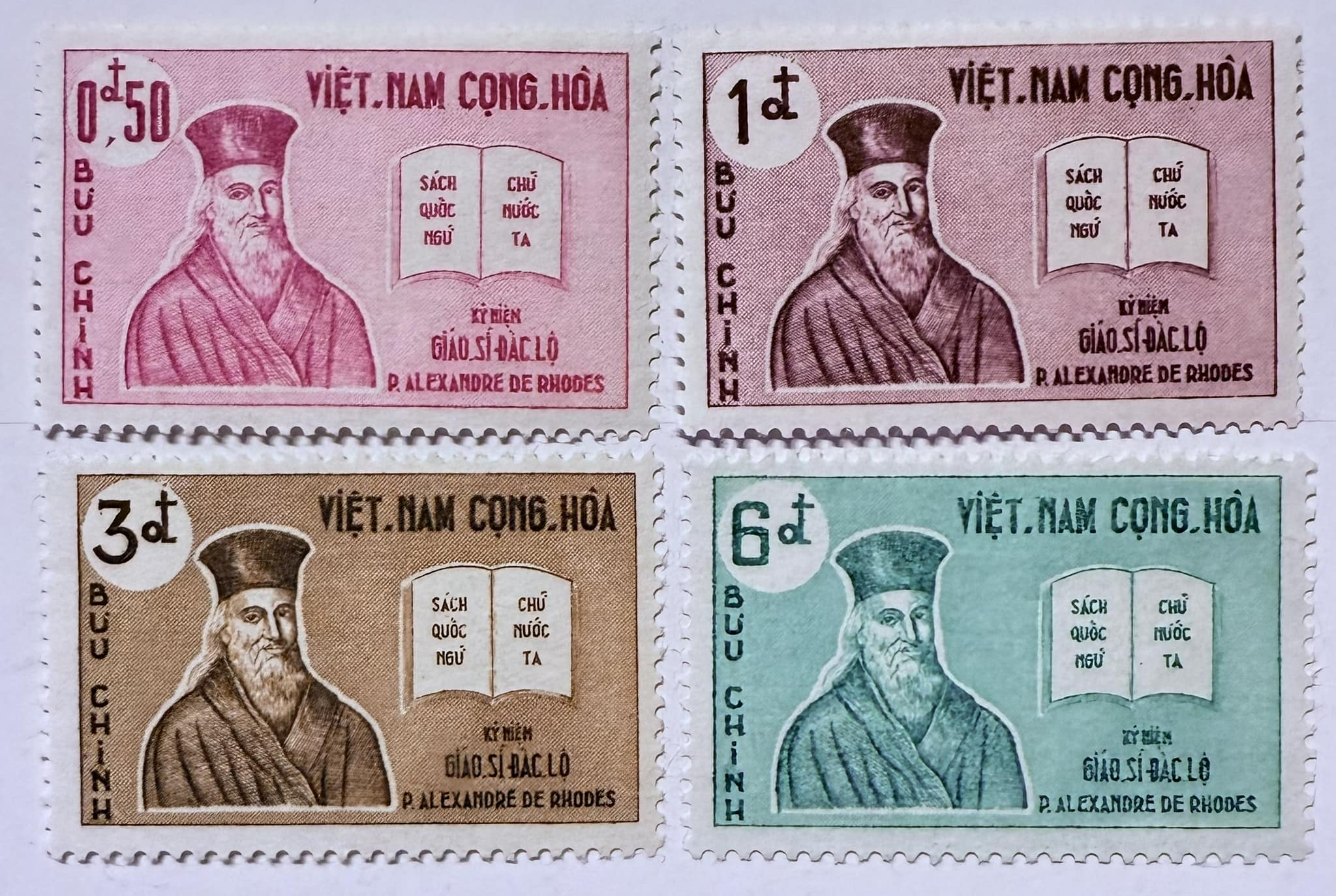
A series of four postage stamps of the Republic of Vietnam, issued in 1961 for the 300th anniversary of the death of Alexandre de Rhodes (1591–1660)

In March 2001, to mark the 350th anniversary of the Dictionarium Annamiticum Lusitanum et Latinum, Vietnamese painter and nuclear physicist Nguyen Dinh Dang (born 1958) created the painting The Introduction of Roman Writing Into Vietnam (The Transcendental Death of Mr. Nguyễn Văn Vĩnh), dedicated to Alexandre de Rhodes and Vietnamese intellectual Nguyen Van Vinh (1882–1936) — a journalist and translator of Western literature who was among the foremost advocates of the Latin-based Vietnamese script in early 20th-century Vietnam.

== Sources ==
- Tigers in the Rice, W. Sheldon p. 26 (1969)
- Catholic Encyclopedia entry on Alexandre de Rhodes
- Trần Duy Nhiên and Roland Jacques (2007). "Phản hồi bài viết của Gs Ts Phạm Văn Hường". Archived from the original.
- Nguyễn Đình Đầu (2007). "Về bài báo vu khống và phỉ báng cha Ðắc Lộ". Nguyệt san Công giáo và Dân tộc số 145.
- Antôn Bùi Kim Phong (2017). "Alexandre de Rhodes S.J. Nhà truyền giáo".
- Klaus Schatz (2015). "... Dass diese Mission eine der blühendsten des Ostens werde ...". P. Alexander de Rhodes (1593–1660) und die frühe Jesuitenmission in Vietnam [‘... For this mission to become one of the most flourishing in the East ...’: Father Alexander de Rhodes (1593–1660) and early Jesuit mission in Vietnam]. Münster: Aschendorff, ISBN 978-3-402-13100-8.
