= Protestantism in Vietnam =

Protestants in Vietnam (Vietnamese: đạo Tin Lành lit. 'Evangelicalism') are a religious minority, constituting 1% of the population in 2022. Though its numbers are small, Protestantism is the country's fastest-growing religion, growing at a rate of 600% in the early 2000s.

== Origin ==
Protestantism was introduced in 1911 at Đà Nẵng by a Canadian missionary named Robert A. Jaffray. As part of the Christian and Missionary Alliance, over 100 missionaries were sent to Vietnam, assisting the faith's growth in the country. During the French colonization, Protestantism was not encouraged; however, it started to spread slowly. By 1928, thirty pastors were authorized to operate in the country by the French local government. Later on, the first Protestant organization recognized by the Vietnamese government was the Evangelical Church of Vietnam: North in 1963.

By 1967 information, Protestant communities were represented mainly within South Vietnam. Those communities included the French Reformed Church, Anglican–Episcopalian, Christian and Missionary Alliance, Baptists, Churches of Christ, Worldwide Evangelization Crusade, and Seventh-day Adventists. Other Protestant associations were also represented in some social services and welfare agencies. In 1967 there were 150,000 Protestant adherents in South Vietnam, representing about 1% of the total population.

Several Protestant church properties were confiscated during the communist takeover of South Vietnam in 1975, including the seminaries in Nha Trang and Hanoi. Hundreds of Protestant churches were also destroyed in this period.

All Protestant denominations in Vietnam were gathered by local communist government into a single organization called the Evangelical Church of Vietnam in 1975, which had around 500,000 official members in 1997. However, in 1988, a house church movement began when some active pastors were expelled from the official churches. One of the most prominent from those pastors was Tran Dinh Ai, whose movement reached 16,000 members and 165 churches (by 1997).

== Bible societies in Vietnam ==
Protestants made several Bible translations in 1926 and 1991, and translated separate books of Old Testament and New Testament into Vietnamese.

The organized work of United Bible Societies in Vietnam began in 1890. In 1966 the Vietnamese Bible Society was established. The Bible societies distributed 53,170 Bible examples and 120,170 New Testament examples in Vietnamese within the country in 2005. Two years earlier, in 2003, 60,000 copies of Bible and 50,000 copies of New Testament (all in Vietnamese) were printed in Vietnam with the permission of local authorities. Same year, 10,000 copies of the Chinese language Bible were printed in Vietnam for the local Chinese community. 7,555 copies of them were sold in a few months.

== Early 2000s ==
In the early 2000s, more than half of the Protestants were part of evangelical house churches. The growth of Protestantism has been most dramatic among ethnic minority peoples (Montagnards) such as the Mnong, E De, Jarai, and Bahnar. Pressure was reportedly put on Protestants in several northwestern villages to recant their faith in 2005, though there are fewer reports than in years past. Unsanctioned church meetings are routinely broken up and its members detained and harassed. In April 2001, the government gave official recognition to the Southern Evangelical Church of Vietnam. In 2005, hundreds of house churches that had been ordered to shut down in 2001, were quietly allowed to reopen. Over 100 refugees fled to Cambodia in the wake of a crackdown over large protests against land confiscation and a lack of religious freedom. In 2001, a historic Protestant church built in 1936 which was being petitioned for return to the local Christian community, was demolished. At least 54 people remain imprisoned due to their faith, including some Protestants. The New Life Fellowship, which has been seeking official recognition for eight years, was denied access in 2005 from meeting in Ho Chi Minh City. A Protestant pastor was forced to spend 12 months in psychiatric hospital on the disputed reason that he is delusional. In March 2007, a member of the main Hanoi congregation of the legally recognized Evangelical Church of Vietnam (North) Nguyễn Văn Đài was arrested for accusations relating to his defense of religious freedom, including disseminating alleged "infractions" of religious liberty.

Baptist and Mennonite movements were officially recognized by Hanoi in October 2007, which was deemed as some improvement of religious freedom in the country. By words of the Baptist Church Pastor Nguyen Thong, since 1989 his Church has attracted more than 18,400 followers with 500 ministers, practising in 135 congregations in 23 cities and provinces around the country.

=== 2020s ===
In 2020, the Government Committee for Religious Affairs reported that there were 1,120,000 Protestants in the country, across 100 organizations, 800 churches and 5,500 stations.

There continue to be many reports of discrimination, harassment and detention, although this is more prevalent among unregistered churches, especially within ethnic minorities. The government is keen to show tolerance and support of Protestant citizens.

== See also ==
- Christianity in Vietnam
- Evangelical Church of Vietnam – South
- Evangelical Church of Vietnam – North
- Mennonite Church in Vietnam
- Assemblies of God in Vietnam
- Montagnard (Vietnam)
