= Vietnam Evangelical Fellowship =

The Vietnam Evangelical Fellowship is a banned fundamentalist Christian group in Vietnam, led by Phạm Đình Nhân. As of 2007, it is not listed as a national member of the World Evangelical Alliance (Formerly World Evangelical Fellowship), but appears to be based on their philosophy.

Their legal committee was headed by Nguyen Hong Quang, General Secretary of the Mennonite Church in Vietnam, who was sentenced to 3 years in prison in 2004 for attacking two undercover government operatives.

The VEF's headquarters are in Ho Chi Minh City.

== 2004 Ordinance on Religion ==
On the June 18, 2004, the Vietnamese National Assembly issued an ordinance on religion. The Vietnam Evangelical Fellowship opposed this law, claiming "it is likely to permanently outlaw our house church organizations, none of which have been recognized since 1975. Many articles in this Ordinance will also provide a legal basis for local authorities to hinder and persecute the church." The VEF called for monthly fasting to get the Vietnamese government to "recognize God’s sovereignty" over Vietnam.

In this year, the United States of America's government added Vietnam to the list of "Countries of Particular Concern" regarding religion, giving it the option of pursuing 14 kinds of political and economic sanctions against Vietnam.

The Vietnam Evangelical Fellowship opposes sanctions against Vietnam, on the grounds it would hurt the Vietnamese people, with Phạm Đình Nhân saying "As a Christian leader I don’t want anything to make my people in the country suffer,".
