= Northern Vietnam key economic region =

Northern Vietnam key economic region Vùng kinh tế trọng điểm Bắc bộ
- Country: Vietnam
- Founder: 1997

Area
  - Total: 15,594 km^{2} (6,021 sq mi)

Population
  - Total: 14,589,000
  - Density: 935.55/km^{2} (2,423.1/sq mi)
- Time zone: UTC+07:00

Northern Vietnam key economic region (Vietnamese: Vùng kinh tế trọng điểm Bắc bộ) is one of the three key economic regions of Vietnam, encompassing the capital Hanoi which stands out as a political, cultural, economic, techno-scientific center driving the socio-economic development to neighboring provinces and municipalities.

== Composition ==
The Northern Key Economic Region covers 7 provinces and municipalities:

- Hanoi
- Haiphong
- Quang Ninh
- Bac Ninh
- Phu Tho Province
- Hung Yen Province
- Ninh Binh Province
