= Vietnam Mennonite Church =

The Vietnam Mennonite Church is a Mennonite denomination in Vietnam, with head offices in Ho Chi Minh City. It is a member of the Mennonite World Conference.

== History ==
The Church has its origins in an American mission in 1957. It was founded in 1964.

The Mennonite Central Committee, which is the social service branch of the Mennonite Church, was one of the few Western charitable organizations to continue work in Vietnam after the Northern regime communist victory in 1975 and the subsequent reunification of the country.

In 2001, it has about 10,000 members.

=== Controversies ===
The Church general secretary, vice president (and also a chairman of the Legal Committee of the Vietnam Evangelical Fellowship) Nguyen Hong Quang and his wife were several times arrested by the Vietnamese government. By some sources, the first arrest took place on or about August 1, 2001 in Ho Chi Minh City. The most recent arrest of Quang was in 2004 for allegedly practicing a non-sanctioned religion under Vietnam's 2004 Ordinance on Religion and Belief. Quang was sentenced to three years in jail, but released in 2005, after an international campaign to secure his release. Before his arrest pastor Nguyen Hong Quang sent a message to a friend alluding to his concerns, "The Church is now on stormy seas but the boat still goes out. The Lord enables us to row together. Be at peace. I ask you and the Church to pray for us."

Another five members of the church, called, along with Quang, the "Mennonite Six" (Rev. Nguyen Hong Quang, Evangelist Pham Ngoc Thach, Nguyen Thanh Phuong, Nguyen Thanh Nhan, Church elder Nguyen Huu Nghia, Children's worker Le Thi Hong Lien), were arrested under the same laws. The house church is not recognized as an official Protestant state church, and has therefore been a target of persecution by Vietnamese authorities.

In July 2005, Vietnamese government officials destroyed the home of the pastor Nguyen Hong Quang, while he was in detention, including the room where his congregation held worship services.

The Mennonite movement (together with Baptist one) was officially recognized by Hanoi in October 2007, which was estimated as some improvement of religious freedom in the country. Pastor Nguyen Quang Trung, provisional president of the Vietnam Mennonite Church, taking part in the official ceremony of the above authorisation, quoted his Church’s motto: "Living the Gospel, worshipping God, and serving the nation."

== See also ==
- Christianity in Vietnam
- Protestants in Vietnam
