= William Cadman =

William Cadman (4 April 1883 in Rotherhithe – 7 December 1948 in Da Lat) was an English missionary in Vietnam with his American wife Grace. William and his team printed the Bible in Hanoi, and his wife Grace was the primary translator of the Bible into Vietnamese, along with John Drange Olsen. The main Protestant version in use in Vietnam today is the "Cadman version."

Cadman was a printer by profession who, after conversion to Christianity, left England for theological school in Canada, then America. He enrolled to be a missionary in China, but from there, visited Vietnam where he met an American-born nurse Grace Hazenberg. They married in 1915 and had one daughter who died in Hanoi. The couple ran a printing shop in Hanoi from 1917 to 1942 when they were interned by the Japanese at Mỹ Tho. They were the only couple to remain after the war. Grace Cadman died on 24 April 1946 at the age of 69 and was buried at Mạc Đĩnh Chi Cemetery, Saigon. Cadman died in Dalat, on Sunday, 7 December, aged 65, and was buried there. The grave was recently restored by the local Protestant church.
