= Jean Bonet =

Jean Pierre Joseph Bonet (Bages, 21 November 1844 - Paris, 20 July 1907) was a French scholar of Vietnamese at the Ecole des Langues Orientales 1888–1907. He had spent 20 years in Vietnam, was author of one of the first Vietnamese-French dictionaries (1899), and first translator of a book of the New Testament (Gospel of Luke) into Vietnamese (for the Protestant Convention, Paris 1890, printed BFBS 1899). He was killed by being knocked down by a car while crossing the place de la Concorde.
