= Albert Schlicklin =

Missionary and priest

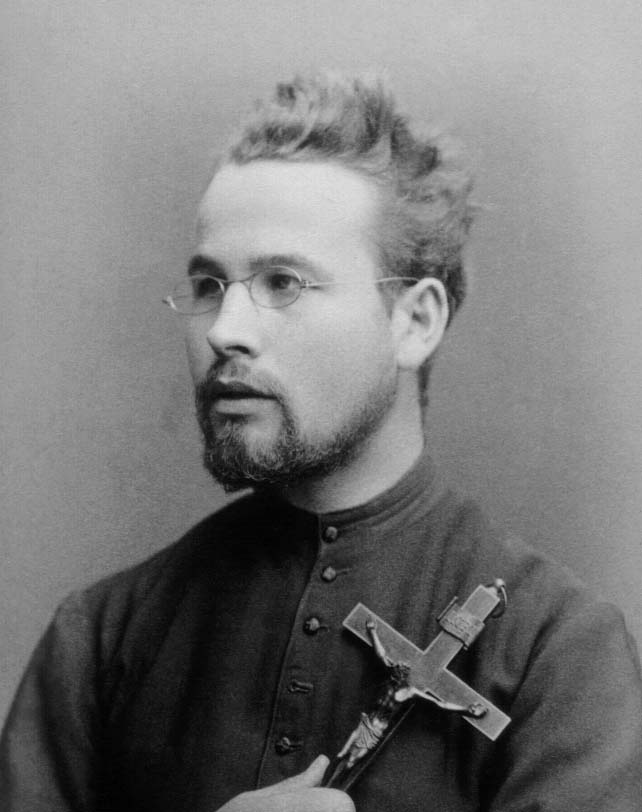
Image of Albert Schlicklin

Albert Schlicklin, Vietnamese name Cố Chính Linh (Liebsdorf, 12 November 1857 - Hanoi, 2 March 1932), was an Alsatian Catholic priest in Vietnam who translated the Bible from Latin into Vietnamese, as the Cô Chinh Linh version. His translation (1916) remained most popular among Catholics until 1970. He was sent to Vietnam by the Missions Etrangères de Paris in 1885.

== Bibliography ==
- Missions Etrangères de Paris Albert Schlicklin
