= B with flourish =

Letter of the Latin alphabet used in Middle Vietnamese

- Ꞗ ꞗ

Usage
- Writing system: Latin script
- Type: alphabetic
- Language of origin: Middle Vietnamese
- Sound values: [β]
- In Unicode: U+A796, U+A797

History
Development
O1
        - Β β
          - 𐌁
                - B b
                  - Ꞗ ꞗ
- Time period: 16th-19th century

B with flourish (Ꞗ, ꞗ) is the Unicode name for the third letter of the Middle Vietnamese alphabet, sorted between B and C. The B with flourish has a rounded hook that starts halfway up the stem (where the top of the bowl meets the ascender) and curves about 180 degrees counterclockwise, ending below the bottom-left corner. It represents the voiced bilabial fricative /β/, which in modern Vietnamese merged with the voiced labiodental fricative, written as the letter V in the Vietnamese alphabet. (In Middle Vietnamese, V represented the labio-velar approximant /w/.)

== Usage ==
The first page of the ꞗ section in de Rhodes's Dictionarium Annamiticum Lusitanum et Latinum

The B with flourish is known principally from the works of Jesuit missionary Alexandre de Rhodes, particularly his trilingual dictionary Dictionarium Annamiticum Lusitanum et Latinum (1651) and bilingual Cathechismus (1658). For example, vậy was written ꞗệy. As with the letter Đ, only the lowercase form ꞗ is seen in these works, even where a capital letter would be expected.

The Vietnamese alphabet was formally described for the first time in the 17th-century text Manuductio ad Linguam Tunckinensem, attributed to a Portuguese Jesuit missionary, possibly Francisco de Pina or Filipe Sibin. This passage about the letter Ꞗ was later incorporated into de Rhodes's Dictionarium:

…pronunciatur ferè ut β Græcum ut, ꞗĕaò ingredi, non eſt tamen omninò ſimile noſtro, V, conſonanti, ſed paulo aſperius, & in ipſa labiorum apertione pronuntiatur ita ut ſit verè litera labialis, ut Hebræi loquuntur, non autem dentalis.

— Alexandre de Rhodes, Lingue annamiticæ seu tunchinensis brevis declaratio

The passage roughly translates to:

…pronounced almost like the Greek β, for example, ꞗĕaò, to enter, yet not quite the same as our consonant V, but a little coarser, and in the very opening of the lips pronounced, indeed, as though it was a labial letter, as the Hebrews speak it, rather than a dental.

The linguistic interpretation of this description is that the sound was a voiced bilabial fricative, which phoneticians transcribe with the Greek letter beta [β].

Although some peculiarities of de Rhodes's orthography persisted into the early 19th century, the B with flourish had by then become V, as seen in the writings of Vietnamese Jesuit Philipphê Bỉnh (Philiphê do Rosario).

== Computer support ==
The lowercase B with flourish and a hypothetical uppercase form, unattested in de Rhodes's works, were standardized in June 2014 as part of the Latin Extended-D block of Unicode 7.0.

Character information
Preview	Ꞗ		ꞗ	
Unicode name	LATIN CAPITAL LETTER B WITH FLOURISH		LATIN SMALL LETTER B WITH FLOURISH	
Encodings	decimal	hex	dec	hex
Unicode	42902	U+A796	42903	U+A797
UTF-8	234 158 150	EA 9E 96	234 158 151	EA 9E 97
Numeric character reference	&#42902;	&#xA796;	&#42903;	&#xA797;

== See also ==
- Vietnamese apex, another distinctive element of de Rhodes's orthography
