= Vietnamese language =

Austroasiatic language

Vietnamese
- tiếng Việt
- Pronunciation: [tiəŋ˧˦ viət˺˧˨ʔ] (Hà Nội) [tiəŋ˦˧˥ viək˺˨˩ʔ] (Huế) [tiəŋ˦˥ viək˺˨˩˨] ~ [tiəŋ˦˥ jiək˺˨˩˨] (Sài Gòn)
- Native to: Vietnam
- Ethnicity: Viet (Kinh), Gin
- Speakers: L1: 86 million (2019–2023); L2: 11 million (2024); Total: 97 million (2019–2024)
- Language family: Austroasiatic: Vietic; Viet–Mường; Vietnamese
- Early forms: Proto-Austroasiatic: Proto-Vietic; Proto-Viet–Muong; Old Vietnamese; Middle Vietnamese
- Dialects: American
- Writing system: Latin (Vietnamese alphabet); Vietnamese Braille; Chữ Nôm (historical)

Official status
- Official language in: Vietnam
- Recognised minority language in: Czech Republic; Slovakia

Language codes
- ISO 639-1: vi
- ISO 639-2: vie
- ISO 639-3: vie
- Glottolog: viet1252
- Linguasphere: 46-EBA
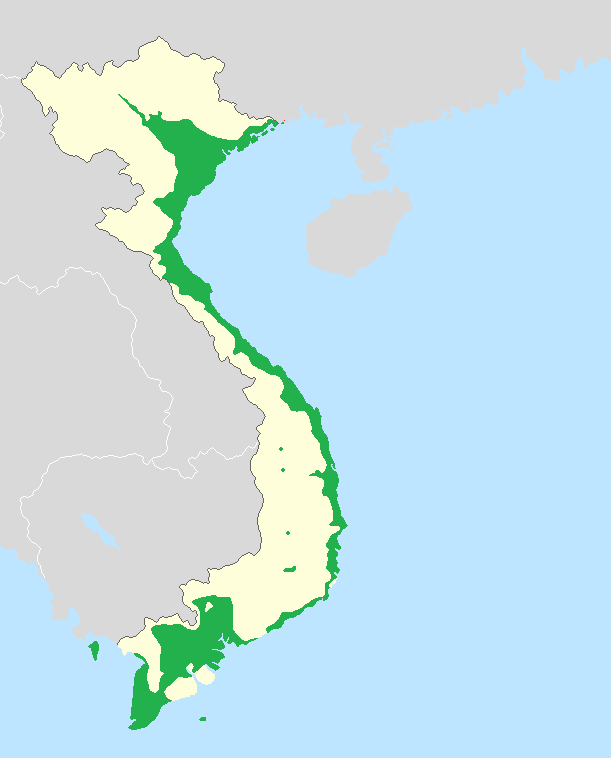
- Areas within Vietnam with majority Vietnamese speakers, mirroring the ethnic landscape of Vietnam with ethnic Vietnamese dominating around the lowland pale of the country.

Vietnamese (tiếng Việt) is an Austroasiatic language primarily spoken throughout Vietnam where it is the official language. It belongs to the Vietic subgroup of the Austroasiatic language family. Vietnamese is spoken natively by around 86 million people, and as a second language by 11 million people, several times as many as the rest of the Austroasiatic family combined. It is the native language of the Viet people and functions as the second or first language for other ethnicities in Vietnam. It has traditionally been divided into three dialect groups: Northern, Central, and Southern. It is also used by the worldwide Vietnamese diaspora.

Like many languages in Southeast Asia and East Asia, Vietnamese is an isolating language (highly analytic) and is tonal. Structurally, Vietnamese is mixed between head-initial and head-final directionalities: head-initial is more prominent in clausal structures while head-final may appear more in compounds, and modifiers generally follow the words they modify but sometimes precede them as well. Syntactically, Vietnamese is topic-prominent and strictly subject–verb–object. It also uses noun classifiers.

Vietnamese morphemes and phonological words are predominantly monosyllabic; however, many multisyllabic words do occur, usually as a result of compounding and reduplication. This aspect of Vietnamese allows for great efficiency in day-to-day writing, communication, and much more. Borrowings from Middle Chinese, known as Sino-Vietnamese vocabulary, make up a significant and important part of the lexicon. The vocabulary has also had influence from French.

Vietnamese currently is written using a Latin-based alphabet known as chữ Quốc ngữ. The alphabet largely relies on 17th-century Portuguese orthography, and was officially adopted in the early 20th century during French rule of Vietnam. It uses digraphs and diacritics to mark tones and some phonemes. Vietnamese was historically written using chữ Nôm, a logographic script composed of Chinese characters (called chữ Hán) and locally created characters to represent native Vietnamese words and sounds.

== Classification ==
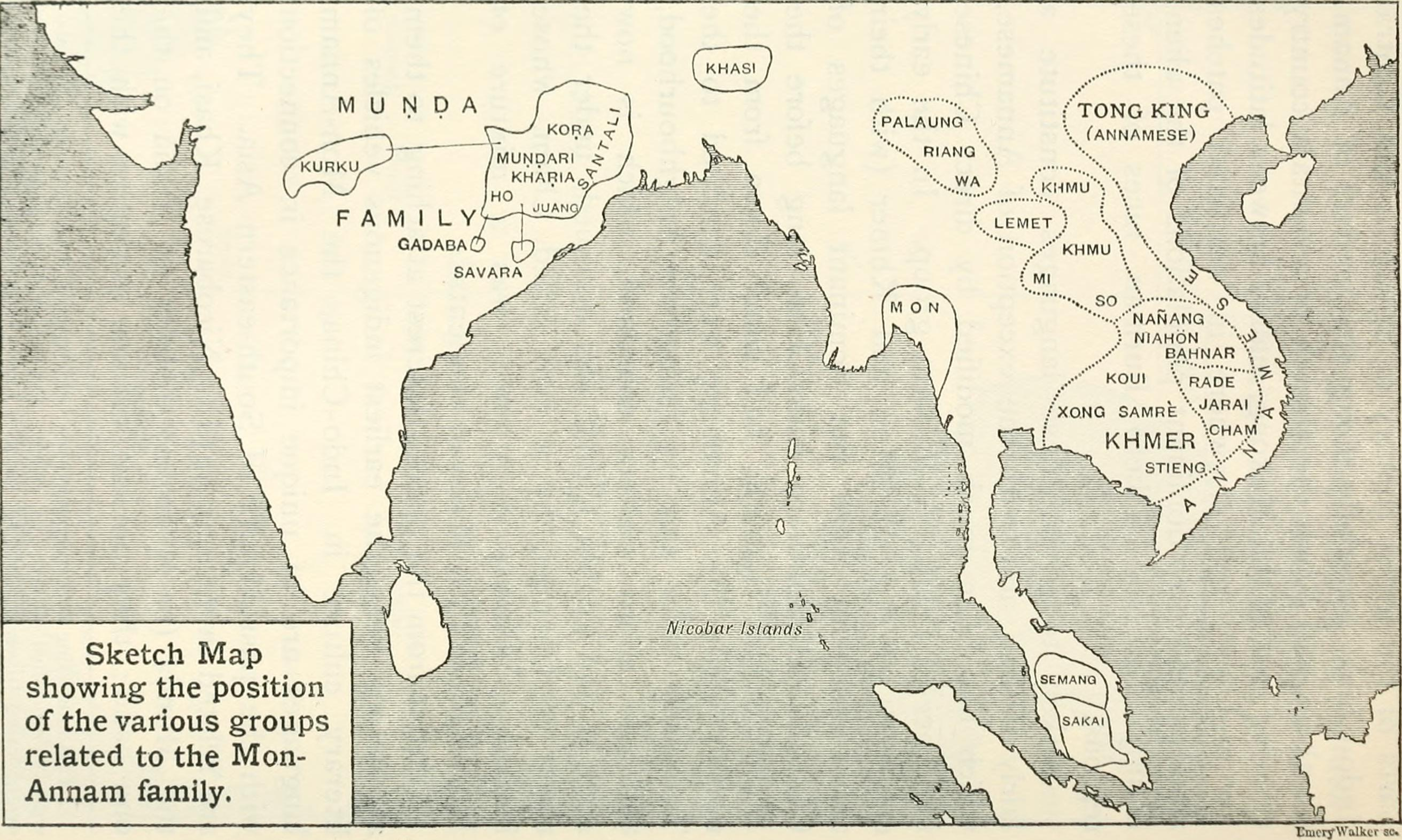
A 1906 analysis map of Austroasiatic languages (previously known as Mon-Annam languages) by British linguists Walter William Skeat and Charles Otto Blagden. Vietnamese is shown as Annamese.

Early linguistic work in the late 19th and early 20th centuries (Logan 1852, Forbes 1881, Müller 1888, Kuhn 1889, Schmidt 1905, Przyluski 1924, and Benedict 1942) classified Vietnamese as belonging to the Mon–Khmer branch of the Austroasiatic language family (which also includes the Khmer language spoken in Cambodia, and various smaller or regional languages, such as the Munda and Khasi languages spoken in eastern India, and others in Laos, southern China, and parts of Thailand). In 1850, British lawyer James Richardson Logan detected striking similarities between the Korku language in Central India and Vietnamese. He suggested that Korku, Mon, and Vietnamese were part of what he termed "Mon–Annam languages" in a paper published in 1856. Later, in 1920, French-Polish linguist Jean Przyluski found that Mường is more closely related to Vietnamese than other Mon–Khmer languages, and a Viet– Mường subgrouping was established, also including Thavung, Chut, Cuoi, and others. The term "Vietic" was proposed by Hayes (1992), who proposed to redefine Viet–Mường as referring to a subbranch of Vietic containing only Vietnamese and Mường. The term "Vietic" is used by Gérard Diffloth, among others, with a slightly different proposal on subclassification, within which the term "Viet–Mường" refers to a lower subgrouping (within an eastern Vietic branch) consisting of Vietnamese dialects, Mường dialects, and Nguồn (of Quảng Trị province).

== History ==
Austroasiatic is believed to have dispersed around 2000 BC. The arrival of the agricultural Phùng Nguyên culture in the Red River Delta at that time may correspond to the Vietic branch.

This ancestral Vietic was typologically very different from later Vietnamese. In addition to monosyllabic roots, it had sesquisyllabic roots consisting of a reduced syllable followed by a full syllable, and featured many consonant clusters. Both of these features are found elsewhere in Austroasiatic and in modern conservative Vietic languages south of the Red River area. The language was non-tonal, but featured glottal stop and voiceless fricative codas.

Borrowed vocabulary indicates early contact with speakers of Tai languages in the last millennium BCE, which is consistent with genetic evidence from Dong Son culture sites. Extensive contact with Chinese began during the Han dynasty (2nd century BCE). At this time, Vietic groups began to expand south from the Red River Delta and into the adjacent uplands, possibly to escape Chinese encroachment. The oldest layer of loans from Chinese into northern Vietic (which would become the Viet–Mường subbranch) date from this period.

The northern Vietic varieties thus became part of the Mainland Southeast Asia linguistic area, in which languages from genetically unrelated families converged toward characteristics such as isolating morphology and similar syllable structure. Many languages in this area, including Viet–Mường, underwent a process of tonogenesis, in which distinctions formerly expressed by final consonants became phonemic tonal distinctions when those consonants disappeared. These characteristics have become part of many of the genetically unrelated languages of Southeast Asia; for example, Tsat (a member of the Malayo-Polynesian group within Austronesian) and Vietnamese each developed tones as a phonemic feature.

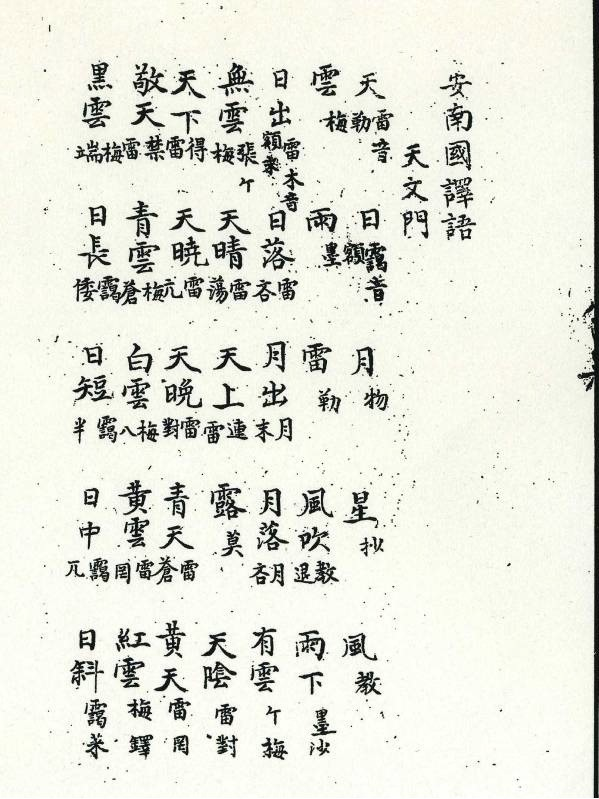
An Nam quốc dịch ngữ 安南國譯語 records the pronunciations of 15th-century Vietnamese, such as for 天 (sky) – 雷 /luei/ representing blời (Modern Vietnamese: trời).

After the split from Mường around the end of the first millennium CE, the following stages of Vietnamese are commonly identified as Ancient, Middle, and Modern:

Ancient (or Old) Vietnamese
(to c. 1500) Sources include the Ming glossary Ānnánguó yìyǔ (安南國譯語, c. 15th century) from the Huayi yiyu series, (Note: The Bureau of Interpreters used Chinese approximations to record Vietnamese rather than use Sino-Vietnamese to record as has been done in Annan Yiyu 安南譯語, a prior work.) and a Buddhist sutra recorded in an early form of chữ Nôm, variously dated to the 12th and 15th centuries. Compared with Proto-Vietic, the language had lost the voicing distinction on stop initials, giving rise to a tone split, and implosive initials had become nasals. Most of the minor syllables of Proto-Vietic were still present.
Middle Vietnamese
(16th to 19th centuries) Middle Vietnamese is the language found in Dictionarium Annamiticum Lusitanum et Latinum (1651) of the Jesuit missionary Alexandre de Rhodes. Another famous dictionary of this period was written by Pierre Pigneau de Behaine in 1773 and published by Jean-Louis Taberd in 1838.
Modern Vietnamese
(from the 19th century)

After expelling the Chinese at the beginning of the 10th century, the Ngô dynasty adopted Classical Chinese as the formal medium of government, scholarship, and literature. With the dominance of Chinese came wholesale importation of Chinese vocabulary. The resulting Sino-Vietnamese vocabulary makes up about a third of the Vietnamese lexicon in all realms, and may account for as much as 60% of the vocabulary used in formal texts.

Vietic languages were confined to the northern third of modern Vietnam until the "southward advance" (Nam tiến) from the late 15th century. The conquest of the ancient nation of Champa and of the Mekong Delta led to an expansion of the Vietnamese people and language, with distinctive local variations emerging.

After France invaded Vietnam in the late 19th century, French gradually replaced Literary Chinese as the official language in education and government. Vietnamese adopted many French terms, such as đầm ('dame', from madame), ga ('train station', from gare), sơ mi ('shirt', from chemise), and búp bê ('doll', from poupée), resulting in a language that was Austroasiatic but with major Chinese influences and relatively minor French influences from the French colonial era.

=== Proto-Vietic ===
The following diagram shows the consonants of Proto-Vietic, along with the outcomes in the modern language: (Note: The branch Ferlus called Viet–Muong is today called Vietic, with the former term now restricted to the subbranch consisting of Vietnamese and Muong.)

Proto-Vietic consonants
		Labial	Alveolar	Palatal	Velar	Glottal
Nasal		*m > m	*n > n	*ɲ > nh	*ŋ > ng/ngh	
Stop	tenuis	*p > b	*t > đ	*c > ch	*k > k/c/q	*ʔ > #
Stop	voiced	*b > b	*d > đ	*ɟ > ch	*ɡ > k/c/q	
Stop	aspirated	*pʰ > ph	*tʰ > th		*kʰ > kh	
Stop	implosive	*ɓ > m	*ɗ > n	*ʄ > nh		
Affricate				*tʃ > x		
Fricative			*s > t			*h > h
Approximant		*w > v	*l > l	*j > d		
Rhotic			*r > r			

The aspirated stops are uncommon and result from clusters of stops and */h/. The proto-phoneme */tʃ/ is also uncommon and has reflexes only in Viet-Mường. However, it occurs in some important words and is cognate with Khmu /c/. Ferlus 1992 also included phonemes */dʒ/ and */ɕ/ in the inventory of Proto-Vietic.

Proto-Vietic had monosyllables CV(C) and sesquisyllables C-CV(C). The following initial clusters occurred, with outcomes indicated:

- *pr, *br, *tr, *dr, *cr, *kr, *gr > /kʰr/ > /kʂ/ > s
- *pl, *bl > MV bl > Northern gi, Southern tr
- *kl, *gl > MV tl > tr
- *ml > MV ml > mnh > nh
- *kj > gi

=== Lenition of medial consonants ===
As noted above, Proto-Vietic had sesquisyllabic words with an initial minor syllable (in addition to, and independent of, initial clusters in the main syllable). When a minor syllable occurred, the main syllable's initial consonant was intervocalic and as a result suffered lenition, becoming a voiced fricative. These fricatives were not present in Proto-Viet–Mường, as indicated by their absence in Mường, but were present in Vietnamese until the 15th or 16th centuries. Subsequent loss of the minor-syllable prefixes phonemicized the fricatives. Ferlus 1992 proposes that originally there were both voiced and voiceless fricatives, corresponding to original voiced or voiceless stops, but Ferlus 2009 appears to have abandoned that hypothesis, suggesting that stops were softened and voiced at approximately the same time, according to the following pattern:

- *p, *b > /β/ > v. In Middle Vietnamese, the outcome of these sounds was written with a hooked b (ꞗ), representing a /β/ that was still distinct from v (then pronounced /w/).
- *t, *d > /ð/ > d
- *c, *ɟ, *tʃ > /ʝ/ > gi
- *k, *ɡ > /ɣ/ > g/gh
- *s > /r̝/ > r

=== Origin of tones ===
Proto-Vietic did not have tones. Tones developed later in some of the daughter languages from distinctions in the initial and final consonants. Vietnamese tones developed as follows:

Register	Initial consonant	Smooth ending	Glottal ending	Fricative ending
High (first) register	Voiceless	A1 ngang "level"	B1 sắc "sharp"	C1 hỏi "asking"
Low (second) register	Voiced	A2 huyền "deep"	B2 nặng "heavy"	C2 ngã "tumbling"

Glottal-ending syllables ended with a glottal stop /ʔ/, while fricative-ending syllables ended with /s/ or /h/. Both types of syllables could co-occur with a resonant (e.g. /m/ or /n/).

At some point, a tone split occurred, as in many other mainland Southeast Asian languages. Essentially, an allophonic distinction developed in the tones whereby those in syllables with voiced initials were pronounced differently from those with voiceless initials. (Approximately speaking, the voiced allotones were pronounced with additional breathy voice or creaky voice and with lowered pitch. The quality difference predominates in today's northern varieties, e.g., in Hanoi, while in the southern varieties the pitch difference predominates, as in Ho Chi Minh City.) Later the plain-voiced stops became voiceless and the allotones became new phonemic tones.

The implosive stops (ɓ, ɗ and ʄ) were unaffected, and in fact developed tonally as if they were unvoiced. (This behavior is common to all East Asian languages with implosive stops.) These stops merged with the corresponding nasals (m, n and ɲ) before the Old Vietnamese period.

As noted above, consonants following minor syllables became voiced fricatives. The minor syllables were eventually lost, but not until the tone split had occurred. As a result, words in modern Vietnamese with voiced fricatives occur in all six tones, and the tonal register reflects the voicing of the minor-syllable prefix and not the voicing of the Proto-Vietic main-syllable stop that produced the fricative. For similar reasons, words beginning with /l/ and /ŋ/ occur in both registers. (Thompson 1976 reconstructed voiceless resonants to account for outcomes where resonants occur with a first-register tone, but this is no longer considered necessary, at least by Ferlus.)

A large number of words were borrowed from Middle Chinese, forming part of the Sino-Vietnamese vocabulary. These caused the original introduction of the retroflex sounds /ʂ/ and /ʈ/ (modern s, tr) into the language.

=== Old Vietnamese ===
Old (or Ancient) Vietnamese separated from Mường around the 9th century. The sources for the reconstruction of Old Vietnamese are Nom texts, such as the 12th-century/1486 Buddhist scripture Phật thuyết Đại báo phụ mẫu ân trọng kinh ("Sūtra explained by the Buddha on the Great Repayment of the Heavy Debt to Parents"), old inscriptions, and a late 13th-century (possibly 1293) Annan Jishi glossary by Chinese diplomat Chen Fu (c. 1259 – 1309).

Old Vietnamese initial consonants
		Labial	Alveolar	Palatal	Velar	Glottal
Nasal		m	n	ɲ	ŋ	
Implosives		ɓ	ɗ			
Stop	tenuis			c	k	ʔ
Stop	aspirated	pʰ	tʰ		kʰ	
Fricative	voiceless	ɸ	s ʃ	ç	x	h
Fricative	voiced	β v	ð	ʝ	ɣ	
Approximant			l			
Rhotic			r			

The Đại báo used Chinese characters phonetically where each word, monosyllabic in Modern Vietnamese, is written with two Chinese characters or in a composite character made of two different characters. This conveys the transformation of the Vietnamese lexicon from sesquisyllabic to fully monosyllabic under the pressure of Chinese linguistic influence, characterized by linguistic phenomena such as the reduction of minor syllables; loss of affixal morphology drifting towards analytical grammar; simplification of major syllable segments, and the change of suprasegment instruments. For example,

- The modern Vietnamese word trời 'heaven' was *plời in Old Vietnamese and blời in Middle Vietnamese.
- The modern Vietnamese expressive vỗ về /vo˧ˀ˦˥ ve˨˩/ 'comfort' was glossed in the Đại báo as (阿)寵(阿)弄 a phổ a phê /(a)-fo˧˩˧ (a)-fe˧/, which is reconstructed by Shimizu (2015) as *a¹-ɸo³ a¹-ɸe¹ in Old Vietnamese, and later became voiced as βo⁴ βe² in Middle Vietnamese.

Subsequent changes to initial consonants included:

- re-introduction of implosive stops p > ɓ and t > ɗ
- s > ts > t
- tʃ > ɕ
- a merger j > ð

=== Middle Vietnamese ===
The writing system used for Vietnamese is based closely on the system developed by Alexandre de Rhodes for his 1651 Dictionarium Annamiticum Lusitanum et Latinum. It reflects the pronunciation of the Vietnamese of Hanoi at that time, a stage commonly termed Middle Vietnamese (tiếng Việt trung đại). The pronunciation of the "rime" of the syllable, i.e. all parts other than the initial consonant (optional /w/ glide, vowel nucleus, tone and final consonant), appears nearly identical between Middle Vietnamese and modern Hanoi pronunciation. On the other hand, the Middle Vietnamese pronunciation of the initial consonant differs greatly from all modern dialects, and in fact is significantly closer to the modern Saigon dialect than the modern Hanoi dialect.

The first page of the ꞗ section in Alexandre de Rhodes's Dictionarium Annamiticum Lusitanum et Latinum (Vietnamese–Portuguese–Latin dictionary)

The following diagram shows the orthography and pronunciation of Middle Vietnamese:

Middle Vietnamese consonants
		Labial	Dental/ Alveolar	Retroflex	Palatal	Velar	Glottal
Nasal		m [m]	n [n]		nh [ɲ]	ng/ngh [ŋ]	
Stop	tenuis	p [p]^{1}	t [t]	tr [ʈ]	ch [c]	c/k [k]	
Stop	aspirated	ph [pʰ]	th [tʰ]			kh [kʰ]	
Stop	implosive	b [ɓ]	đ [ɗ]				
Fricative	voiceless			s [ʂ]	x [ɕ]		h [h]
Fricative	voiced	ꞗ [β]^{2}	d [ð]		gi [ʝ]	g/gh [ɣ]	
Approximant		v/u/o [w]	l [l]		y/i/ĕ [j]^{3}		
Rhotic			r [r]				

^1 [p] occurs only at the end of a syllable.
^2 This letter, ⟨ꞗ⟩, is no longer used.
^3 [j] does not occur at the beginning of a syllable, but can occur at the end of a syllable, where it is notated i or y (with the difference between the two often indicating differences in the quality or length of the preceding vowel), and after /ð/ and /β/, where it is notated ĕ. This ĕ, and the /j/ it notated, have disappeared from the modern language.

Note that b [ɓ] and p [p] never contrast in any position, suggesting that they are allophones.

The language also has three clusters at the beginning of syllables, which have since disappeared:

- tl /tl/ > modern tr – tlước > trước (written in chữ Nôm as 𫏾 (⿰車畧) where 車 represented the initial tl- sound).
- bl /ɓl/ > modern gi (Northern), tr (Southern) – blăng > trăng/giăng (written in chữ Nôm as 𪩮 (⿱巴夌) where 巴 represented the initial bl- sound).
- ml /ml/ > mnh /mɲ/ > modern nh (Northern), l (Southern) – mlời > lời/nhời (written in chữ Nôm as 𠅜 (⿱亠例) where 亠 (simplified from 麻; 𫜗 [⿱麻例]) represented the initial ml- sound).

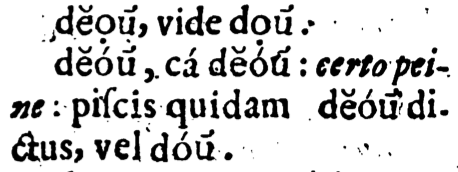
de Rhodes's entry for dĕóu᷃ shows distinct breves, acutes and apices.

Most of the unusual correspondences between spelling and modern pronunciation are explained by Middle Vietnamese. Note in particular:

- de Rhodes' system has two different b letters, ⟨b⟩ and ⟨ꞗ⟩. The latter apparently represented a voiced bilabial fricative /β/. Within a century or so, both /β/ and /w/ had merged as /v/, spelled as v.
- de Rhodes' system has a second medial glide /j/ that is written ĕ and appears in some words with initial d and hooked b. These later disappear.
- đ /ɗ/ was (and still is) alveolar, whereas d /ð/ was dental. The choice of symbols was based on the dental rather than alveolar nature of /d/ and its allophone [ð] in Spanish and other Romance languages. The inconsistency with the symbols assigned to /ɓ/ vs. /β/ was based on the lack of any such place distinction between the two, with the result that the stop consonant /ɓ/ appeared more "normal" than the fricative /β/. In both cases, the implosive nature of the stops does not appear to have had any role in the choice of symbol.
- x was the alveolo-palatal fricative /ɕ/ rather than the dental /s/ of the modern language. In 17th-century Portuguese, the common language of the Jesuits, s was the apico-alveolar sibilant /s̺/ (as still in much of Spain and some parts of Portugal), while x was a palatoalveolar /ʃ/. The similarity of apicoalveolar /s̺/ to the Vietnamese retroflex /ʂ/ led to the assignment of s and x as above.

De Rhodes's orthography also made use of an apex diacritic on o᷃ and u᷃ to indicate a final labial-velar nasal /ŋ͡m/, an allophone of /ŋ/ that is peculiar to the Hanoi dialect to the present day. An example is xao᷃ /ɕawŋ͡m^{A1}/, which later became xong. This diacritic is often mistaken for a tilde in modern reproductions of early Vietnamese writing.

=== Modern era ===
During French Indochina, a large number of new vocabulary items were introduced into Vietnamese, including ones from Japanese wasei-kango for Western-originated concepts, adopted through Sino-Vietnamese pronunciation.

Following the defeat of South Vietnam in 1975 by North Vietnam in the Vietnam War, the Vietnamese language within Vietnam has gradually shifted towards the Northern dialect. Hanoi, the largest city in Northern Vietnam was made the capital of Vietnam in 1976. A study stated that "The gap in vocabulary use between speakers in North and South Vietnam is now much narrower than before. There is little to distinguish between how the generations that were born and grew up in the South after 1975 now speak, compared to their peers in the North. This gap is almost non-existent in newspapers, on radio and television, and in websites." However, this convergence does not apply to emigrants, in which the study states represent "culture freeze", a phenomenon that describes when culture among emigrants is frozen in time and does not evolve with culture in their home country once they move to a new country.

Here, culture freeze describes that the use of the language of emigrants from Vietnam has been "frozen" in both vocabulary and pronunciation, and as languages gradually evolve over time, has come to differ slightly from than the present Vietnamese language in Vietnam. Additionally, as immigration to the United States following the Vietnam war was primarily driven due to political reasons, the Southern Vietnamese dialect was initially strongly linked to social identity. During and after the Vietnam War, thousands of Southern Vietnamese immigrated to the United States with the partnership between Saigon and the US. In contrast, during and following the Vietnam War, thousands of Northern Vietnamese moved to the Czech Republic due to Hanoi's partnership with the now obsolete Czechoslovak Socialist Republic. As a result, today, the Vietnamese language is generally taught through the Northern dialect in the Czech Republic in contrast with the Southern dialect in the United States.

== Geographic distribution ==
Global distribution of speakers

As a result of emigration, Vietnamese speakers are also found in other parts of Southeast Asia, East Asia, North America, Europe, and Australia. Vietnamese has also been officially recognized as a minority language in the Czech Republic. (Note: Citizens belonging to minorities, which traditionally and on long-term basis live within the territory of the Czech Republic, enjoy the right to use their language in communication with authorities and in front of the courts of law (for the list of recognized minorities see National Minorities Policy of the Government of the Czech Republic, Belarusian and Vietnamese since 4 July 2013, see Česko má nové oficiální národnostní menšiny. Vietnamce a Bělorusy). The article 25 of the Czech Charter of Fundamental Rights and Basic Freedoms ensures right of the national and ethnic minorities for education and communication with authorities in their own language. Act No. 500/2004 Coll. (The Administrative Rule) in its paragraph 16 (4) (Procedural Language) ensures, that a citizen of the Czech Republic, who belongs to a national or an ethnic minority, which traditionally and on long-term basis lives within the territory of the Czech Republic, have right to address an administrative agency and proceed before it in the language of the minority. In the case that the administrative agency does not have an employee with knowledge of the language, the agency is bound to obtain a translator at the agency's own expense. According to Act No. 273/2001 (About The Rights of Members of Minorities) paragraph 9 (The right to use language of a national minority in dealing with authorities and in front of the courts of law) the same applies for the members of national minorities also in front of the courts of law.)

As the national language, Vietnamese is the lingua franca in Vietnam. It is also spoken by the Jing people traditionally residing on three islands (now joined to the mainland) off Dongxing in southern Guangxi Province, China. A large number of Vietnamese speakers also reside in neighboring countries of Cambodia and Laos.

In the United States, Vietnamese is the sixth most spoken language, with over 1.5 million speakers, who are concentrated in a handful of states. It is the third-most spoken language in Texas and Washington; fourth-most in Georgia, Louisiana, and Virginia; and fifth-most in Arkansas and California. Vietnamese is the third most spoken language in Australia other than English, after Mandarin and Arabic. In France, it is the most spoken Asian language and the eighth most spoken immigrant language at home.

=== Official status ===
Vietnamese is the sole official and national language of Vietnam. It is the first language of the majority of the Vietnamese population, as well as a first or second language for the country's ethnic minority groups.

In the Czech Republic, Vietnamese has been recognized as one of 14 minority languages, on the basis of communities that have resided in the country either traditionally or on a long-term basis. This status grants the Vietnamese community in the country a representative on the Government Council for Nationalities, an advisory body of the Czech Government for matters of policy towards national minorities and their members. It also grants the community the right to use Vietnamese with public authorities and in courts anywhere in the country. Vietnamese was also recognized as a national minority language in Slovakia in 2023.

In the U.S. city of San Francisco, municipal services began to be offered in Vietnamese starting in 2024.

=== As a foreign language ===
Vietnamese is taught in schools and institutions outside of Vietnam, a large part contributed by its diaspora. In countries with Vietnamese-speaking communities Vietnamese language education largely serves as a role to link descendants of Vietnamese immigrants to their ancestral culture. In neighboring countries and vicinities near Vietnam such as Southern China, Cambodia, Laos, and Thailand, Vietnamese as a foreign language is largely due to trade, as well as recovery and growth of the Vietnamese economy.

Since the 1980s, Vietnamese language schools (trường Việt ngữ) have been established for youth in many Vietnamese-speaking communities around the world such as in the United States, Germany, and France.

== Phonology ==
=== Vowels ===
Vietnamese has a large number of vowels. There are 11 vowels, 18 diphthongs and 4 triphthongs though mergers may happen in colloquial and especially Southern Vietnamese speech. Below is a vowel diagram of Standard Vietnamese and Vietnamese from Hanoi (including centering diphthongs):

	Front	Central	Back
Centering	/iə/~/ie/ ⟨ia⟩/⟨iê⟩	/ɯə/~/ɯɤ/ ⟨ưa⟩/⟨ươ⟩	/uə̯/~/uo/ ⟨ua⟩/⟨uô⟩
Close	i ⟨i⟩/⟨y⟩	ɯ ⟨ư⟩	u ⟨u⟩
Close-mid/ Mid	e ⟨ê⟩	ɤ ⟨ơ⟩ ɤ̆/ʌ ⟨â⟩	o ⟨ô⟩
Open-mid/ Open	ɛ ⟨e⟩	a ⟨a⟩ ă/ɐ ⟨ă⟩	ɔ ⟨o⟩

Front and central vowels (i, ê, e, ư, â, ơ, ă, a) are unrounded, whereas the back vowels (u, ô, o) are rounded. The vowels â [ɤ̆] and ă [ă] are pronounced very short, much shorter than the other vowels. Thus, ơ and â are basically pronounced the same except that ơ [ɤ] is of normal length while â [ɤ̆] is short – the same applies to the vowels long a [a] and short ă [ă]. (Note: There are different descriptions of Hanoi vowels. Another common description is that of (Thompson 1991): / Front / Central / Back; / Front / Central / unrounded / rounded; Centering / ia~iê [iə̯] / / ưa~ươ [ɯə̯] / ua~uô [uə̯]; Close / i [i] / / ư [ɯ] / u [u]; Close-mid / ê [e] / / ơ [ɤ] / ô [o]; Open-mid / e [ɛ] / ă [ɐ] / â [ʌ] / o [ɔ]; Open / / a [a]; This description distinguishes four degrees of vowel height and a rounding contrast (rounded vs. unrounded) between back vowels. The relative shortness of ă and â would then be a secondary feature. Thompson describes the vowel ă [ɐ] as being slightly higher (upper low) than a [a].)

The centering diphthongs are formed with only the three high vowels (i, ư, u). They are generally spelled as ia, ưa, ua when they end a word and are spelled iê, ươ, uô, respectively, when they are followed by a consonant.

In addition to single vowels (or monophthongs) and centering diphthongs, Vietnamese has closing diphthongs (Note: In Vietnamese, diphthongs are âm đôi.) and triphthongs. The closing diphthongs and triphthongs consist of a main vowel component followed by a shorter semivowel offglide /j/ or /w/. (Note: The closing diphthongs and triphthongs as described by Thompson can be compared with the description above: / /w/ offglide / / /j/ offglide; Centering / iêu [iə̯w] / ươu [ɯə̯w] / ươi [ɯə̯j] / uôi [uə̯j]; Close / iu [iw] / ưu [ɯw] / ưi [ɯj] / ui [uj]; Close-mid / êu [ew] / – âu [ʌw] / ơi [ɤj] ây [ʌj] / ôi [oj]; Open-mid / eo [ɛw] / – âu [ʌw] / ơi [ɤj] ây [ʌj] / oi [ɔj]; Open / / ao [aw] au [ɐw] / ai [aj] ay [ɐj]) There are restrictions on the high offglides: /j/ cannot occur after a front vowel (i, ê, e) nucleus and /w/ cannot occur after a back vowel (u, ô, o) nucleus. (Note: The lack of diphthong consisting of a ơ + back offglide (i.e., [əːw]) is an apparent gap.)

	/w/ offglide		/j/ offglide	
	Front	Central		Back
Centering	[iə̯w] ⟨iêu⟩	[ɯə̯w] ⟨ươu⟩	[ɯə̯j] ⟨ươi⟩	[uə̯j] ⟨uôi⟩
Close	[iw] ⟨iu⟩	[ɯw] ⟨ưu⟩	[ɯj] ⟨ưi⟩	[uj] ⟨ui⟩
Close-mid/ Mid	[ew] ⟨êu⟩	– [ʌw] ⟨âu⟩	[ɤj] ⟨ơi⟩ [ʌj] ⟨ây⟩	[oj] ⟨ôi⟩
Open-mid/ Open	[ɛw] ⟨eo⟩	[aw] ⟨ao⟩ [ɐw] ⟨au⟩	[aj] ⟨ai⟩ [ɐj] ⟨ay⟩	[ɔj] ⟨oi⟩

The correspondence between the orthography and pronunciation is complicated. For example, the offglide /j/ is usually written as i; however, it may also be represented with y. In addition, in the diphthongs [ɐj] and [aj] the letters y and i also indicate the pronunciation of the main vowel: ay = ă + /j/, ai = a + /j/. Thus, tay "hand" is [tɐj] while tai "ear" is [taj]. Similarly, u and o indicate different pronunciations of the main vowel: au = ă + /w/, ao = a + /w/. Thus, thau "brass" is [t̺ʰɐw] while thao "raw silk" is [tʰaw].

=== Consonants ===
The consonants that occur in Vietnamese are listed below; their representations according to Vietnamese orthography are shown to their right if they differ from their representation in the IPA.

		Labial	Dental/ Alveolar	Retroflex	(Alveolo-) palatal	Velar	Glottal
Nasal		m	n		ɲ ⟨nh⟩	ŋ ⟨ng, ngh⟩	
Plosive/ Affricate	tenuis	p	t ⟨t⟩	ʈ ~ t͡ʂ ⟨tr⟩	c ~ t͡ɕ ⟨ch⟩	k ⟨c, k, q⟩	
Plosive/ Affricate	aspirated		tʰ ⟨th⟩				
Implosive		ɓ ⟨b⟩	ɗ ⟨đ⟩				
Fricative	voiceless	f ⟨ph⟩	s ⟨x⟩	ʂ ⟨s⟩		x ⟨kh⟩	h
Fricative	voiced	v	z ⟨d, gi⟩	ʐ ⟨r⟩		ɣ ⟨g, gh⟩	
Approximant			l		j ⟨y, i⟩	w ⟨u, o⟩	
Rhotic			r				

Some consonant sounds are written with only one letter (like "p"), other consonant sounds are written with a digraph (like "ph"), and others are written with more than one letter or digraph (the velar stop is written variously as "c", "k", or "q"). In some cases, they are based on their Middle Vietnamese pronunciation; since that period, ph and kh (but not th) have evolved from aspirated stops into fricatives (like Greek phi and chi), while d and gi have collapsed and converged together (into /z/ in the north and /j/ in the south).

Not all dialects of Vietnamese have the same consonant in a given word (although all dialects use the same spelling in the written language). See the language variation section for further elaboration.

Syllable-final orthographic ch and nh in Vietnamese has had different analyses. One analysis has final ch, nh (as phonemes /c/, /ɲ/) contrasting with syllable-final t, c (/t/, /k/) and n, ng (/n/, /ŋ/) and identifies final ch with the syllable-initial ch /c/. The other analysis has final ch and nh as predictable allophonic variants of the velar phonemes /k/ and /ŋ/ that occur after the upper front vowels i /i/ and ê /e/; although they also occur after a, but in such cases are believed to have resulted from an earlier e /ɛ/ which diphthongized to ai (cf. ach from aic, anh from aing). (See Vietnamese phonology: Analysis of final ch, nh for further details.)

=== Tones ===
Pitch contours and duration of the six Northern Vietnamese tones as spoken by a male speaker (not from Hanoi). Fundamental frequency is plotted over time. From Nguyễn & Edmondson (1998).

Each Vietnamese syllable is pronounced with one of six inherent tones, (Note: Tone is called thanh điệu or thanh in Vietnamese. Tonal language in Vietnamese translates to ngôn ngữ âm sắc.) centered on the main vowel or group of vowels. Tones differ in:

- length (duration)
- pitch contour (i.e. pitch melody)
- pitch height
- phonation

Tone is indicated by diacritics written above or below the vowel (most of the tone diacritics appear above the vowel; except the nặng tone dot diacritic goes below the vowel). (Note: The name of each tone has the corresponding tonal diacritic on the vowel.) The six tones in the northern varieties (including Hanoi), with their self-referential Vietnamese names, are:

Name and meaning	Description	Contour	Diacritic	Example	Sample vowel	Unicode
ngang 'level'	mid level	˧	(no mark)	ma 'ghost'	a	
huyền 'deep'	low falling (often breathy)	˨˩	◌̀ (grave accent)	mà 'but'	à	U+0340 or U+0300
sắc 'sharp'	high rising	˧˥	◌́ (acute accent)	má 'cheek, mother (southern)'	á	U+0341 or U+0301
hỏi 'questioning'	mid dipping-rising	˧˩˧	◌̉ (hook above)	mả 'tomb, grave'	ả	U+0309
ngã 'tumbling'	creaky high breaking-rising	˧ˀ˦˥	◌̃ (tilde)	mã 'horse (Sino-Vietnamese), code'	ã	U+0342 or U+0303
nặng 'heavy'	creaky low falling constricted (short length)	˨˩ˀ	◌̣ (dot below)	mạ 'rice seedling'	ạ	U+0323

Other dialects of Vietnamese may have fewer tones (typically only five).

Tonal differences of three speakers as reported in Hwa-Froelich & Hodson (2002). The curves represent temporal pitch variation while two sloped lines (//) indicates a glottal stop.
Tone	Northern dialect	Southern dialect	Central dialect
Ngang (a)			
Huyền (à)			
Sắc (á)			
Hỏi (ả)			
Ngã (ã)			
Nặng (ạ)			

In Vietnamese poetry, tones are classed into two groups: (tone pattern)

Tone group	Tones within tone group
bằng "level, flat"	ngang and huyền
trắc "oblique, sharp"	sắc, hỏi, ngã, and nặng

Words with tones belonging to a particular tone group must occur in certain positions within the poetic verse.

Vietnamese Catholics practice a distinctive style of prayer recitation called đọc kinh, in which each tone is assigned a specific note or sequence of notes.

==== Old tonal classification ====
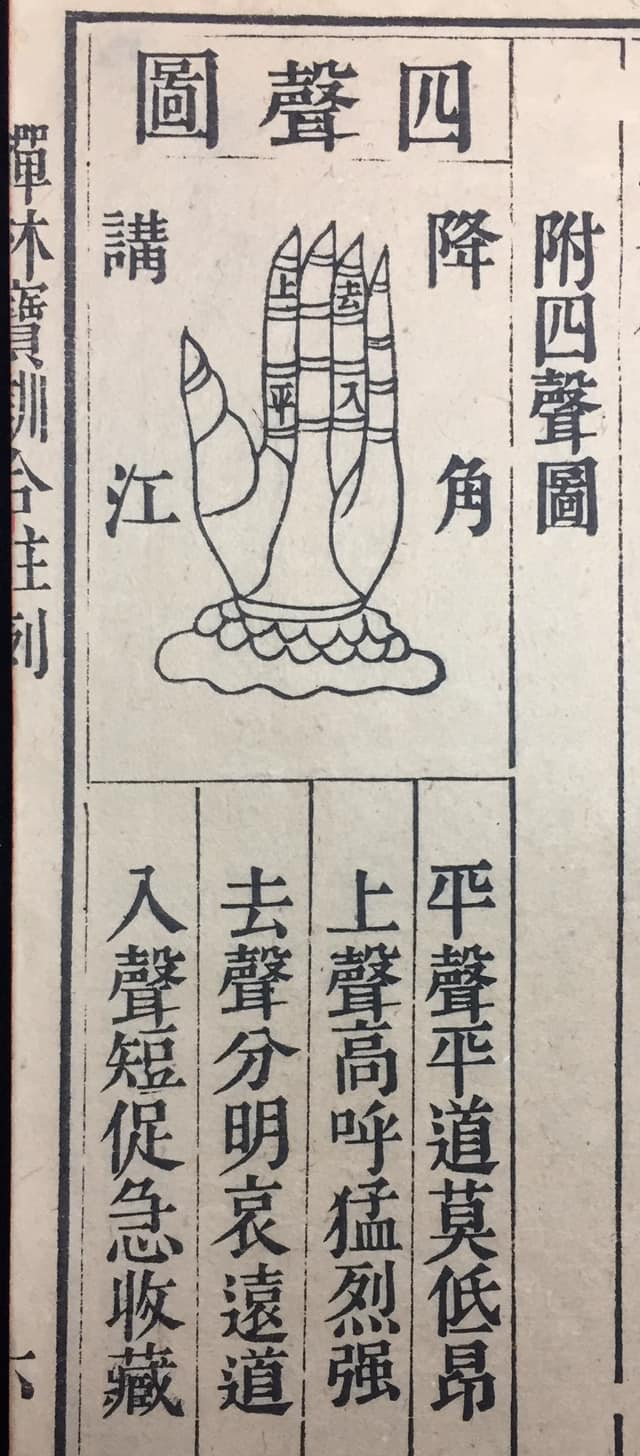
Four tones diagram shown in the book Thiền lâm bảo huấn hợp chú 禪林寶訓合註 (1858; Tự Đức thập nhất niên 嗣德十一年).

Before Vietnamese switched from a Chinese-based script to a Latin-based script, Vietnamese had used the traditional Chinese system of classifying tones. Using this system, Vietnamese has 8 tones, but modern linguists only count 6 phonemic tones.

Vietnamese tones were classified into two main groups, bằng (平; 'level tones') and trắc (仄; 'sharp tones'). Some tones such as ngang belong to the bằng group, while others such as ngã belong to the trắc group. Then, these tones were further divided in several other categories: bình (平; 'even'), thượng (上; 'rising'), khứ (去; 'departing'), and nhập (入; 'entering').

Sắc and nặng are counted twice in the system, once in khứ (去; 'departing') and again in nhập (入; 'entering'). The reason for the extra two tones is that syllables ending in the stops /p/, /t/, /c/ and /k/ are treated as having entering tones, but phonetically they are exactly the same.

The tones in the old classification were called Âm bình 陰平 (ngang), Dương bình 陽平 (huyền), Âm thượng 陰上 (hỏi), Dương thượng 陽上 (ngã), Âm khứ 陰去 (sắc; for words that do not end in /p/, /t/, /c/ and /k/), Dương khứ 陽去 (nặng; for words that do not end in /p/, /t/, /c/ and /k/), Âm nhập 陰入 (sắc; for words that do end in /p/, /t/, /c/ and /k/), and Dương nhập 陽入 (nặng; for words that do end in /p/, /t/, /c/ and /k/).

Traditional tone category		Traditional tone name	Modern tone name	Example
bằng 平 'level'	bình 平 'even'	Âm bình 陰平	ngang	ma 'ghost'
bằng 平 'level'	bình 平 'even'	Dương bình 陽平	huyền	mà 'but'
trắc 仄 'sharp'	thượng 上 'rising'	Âm thượng 陰上	hỏi	rể 'son-in-law; groom'
trắc 仄 'sharp'	thượng 上 'rising'	Dương thượng 陽上	ngã	rễ 'root'
trắc 仄 'sharp'	khứ 去 'departing'	Âm khứ 陰去	sắc	lá 'leaf'
trắc 仄 'sharp'	khứ 去 'departing'	Dương khứ 陽去	nặng	lạ 'strange'
trắc 仄 'sharp'	nhập 入 'entering'	Âm nhập 陰入	sắc	mắt 'eye'
trắc 仄 'sharp'	nhập 入 'entering'	Dương nhập 陽入	nặng	mặt 'face'

== Grammar ==
Vietnamese, like Thai and many languages in Southeast Asia, is an analytic language. Vietnamese does not use morphological marking of case, gender, number or tense (and, as a result, has no finite/nonfinite distinction). (Note: Comparison note: As such its grammar relies on word order and sentence structure rather than morphology (in which word changes through inflection). Whereas European languages tend to use morphology to express tense, Vietnamese uses grammatical particles or syntactic constructions.) Also like other languages in the region, Vietnamese syntax conforms to subject–verb–object word order, is head-initial (displaying modified-modifier ordering), and has a noun classifier system. The topic–comment structure is also prevalent in Vietnamese. Additionally, it is pro-drop, wh-in-situ, and allows verb serialization.

Some Vietnamese sentences with English word glosses and translations are provided below.

Minh là {giáo viên}
Minh BE teacher.
"Minh is a teacher."

Trí 13 tuổi
Trí 13 age
"Trí is 13 years old,"

Mai {có vẻ} là {sinh viên} hoặc {học sinh}.
Mai seem BE {student (college)} or {student (under-college)}
"Mai seems to be a college or high school student."

Tài đang nói.
Tài PRES.CONT talk
"Tài is talking."

Giáp rất cao.
Giáp INT tall
"Giáp is very tall."

Người đó là anh của nó.
person that.DET BE {older brother} POSS 3.PRO
"That person is his/her brother."

Con chó này chẳng {bao giờ} sủa cả.
CL dog DET NEG ever bark all
"This dog never barks at all."

Nó chỉ ăn cơm {Việt Nam} thôi.
3.PRO just eat rice.FAM Vietnam only
"He/she/it only eats Vietnamese rice (or food, especially spoken by the elderly)."

Tôi thích con ngựa đen.
1.PRO like CL horse black
"I like the black horse."

Tôi thích cái con ngựa đen đó.
1.PRO like FOC CL horse black DET
"I like that black horse."

Hãy {ở lại} đây ít phút {cho tới} khi tôi quay lại.
HORT stay here few minute until when 1.PRO turn again
"Please stay here for a few minutes until I return."

== Lexicon ==
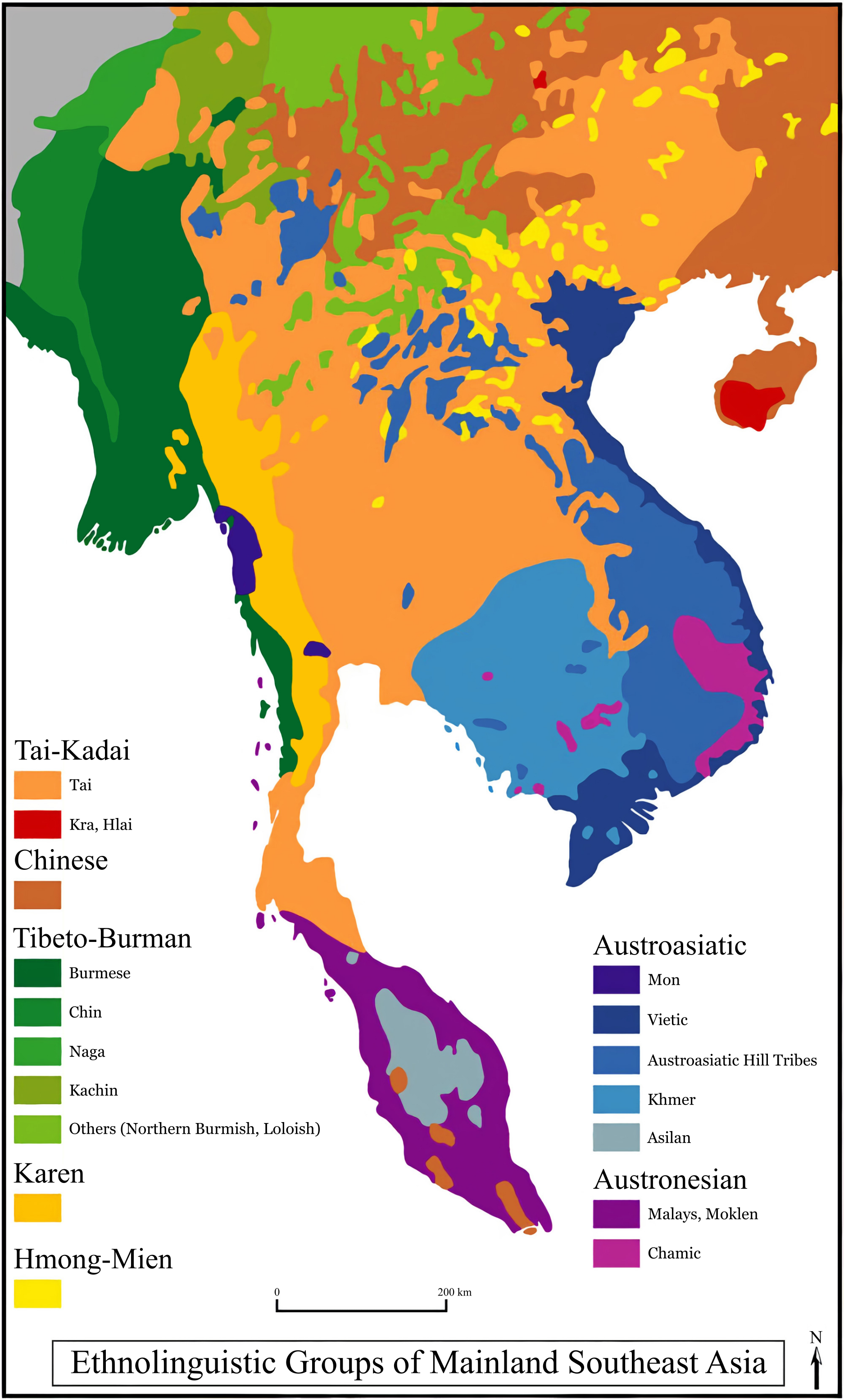
Ethnolinguistic Groups of Mainland Southeast Asia

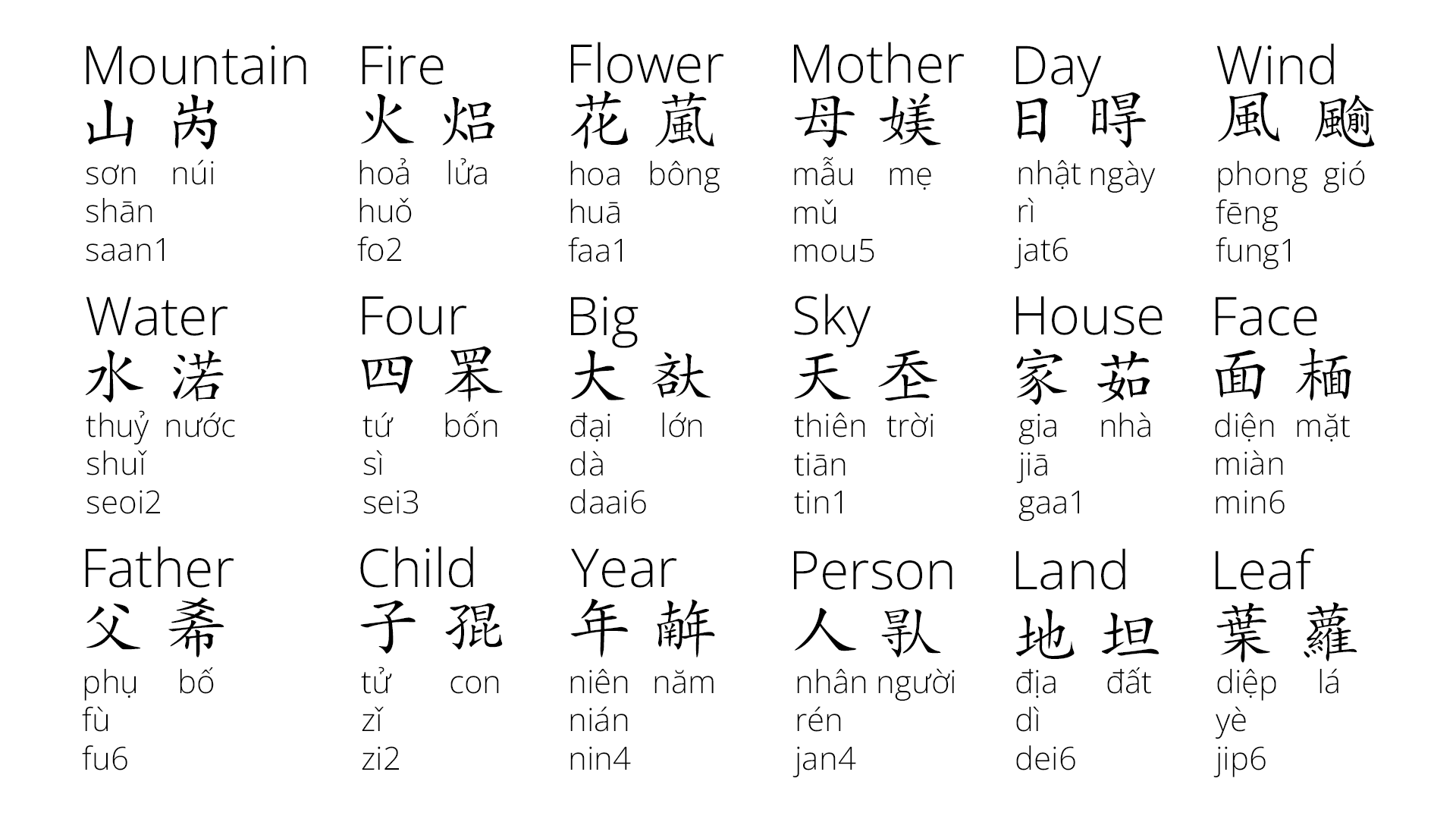
A comparison between Sino-Vietnamese (left) vocabulary with Mandarin and Cantonese pronunciations below and native Vietnamese vocabulary (right).

=== Austroasiatic origins ===
Many early studies hypothesized Vietnamese language-origins to have been either Kra-Dai, Sino-Tibetan, or Austroasiatic. Austroasiatic origins are so far the most tenable to date, with some of the oldest words in Vietnamese being Austroasiatic in origin. Vietnamese shares a large amount of vocabulary with the Mường languages, a close relative of the Vietnamese language.

Basic lexemes in Vietnamese, Mường, May and Munda
English	Vietnamese	Mường	May	Munda	Proto-Vietic
one	một	mốch, môch	muc	mɨy (Sora)	*moːc
two	hai	hal	haːl	bar (Santali)	*haːr
three	ba	pa	pa	pe (Santali)	*pa
four	bốn	pổn	pon	pon (Santali)	*poːnʔ
five	năm	đằm, đăm	dăm	mɔ̃ɽɛ̃ (Santali)	*ɗam
six	sáu	khảu	plǎų	tuɾui (Korku)	*p-ruːʔ
seven	bảy	páy	pǎi	ei (Korku)	*pəs
eight	tám	thảm	tʰam	tʰam (Sora)	*saːmʔ
nine	chín	chỉn	cin	tin (Sora)	*ciːnʔ
ten	mười/chục	mườl	mal/cuk	gel (Sora)	*maːl/*ɟuːk
you	mày	mi	ʔami	amən (Sora)	*miː
rain	mưa	mưa	kuma̤	gama (Mundari)	*k-ma
wind	gió	xỏ	kuzɔ	hɔjɔ (Mundari)	*k-jɔːʔ ~ *kʰjɔːʔ
mountain	núi	khũ	ɓlu	bɘru (Sora)	*b-ruːʔː
young	non	non	kunɔn	kɔnɔn (Kharia)	*k-nɔːn
water	nác > nước	đác	dak	daʔa (Sora)	*ɗaːk
cold	lạnh	lẽnh	tabat/l͎uɓat	raŋga (Kharia)	*nl͎eŋ
smoke	mù/khói	mù/khỏi	hako	poro (Sora)	*ɓɔːjʔ
leaf	lá	lả	ʔula	ola (Sora)	*s-laːʔ
rice	gạo	cảo	tako	caole (Santali)	*r-koːʔ
meat	ñśic > thịt	thit	cit	sissid (Sora)	*-siːt
fish	cá	cả	ʔaka	hako (Santali)	*ʔa-kaːʔ
rat	chuột	chuột	kune	gubu (Bonda)	*k-ɟɔːt
pig	cúi	củi	kul	sukri (Santali)	*kuːrʔ
fly (n.)	ruồi	ròi	muɽɔi̯	aroi (Sora)	*m-rɔːj
hold	cầm	cầm	kadap	kum-si (Sora)	*nkɘm
yawn	ngáp	ngáp	puŋoh	aŋgɔ'b (Santali)	*s-ŋaːp
to stab	chọc	choc	catʔ	suj (Sora)	*ncuk(i)
steal	trộm (đồ)	lỗm	lom	kombro (Santali)	*t.luːmʔ

Other compound words, such as nước non (chữ Nôm: 渃𡽫; "country/nation", lit. "water and mountains"), appear to be of purely Vietnamese origin and used to be inscribed in chữ Nôm characters (compounded, self-coined Chinese characters) but are now written in the Vietnamese alphabet.

=== Chinese contact ===
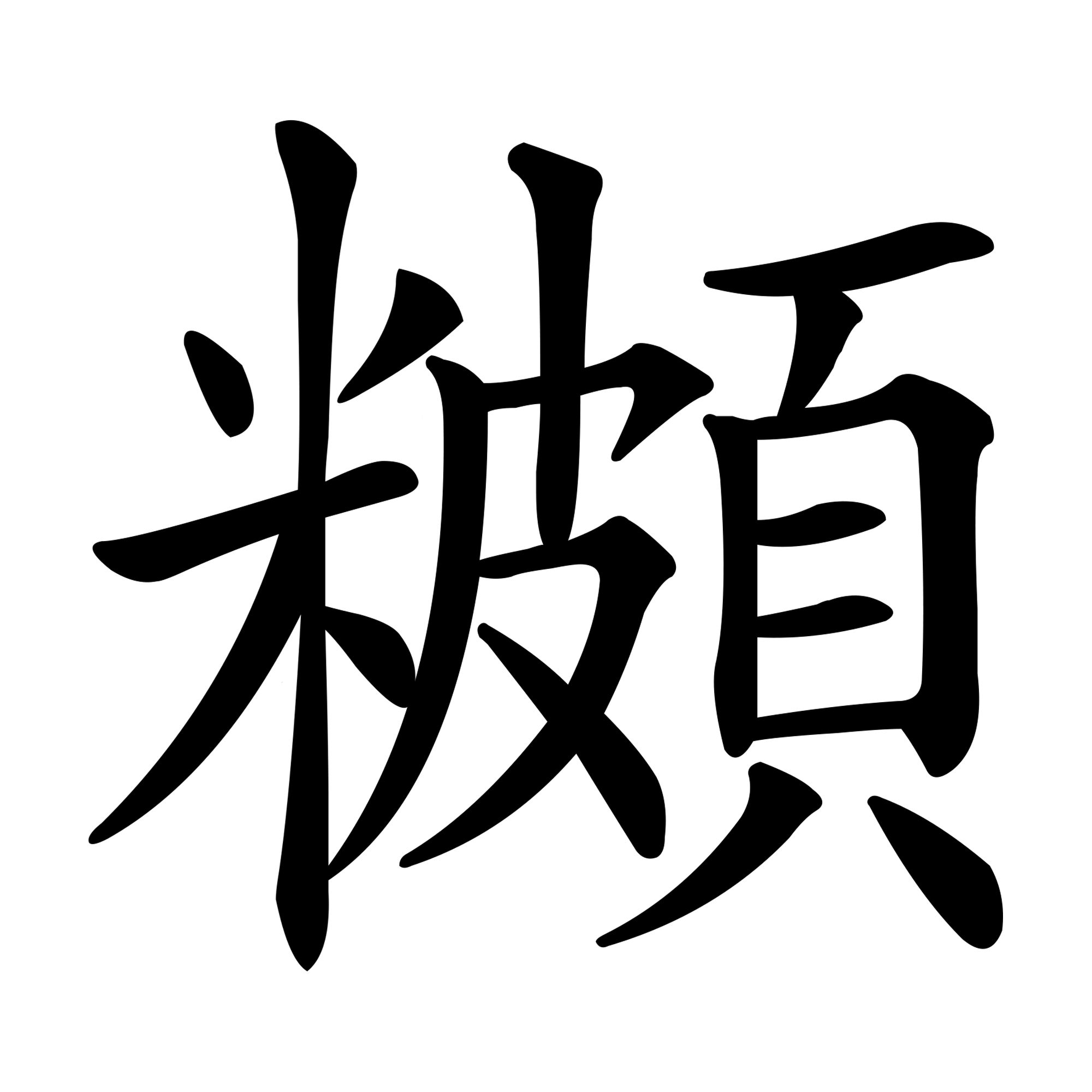
Old Nôm character for rice noodle soup "phở". The character 米 on the left means "rice" whilst the character on the right "頗" was used to indicate the sound of the word (phở).

Although Vietnamese roots are classified as Austroasiatic, Vietic, and Viet-Mường, language contact with Chinese heavily influenced the Vietnamese language, causing it to diverge from Viet-Mường around the 10th to 11th century and become Modern Vietnamese. For instance, the Vietnamese word quản lý, meaning "management" (noun) or "manage" (verb), likely descended from the same word as guǎnlǐ (管理) in Chinese (also kanri (管理, かんり) in Japanese and gwalli (gwan+ri; Korean: 관리; Hanja: 管理) in Korean). Instances of Chinese contact include the historical Nam Việt (aka Nanyue) as well as other periods of influence. Besides English and French, which have made some contributions to the Vietnamese language, Japanese loanwords into Vietnamese are also a more recently studied phenomenon.

Modern linguists describe modern Vietnamese having lost many Proto-Austroasiatic phonological and morphological features that original Vietnamese had. The Chinese influence on Vietnamese corresponds to various periods when Vietnam was under Chinese rule and subsequent influence after Vietnam became independent. Early linguists thought that this meant the Vietnamese lexicon had only two influxes of Chinese words, one stemming from the period under actual Chinese rule and a second from afterwards. These words are grouped together as Sino-Vietnamese vocabulary.

However, according to linguist John Phan, "Annamese Middle Chinese" was already used and spoken in the Red River Valley by the 1st century CE, and its vocabulary significantly fused with the co-existing Proto-Viet-Mường language, the immediate ancestor of Vietnamese. He lists three major classes of Sino-Vietnamese borrowings: Early Sino-Vietnamese (Han dynasty ca. 1st century CE and Jin dynasty ca. 4th century CE), Late Sino-Vietnamese (Tang dynasty), and Recent Sino-Vietnamese (Ming dynasty and afterwards)

=== French era ===
Vietnam became a French protectorate/colonial territory in 1883 (until the Geneva Accords of 1954), which resulted in significant influence from French into the Indochina region (Laos, Cambodia and Vietnam). Examples include:

Cà phê in Vietnamese was derived from the French café (coffee). Yogurt in Vietnamese is sữa chua (lit. 'sour milk'), but it is also calqued from French (yaourt) into Vietnamese (da ua - /j/a ua). Phô mai (cheese) is from the French fromage. Musical note was borrowed into Vietnamese as nốt or nốt nhạc, from the French note de musique. The Vietnamese term for steering wheel is vô lăng, a partial derivation from the French volant directionnel. A necktie (cravate in French) is rendered into Vietnamese as cà vạt.

In addition, modern Vietnamese pronunciations of French names correspond directly to the original French pronunciations (Pa-ri for Paris, Mác-xây for Marseille, Boóc-đô for Bordeaux, etc.), whereas pronunciations of other foreign names (Chinese excluded) are generally derived from English.

=== English ===
Some English words were incorporated into Vietnamese as loan words – such as "TV", borrowed as "tivi" or just TV, but still officially called truyền hình. Some other borrowings are calques, translated into Vietnamese. For example, 'software' is translated into "phần mềm" (literally meaning "soft part"). Some scientific terms, such as "biological cell", were derived from chữ Hán. For example, the word tế bào is 細胞 in chữ Hán, whilst other scientific names such as "acetylcholine" are unaltered. Words like "peptide" may be seen as peptit.

=== Japanese ===
Japanese loanwords are a more recently studied phenomenon, with a paper by Nguyễn & Lê (2020) classifying three waves of Japanese influence – with the first two waves being the principal influxes and the third wave coming from the Vietnamese who studied Japanese. The first wave consisted of Kanji words created by Japanese to represent Western concepts that were not readily available in Chinese or Japanese, where by the end of the 19th century they were imported to other Asian languages. This first influx is called Sino-Vietnamese words of Japanese origins. For example, the Vietnamese term for "association club", câu lạc bộ, which was borrowed from Chinese (俱樂部, pinyin: jùlèbù, jyutping: keoi1 lok6 bou6), and then in turn from Japanese (kanji: 倶楽部, katakana: クラブ, rōmaji: kurabu) which came from the English "club", resulting in indirect borrowing from Japanese.

The second wave was during the brief Japanese occupation of Vietnam from 1940 until 1945. However, Japanese cultural influence in Vietnam started significantly from the 1980s. This newer second wave of Japanese-origin loanwords is distinctive from the Sino-Vietnamese words of Japanese origin in that they were borrowed directly from Japanese. This vocabulary includes words representative of Japanese culture, such as kimono, sumo, samurai, and bonsai from modified Hepburn romanisation. These loanwords are coined as "new Japanese loanwords". A significant number of new Japanese loanwords were also of Chinese origin. Sometimes the same concept can be described using both Sino-Vietnamese words of Japanese origin (first wave) and new Japanese loanwords (second wave). For example, judo can be referred to as both judo and nhu đạo, the Vietnamese reading of 柔道.

=== Modern Chinese influence ===
Some words, such as lạp xưởng from 臘腸 (Chinese sausage), primarily keep to the Cantonese pronunciations, having been brought over by southern Chinese migrants, whereas in Hán-Việt, which has been described as being close to Middle Chinese pronunciation, it is actually pronounced lạp trường. However, the Cantonese term is the better-known name for Chinese sausage in Vietnam. Meanwhile, any new terms calqued from Chinese would be based on the Mandarin pronunciation. Additionally, in the southern provinces of Vietnam, the term xí ngầu can be used to refer to dice, which may have derived from a Cantonese or Teochew idiom, "xập xí, xập ngầu" (十四, 十五, Sino-Vietnamese: thập tứ, thập ngũ), literally "fourteen, fifteen" to mean 'uncertain'.

== Slang ==
Vietnamese slang (tiếng lóng) has changed over time. Vietnamese slang consists of pure Vietnamese words as well as words borrowed from other languages such as Mandarin or Indo-European languages. It is estimated that Vietnamese slang originating from Mandarin accounts for a tiny proportion (4.6% of surveyed data in newspapers). On the other hand, slang originating from Indo-European languages accounts for a more significant proportion (12%) and is much more common in today's usage. Slang borrowed from these languages can be either transliteral or vernacular. Some examples:

Word	IPA	Description
Ex	/ɛk̚/, /ejk̚/	a word borrowed from English used to describe an ex-lover, usually pronounced similarly to ếch ("frog"). This is an example of vernacular slang.
Sô	/ʂoː/	a word derived from the English word "show" which has the same meaning, usually paired with the word chạy ("to run") to make the phrase chạy sô, which translates in English to "running shows", but its everyday use has the same connotation as "having to do a lot of tasks within a short amount of time". This is an example of transliteral slang.

With the rise of the Internet, new slang is generated and popularized through social media. This modern slang is commonly used in the younger generation's teenspeak in Vietnam. This recent slang is mostly pure Vietnamese, and almost all the words are homonyms or some form of wordplay. Some slang words may include profanity swear words (derogatory) or just a play on words.

Some examples with newer and older slang that originate from northern, central, or southern Vietnamese dialects include:

Word	IPA	Description
vãi	/vǎːj/	"Vãi" (predominately from northern Vietnamese) is a profanity word that can be a noun or a verb depending on the context. It refers to a female Buddhist temple-goer in its noun form and to "spilling something over" in its verb form. In slang terms, it is commonly used to emphasize an adjective or a verb – for example, ngon vãi ("very delicious"), sợ vãi ("very scary"). Similar uses to the expletive bloody.
trẻ trâu	/ʈɛ̌ːʈəw/	A noun whose literal translation is "buffalo kid". It is usually used to describe younger children or others who behave like perceived stereotypes of children, like putting on airs and acting foolishly to attract other people's attention (with negative actions, words, and thoughts).
gấu	/ɣə̆́w/	A noun meaning "bear". It is also commonly used to refer to someone's lover.
gà	/ɣàː/	A noun meaning "chicken". It is also commonly used to refer to someone's lack of ability to complete or compete in a task.
cá sấu	/káːʂə́w/	A noun meaning "crocodile". It is also commonly used to refer to someone's lack of beauty. The word sấu can be pronounced similarly to xấu (ugly).
thả thính	/tʰǎːtʰíŋ̟/	A verb used to describe the action of dropping roasted bran as bait for fish. Nowadays it is also used to describe the act of dropping hints to another person one is attracted to.
nha (and other variants)	/ɲaː/	Similar to other particles (nhé, nghe, nhỉ, nhá), it can be used to end sentences. "Rửa chén, nhỉ" can mean "Wash the dishes... yeah?"
dô (South) and dzô or zô (North)	/zo:/, /jow/	Eye dialect of the word vô, meaning "in". Slogans when drinking at parties. Usually people in the south of Vietnam will pronounce it as "dô", but people in the north pronounce it as "dzô". The letter "z", which is not usually present in the Vietnamese alphabet, can be used for emphasis or for slang terms.
lu bu, lu xu bu	/lu: bu:/, /lu: su: bu:/	"Lu bu" (from southern Vietnamese) meaning busy. "Lu xu bu" meaning so busy at a particular task or activity that the person cannot do much else – e.g., quá lu bu (so busy).

Whilst older slang has been used by previous generations, the prevalence of modern slang used by young people in Vietnam (as teenspeak) has made conversations more difficult for older generations to understand. This has become subject for debate. Some believe that incorporating teenspeak or internet slang in daily conversation among teenagers will affect the formality and cadence of their general speech. Others argue that it is not slang that is the problem, but rather the lack of communication techniques for the instant internet messaging era. They believe slang should not be dismissed, but instead, youth should be adequately informed to recognise when to use it and when it is inappropriate.

== Writing systems ==
The first two lines of the classic Vietnamese epic poem The Tale of Kiều, written in the Nôm script and the modern Vietnamese alphabet. Chinese characters representing Sino-Vietnamese words are shown in green, characters borrowed for similar-sounding native Vietnamese words in purple, and invented characters in brown.

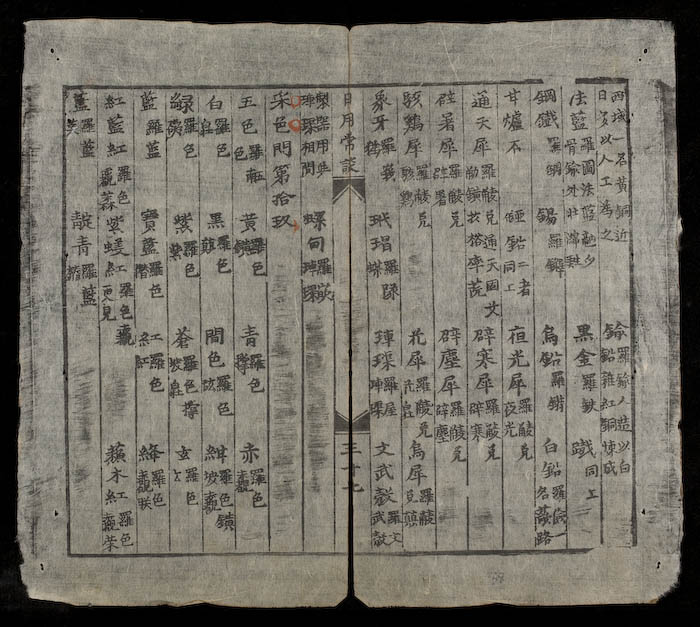
In the bilingual dictionary Nhật dụng thường đàm (1851), Chinese characters (chữ Nho) are explained in chữ Nôm.

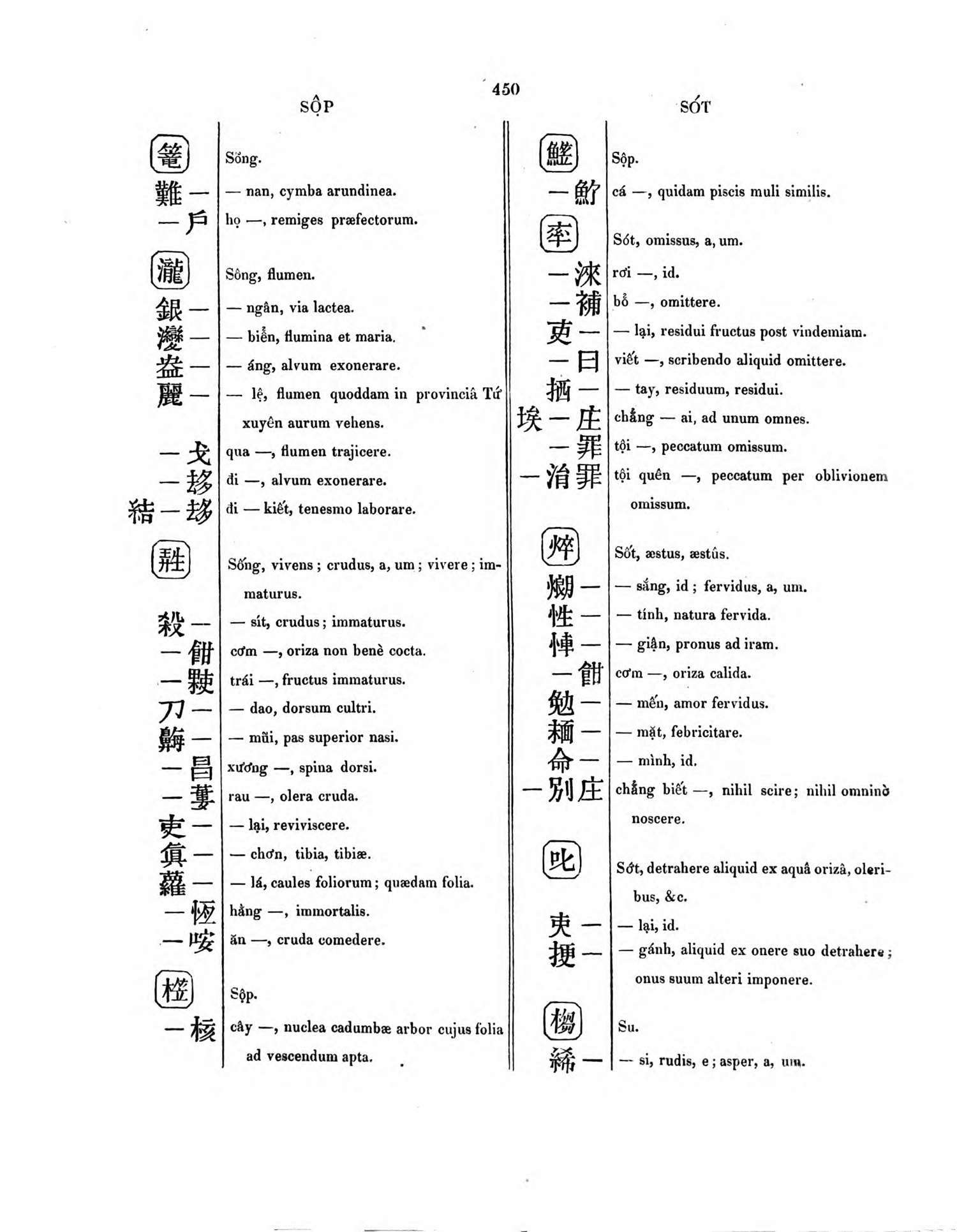
Jean-Louis Taberd's dictionary Dictionarium anamitico-latinum (1838) represents Vietnamese (then Annamese) words in the Latin alphabet and chữ Nôm.

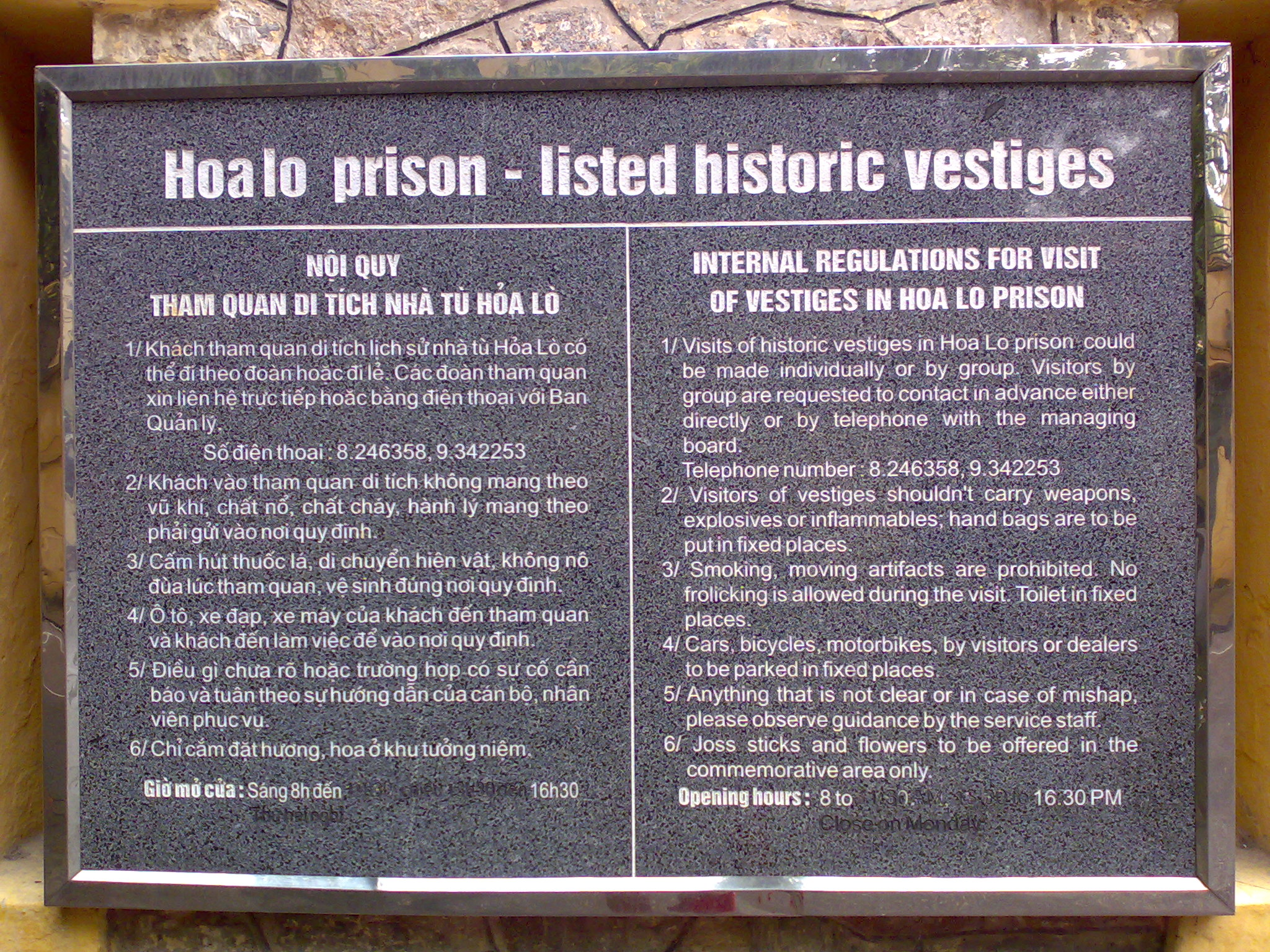
A sign at the Hỏa Lò Prison museum in Hanoi lists rules for visitors in both Vietnamese and English.

After ending a millennium of Chinese rule in 939, the Vietnamese state adopted Literary Chinese (called văn ngôn 文言 or Hán văn 漢文 in Vietnamese) for official purposes. Up to the late 19th century (except for two brief interludes), all formal writing, including government business, scholarship and formal literature, was done in Literary Chinese, written with Chinese characters (chữ Hán). Although the writing system is now mostly in chữ Quốc ngữ (Latin script), Chinese script known as chữ Hán in Vietnamese as well as chữ Nôm (together, Hán-Nôm) is still present in such activities as Vietnamese calligraphy.

=== Chữ Nôm ===
From around the 13th century, Vietnamese scholars used their knowledge of the Chinese script to develop the chữ Nôm (lit. 'Southern characters') script to record folk literature in Vietnamese. The script used Chinese characters to represent both borrowed Sino-Vietnamese vocabulary and native words with similar pronunciation or meaning. In addition, thousands of new compound characters were created to write Vietnamese words using a variety of methods, including phono-semantic compounds. For example, in the opening lines of the classic poem The Tale of Kiều,

- the Sino-Vietnamese word mệnh 'destiny' was written with its original character 命;
- the native Vietnamese word ta 'our' was written with the character 些 of the homophonous Sino-Vietnamese word ta 'little, few; rather, somewhat';
- the native Vietnamese word năm 'year' was written with a new character 𢆥 that is compounded from 南 nam and 年 'year'.

The oldest example of an early form of the Nôm is found in a list of names in the Tháp Miếu Temple Inscription, dating from the early 13th century AD. Nôm writing reached its zenith in the 18th century when many Vietnamese writers and poets composed their works in Nôm, most notably Nguyễn Du and Hồ Xuân Hương (dubbed "the Queen of Nôm poetry"). However, it was only used for official purposes during the brief Hồ and Tây Sơn dynasties (1400–1406 and 1778–1802 respectively).

A Vietnamese Catholic, Nguyễn Trường Tộ, unsuccessfully petitioned the Court suggesting the adoption of a script for Vietnamese based on Chinese characters.

=== Vietnamese alphabet ===
A romanisation of Vietnamese was codified in the 17th century by the Avignonese Jesuit missionary Alexandre de Rhodes (1591–1660), based on works of earlier Portuguese missionaries, particularly Francisco de Pina, Gaspar do Amaral and Antonio Barbosa. It reflects a "Middle Vietnamese" dialect close to the Hanoi variety as spoken in the 17th century. Its vowels and final consonants correspond most closely to northern dialects while its initial consonants are most similar to southern dialects. (This is not unlike how English orthography is based on the Chancery Standard of Late Middle English, with many spellings retained even after the Great Vowel Shift.)

The Vietnamese alphabet contains 29 letters, supplementing the Latin alphabet with an additional consonant letter (đ) and 6 additional vowel letters (ă, â/ê/ô, ơ, ư) formed with diacritics. The Latin letters f, j, w and z are not used. The script also represents additional phonemes using ten digraphs (ch, gh, gi, kh, ng, nh, ph, qu, th, and tr) and a single trigraph (ngh). Further diacritics are used to indicate the tone of each syllable:

Diacritic	Vietnamese name and meaning
(no mark)	ngang 'level'
◌̀ (grave accent)	huyền 'deep'
◌́ (acute accent)	sắc 'sharp'
◌̉ (hook above)	hỏi 'questioning'
◌̃ (tilde)	ngã 'tumbling'
◌̣ (dot below)	nặng 'heavy'

Thus, it is possible for diacritics to be stacked e.g. ể, combining letter with diacritic, ê, with diacritic for tone, ẻ, to make ể.

Despite the missionaries' creation of the alphabetic script, chữ Nôm remained the dominant script in Vietnamese Catholic literature for more than 200 years. Starting from the late 19th century, the Vietnamese alphabet (chữ Quốc ngữ or 'national language script') gradually expanded from its initial usage in Christian writing to become more popular among the general public.

The romanised script became predominant over the course of the early 20th century, when education became widespread and a simpler writing system was found to be more expedient for teaching and communication with the general population. The French colonial administration sought to eliminate Chinese writing, Confucianism, and other Chinese influences from Vietnam. French superseded Literary Chinese in administration. Vietnamese written with the alphabet became required for all public documents in 1910 by issue of a decree by the French Résident Supérieur of the protectorate of Tonkin. In turn, Vietnamese reformists and nationalists themselves encouraged and popularized the use of chữ Quốc ngữ. By the middle of the 20th century, most writing was done in chữ Quốc ngữ, which became the official script on independence.

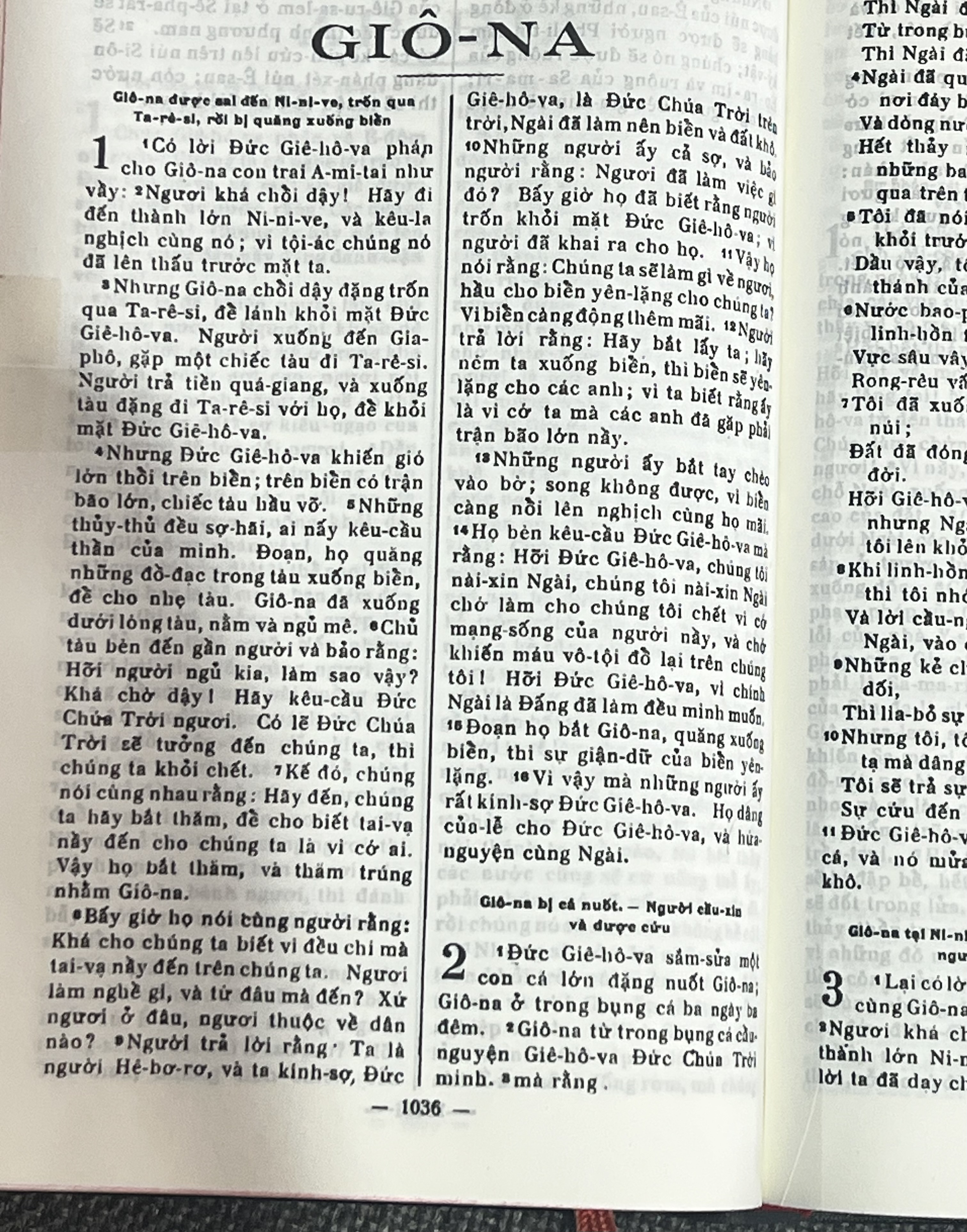
An excerpt of the Book of Jonah in Vietnamese.

Nevertheless, chữ Hán was still in use during the French colonial period and as late as World War II was still featured on banknotes, but fell out of official and mainstream use shortly thereafter. The education reform by North Vietnam in 1950 eliminated the use of chữ Hán and chữ Nôm. Today, only a few scholars and some extremely elderly people are able to read chữ Nôm or use it in Vietnamese calligraphy. Priests of the Jing minority in China (descendants of 16th-century migrants from Vietnam) use songbooks and scriptures written in chữ Nôm in their ceremonies.

=== Computer support ===
The Unicode character set contains all Vietnamese characters and the Vietnamese currency symbol. On systems that do not support Unicode, many 8-bit Vietnamese code pages are available such as Vietnamese Standard Code for Information Interchange (VSCII) or Windows-1258. Where ASCII must be used, Vietnamese letters are often typed using the VIQR convention, though this is largely unnecessary with the increasing ubiquity of Unicode. There are many software tools that help type Roman-script Vietnamese on English keyboards, such as WinVNKey and Unikey on Windows, or MacVNKey on Macintosh, with popular methods of encoding Vietnamese using Telex, VNI or VIQR input methods all included. Telex input method is often set as the default for many devices. Besides third-party software tools, operating systems such as Windows or macOS can also be installed with Vietnamese and Vietnamese keyboard, e.g. Vietnamese Telex in Microsoft Windows.

=== Dates and numbers writing formats ===
Tiếng Việt speak date in the format "day month year". Each month's name is just the ordinal of that month appended after the word tháng, which means "month". Traditional Vietnamese, however, assigns other names to some months; these names are mostly used in the lunar calendar and in poetry.

English month name	Vietnamese month name	
English month name	Gregorian calendar	Traditional lunar calendar
January	Tháng một (1)	Tháng giêng
February	Tháng hai (2)	
March	Tháng ba (3)	
April	Tháng tư (4)	
May	Tháng năm (5)	
June	Tháng sáu (6)	
July	Tháng bảy (7)	
August	Tháng tám (8)	
September	Tháng chín (9)	
October	Tháng mười (10)	
November	Tháng mười một (11)	Tháng một
December	Tháng mười hai (12)	Tháng chạp

When written in the short form, "DD/MM/YYYY" is preferred.

Example:

- English: 2(nd) September, 2025
- Vietnamese long form: Ngày hai Tháng chín Năm hai nghìn không trăm hai mươi lăm
- Vietnamese short form: 2 September 2025

The Vietnamese prefer writing numbers with a comma as the decimal separator in lieu of dots, and either spaces or dots to group the digits. An example is 1 629,15 (one thousand six hundred twenty-nine-point one five). Because a comma is used as the decimal separator, a semicolon is used to separate two numbers instead.

== Literature ==
The Tale of Kiều is an epic narrative poem by the celebrated poet Nguyễn Du, ( 阮攸), which is often considered the most significant work of Vietnamese literature. It was originally written in chữ Nôm (titled Đoạn Trường Tân Thanh 斷腸新聲) and is widely taught in Vietnam (in chữ Quốc ngữ transliteration).

== Language variation ==
Currently the Nguồn language is considered by the Vietnamese government to be a dialect of Vietnamese, however it is also considered a separate Việt-Mường language or the southernmost dialect of Mường language. The Vietnamese language also has several mutually intelligible regional varieties: (Note: Sources on Vietnamese variation include: Alves (forthcoming), Alves & Nguyễn (2007), Emeneau (1947), Hoàng (1989), Honda (2006), Nguyễn, Đ.-H. (1995), Pham (2005), Thompson (1991[1965]), Vũ (1982), Vương (1981).)

Dialect region	Localities
Northern Vietnamese dialects	Northern Vietnam
Thanh Hóa dialect	Thanh Hoá
Central Vietnamese dialects	Nghệ An, Hà Tĩnh, Quảng Bình, Quảng Trị
Huế dialect	Huế
Southern Vietnamese dialects	South Central Coast, Central Highlands and Southern Vietnam

Vietnamese has traditionally been divided into three dialect regions: North (45%), Central (10%), and South (45%). Michel Ferlus and Nguyễn Tài Cẩn found that there was a separate North-Central dialect for Vietnamese as well. The term Haut-Annam refers to dialects spoken from the northern Nghệ An Province to the southern (former) Thừa Thiên Province that preserve archaic features (like consonant clusters and undiphthongized vowels) that have been lost in other modern dialects.

The dialect regions differ mostly in their sound systems (see below) but also in vocabulary (including basic and non-basic vocabulary) and grammar. (Note: Some differences in grammatical words are noted in Vietnamese grammar: Demonstratives, Vietnamese grammar: Pronouns.) The North-Central and the Central regional varieties, which have a significant number of vocabulary differences, are generally less mutually intelligible to Northern and Southern speakers. There is less internal variation within the Southern region than the other regions because of its relatively late settlement by Vietnamese-speakers (around the end of the 15th century). The North-Central region is particularly conservative since its pronunciation has diverged less from Vietnamese orthography than the other varieties, which tend to merge certain sounds. Along the coastal areas, regional variation has been neutralized to a certain extent, but more mountainous regions preserve more variation. As for sociolinguistic attitudes, the North-Central varieties are often felt to be "peculiar" or "difficult to understand" by speakers of other dialects although their pronunciation fits the written language the most closely; that is typically because of various words in their vocabulary that are unfamiliar to other speakers (see the example vocabulary table below).

The first article of the Universal Declaration of Human Rights
The first article of the Universal Declaration of Human Rights spoken by Nghiem Mai Phuong, native speaker of a northern variety.

The large movements of people between North and South since the mid-20th century has resulted in a sizable number of Southern residents with a somewhat Northern accent. Following the 1954 partition of Vietnam, about a million Northerners, mainly from the Red River Delta, moved south, primarily to Saigon and in large numbers to Biên Hòa, Vũng Tàu, and the surrounding areas as part of Operation Passage to Freedom. About 150,000 moved in the reverse direction (Tập kết ra Bắc, literally 'regroup to the North').

After the Fall of Saigon in 1975, Northern and North-Central speakers from the densely populated Red River Delta and the traditionally-poorer provinces of Nghệ An, Hà Tĩnh, and Quảng Bình have continued to move south to look for better economic opportunities allowed by the new government's New Economic Zones, a program that lasted from 1975 to 1985. The first half of the program (1975–1980) resulted in 1.3 million people sent to the New Economic Zones (NEZs), most of which were relocated to the southern half of the country in previously uninhabited areas, and 550,000 of them were Northerners. The second half (1981–1985) saw almost 1 million Northerners relocated to the New Economic Zones. Government and military personnel from Northern and North-Central Vietnam are also posted to various locations throughout the country that were often away from their home regions. More recently, the growth of the free market system has resulted in increased interregional movement and relations between distant parts of Vietnam through business and travel. The movements have also resulted in some blending of dialects and more significantly have made the Northern dialect more easily understood in the South and vice versa. Most Southerners, when singing modern/old popular Vietnamese songs or addressing the public, do so in the standardized accent if possible, which uses the Northern pronunciation. That is true in both Vietnam and overseas Vietnamese communities.

Modern Standard Vietnamese is based on the Hanoi dialect. Nevertheless, the major dialects are still predominant in their respective areas and have also evolved over time with influences from other areas. Historically, accents have been distinguished by how each region pronounces the letters d ([z] in the Northern dialect and [j] in the Central and Southern dialect) and r ([z] in the Northern dialect and [r] in the Central and Southern dialects). Thus, the Central and the Southern dialects can be said to have retained a pronunciation closer to Vietnamese orthography and resemble how Middle Vietnamese sounded, in contrast to the modern Northern (Hanoi) dialect, which has since undergone pronunciation shifts.

=== Vocabulary ===
Regional variation in vocabulary
Northern	Central	Southern	English gloss
vâng	dạ	dạ	"yes"
này	ni, nì	nè	"this"
thế này, như này	như ri, a ri	như vầy	"thus, this way"
đấy	nớ, tê	đó	"that"
thế, thế ấy, thế đấy	rứa, rứa tê	vậy, vậy đó	"thus, so, that way"
kia, kìa	tê, tề	đó	"that yonder"
đâu	mô	đâu	"where"
nào	mồ	nào	"which"
tại sao, làm sao	răng	tại sao	"why"
thế nào, như nào	răng, mần răng	làm sao	"how"
tôi, tui	tui	tui	"I, me (polite)"
tao	tau	tao	"I, me (informal, familiar)"
chúng tao, bọn tao, chúng tôi, bọn tôi	choa, bọn choa	tụi tao, tụi tui, bọn tui	"we, us (but not you, colloquial, familiar)"
mày	mi	mày	"you (informal, familiar)"
chúng mày, bọn mày	bây, bọn bây	tụi mầy, tụi bây, bọn mày	"you guys (informal, familiar)"
nó	hắn, hấn	nó	"he/she/it (informal, familiar)"
chúng nó, bọn nó	bọn nớ	tụi nó	"they/them (informal, familiar)"
ông ấy	ông nớ	ổng	"he/him, that gentleman, sir"
bà ấy	bà nớ	bả	"she/her, that lady, madam"
anh ấy	anh nớ	ảnh	"he/him, that young man (of equal status)"
ruộng	nương	ruộng, rẫy	"field"
bát	đọi	chén, tô	"bowl"
muôi, môi	môi	vá	"ladle"
đầu	trốc	đầu	"head"
ô tô	ô tô	xe hơi (ô tô)	"car"
thìa	thìa	muỗng	"spoon"
đĩa	dĩa	dĩa	"plate"
dĩa	nĩa	nĩa	"fork"

Although regional variations developed over time, most of those words can be used interchangeably and be understood well, albeit with more or less frequency then others or with slightly different but often discernible word choices and pronunciations. Some accents may mix, with words such dạ vâng combining dạ and vâng, being created.

=== Consonants ===
The syllable-initial ch and tr digraphs are pronounced distinctly in the North-Central, Central, and Southern varieties but are merged in Northern varieties, which pronounce them the same way. Many North-Central varieties preserve three distinct pronunciations for d, gi, and r, but the Northern varieties have a three-way merger, and the Central and the Southern varieties have a merger of d and gi but keep r distinct. At the end of syllables, the palatals ch and nh have merged with the alveolars t and n, which, in turn, have also partially merged with velars c and ng in the Central and the Southern varieties.

Regional consonant correspondences
Syllable position	Orthography	Northern	North-central	Central	Southern
syllable-initial	x	[s]	[s]		
syllable-initial	s	[s]	[ʂ]		[s, ʂ] (Note: In southern dialects, ch and tr are increasingly being merged as [c]. Similarly, x and s are increasingly being merged as [s].)
syllable-initial	ch	[t͡ɕ]	[c]		
syllable-initial	tr	[t͡ɕ]	[ʈ]		[c, ʈ]
syllable-initial	r	[z]	[r]		
syllable-initial	d	[z]	Varies	[j]	
syllable-initial	gi	[z]	Varies	[j]	
syllable-initial	v	[v]			[v, j] (Note: In the southern dialects, v is increasingly pronounced [v] among educated speakers. Less educated speakers use [j] more consistently throughout their speech.)
syllable-final	t	[t]		[k]	
syllable-final	c	[k]		[k]	
syllable-final	t after i, ê	[t]		[t]	
syllable-final	ch	[k̟]		[t]	
syllable-final	t after u, ô	[t]		[kp]	
syllable-final	c after u, ô, o	[kp]		[kp]	
syllable-final	n	[n]		[ŋ]	
syllable-final	ng	[ŋ]		[ŋ]	
syllable-final	n after i, ê	[n]		[n]	
syllable-final	nh	[ŋ̟]		[n]	
syllable-final	n after u, ô	[n]		[ŋm]	
syllable-final	ng after u, ô, o	[ŋm]		[ŋm]	

In addition to the regional variation described above, there is a merger of l and n in certain rural varieties in the North:

l, n variation
Orthography	"Mainstream" varieties	Rural varieties
n	[n]	[l]
l	[l]	[l]

Variation between l and n can be found even in mainstream Vietnamese in certain words. For example, the numeral "five" appears as năm by itself and in compound numerals like năm mươi "fifty", but it appears as lăm in mười lăm "fifteen" (see Vietnamese grammar#Cardinal). In some northern varieties, the numeral appears with an initial nh instead of l: hai mươi nhăm "twenty-five", instead of the mainstream hai mươi lăm. (Note: Gregerson (1981) notes that the variation was present in de Rhodes's time in some initial consonant clusters: mlẽ ~ mnhẽ "reason" (cf. modern Vietnamese lẽ "reason").)

There is also a merger of r and g in certain rural varieties in the South:

r, g variation
Orthography	"Mainstream" varieties	Rural varieties
r	[r]	[ɣ]
g	[ɣ]	[ɣ]

The consonant clusters that were originally present in Middle Vietnamese (in the 17th century) have been lost in almost all modern Vietnamese varieties although they have been retained in other closely related Vietic languages. However, some speech communities have preserved some of these archaic clusters: "sky" is blời with a cluster in Hảo Nho (Yên Mô, Ninh Bình Province) but trời in Southern Vietnamese and giời in Hanoi Vietnamese (initial single consonants /ʈ/, /z/, respectively).

=== Tones ===
There are six tones in Vietnamese, with phonetic differences between dialects, mostly in the pitch contour and phonation type.

Regional tone correspondences
Tone	Northern	North-central			Central	Southern
Tone	Northern	Vinh	Thanh Chương	Hà Tĩnh	Central	Southern
ngang	˧ 33	˧˥ 35	˧˥ 35	˧˥ 35, ˧˥˧ 353	˧˥ 35	˧ 33
huyền	˨˩̤ 21̤	˧ 33	˧ 33	˧ 33	˧ 33	˨˩ 21
sắc	˧˥ 35	˩ 11	˩ 11, ˩˧̰ 13̰	˩˧̰ 13̰	˩˧̰ 13̰	˧˥ 35
hỏi	˧˩˧̰ 31̰3	˧˩ 31	˧˩ 31	˧˩̰ʔ 31̰ʔ	˧˩˨ 312	˨˩˦ 214
ngã	˧ʔ˥ 3ʔ5	˩˧̰ 13̰	˧˩ 31	˨̰ 22̰	˧˩˨ 312	˨˩˦ 214
nặng	˨˩̰ʔ 21̰ʔ	˨ 22	˨̰ 22̰	˨̰ 22̰	˨̰ 22̰	˨˩˨ 212

The table above shows the pitch contour of each tone using Chao tone number notation in which 1 represents the lowest pitch, and 5 the highest; glottalization (creaky, stiff, harsh) is indicated with the ⟨◌̰⟩ symbol; murmured voice with ⟨◌̤⟩; glottal stop with ⟨ʔ⟩; sub-dialectal variants are separated with commas. (See also the tone section below.)

== Word play ==
A basic form of word play in Vietnamese called nối từ involves disyllabic words in which the last syllable forms the first syllable of the next word in the chain. This game involves two members versing each other until the opponent is unable to think of another word. For instance:

Hậu trường (backstage)	→	Trường học (School)	→	Học tập (Study)	→	Tập trung (Concentrate)	→
Trung tâm (Centre)	→	Tâm lí (Mentality)	→	Lí do (Reason)	→	Etc., until someone cannot form the next word or, if the word play is used as a game, gives up.	

Another language game known as nói lái is used by Vietnamese speakers. Nói lái involves switching, adding or removing the tones in a pair of words and may also involve switching the order of words or the first consonant and the rime of each word. Some examples:

Original phrase		Phrase after nói lái transformation	Structural change
đái dầm "peeing oneself"	→	dấm đài (lit. 'vinegar stage')	word order and tone switch
chửa hoang "pregnancy out of wedlock"	→	hoảng chưa "scared yet?"	word order and tone switch
bầy tôi "all the king's subjects"	→	bồi tây "waiter (of Western origin)"	initial consonant, rime, and tone switch
bí mật "secrets"	→	bật mí "reveal secrets"	initial consonant and rime switch
Tây Ban Nha "Spain (España)"	→	Tây Bán Nhà (lit. 'west sell house'; mainly used to mock Spain national football team)	initial consonant, rime, and tone switch
Bồ Đào Nha "Portugal"	→	Nhà Đào Bô (lit. 'house dig potty', mainly used to mock Portugal national football team)	word order and tone switch
siêu đẹp trai "super handsome"	→	sai đẹp chiêu or sai đẹp triêu	rime switch

The resulting transformed phrase often has a different meaning but sometimes may just be a nonsensical word pair. Nói lái can be used to obscure the original meaning and thus soften the discussion of a socially sensitive issue, as with dấm đài and hoảng chưa (above), or when implied (and not overtly spoken), to deliver a hidden subtextual message, as with bồi tây. (Note: Nguyễn 1997, p. 29 gives the following context: "... a collaborator under the French administration was presented with a congratulatory panel featuring the two Chinese characters quần thần. This Sino-Vietnamese expression could be defined as bầy tôi meaning 'all the king's subjects'. But those two syllables, when undergoing commutation of rhyme and tone, would generate bồi tây meaning 'servant in a French household'.") Naturally, nói lái can be used for a humorous effect.

Another word game somewhat reminiscent of pig latin is played by children. Here a nonsense syllable (chosen by the child) is prefixed onto a target word's syllables, then their initial consonants and rimes are switched with the tone of the original word remaining on the new switched rime.

Nonsense syllable	Target word		Intermediate form with prefixed syllable		Resulting "secret" word
la	phở "beef or chicken noodle soup"	→	la phở	→	lơ phả
la	ăn "to eat"	→	la ăn	→	lăn a
la	hoàn cảnh "situation"	→	la hoàn la cảnh	→	loan hà lanh cả
chim	hoàn cảnh "situation"	→	chim hoàn chim cảnh	→	choan hìm chanh kỉm

This language game is often used as a "secret" or "coded" language useful for obscuring messages from adult comprehension.

== Sample text ==
Article 1 of the Universal Declaration of Human Rights in Vietnamese:

Mọi con người sinh ra đều tự do và bình đẳng về nhân phẩm và quyền lợi. Họ được tạo hóa ban cho lý trí và lương tâm và phải đối xử với nhau với tinh thần huynh đệ.

Article 1 of the Universal Declaration of Human Rights in Vietnamese, transcribed using the International Phonetic Alphabet:

[moj˧˩ˀ kɔn˧ ŋɯə̯j˨˩ sɪŋ̟˧ za˧ ɗew˨˩ tɯ˧˩ˀ zɔ˧ va˨˩ ɓɪŋ̟˨˩ ɗɐŋ˧˩˧ ve˨˩ ɲʌn˧ fʌm˧˩˧ va˨˩ kwiə̯n˨˩ ləj˧˩ˀ ‖ hɔ˧˩ˀ ɗɯə̯k˧˩ˀ taw˧˩ˀ hwa˧˥ ɓan˧ t͡ɕɔ˧ li˧˥ t͡ɕi˧˥ va˨˩ lɯə̯ŋ˧ tʌm˧ va˨˩ faj˧˩˧ ɗoj˧ sɯ˧˩˧ vəj˧˥ ɲaw˧ vəj˧˥ tɪŋ̟˧ tʰan˨˩ hwɪŋ̟˧ ɗe˧˩ˀ]

Article 1 of the Universal Declaration of Human Rights in English:

All human beings are born free and equal in dignity and rights. They are endowed with reason and conscience and should act towards one another in a spirit of brotherhood.

== See also ==
- Vietnamese Wikipedia
- Vietnamese calligraphy
- Vietnamese pronouns
- Vietnamese studies

== Bibliography ==
=== General ===
- Dương, Quảng-Hàm. (1941). Việt-nam văn-học sử-yếu [Outline history of Vietnamese literature]. Saigon: Bộ Quốc gia Giáo dục.
- Emeneau, M. B. (1947). "Homonyms and puns in Annamese". Language. 23 (3): 239–244. doi:10.2307/409878. JSTOR 409878.
- ——— (1951). Studies in Vietnamese (Annamese) grammar. University of California publications in linguistics. Vol. 8. Berkeley: University of California Press.
- Hashimoto, Mantaro (1978). "Current developments in Sino-Vietnamese studies". Journal of Chinese Linguistics. 6 (1): 1–26. JSTOR 23752818.
- Marr, David G. (1984). Vietnamese Tradition on Trial, 1920–1945. University of California Press. ISBN 978-0-520-90744-7.
- Nguyễn, Đình-Hoà (1995). NTC's Vietnamese–English dictionary (updated ed.). Lincolnwood, Illinois: NTC. ISBN 0-8442-8357-6.
- ——— (1997). Vietnamese: Tiếng Việt không son phấn. Amsterdam: John Benjamins. ISBN 90-272-3809-X.
- Nguyen, Dinh Tham (2018). Studies on Vietnamese Language and Literature: A Preliminary Bibliography. Cornell University Press. ISBN 978-1-501-71882-3.
- Rhodes, Alexandre de (1991). L. Thanh; X. V. Hoàng; Q. C. Đỗ (eds.). Dictionarium Annamiticum Lusitanum et Latinum. Hanoi: Khoa học Xã hội.
- Thompson, Laurence C. (1991) [1965]. A Vietnamese reference grammar. Honolulu: University of Hawaii Press. ISBN 0-8248-1117-8.
- Uỷ ban Khoa học Xã hội Việt Nam. (1983). Ngữ-pháp tiếng Việt [Vietnamese grammar]. Hanoi: Khoa học Xã hội.

=== Sound system ===
- Brunelle, Marc (2009). "Tone perception in Northern and Southern Vietnamese". Journal of Phonetics. 37 (1): 79–96. doi:10.1016/j.wocn.2008.09.003.
- Brunelle, Marc (2009). "Northern and Southern Vietnamese Tone Coarticulation: A Comparative Case Study" (PDF). Journal of Southeast Asian Linguistics. 1: 49–62. Archived from the original (PDF) on 13 November 2018.
- Kirby, James P. (2011). "Vietnamese (Hanoi Vietnamese)" (PDF). Journal of the International Phonetic Association. 41 (3): 381–392. doi:10.1017/S0025100311000181. S2CID 144227569.
- Michaud, Alexis (2004). "Final consonants and glottalization: New perspectives from Hanoi Vietnamese". Phonetica. 61 (2–3): 119–146. doi:10.1159/000082560. PMID 15662108. S2CID 462578.
- Nguyễn, Văn Lợi; Edmondson, Jerold A (1998). "Tones and voice quality in modern northern Vietnamese: Instrumental case studies". Mon-Khmer Studies. 28: 1–18.
- Thompson, Laurence E (1959). "Saigon phonemics". Language. 35 (3): 454–476. doi:10.2307/411232. JSTOR 411232.

=== Language variation ===
- Alves, Mark J. 2007. "A Look At North-Central Vietnamese" In SEALS XII Papers from the 12th Annual Meeting of the Southeast Asian Linguistics Society 2002, edited by Ratree Wayland et al. Canberra, Australia, 1–7. Pacific Linguistics, Research School of Pacific and Asian Studies, The Australian National University
- Alves, Mark J.; & Nguyễn, Duy Hương. (2007). "Notes on Thanh-Chương Vietnamese in Nghệ-An province". In M. Alves, M. Sidwell, & D. Gil (Eds.), SEALS VIII: Papers from the 8th annual meeting of the Southeast Asian Linguistics Society 1998 (pp. 1–9). Canberra: Pacific Linguistics, The Australian National University, Research School of Pacific and Asian Studies
- Hoàng, Thị Châu (1989). Tiếng Việt trên các miền đất nước: Phương ngữ học [Vietnamese in different areas of the country: Dialectology]. Hanoi: Khoa học xã hội.
- Honda, Koichi. (2006). "F0 and phonation types in Nghe Tinh Vietnamese tones". In P. Warren & C. I. Watson (Eds.), Proceedings of the 11th Australasian International Conference on Speech Science and Technology (pp. 454–459). Auckland, New Zealand: University of Auckland.
- Michaud, Alexis; Ferlus, Michel; & Nguyễn, Minh-Châu. (2015). "Strata of standardization: the Phong Nha dialect of Vietnamese (Quảng Bình Province) in historical perspective". Linguistics of the Tibeto-Burman Area, Dept. of Linguistics, University of California, 2015, 38 (1), pp. 124–162.
- Pham, Andrea Hoa. (2005). "Vietnamese tonal system in Nghi Loc: A preliminary report". In C. Frigeni, M. Hirayama, & S. Mackenzie (Eds.), Toronto working papers in linguistics: Special issue on similarity in phonology (Vol. 24, pp. 183–459). Auckland, New Zealand: University of Auckland.
- Vũ, Thanh Phương. (1982). "Phonetic properties of Vietnamese tones across dialects". In D. Bradley (Ed.), Papers in Southeast Asian linguistics: Tonation (Vol. 8, pp. 55–75). Sydney: Pacific Linguistics, The Australian National University.
- Vương, Hữu Lễ. (1981). "Vài nhận xét về đặc diểm của vần trong thổ âm Quảng Nam ở Hội An" [Some notes on special qualities of the rhyme in local Quảng Nam speech in Hội An]. In Một Số Vấn Ðề Ngôn Ngữ Học Việt Nam [Some linguistics issues in Vietnam] (pp. 311–320). Hà Nội: Nhà Xuất Bản Ðại Học và Trung Học Chuyên Nghiệp.

=== Pragmatics ===
- Luong, Hy Van. (1987). "Plural markers and personal pronouns in Vietnamese person reference: An analysis of pragmatic ambiguity and negative models". Anthropological Linguistics, 29(1), 49–70. JSTOR 30028089
- Sophana, Srichampa (2004). "Politeness strategies in Hanoi Vietnamese speech". Mon-Khmer Studies. 34: 137–157.
- Sophana, Srichampa (2005). "Comparison of greetings in the Vietnamese dialects of Ha Noi and Ho Chi Minh City". Mon-Khmer Studies. 35: 83–99.

=== Historical and comparative ===
- Alves, Mark J. (2001). "What's So Chinese About Vietnamese?" (PDF). In Thurgood, Graham W. (ed.). Papers from the Ninth Annual Meeting of the Southeast Asian Linguistics Society. Arizona State University, Program for Southeast Asian Studies. pp. 221–242. ISBN 978-1-881044-27-7.
- Alves, Mark (2020). "Historical Ethnolinguistic Notes on Proto-Austroasiatic and Proto-Vietic Vocabulary in Vietnamese". Journal of the Southeast Asian Linguistics Society. 13 (2): xiii–xlv. hdl:10524/52472.
- Alves, Mark (2021). "Linguistic influence of Chinese in Southeast Asia". In Sidwell, Paul; Jenny, Mathias (eds.). The Languages and Linguistics of Mainland Southeast Asia: A Comprehensive Guide. Berlin: De Gruyter Mouton. pp. 649–671. doi:10.1515/9783110558142-027. ISBN 978-3-11-055606-3.
- Chamberlain, James (2019), "Vanishing Nomads: Languages and Peoples of Nakai, Laos, and Adjacent Areas", in Brunn, Stanley; Kehrein, Roland (eds.), Handbook of the Changing World Language Map, Vientiane: Springer International Publishing, pp. 1589–1606, ISBN 978-3-03002-437-6
- Cooke, Joseph R. (1968). Pronominal reference in Thai, Burmese, and Vietnamese. University of California publications in linguistics (No. 52). Berkeley: University of California Press.
- Ferlus, Michel (1992). "Histoire abrégée de l'évolution des consonnes initiales du Vietnamien et du Sino-Vietnamien". Mon-Khmer Studies. 20: 111–125.
- Ferlus, Michel (2009). "A Layer of Dongsonian Vocabulary in Vietnamese". Journal of the Southeast Asian Linguistics Society. 1: 95–108.
- Gong, Xun (2019). "Chinese loans in Old Vietnamese with a sesquisyllabic phonology". Journal of Language Relationship. 17 (1–2): 55–72. doi:10.31826/jlr-2019-171-209. S2CID 212689052.
- Gregerson, Kenneth J. (1969). "A study of Middle Vietnamese phonology". Bulletin de la Société des Études Indochinoises, 44, 135–193. (Reprinted in 1981).
- Maspero, Henri (1912). "Études sur la phonétique historique de la langue annamite. Les initiales". Bulletin de l'École française d'Extrême-Orient. 12 (1): 1–124. doi:10.3406/befeo.1912.2713.
- Nguyễn, Đình-Hoà (1986). "Alexandre de Rhodes' dictionary". Papers in Linguistics. 19: 1–18. doi:10.1080/08351818609389247.
- Nguyễn, Đình-Hoà (2009). "Vietnamese". In Comrie, Bernard (ed.). The World's Major Languages (2nd ed.). Routledge. pp. 677–692. ISBN 978-0-415-35339-7.
- Sagart, Laurent (2008), "The expansion of Setaria farmers in East Asia", in Sanchez-Mazas, Alicia; Blench, Roger; Ross, Malcolm D.; Ilia, Peiros; Lin, Marie (eds.), Past human migrations in East Asia: matching archaeology, linguistics and genetics, Routledge, pp. 133–157, ISBN 978-0-415-39923-4
- Sidwell, Paul; Alves, Mark (2021). "The Vietic languages: a phylogenetic analysis". Journal of Language Relationship. 19 (3–4): 166–194. doi:10.31826/jlr-2021-193-405.
- Shimizu, Maasaki (2015). "A Reconstruction of Ancient Vietnamese Initials Using Chữ Nôm Materials". NINJAL Research Papers. 9 (1–2): 135–158. doi:10.15084/00000465.
- Shorto, Harry L. (2006). Sidwell, Paul; Cooper, Doug; Bauer, Christian (eds.). A Mon–Khmer comparative dictionary. Canberra: Pacific Linguistics, Australian National University. ISBN 0-85883-570-3.
- Thompson, Laurence E (1967). "The history of Vietnamese final palatals". Language. 43 (1): 362–371. doi:10.2307/411402. JSTOR 411402.
- Phan, John D. (2025). Lost Tongues of the Red River: Annamese Middle Chinese & the Origins of the Vietnamese Language. Harvard University Press. ISBN 9780674301696.

=== Orthography ===
- DeFrancis, John (1977). Colonialism and language policy in Viet Nam. Mouton. ISBN 978-90-279-7643-7.
- Haudricourt, André-Georges (1949). "Origine des particularités de l'alphabet vietnamien". Dân Việt-Nam. 3: 61–68.
  - English translation: Michaud, Alexis; Haudricourt, André-Georges (2010). "The origin of the peculiarities of the Vietnamese alphabet". Mon-Khmer Studies. 39: 89–104. Archived from the original on 14 August 2021.
- Nguyễn, Đình-Hoà (1955). Quốc-ngữ: The modern writing system in Vietnam. Washington, DC: Nguyễn Đình-Hoà.
- Nguyễn, Đình-Hoà (1990). "Graphemic borrowing from Chinese: The case of chữ nôm, Vietnam's demotic script". Bulletin of the Institute of History and Philology, Academia Sinica. 61: 383–432.
- Nguyễn, Đình-Hoà (1996). "Vietnamese". In Daniels, P. T.; Bright, W. (eds.). The world's writing systems. New York: Oxford University Press. pp. 691–699. ISBN 978-0-19-507993-7.

=== Pedagogical ===
- Nguyen, Bich Thuan (1997). Contemporary Vietnamese: An intermediate text. Southeast Asian language series. Northern Illinois University, Center for Southeast Asian Studies.
- Healy, Dana (2004). Teach Yourself Vietnamese. Chicago: McGraw-Hill.
- Hoang, Thinh; Nguyen, Xuan Thu; Trinh, Quynh-Tram (2000). Vietnamese phrasebook (3rd ed.). Hawthorn, Vic.: Lonely Planet.
- Moore, John (1994). Colloquial Vietnamese: A complete language course. London: Routledge.
- Nguyễn, Đình-Hoà (1967). Read Vietnamese: A graded course in written Vietnamese. Rutland, VT: C. E. Tuttle.
- Lâm, Lý-duc; Emeneau, M. B.; von den Steinen, Diether (1944). An Annamese reader. Berkeley: University of California.
- Nguyễn, Đăng Liêm (1970). Vietnamese pronunciation. PALI language texts: Southeast Asia. Honolulu: University of Hawaii Press.
