= Dictionarium Annamiticum Lusitanum et Latinum =

1651 book by Alexandre de Rhodes

Title page of the Dictionarium Annamiticum Lusitanum et Latinum. Note the spelling mistake of the word Annamiticum, as it has three ns.

First page of Dictionarium Annamiticum Lusitanum et Latinum.

The Dictionarium Annamiticum Lusitanum et Latinum (known in Vietnamese as Tự điển Việt-Bồ-La) is a trilingual Vietnamese-Portuguese-Latin dictionary written by the French Jesuit lexicographer Alexandre de Rhodes after 12 years in Vietnam. It was published by the Propaganda Fide in Rome in 1651, upon Rhodes's visit to Europe, along with his catechism Phép giảng tám ngày.

The dictionary has 8,000 Vietnamese entries with glosses in Portuguese and Latin. The dictionary established chữ Quốc ngữ, the Vietnamese alphabet, which was refined by later missionaries and eventually became the predominant writing system for Vietnamese. However, Christian publications in Vietnam continued to use either Latin or the traditional Vietnamese chữ Nôm for the next 200 years, instead of the simpler alphabetic Quốc ngữ. Quốc ngữ only gained predominance after the French invasion of 1858 and the establishment of French Indochina.

== Background ==
Before Rhodes's work, traditional Vietnamese dictionaries showed the correspondences between Chinese characters and Vietnamese chữ Nôm script. From the 17th century, Western missionaries started to devise a romanization system that represented the Vietnamese language to facilitate the propagation of the Christian faith, which culminated in the Dictionarium Annamiticum Lusitanum et Latinum of Alexandre de Rhodes.

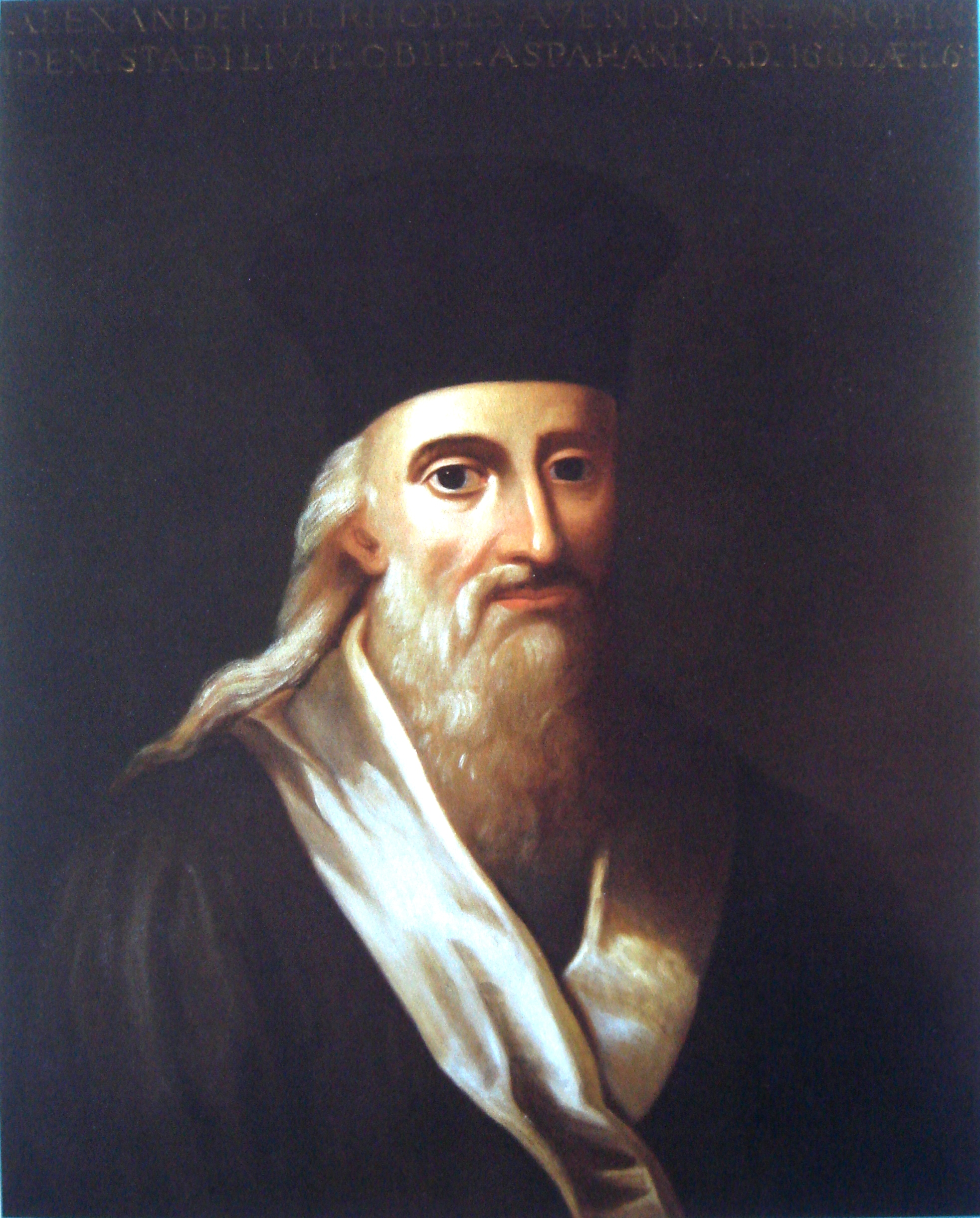
The Jesuit Alexandre de Rhodes created the Dictionarium Annamiticum Lusitanum et Latinum.

Dictionarium Annamiticum Lusitanum et Latinum was itself inspired by two earlier lost works: a Vietnamese–Portuguese dictionary by Gaspar do Amaral and a Portuguese–Vietnamese dictionary by António Barbosa.

== Content ==
The dictionary has 8,000 Vietnamese entries with glosses in Portuguese and Latin. The publication also incorporates a summary on Vietnamese grammar (Linguae Annamiticae seu Tunchinensis Brevis Declaratio) and the codification of some contemporary pronunciations.

== Impact ==
The dictionary established chữ Quốc ngữ, the Vietnamese alphabet, which was refined by later missionaries and eventually became the predominant writing system for Vietnamese. Mgr Pigneau de Béhaine contributed to these improvements with his 1783 Annamite–Latin dictionary, the manuscript of which was remitted to Mgr Jean-Louis Taberd who published in 1838 his Vietnamese–Latin / Latin–Vietnamese dictionary.

Despite those efforts, Christian publications in Vietnam continued to use either Latin or the traditional Vietnamese chữ Nôm, rather than the simpler alphabetic Quốc ngữ, for the next 200 years. Quốc ngữ only gained predominance after the French invasion of 1858 and the establishment of French protectorate.

== See also ==
- Lịch sử nước An Nam
- France-Vietnam relations

== Notes ==
=== References ===
- Gaudio, Andrew (2019). "A Translation of the Linguae Annamiticae seu Tunchinensis brevis declaratio: The First Grammar of Quốc Ngữ". Journal of Vietnamese Studies. 14 (3). University of California Press: 79–114. doi:10.1525/vs.2019.14.3.79. S2CID 202274343.
