= Lịch sử nước An Nam =

The Lịch sử nước An Nam (History of Annam) is a history text written by Benedict Thiện in 1659, covering the history of Vietnam from early mythology to the year 1593.

The writer was a 17th-century Jesuit who lived in Hanoi. The history is a summary of then-available Vietnamese royal chronicles, while also covering information on geography, cultural history, and religious history. The book was offered to the writer's immediate superior Giovanni Filippo de Marini, who took it with him when he left Vietnam in 1661. The surviving manuscript is part of the Vatican Library's collection.

== Background of the writer and sources used ==
Benedict Thiện was a Vietnamese Catholic pastor and a member of the Society of Jesus in 17th-century Hanoi. He summarised Vietnamese royal chronicles with information about geography, culture, religions and churches. He finished the book in 1659, written in the Vietnamese alphabet. He presented the book to his superior bishop Giovanni Filippo de Marini, who then left Vietnam in 1661. It had no title, and later was named and regarded as Lịch sử nước An Nam by bishop Đỗ Quang Chính.

== Location of the manuscript ==
The original manuscript is currently stored inside Vatican Library, Holy See.

== Work cited ==
- Đỗ, Quang Chính (1972), Lịch sử chữ Quốc Ngữ, 1620–1659, Sài Gòn: Tủ sách Ra Khơi
- Zottoli, Brian A. (2011), Reconceptualizing Southern Vietnamese History from the 15th to 18th Centuries: Competition along the Coasts from Guangdong to Cambodia, University of Michigan
