= Dominic Đặng Văn Cầu =

Vietnamese prelate (born 1962)

His Excellency, The Most Reverend Dominic Đặng Văn Cầu
- Bishop of Thái Bình
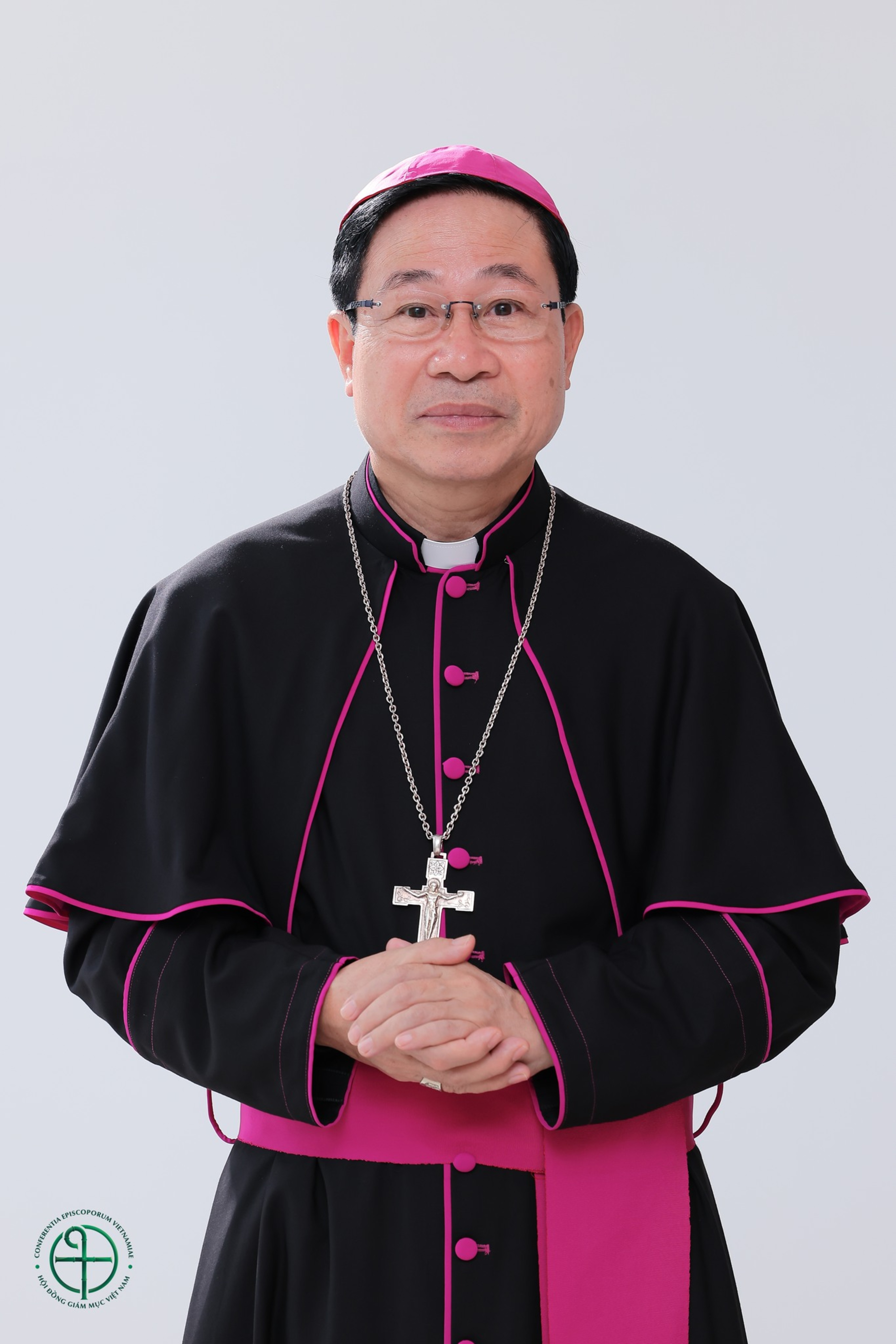
- Official portrait, 2024
- Native name: Đa Minh Đặng Văn Cầu
- Province: Hà Nội
- See: Thái Bình
- Appointed: 29 October 2022
- Installed: 31 December 2022
- Predecessor: Pierre Nguyễn Văn Đệ SDB
- Previous posts: Rector, Sacred Heart Major Seminary of Thái Bình (2017-2022)

Orders
- Ordination: 9 March 1996 by François-Xavier Nguyễn Văn Sang
- Consecration: 31 December 2022 by Pierre Nguyễn Văn Đệ SDB, Joseph Nguyễn Tấn Tước, and Joseph Trần Văn Toản

Personal details
- Born: 17 July 1962 (age 64) Thái Bình, Việt Nam
- Education: Institut Catholique de Paris
- Motto: Ecce venio (Behold I come) (Này con xin đến)
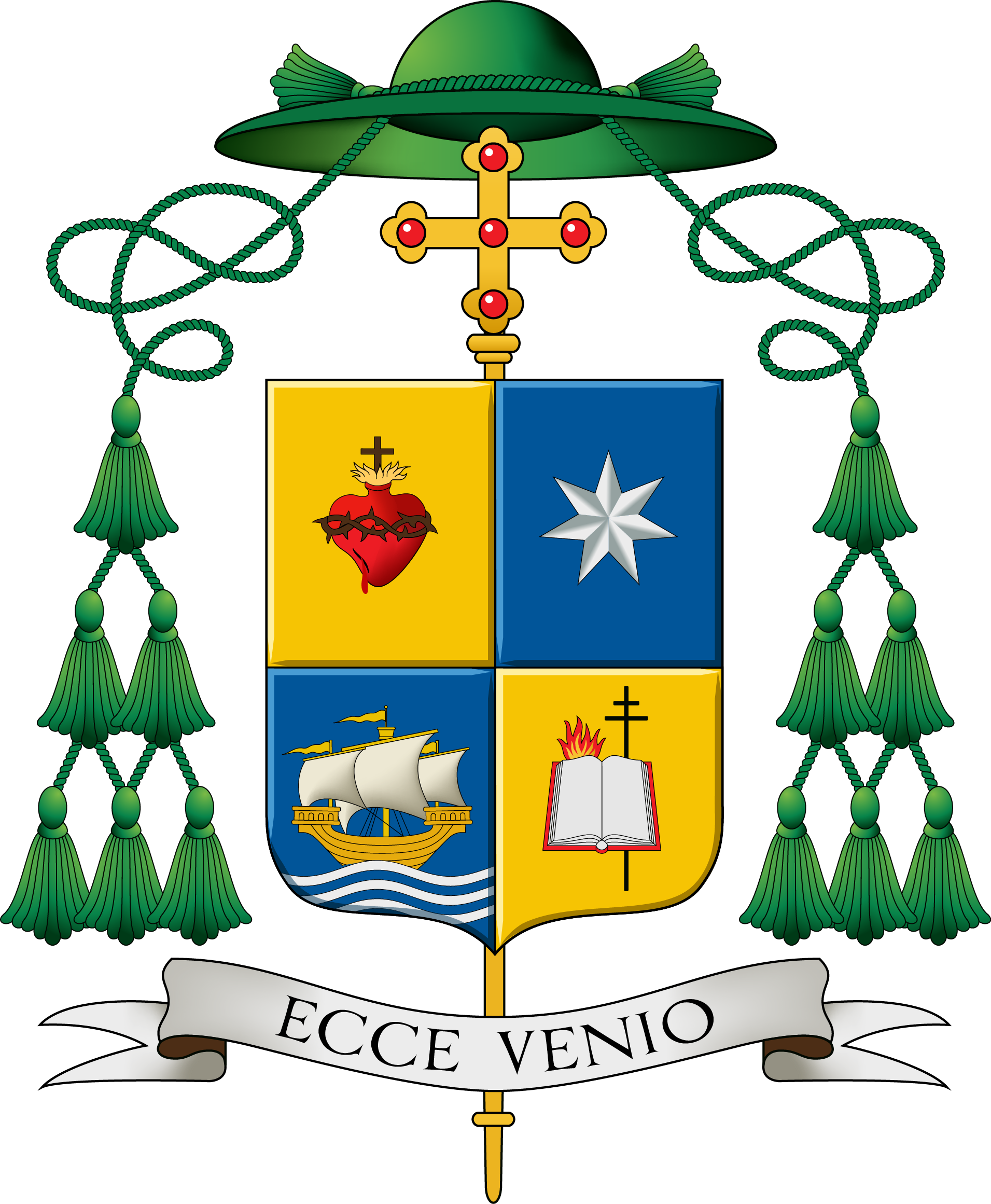
- Coat of arms: Dominic Đặng Văn Cầu's coat of arms

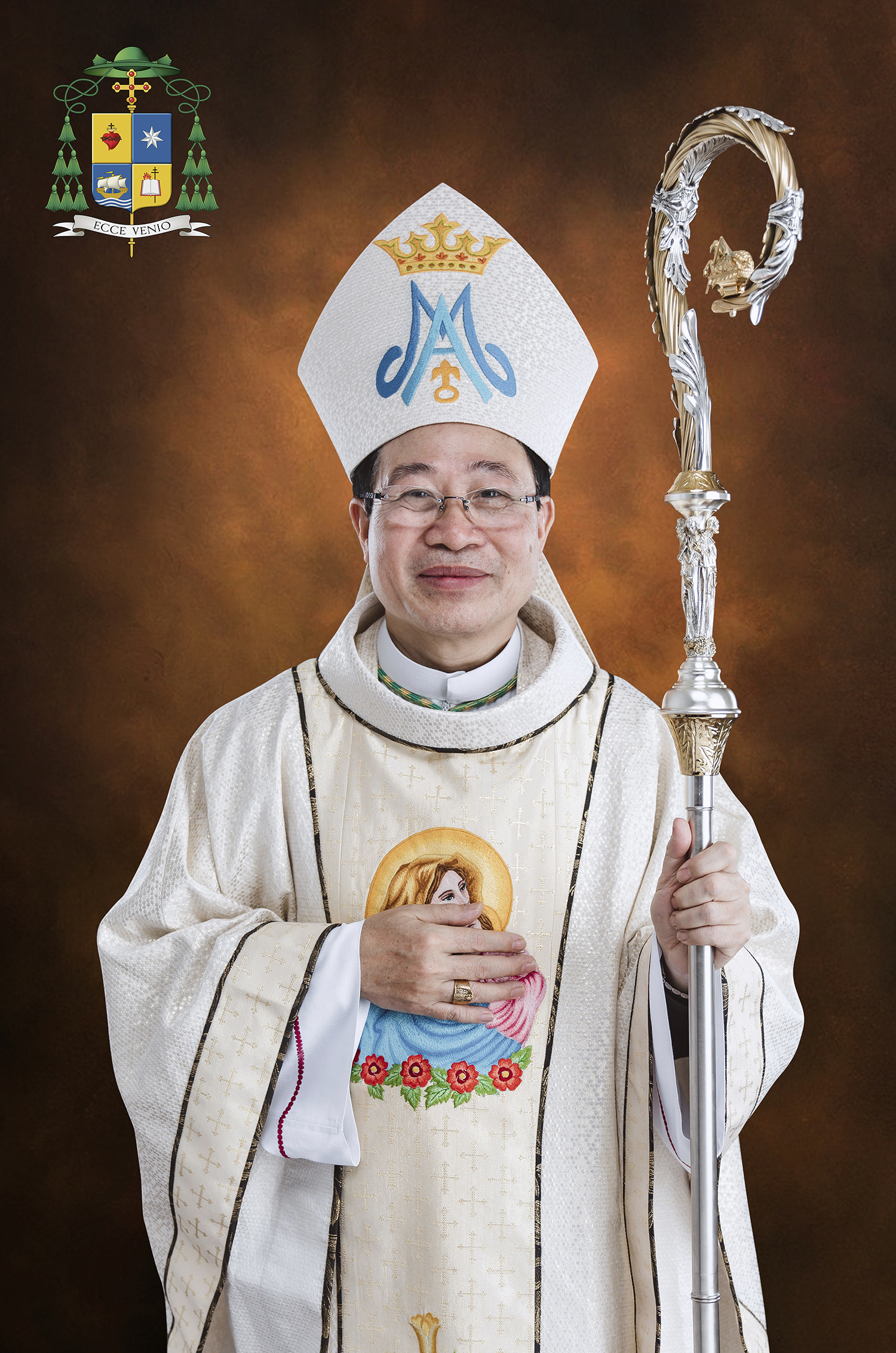
Official portrait of Cầu in episcopal vestments.

Dominic Đặng Văn Cầu (Vietnamese: Đa Minh Đặng Văn Cầu) is a Vietnamese Catholic prelate who serves as the Bishop of Thái Bình. He was ordained to the priesthood on 9 March 1996 and previously served as Rector of the Sacred Heart Major Seminary of Thái Bình from 2017.

Cầu was appointed Bishop of Thái Bình on 29 October 2022. Another priest, Joseph Bùi Công Trác, was supposed to be appointed on the same day as him, but Trác was appointed later, on 1 November, because Archbishop Joseph Nguyễn Năng was on retreat.

He was consecrated a bishop by Bishop Pierre Nguyễn Văn Đệ SDB on 31 December 2022 at the front of the Diocesan Pastoral Center (adjacent to the cathedral). His co-consecrators were Joseph Nguyễn Tấn Tước, Bishop of Phú Cường and Joseph Trần Văn Toản, Bishop of Long Xuyên. (Note: Bishop Toản had parents that were natives of Thái Bình.)
