= Komani-Kruja culture =

Archaeological culture in Albania, Montenegro, and North Macedonia

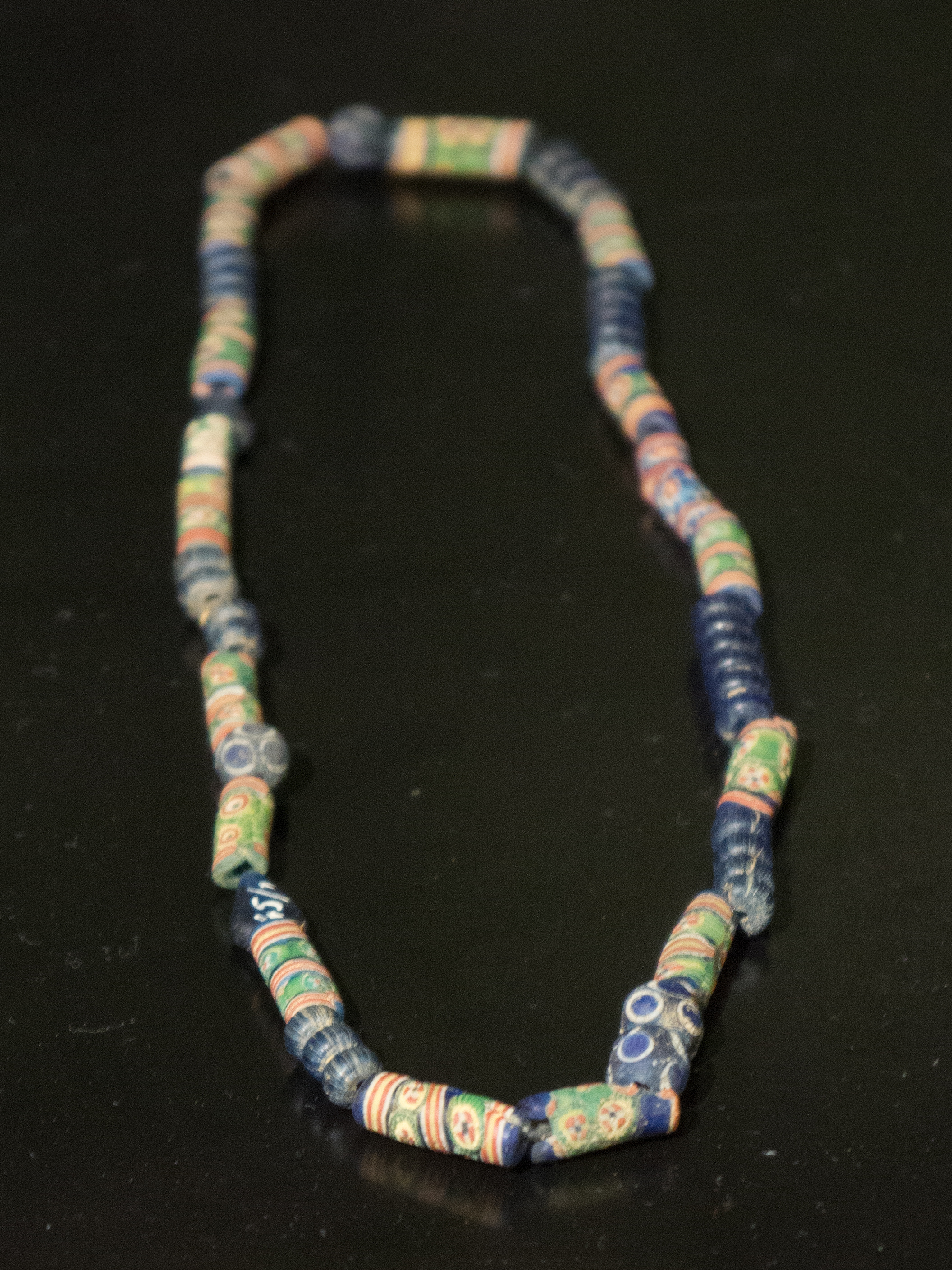
Glass necklace, 7th - 8th century, Shurdhah

The Komani-Kruja culture is an archaeological culture attested from late antiquity to the Middle Ages in central and northern Albania, southern Montenegro and similar sites in the western parts of North Macedonia. It consists of settlements usually built below hillforts along the Lezhë (Praevalitana)-Dardania and Via Egnatia road networks which connected the Adriatic coastline with the central Balkan Roman provinces. Its type site is Koman and its fort on the nearby Dalmacë hill in the Drin river valley. Kruja and Lezha represent significant sites of the culture. The population of Komani-Kruja represents a local, western Balkan people which was linked to the Roman Justinianic military system of forts. The development of Komani-Kruja is significant for the study of the transition between the classical antiquity population of Albania to the medieval Albanians who were attested in the same area in historical records in the 11th century.

== Geography ==
Komani-Kruja is a network of rural and urban settlements and their cemeteries which flourished in central and northern Albania and nearby regions. In central Albania, the rural settlements of Arbë, Klos, Kaçinar and Malaj have been identified. Urban settlements developed via the urbanization of the areas around local forts include Kruja, Lezha, Dalmacë, Sarda. Cemeteries range from Lake Shkodër to Lake Ohrid (northwest to southeast) and from the hinterland of Durrës to the Drin river valley (southwest to northeast).

== History of excavations ==
The earliest discoveries around the Koman culture were made in 1898, around the graveyard of the Dalmacë castle, near Koman. Part of the artifacts found are in bronze and iron, the rest in silver and glass, in addition there are also ceramic vases. The bronze and iron material artifacts are mainly weapons and tools, such as axes, knives, and spearheads. Ornaments, made in bronze, glass, and silver include rings, fibulas, ear rings, bracelets, and glass necklaces. Similar artifacts have been discovered in the Cape of Rodon, as well as close to Krujë. Until 1990 around 30 archaeological sites with similar artifacts dated to the same time period (7th-9th centuries AD) were found in various territories of Albania as well as modern Kosovo. Limited excavations campaigns occurred until the 1990s. Objects from a vast area covering nearby regions the entire Byzantine Empire, the northern Balkans and Hungary and sea routes from Sicily to Crimea were found in Dalmacë and other sites coming from many different production centres: local, Byzantine, Sicilian, Avar-Slavic, Hungarian, Crimean and even possibly Merovingian and Carolingian.

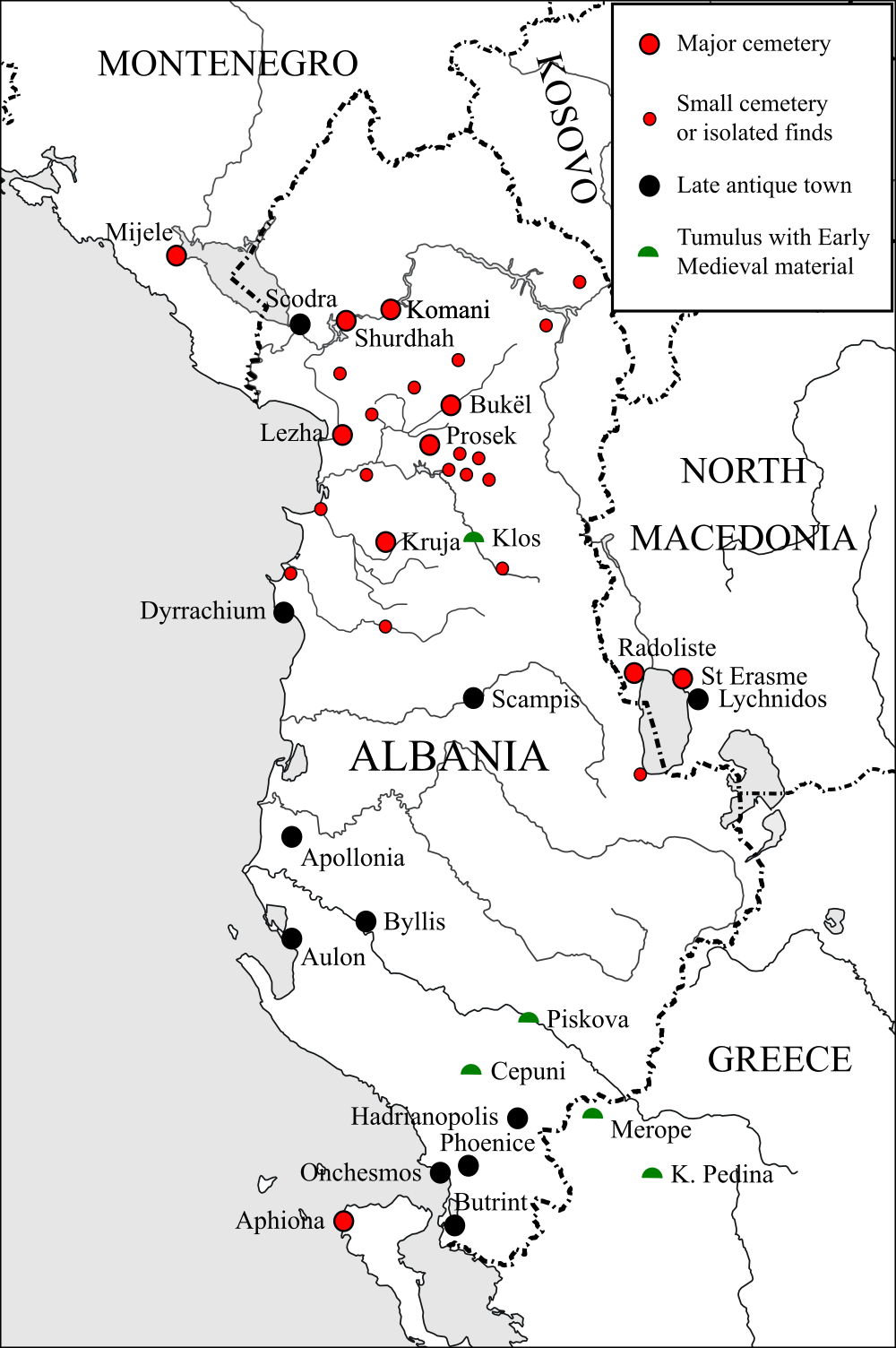
Komani-Kruja sites in Albania.

Within Albanian archaeology, based on the continuity of pre-Roman Illyrian forms in the production of several types of local objects found in graves, the population of Komani-Kruja was framed as a group which descended from the local Illyrians who "re-asserted their independence" from the Roman Empire after many centuries and formed the core of the later historical region of Arbanon. As research focused almost entirely on grave contexts and burial sites, settlements and living spaces were often ignored. Yugoslav archaeology proposed an opposite narrative and tried to frame the population as Slavic, especially in the region of western Macedonia. Florin Curta claimed that the archaeological research has shown that these sites were not related to regions then inhabited by Slavs, viewing the culture related to a late Roman period military garrisons. John Wilkes argued it is related to local late Roman refugees during the 6-7th century migrations caused by Slavic incursions and colonisation of the Balkans. What was established in the research was that Komani-Kruja settlements represented a local, non-Slavic population which has been described as Romanized Illyrian, Latin-speaking or Latin-literate. This is corroborated by the absence of Slavic toponyms and survival of Latin ones in the Komani-Kruja area, but not around Lake Ohrid and cannot be entirely excluded interaction with the Slavs and Avars. In terms of historiography, the thesis of older Albanian archaeology was an untestable hypothesis as no historical sources exist which can link Komani-Kruja to the first definite attestation of medieval Albanians in the 11th century.

Archaeologically, while it was considered possible and even likely that Komani-Kruja sites were used continuously from the 7th century onwards, it remained an untested hypothesis as research was still limited. Whether this population represented local continuity or arrived at an earlier period from a more northern location as the Slavs entered the Balkans remained unclear at the time but regardless of their ultimate geographical origins, these groups maintained Justinianic era cultural traditions of the 6th century possibly as a statement of their collective identity and derived their material cultural references from the Justinianic military system. In this context, they may have used burial customs as a means of reference to an "idealized image of the past Roman power". Winnifrith (2020) recently described this population as the survival of a "Latin-Illyrian" culture which emerged later in historical records as Albanians and Vlachs. In Winnifrith's narrative, the geographical conditions of northern Albania favored the continuation of the Albanian language in hilly and mountainous areas as opposed to lowland valleys.

A ring found among the artifacts, had an inscription, which according to the Austrian Albanologist Ippen, as well as German linguist Krahe, was in Illyrian language, however Albanian archaeologist Hasan Ceka, and the Bulgarian archaeologist L. Ognenova proved that the inscription (KEBOH HANA English: God, please help Anna) was a prayer, in a formula that can be found in Medieval Greek. In addition, the ring was dated to a later century than several other artifacts (11th century, rather than 7th-9th centuries). Later, multiple rings, similar to the first were found, in different sites. Their ubiquitous presence suggest that they are the result of local production, and not imported.

Research greatly expanded after 2009 and the first survey of Komani's topography was produced in 2014. Until then, except for the area of the cemetery the size of the settlement and its extension remained unknown. In 2014, it was revealed that Komani occupied an area of more than 40 ha, a much larger territory than originally thought. Its oldest settlement phase dates to the Hellenistic era. Proper development began in the late antiquity and continued well into the Middle Ages (13th-14th centuries). It indicates that Komani was a late Roman fort and an important trading node in the networks of Praevalitana and Dardania. Participation in trade networks of the eastern Mediterranean via sea routes seems to have been very limited even in nearby coastal territory in this era. In the Avar-Slavic raids, communities from present-day northern Albania and nearby areas clustered around hill sites for better protection as is the case of other areas like Lezha and Sarda. During the 7th century as Byzantine authority was reestablished after the Avar-Slavic raids and the prosperity of the settlements increased, Komani saw increase in population and a new elite began to take shape. Increase in population and wealth was marked by the establishment of new settlements and new churches in their vicinity. Komani formed a local network with Lezha and Kruja and in turn this network was integrated in the wider Byzantine Mediterranean world, maintained contacts with the northern Balkans and engaged in long-distance trade.

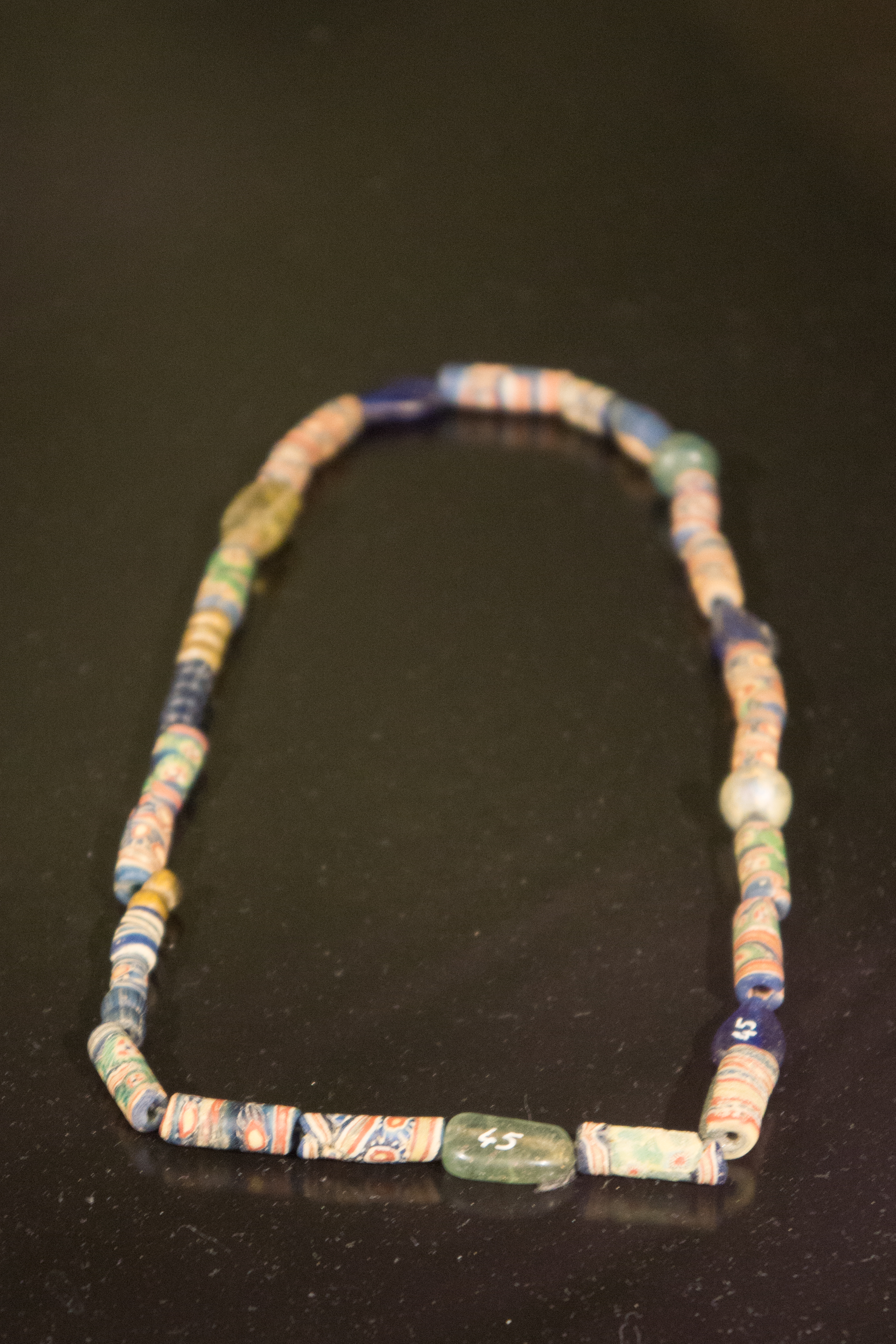
Glass necklace, 7th - 8th century AD, Shurdhah

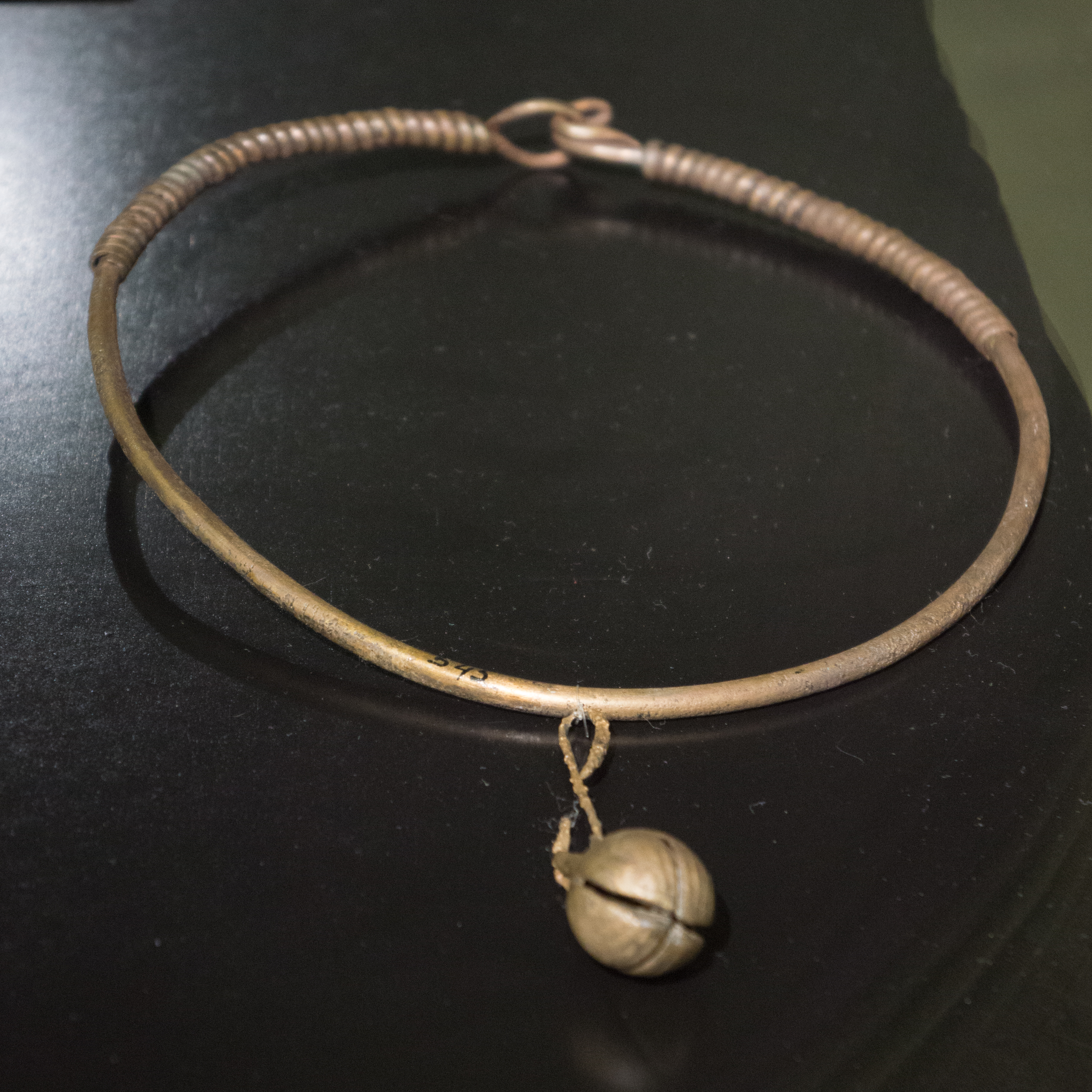
Torc, 7th - 8th century AD, Koman

== Identified sites ==
Identified places and settlements of Komani-Kruja culture in Albania and its environments. Major excavation sites are marked with bigger dots, smaller sites are marked with smaller ones.

| # | Settlement | Type | Geographic coordinates |
|---|---|---|---|
| 1 | Krujë | Large excavated cemeteries | 41°30′0″N 19°48′0″E |
| 2 | Komani | Large excavated cemeteries | 42°05′25″N 19°48′44″E |
| 3 | Lezhë | Large excavated cemeteries | 41°46′55″N 19°38′40″E |
| 4 | Shurdhah | Large excavated cemeteries | 42°04′12″N 19°39′11″E |
| 5 | Radolišta | Large excavated cemeteries | 41°09′51″N 20°37′23″E |
| 6 | Aphiona | Large excavated cemeteries | 39°43′28″N 19°39′37″E |
| 7 | Pogradec | Smaller cemeteries and isolated finds | 40°54′00″N 20°39′00″E |
| 8 | Saint Erasmus | Large excavated cemeteries | 41°08′59″N 20°47′34″E |
| 9 | Mijele | Large excavated cemeteries | 42°14′06″N 19°05′26″E |
| 10 | Prosek | Large excavated cemeteries | 42°45′01″N 19°56′56″E |
| 11 | Bukël | Large excavated cemeteries | 41°51′04″N 20°00′39″E |
| 12 | Malaj | Smaller cemeteries and isolated finds | 41°47′37″N 19°58′52″E |
| 13 | Kaçinar | Smaller cemeteries and isolated finds | |
| 14 | Klos | Smaller cemeteries and isolated finds | |
| 15 | Arbanë | Smaller cemeteries and isolated finds | |
| 16 | Piskovë | Tumuli | |
| 17 | Merope | Tumuli | |
| 18 | Kato Pedina | Tumuli | |
| 19 | Cepuni | Tumuli | |

== Bibliography ==
- Bowden, William (2003), Epirus Vetus: The Archaeology of a Late Antique Province, Duckworth, ISBN 0-7156-3116-0
- Bowden, William (2004). "Balkan Ghosts? Nationalism and the Question of Rural Continuity in Albania". In Christie, Neil (ed.). Landscapes of Change: Rural Evolutions in Late Antiquity and the Early Middle Ages. Ashgate Publishing. ISBN 978-1840146172.
- Bowden, William (2019). Conflicting ideologies and the archaeology of Early Medieval Albania. All'Insegna del Giglio. ISSN 2039-280X.
- Curta, Florin (2012). "Were there any Slavs in Curta seventh-century Macedonia?". Istorija (Skopje). 47: 61–75.
- Curta, Florin (2013). "Seventh-Century Fibulae with Bent Stem in the Balkans". Archaeologia Bulgarica. 17 (1): 49–70.
- Curta, Florin (2021). The Long Sixth Century in Eastern Europe. BRILL. ISBN 978-9004456983.
- Nallbani, Etleva (2007). "Urban and rural funerary practices in early medieval Illyricum: Some general considerations". In Cutler, Anthony (ed.). The Material and the Ideal: Essays in Medieval Art and Archaeology in Honour of Jean-Michel Spieser. BRILL. ISBN 978-9004162860.
- Nallbani, Etleva (2017). "Early Medieval North Albania: New Discoveries, Remodeling Connections: The Case of Medieval Komani". In Gelichi, Sauro; Negrelli, Claudio (eds.). Adriatico altomedievale (VI-XI secolo) Scambi, porti, produzioni (PDF). Università Ca’ Foscari Venezia. ISBN 978-88-6969-115-7. Archived from the original (PDF) on 2022-10-09.
- Wilkes, John (1996) [1992]. The Illyrians. Wiley. ISBN 978-0-631-19807-9.
- Winnifrith, Tom (2021). Nobody's Kingdom: A History of Northern Albania. Signal Books. ISBN 9781909930957.
