= Joseph Trần Xuân Tiếu =

Vietnamese Catholic prelate (1944–2025)

The Most Reverend Joseph Trần Xuân Tiếu
- Bishop of Long Xuyên
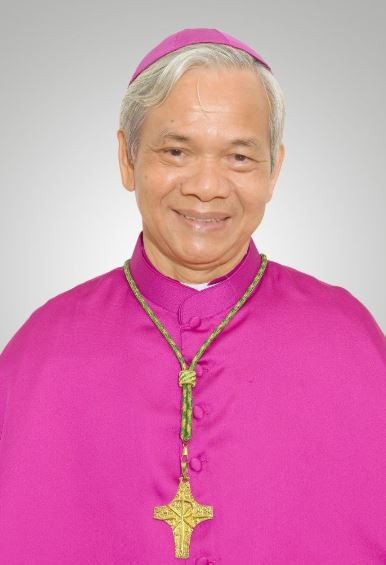
- Official portrait, 2019
- Native name: Giuse Trần Xuân Tiếu
- Church: Catholic
- Province: Sài Gòn
- See: Long Xuyên
- Appointed: 3 June 1999 (as Coadjutor)
- Installed: 2 October 2003
- Term ended: 23 February 2019
- Predecessor: Jean Baptiste Bùi Tuần
- Successor: Joseph Trần Văn Toản

Orders
- Ordination: 10 August 1974
- Consecration: 29 June 1999 by Jean Baptiste Bùi Tuần

Personal details
- Born: 20 August 1944 Nam Định, Tonkin, French Indochina
- Died: 7 January 2025 (aged 80) Long Xuyên, Vietnam
- Denomination: Catholic
- Motto: Ut sint unum (That they may be one) (Để tất cả nên một)
- Styles
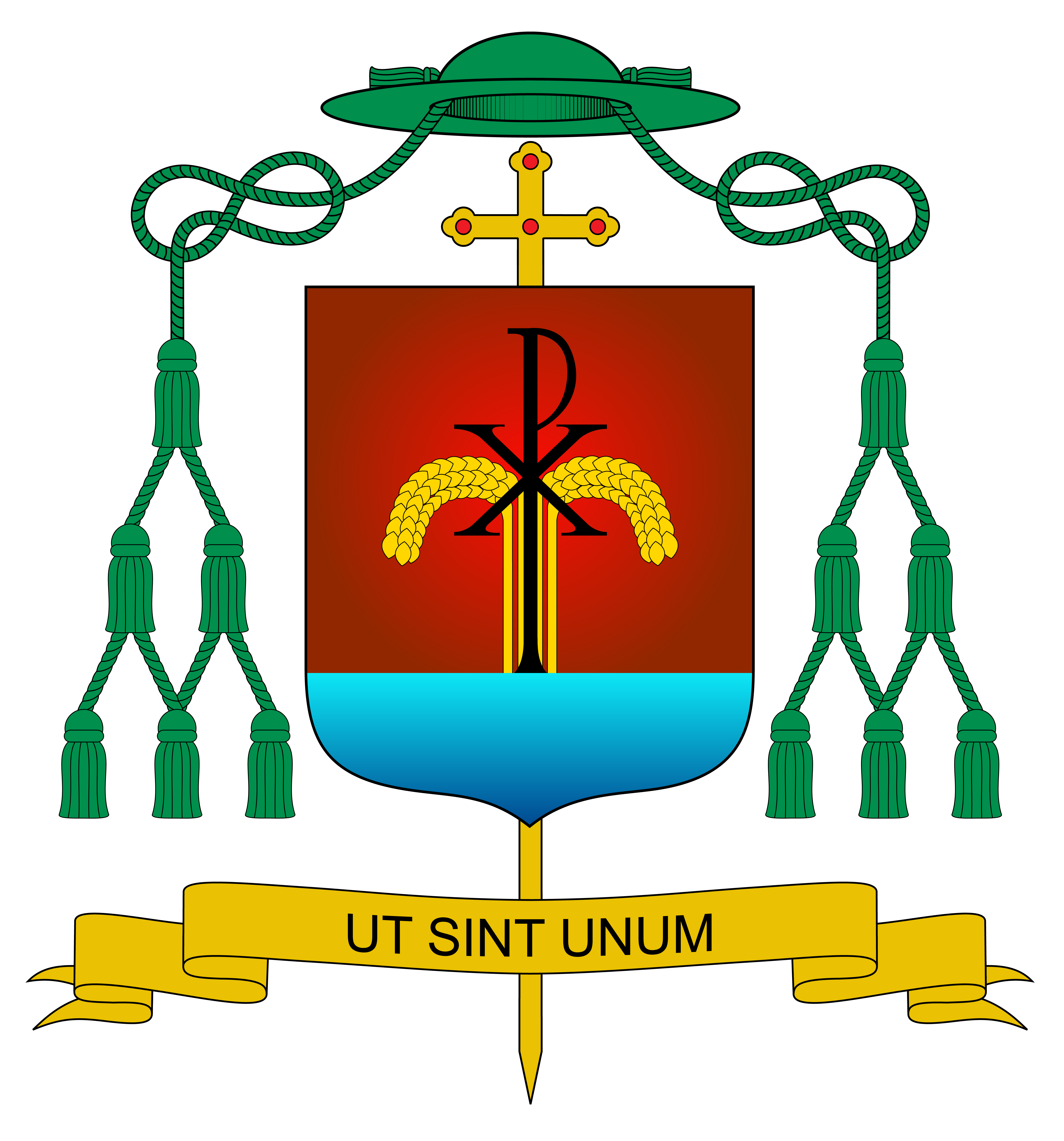
- Reference style: His Excellency; The Most Reverend
- Spoken style: Your Excellency
- Religious style: Bishop

Joseph Trần Xuân Tiếu (20 August 1944 – 7 January 2025) was a Vietnamese Catholic prelate who served as Bishop of Long Xuyên from 2 October 2003 until his retirement on 23 February 2019.

== Biography ==
Trần Xuân Tiếu was born on 20 August 1944 in the Lộc Hòa district (then called Phú Ốc) of the city of Nam Dinh. In 1954, he fled to the south with his family. In 1957, at the age of twelve, he entered the Pius XII Minor Seminary and continued his studies at the St. Joseph Seminary in Saigon. In 1965, after completing the seminary, he was sent to Rome to complete his studies in philosophy and theology at the Pontifical Urban University.

After returning home, he was ordained a priest on 10 August 1974. After his ordination, he served as secretary to Bishop Nguyễn Khắc Ngư until 1995, when he was appointed pastor of the Long Xuyên Cathedral, professor of moral theology at the Thánh Quý Major Seminary in Cần Thơ, and vicar general of the diocese.

=== Episcopal ministry ===
On 3 June 1999, Pope John Paul II appointed him Coadjutor Bishop of Long Xuyên. He was consecrated a bishop on 29 June of the same year by Bishop Jean Baptiste Bùi Tuần. He succeeded to the same see on 2 October 2003, the day his predecessor retired. He served as the president of the Commission for the Laity of the Vietnamese Episcopal Conference for two consecutive terms from 2010 to 2016. Over the years, he advocated for the return of the old St. Thomas Seminary, seized in 1976 following the country's reunification, to resume educational activities, a request that was eventually granted in September 2018. He led the diocese for over fifteen years, resigning on 23 February 2019, at the age of 74.

=== Death ===
Trần Xuân Tiếu died in Long Xuyên on 7 January 2025, at the age of 80.

== Episcopal lineage and apostolic succession ==
The episcopal lineage is:

- Patriarch Eliya XII Denha
- Patriarch Yohannan VIII Hormizd
- Bishop Yohannan Gabriel
- Archbishop Joseph V Augustine Hindi
- Patriarch Joseph VI Audo
- Patriarch Eliya XIV Abulyonan
- Patriarch Yousef VI Emmanuel II Thomas
- Bishop François David
- Archbishop Antonin-Fernand Drapier, O.P.
- Archbishop Pierre Martin Ngô Đình Thục
- Bishop Michel Nguyễn Khắc Ngư
- Bishop Jean Baptiste Bùi Tuần
- Bishop Joseph Trần Xuân Tiếu

The apostolic succession is:

- Bishop Joseph Trần Văn Toản (2014)

Catholic Church titles
Preceded by Jean Baptiste Bùi Tuần	Bishop of Long Xuyên; 2003–2019	Succeeded by Joseph Trần Văn Toản
