= Shurdhah =

Island in Albania

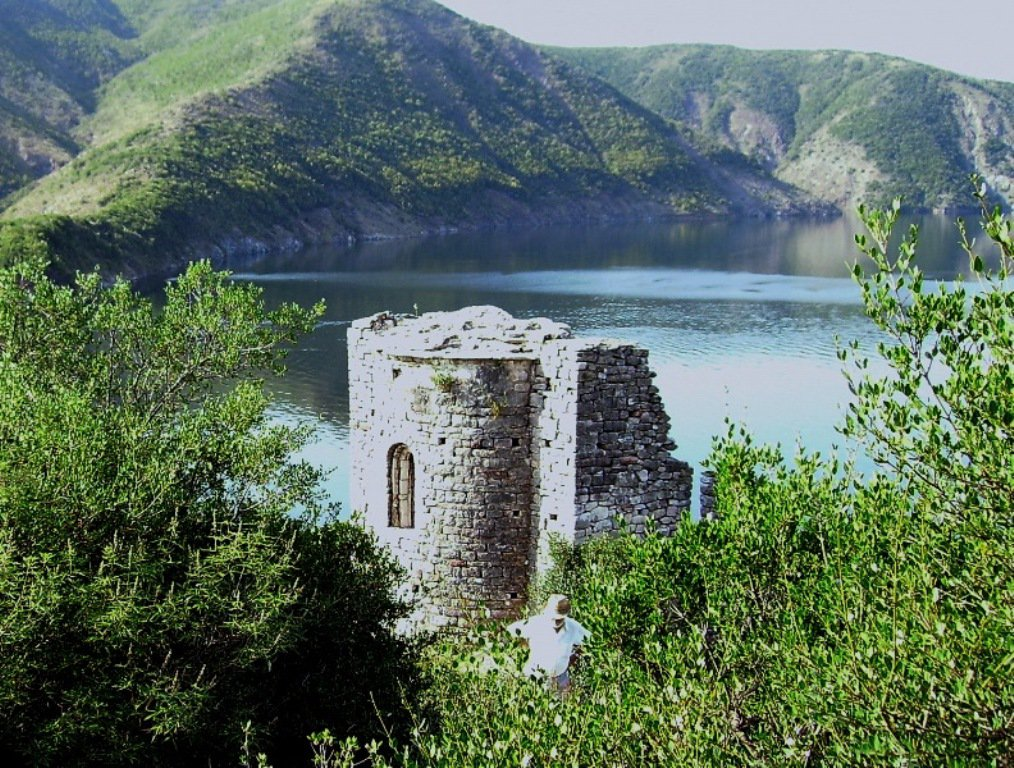
- Medieval church ruins

- Location within Albania
- Etymology: Isle of The Deaf

Geography
- Location: Vau i Dejës Reservoir
- Coordinates: 42°04′12″N 19°39′11″E
- Area: 0.075 km^{2} (0.029 sq mi)
- Area rank: 5th
- Highest elevation: 290 m (950 ft)

Administration
- Albania
- County: Shkodër County
- Municipality: Vau i Dejës

Shurdhah (Albanian: Ishulli i Shurdhahut), also known as Sarda or Sardania, is an island in northern Albania in the Vau i Dejës Reservoir. It was formed after the flooding of the Drin river valley during the construction of the HPS. It is the largest island in the reservoir with an area of 7.5 hectares. From the most northern tip of the island to the most southern tip of it, it has an estimated length of 390 m (1,280 ft). It is accessible by tourist boat in summer from the Vau i Dejës dam or Rragam. Shurdhah is attested in medieval sources as Sarda and its submerged area was an early medieval settlement in Albania linked to the Komani-Kruja culture.

== History ==
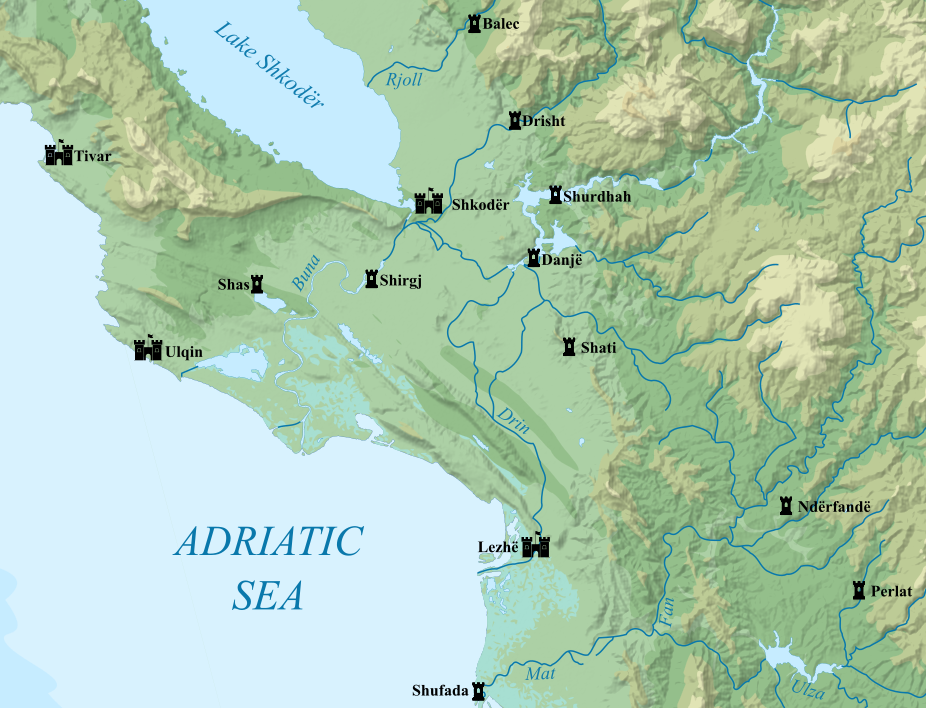
Shurdhah and nearby towns

Sarda was founded between the 6th and 7th centuries and is linked to the development of the Komani-Kruja culture in northern Albania. The town was strategically located on the old road from the Adriatic Sea to Dardania and served as a resting point along the trade route. The settlement originally had a wall encircling the entire hill it was built on. Encircled on three sides by the Drin river, Sarda had 12 defensive towers of various forms. Sarda seems to have been a modest settlement from its foundation to the 9th century when it saw rapid expansion. From the 9th to the 12th century Sarda developed continuously. Two rings of walls were built and fourteen churches were constructed within the site which covered at that time no more than 6ha. Sarda is attested as a bishopric since the 9th century. It may have become the new seat of a bishopric which was previously seated in Koman. In the 12th century, it became the seat of joint bishop of Sapa and Sarda.

In the 13th century Sarda had territorial disagreements with Scutari. Shurdhah was the original settlement of the feudal Lekë Dukagjini patriarch, famous for the rules of the Kanun. It was ravaged by the Ottomans in 1491.

In 1973, when the dam was completed, the city of Sarda became an island on the left bank of the river Drin.

== Ecclesiastical history ==
Around 1100 a Diocese of Sarda was established. No residential incumbents available.

The see of Sardë shortly comprised also the Diocese of Dagnum (Dagno, Daynum, Danj; Daynensis), founded as suffragan of Archbishopric of Antivari (now Bar, in Montenegro) during the second half of the fourteenth century, which was united with Sarda by Pope Martin V in 1428.

The bishopric of Sardë (Sardoniki) itself was suppressed no later than 1600, allegedly in 1491 when Pope Innocent VIII joined it to the Diocese of Sapë (Sappa), and the united sees were suffragans in the ecclesiastical province of the Metropolitan Archdiocese of Antivari until the end of the eighteenth century.

=== Titular see ===
In 1933 the diocese was restored as Titular bishopric of Sarda. The title has been held by:

- Luis Baldo Riva, Redemptorists (C.SS.R.) (1969.03.13 – 1978.01.15) as Auxiliary Bishop of Trujillo (Peru) (1969.03.13 – 1977.06.27), later Bishop-Prelate of Territorial Prelature of Chuquibamba (Peru) (1977.06.27 – death 1983.06.27)
- Roland Pierre DuMaine (1978.04.24 – 1981.01.27) as Auxiliary Bishop of San Francisco (California, USA) (1978.04.24 – 1981.01.27); later Bishop of San Jose (USA) (1981.01.27 – retired 1999.11.27)
- François Xavier Nguyễn Văn Sang (85) (1981.03.24 – 1990.12.03) as Auxiliary Bishop of Hà Nôi (Hanoi, Vietnam) (1981.03.24 – 1990.12.03); later Bishop of Thái Bính (Vietnam) (1990.12.03 – retired 2009.07.25)
- Titular Archbishop Ramiro Moliner Inglés (1993.01.02 – 2024.08.20)

== Tourism ==
One can visit the ruins of the 11th-century medieval castle, which includes two rings of defensive walls and towers (some sadly submerged in the lake), the remains of a Byzantine church and other early medieval walls. The setting on the steep rocks rising from the lake is especially impressive.

== Sources ==
- Nallbani, Etleva (2017). "Early Medieval North Albania: New Discoveries, Remodeling Connections: The Case of Medieval Komani". In Gelichi, Sauro; Negrelli, Claudio (eds.). Adriatico altomedievale (VI-XI secolo) Scambi, porti, produzioni (PDF). Università Ca’ Foscari Venezia. ISBN 978-88-6969-115-7.
