= Queen of Peace Cathedral, Long Xuyên =

Queen of Peace Cathedral
- Nhà thờ Chính tòa Đức Maria Ban Hòa Bình
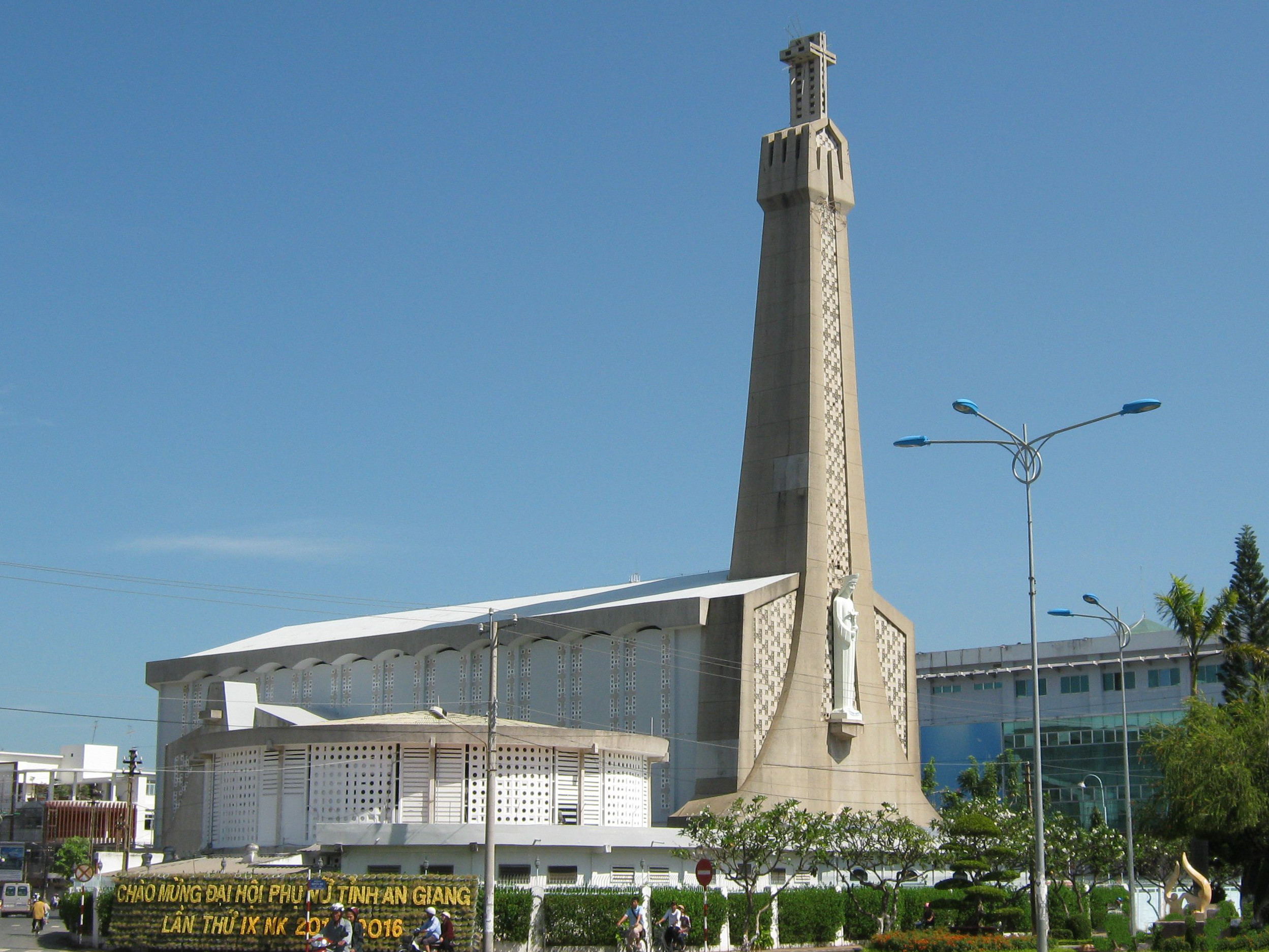

- Location within Vietnam
- 10.38161°N 105.43963°E
- Location: Long Xuyên
- Country: Vietnam
- Denomination: Roman Catholic Church

Administration
- Diocese: Roman Catholic Diocese of Long Xuyên

The Queen of Peace Cathedral (Vietnamese: Nhà thờ Chính tòa Đức Maria Ban Hòa Bình), also called Regina Pacis Cathedral or Long Xuyên Cathedral, is a religious building that is located in Long Xuyen, capital city of the province of An Giang in the Mekong Delta region in the Southeast Asian country of Vietnam.

The Cathedral follows the Roman or Latin rite and is the mother church of the Diocese of Long Xuyên (Dioecesis Longxuyensis or Giáo phận Long Xuyên) which was created in 1960 by the bull Christi Mandata of Pope John XXIII. It was formally consecrated in 1974.

The façade of the Cathedral features a large statue dedicated to the Virgin Mary and a 55-meter-tall tower.

== See also ==
- List of cathedrals in Vietnam
- Roman Catholicism in Vietnam
- Notre-Dame Cathedral Basilica of Saigon
