= Joseph Phạm Văn Thiên =

Vietnamese Roman Catholic prelate (1907–1997)

His Excellency, The Most Reverend Joseph Phạm Văn Thiên
- Bishop of Phú Cường
- Native name: Giuse Phạm Văn Thiên
- Province: Sài Gòn
- See: Phú Cường
- Appointed: 14 October 1965
- Installed: 12 January 1966
- Term ended: 10 May 1993
- Predecessor: Diocese erected
- Successor: Louis Hà Kim Danh

Orders
- Ordination: 17 March 1934
- Consecration: 6 January 1966 by Paul Nguyễn Văn Bình

Personal details
- Born: 2 May 1907 Đất Đỏ, Phước Tuy, French Indochina
- Died: 25 February 1997 (aged 89) Bình Dương, Việt Nam
- Motto: Gratia Dei mecum (The grace of God with me) (Ơn Chúa ở cùng tôi)

Joseph Phạm Văn Thiên (2 May 1907 – 25 February 1997) was a Vietnamese Roman Catholic prelate. He was bishop of Phú Cường from 1965 to 1993.

Catholic Church titles
Preceded by	Bishop of Phú Cường; 1965–1993	Succeeded by Louis Hà Kim Danh
