= List of cathedrals in Vietnam =

This is the list of cathedrals in Vietnam.

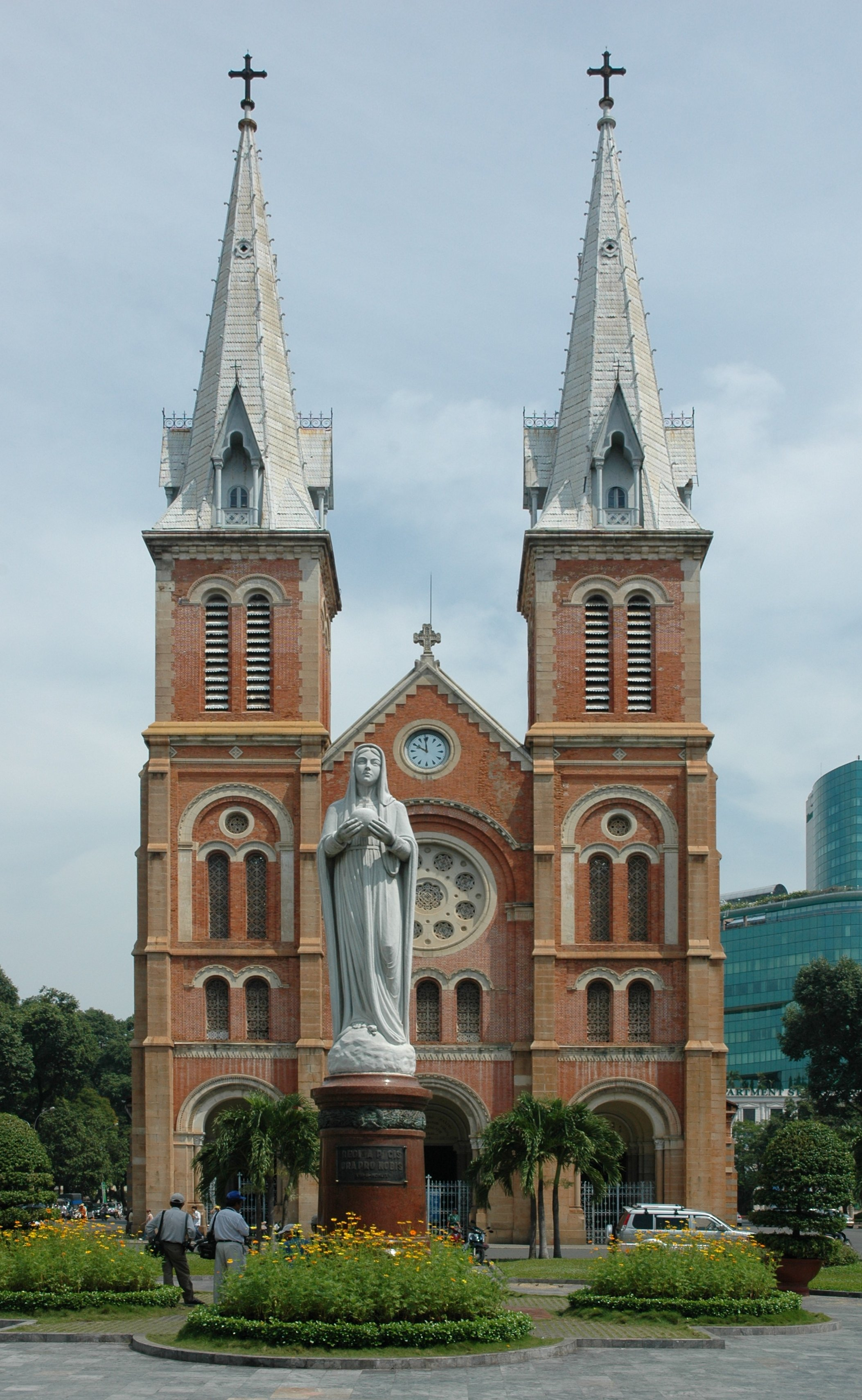
Immaculate Conception Cathedral Basilica in Ho Chi Minh City

== Catholic ==
Cathedrals of the Catholic Church in Vietnam:

- Mary Mother of God Cathedral in Bà Rịa of Bà Rịa diocese
- Queen of the Rosary Cathedral in Bắc Ninh of Bắc Ninh diocese
- Sacred Heart Cathedral in Buôn Ma Thuột of Buôn Ma Thuột diocese
- Queen of the Rosary Cathedral in Nam Định of Bùi Chu diocese
- Sacred Heart Cathedral in Cần Thơ of Cần Thơ diocese
- St Nicholas of Bari Cathedral in Da Lat of Đà Lạt diocese
- Sacred Heart Cathedral in Da Nang of Đà Nẵng diocese
- St. Joseph’s Cathedral in Hanoi of Hà Nội archdiocese
- Queen of the Rosary Cathedral in Hải Phòng of Hải Phòng diocese
- Immaculate Heart of Mary Cathedral in Huế of Huế archdiocese
- St. Therese of the Child Jesus Cathedral in Sơn Tây of Hưng Hoá diocese
- Immaculate Conception Cathedral in Kon Tum of Kon Tum diocese
- St Joseph’s Cathedral in Lạng Sơn of Lạng Sơn & Cao Bằng diocese
- Queen of Peace Cathedral in Long Xuyên of Long Xuyên diocese
- Immaculate Conception Cathedral in Mỹ Tho of Mỹ Tho diocese
- Christ the King Cathedral in Nha Trang of Nha Trang diocese
- Sacred Heart Cathedral in Phan Thiết of Phan Thiết diocese
- Queen of the Rosary Cathedral in Ninh Bình of Phát Diệm diocese
- Sacred Heart Cathedral in Thủ Dầu Một of Phú Cường diocese
- Assumption Cathedral in Quy Nhơn of Quy Nhơn diocese
- Sacred Heart Cathedral in Thái Bình of Thái Bình diocese
- Immaculate Conception Cathedral in Thanh Hoá of Thanh Hoá diocese
- Immaculate Conception Cathedral Basilica in Ho Chi Minh City of Saigon archdiocese
- Assumption Cathedral in Nghệ An of Vinh diocese
- St Anne’s Cathedral in Vĩnh Long of Vĩnh Long diocese
- Christ the King Cathedral in Long Khánh of Xuân Lộc diocese

== See also ==
- List of cathedrals
- Christianity in Vietnam
