= Juan Casado Obispo =

Spanish Roman Catholic prelate (1886–1941)

His Excellency Juan Casado Obispo OP
- Vicar Apostolic of Thái Bình
- Metropolis: Hanoi
- Installed: 9 March 1936
- Term ended: 19 January 1941
- Predecessor: -
- Successor: Santos Ubierna, OP

Orders
- Ordination: 29 January 1912
- Consecration: 2 August 1936 by Francisco Gómez de Santiago, OP

Personal details
- Born: 20 September 1887 Fuentecén
- Died: 19 January 1941 (aged 54)

Juan Casado Obispo (27 December 1886 – 19 January 1941) was a Spanish Roman Catholic prelate of the Dominican Order. He was appointed vicar apostolic of Thái Bình and titular bishop of Barata from 1936 to 1941. He died on 19 January 1941 at the age of 54.

Catholic Church titles
Preceded by -	Vicar Apostolic of Thái Bình; 1936–1941	Succeeded by Santos Ubierna, OP
Preceded by -	Titular Bishop of Barata; 1936–1941	Succeeded by Mihály Endrey-Eipel, SDB
