= Pierre Trần Đình Tứ =

Vietnamese prelate (born 1937)

The Most Reverend Pierre Trần Đình Tứ
- Bishop Emeritus of Phú Cường
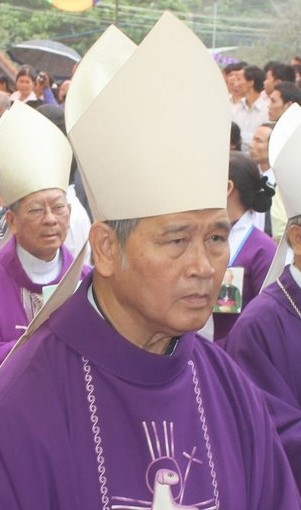
- Native name: Phêrô Trần Đình Tứ
- Province: Sài Gòn
- See: Phú Cường
- Appointed: 5 November 1998
- Installed: 26 January 1999
- Term ended: 30 June 2012
- Predecessor: Louis Hà Kim Danh
- Successor: Joseph Nguyễn Tấn Tước
- Other post: Head of Episcopal Committee on the Divine Worship

Orders
- Ordination: 29 April 1965
- Consecration: 6 January 1999 by Pope John Paul II

Personal details
- Born: 2 March 1937 (age 89) Thái Bình, French Indochina
- Denomination: Catholic
- Motto: Dilige et quod vis fac (Vietnamese: Yêu rồi làm) (English: Love and do what you will)
- Coat of arms

Pierre Trần Đình Tứ is a Vietnamese prelate. He is currently the Bishop Emeritus of Phú Cường and the Head of the Episcopal Committee on the Divine Worship.

== Biography ==
Tứ was born on 2 March 1937 in Thái Bình, Vietnam. In 1948, he went to My Duc Minor Seminary. From 1954 to 1957, he was sent to study philosophy in Hong Kong. After his return to Vietnam, he studied theology at Saint Joseph Major Seminary in Sai Gon (now Ho Chi Minh City) from 1961 to 1965.

On 29 April 1965, he was ordained a priest and served at parishes in Phú Cường diocese. In 1968, he was sent to Rome to further his studies and obtained a doctorate in canon law and bachelor's degree in liturgy. He then became the rector of a local major seminary from 1975 to 1988, and taught at Saint Joseph Major Seminary in Ho Chi Minh City, from 1987 to 1988.

On 5 November 1998, he was appointed Bishop of Phú Cường, the third bishop of this diocese. He was consecrated a bishop on 6 January 1999 in Rome by Pope John Paul II. He was one of the two Vietnamese bishops who got consecrated by the Pope in Rome, the other was Jean-Baptiste Nguyễn Bá Tòng, the first Vietnamese bishop.

On 30 June 2012, Pope Benedict XVI accepted Pierre Tứ's resignation due to age limit, and named Joseph Nguyễn Tấn Tước his successor.

== Notes ==
Catholic Church titles
Preceded by Louis Hà Kim Danh	Bishop of Phú Cường; 1998–2012	Succeeded by Joseph Nguyễn Tấn Tước
