= Joseph Trần Văn Toản =

Vietnamese Catholic prelate (born 1955)

The Most Reverend Joseph Trần Văn Toản
- Bishop of Long Xuyên
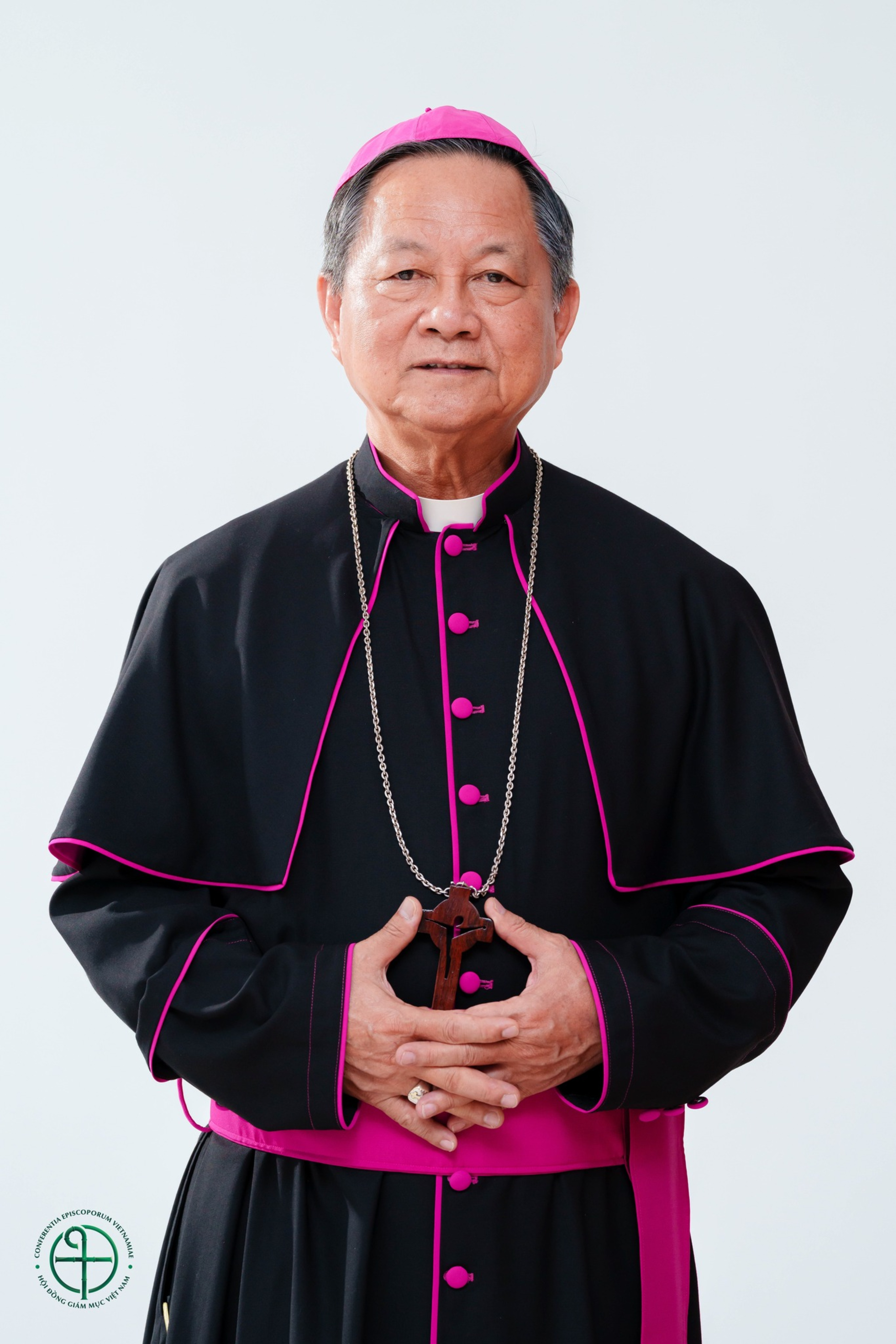
- Official portrait, 2024
- Native name: Giuse Trần Văn Toản
- Province: Sài Gòn
- See: Long Xuyên
- Appointed: 25 August 2017 (as Coadjutor)
- Installed: 23 February 2019
- Predecessor: Joseph Trân Xuân Tiéu
- Previous post: Auxiliary Bishop of Long Xuyên & Titular Bishop of Acalissus (2014–2017); Coadjutor Bishop of Long Xuyên (2017–2019)

Orders
- Ordination: 16 January 1992 by Jean Baptiste Bùi Tuần
- Consecration: 29 May 2014 by Joseph Trần Xuân Tiếu

Personal details
- Born: 7 April 1955 (age 71) Tam Kỳ, Quảng Nam, State of Việt Nam
- Denomination: Catholic
- Motto: Mea gloria est crux Christi (My glory is in the Cross of Christ) (Vinh dự của tôi là Thập giá Chúa Giêsu Kitô)
- Styles
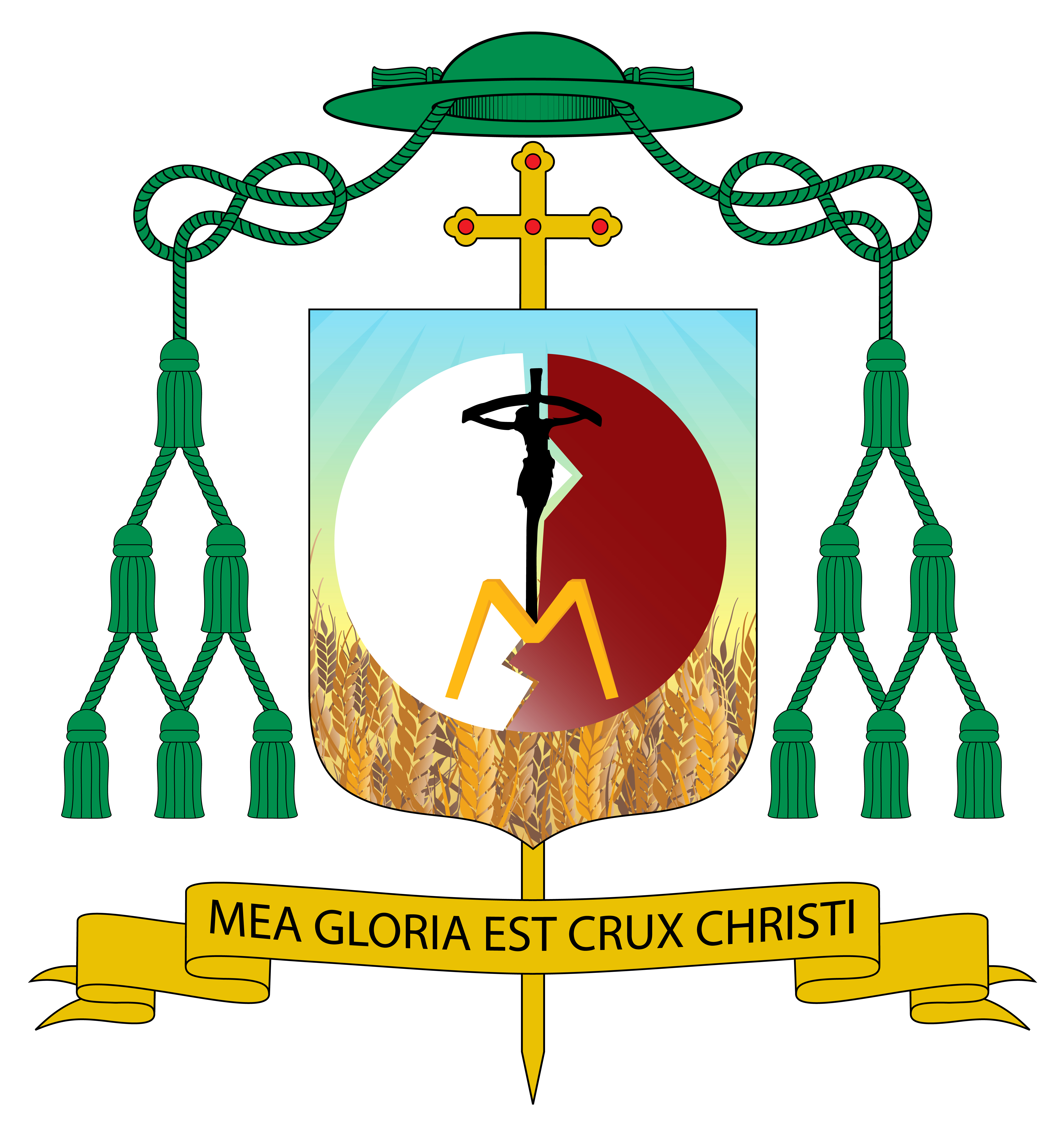
- Reference style: His Excellency; The Most Reverend
- Spoken style: Your Excellency
- Religious style: Bishop

Joseph Trần Văn Toản (born 7 April 1955) is a Vietnamese Catholic prelate who serves as the Bishop of Long Xuyên. He was previously an auxiliary bishop of the same diocese from 2014 to 2017 and then coadjutor bishop until 2019.

== Biography ==
=== Early life and education ===
Trần Văn Toản was born on 7 April 1955 in Tam Kỳ, Quang Nam Province, Vietnam. He began his religious studies at the minor seminary of Long Xuyên in 1966, continuing until 1974, and then at the major seminary until 1980. He served voluntarily in parishes in Môi Khôi and Thạnh Quới in the diocese of Long Xuyên for over ten years while awaiting government authorization for his ordination to the priesthood.

=== Priesthood ===
He was ordained a priest on 16 January 1992 by Bishop Jean Baptiste Bùi Tuần and served as a parish vicar in Môi Khôi until 1999. He then went to Manila to study at De La Salle University, obtaining a doctorate in education in 2005. Upon returning to Vietnam, he was appointed director of the pastoral center and coordinator of pastoral and missionary activities in the diocese of Long Xuyên, as well as rector of the minor seminary of Santa Teresa. He also served as a professor of missiology at the inter-diocesan major seminary of Cần Thơ.

=== Episcopal ministry ===
On 5 April 2014, Pope Francis appointed him auxiliary bishop of Long Xuyên and assigned him the titular see of Acalissus. He was consecrated a bishop on 29 May of the same year by Bishop Joseph Trần Xuân Tiếu. Three years later, on 25 August 2017, he was appointed coadjutor bishop of the same diocese. He succeeded to the governance of the diocese on 23 February 2019, upon the retirement of his predecessor. At the Vietnamese Bishops' Conference, he was elected president of the commission for laypeople for three consecutive terms since 2016.
