= Joseph Nguyễn Tấn Tước =

Vietnamese prelate (born 1958)

The Most Reverend Joseph Nguyễn Tấn Tước
- Bishop of Phú Cường
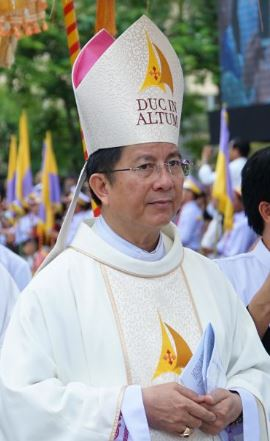
- Native name: Giuse Nguyễn Tấn Tước
- Province: Sài Gòn
- See: Phú Cường
- Appointed: 14 March 2011 (as Coadjutor)
- Installed: 30 June 2012
- Predecessor: Pierre Trần Đình Tứ
- Other post: Head of Episcopal Committee on Social Communications
- Previous posts: Coadjutor Bishop of Phú Cường (2011-2012)

Orders
- Ordination: 4 April 1991 by Louis Hà Kim Danh
- Consecration: 29 April 2011 by Peter Trần Đình Tứ

Personal details
- Born: 22 September 1958 (age 67) Bình Dương, Republic of Việt Nam
- Denomination: Catholic
- Residence: 444 Cách Mạng Tháng Tám, Thủ Dầu Một, Bình Dương
- Motto: Illum oportet crescere (Vietnamese: Ngài phải lớn lên) (English: He must increase)

Joseph Nguyễn Tấn Tước is a Vietnamese prelate. He is the current Bishop of Phú Cường and the Head of the Episcopal Committee on Social Communications.

== Biography ==
He was born on 22 September 1958, in Bình Dương, Vietnam. From 1971 to 1978, he studied philosophy and theology at local seminaries. On 4 April 1991, he was ordained a priest by Bishop Louis Hà Kim Danh, the second bishop of Phú Cường. In 1999, he was sent to France to continue his studies at the Institut Catholique de Paris until 2006. After returning to Vietnam, he worked at the Phú Cường diocese's Pastoral Center.

Pope Benedict XVI appointed him as Coadjutor Bishop of Phú Cường on 14 March 2011. He was consecrated a bishop by Bishop Pierre Trần Đình Tứ, the third bishop of Phú Cường, on 29 April that year.

He succeeded Bishop Pierre Trần Đình Tứ, who was retiring, to be the fourth bishop of Phú Cường on 30 June 2012.

== Notes ==
Catholic Church titles
Preceded by Bishop Pierre Trần Đình Tứ	Bishop of Phú Cường; 2012–now	Succeeded by incumbent
