= Santos Ubierna =

Spanish Roman Catholic prelate (1907–1955)

His Excellency Santos Ubierna OP
- Vicar Apostolic of Thái Bình
- Metropolis: Hanoi
- Installed: 24 February 1942
- Term ended: 15 April 1955
- Predecessor: Juan Casado Obispo
- Successor: Dominique-Marie Ðình Ðức Trụ

Orders
- Ordination: 20 December 1930
- Consecration: 1 May 1952 by Antonin Drapier

Personal details
- Born: 1 November 1907 Huérmeces, Spain
- Died: 15 April 1955 (aged 47) Saigon, State of Vietnam
- Motto: Immolor supra sacrificium

Santos Ubierna (1 November 1907 – 15 April 1955) was a Spanish Roman Catholic prelate of the Dominican Order. He was titular bishop of Lamdia from 1942 until his death and vicar apostolic of Thái Bình from 1942 to 1955. He died in Saigon on 15 April 1955 at the age of 47.

Catholic Church titles
Preceded by Juan Casado Obispo	Vicar Apostolic of Thái Bình; 1942–1955	Succeeded by Dominique-Marie Ðình Ðức Trụ
Preceded by Vacant	Titular Bishop of Lamdia; 1942–1955	Succeeded by Germán Villa Gaviria
