= Diocese of Long Xuyên =

Latin Catholic diocese in Vietnam

Coordinates: 10.3814°N 105.4398°E

Diocese of Long Xuyên Dioecesis Longxuyensis Giáo phận Long Xuyên
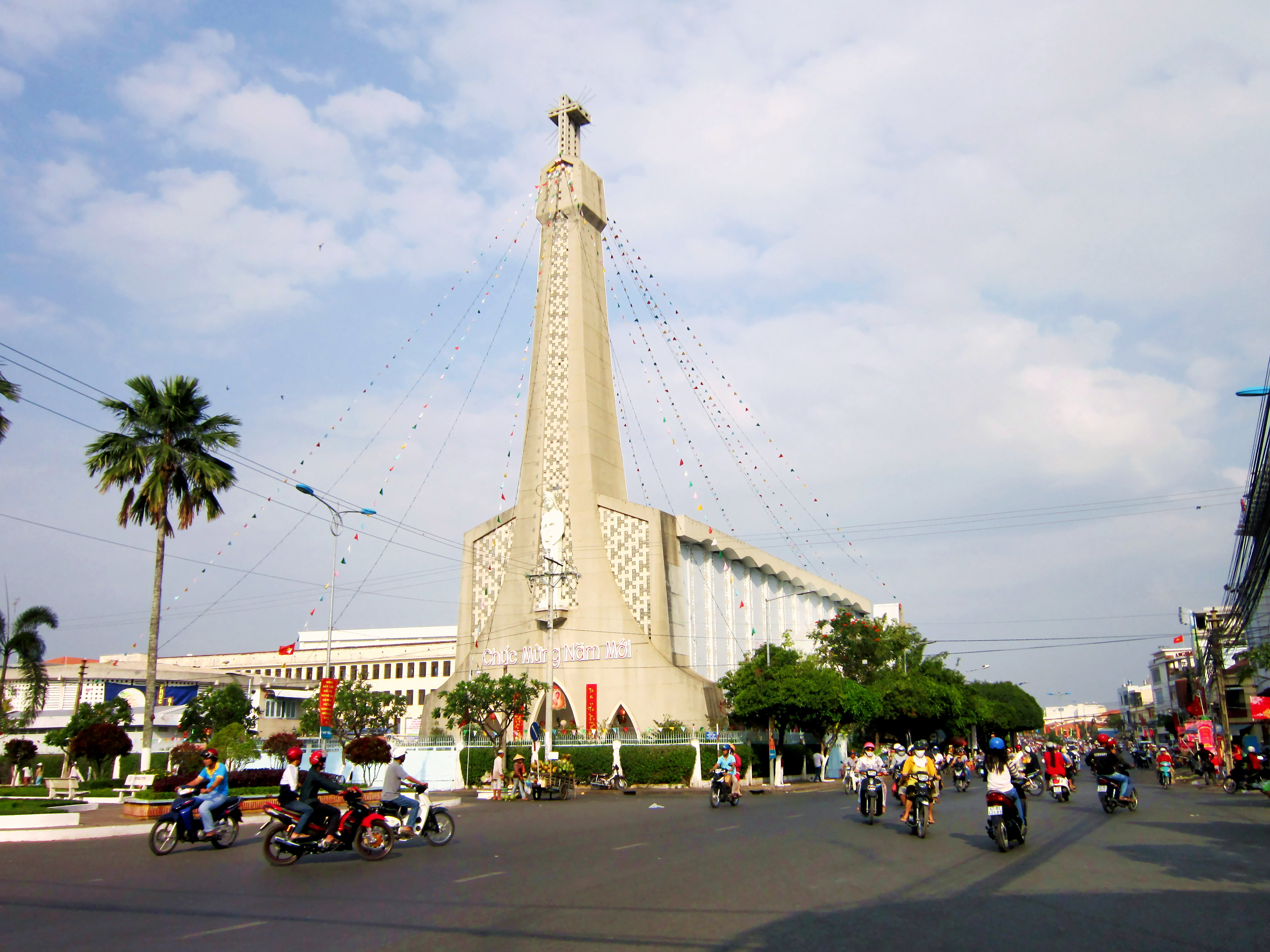
- Queen of Peace Cathedral

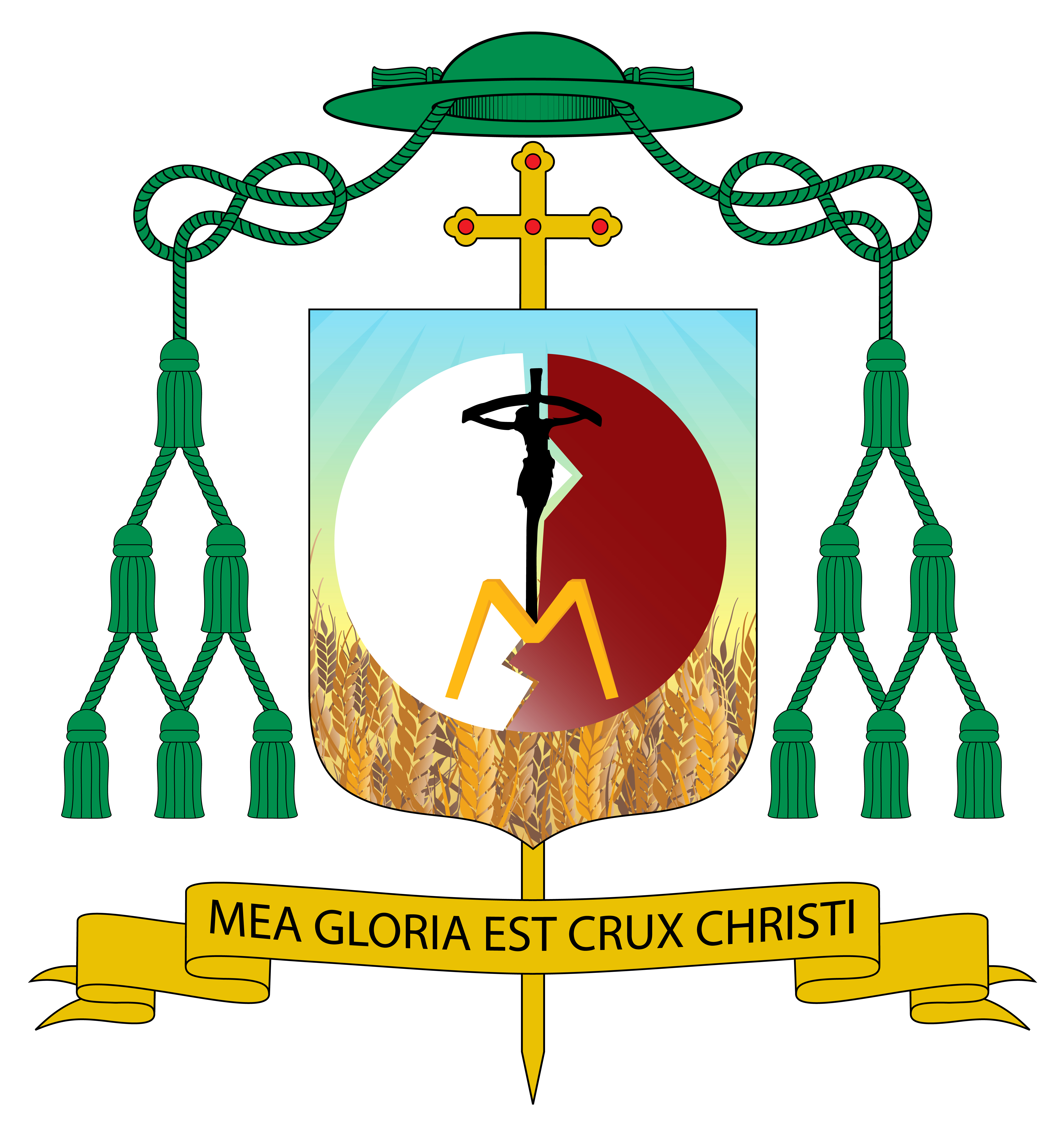
- Coat of arms of Bishop Trần Văn Toản

Location
- Country: Vietnam
- Ecclesiastical province: Sài Gòn

Statistics
- Area: 10,243 km^{2} (3,955 sq mi)
- Population: Total; Catholics: (as of 2021); 4,356,037; 233,018 (5.3%)
- Parishes: 164

Information
- Denomination: Catholic Church
- Sui iuris church: Latin Church
- Rite: Roman Rite
- Established: 24 November 1960
- Cathedral: Queen of Peace Cathedral, Long Xuyên
- Patron saint: Mary, Mother of God
- Secular priests: 285

Current leadership
- Pope: Leo XIV
- Bishop: Joseph Trần Văn Toản
- Metropolitan Archbishop: Joseph Nguyễn Năng

Website
- Website of the Diocese

The diocese of Long Xuyên (Latin: Dioecesis Longxuyensis) is a Latin Catholic diocese of Vietnam. The current bishop is Joseph Trần Văn Toản, since 2019.

The creation of the diocese in present form was declared November 24, 1960.

The diocese covers an area of 10,243 km², and is a suffragan diocese of the Archdiocese of Ho Chi Minh city.

By 2016, the diocese of Long Xuyên had about 247,000 believers (5.9% of the population), 275 priests and 186 parishes.

Queen of Peace Cathedral in Long Xuyên town has been assigned as the cathedral of the diocese.

== Bishops ==
=== Bishops of Long Xuyên ===
1. Michel Nguyễn Khắc Ngữ (24 November 1960 - 30 December 1997)
2. Jean Baptiste Bùi Tuần (30 December 1997 - 2 October 2003)
3. Joseph Trần Xuân Tiếu (2 October 2003 - 23 February 2019)
4. Joseph Trần Văn Toản (23 February 2019 - present)

=== Coadjutor Bishops ===
- Jean Baptiste Bùi Tuần (15 April 1975 - 30 December 1997)
- Joseph Trần Xuân Tiếu (3 June 1999 - 2 October 2003)
- Joseph Trần Văn Toản (25 August 2017 - 23 February 2019)

=== Auxiliary Bishops ===
- Joseph Trần Văn Toản (5 April 2014 - 25 August 2017), appointed Coadjutor Bishop and succeeded as Bishop here

=== Other secular clergy who became bishops ===
- Dominique Nguyễn Văn Lãng (incardinated here in 1960), appointed Bishop of Xuân Lộc in 1974
- Joseph Ngô Quang Kiệt, appointed Bishop of Lạng Sơn and Cao Bằng in 1999 and later Apostolic Administrator and Archbishop of Hà Nội
