= Diocese of Phú Cường =

Roman Catholic diocese in Vietnam

Diocese of Phú Cường Dioecesis Phucuongensis Giáo phận Phú Cường
- Coat of arms of Bishop Joseph Nguyễn Tấn Tước

Location
- Country: Vietnam
- Ecclesiastical province: Hồ Chi Minh City

Statistics
- Area: 10,855 km^{2} (4,191 sq mi)
- Population: Total; Catholics: (as of 2021); 4,381,206; 141,239 (3.8%)
- Parishes: 112

Information
- Denomination: Catholic
- Sui iuris church: Latin Church
- Rite: Roman Rite
- Established: 14 October 1965
- Cathedral: Cathedral of the Sacred Heart in Thủ Dầu Một
- Patron saint: Sacred Heart
- Secular priests: 147

Current leadership
- Pope: Leo XIV
- Bishop: Joseph Nguyễn Tấn Tước
- Metropolitan Archbishop: Joseph Nguyễn Năng
- Bishops emeritus: Peter Trần Đình Tứ

Website
- giaophanphucuong.org

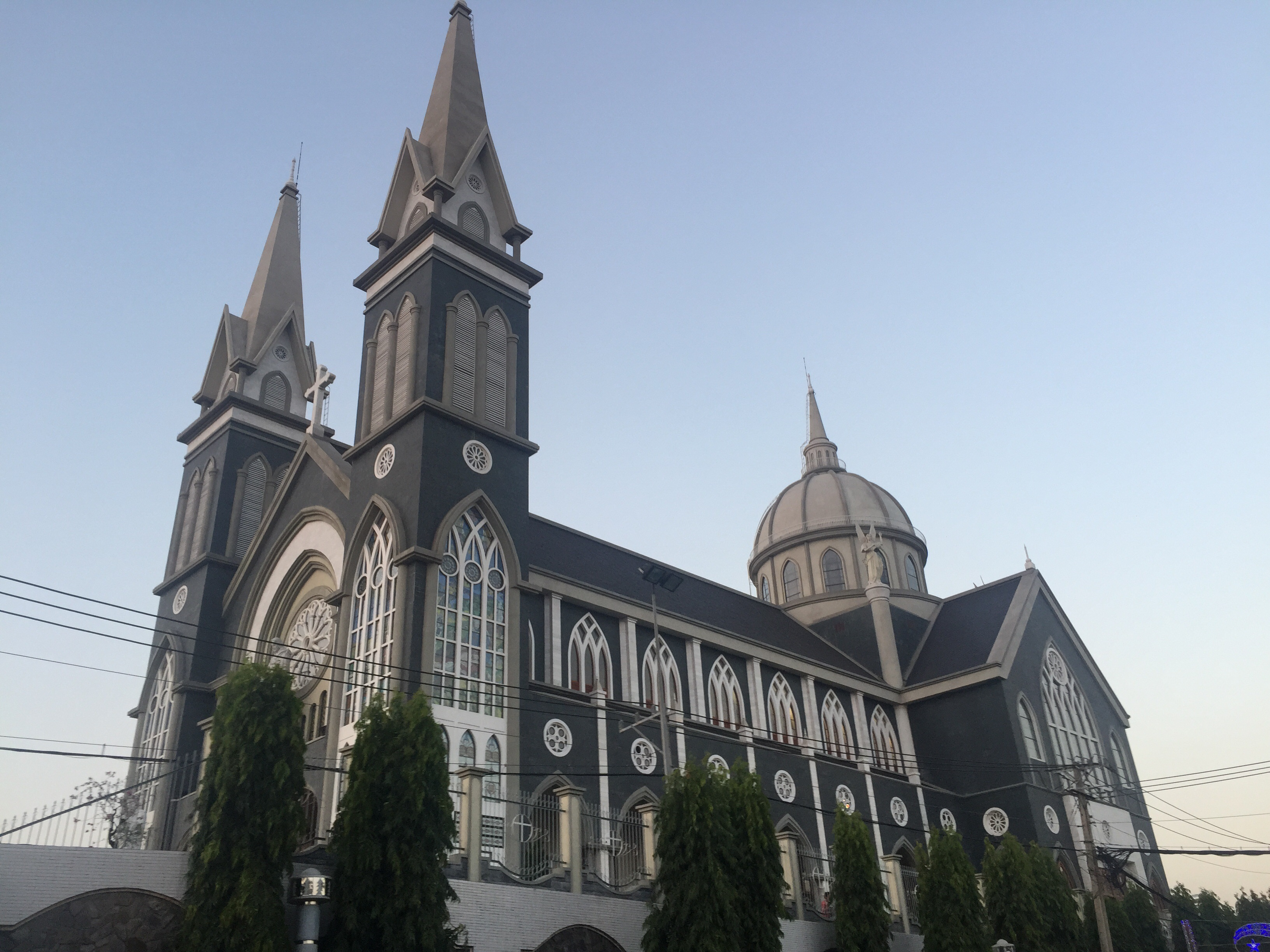

The Diocese of Phú Cường (Latin: Dioecesis Phucuongensis) is a Roman Catholic diocese in southern Vietnam. Since 2012 the bishop of the diocese has been Joseph Nguyễn Tấn Tước. The diocese in its present form was founded on October 14, 1965. By 2013, the diocese of Phú Cường had about 141,239 Catholics (4.8% of the population), 161 priests and 96 parishes.

The diocese covers an area of 10,855 km², and is a suffragan diocese of the Archdiocese of Ho Chi Minh city.

Sacred Heart Cathedral in Thủ Dầu Một City is the cathedral of the diocese.

== Bishops ==
=== Bishops of Phú Cường ===
1. Joseph Phạm Văn Thiên (14 October 1965 – 10 May 1993)
2. Louis Hà Kim Danh (10 May 1993 – 22 February 1995)
3. Peter Trần Đình Tứ (5 November 1998 – 30 June 2012)
4. Joseph Nguyễn Tấn Tước (30 June 2012 – present)

=== Coadjutor Bishops ===
- Jacques Huỳnh Văn Của (22 February 1976 - 9 January 1995), did not succeed to the see (retired)
- Louis Hà Kim Danh (8 June 1982 – 10 May 1993)
- Joseph Nguyễn Tấn Tước (14 March 2011 - 30 June 2012)

=== Other secular clergy who became bishops ===
- Pierre Nguyễn Văn Tốt, appointed Titular Archbishop of Rusticiana and Apostolic Nuncio to Benin and Togo in 2002 (and later to Chad and the Central African Republic; Costa Rica; and Sri Lanka)
