= Louis Hà Kim Danh =

Vietnamese Roman Catholic prelate (1913–1995)

His Excellency, The Most Reverend Louis Hà Kim Danh
- Bishop of Phú Cường
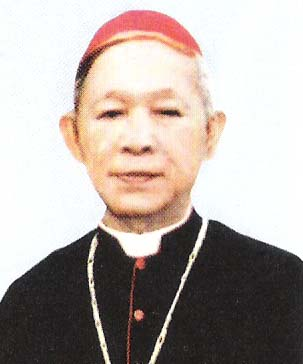
- Province: Sài Gòn
- See: Phú Cường
- Appointed: 8 June 1982 (as Coadjutor)
- Installed: 10 May 1993
- Term ended: 22 February 1995
- Predecessor: Joseph Phạm Văn Thiên
- Successor: Pierre Trần Đình Tứ

Orders
- Ordination: 12 March 1940
- Consecration: 10 October 1982 by Paul Nguyễn Văn Bình

Personal details
- Born: 21 June 1913 Cần Thơ, French Indochina
- Died: 22 February 1995 (aged 81) Hồ Chi Minh City, Việt Nam
- Motto: Patientia vincit omnia (Patience conquers all) (Kiên nhẫn thắng mọi sự)

Louis Hà Kim Danh (21 June 1913 – 22 February 1995) was a Vietnamese Roman Catholic prelate. He was bishop of Phú Cường from 1993 to 1995.

Catholic Church titles
Preceded by Joseph Phạm Văn Thiên	Bishop of Phú Cường; 1993–1995	Succeeded by Pierre Trần Đình Tứ
Preceded by —		Succeeded by —
