= François Xavier Nguyễn Văn Sang =

Vietnamese Roman Catholic bishop

- Bishop of Thái Bình
- Native name: Phanxicô Xaviê Nguyễn Văn Sang
- Church: Catholic Church
- Diocese: Diocese of Thái Bình
- In office: 3 December 1990 – 25 July 2009
- Predecessor: Joseph Marie Ðinh Bỉnh
- Successor: Pierre Nguyễn Văn Đệ
- Previous posts: Apostolic Administrator of Thái Bình (1990); Titular Bishop of Sarda (1981-1990); Auxiliary Bishop of Hanoi (1981-1990)

Orders
- Ordination: 18 April 1958 by Joseph-Marie Trịnh Như Khuê
- Consecration: 22 April 1981 by Joseph-Marie Trịnh Văn Căn

Personal details
- Born: 8 January 1932 Hanoi, Tonkin, French Indochina, French Empire
- Died: 5 October 2017 (aged 85) Thái Bình, Thái Bình province, Vietnam

François Xavier Nguyễn Văn Sang (8 January 1932 – 5 October 2017) was a Roman Catholic bishop.

Ordained to the priesthood in 1958, Nguyên Van Sang served as auxiliary bishop of the Roman Catholic Archdiocese of Hanoi, Vietnam, from 1981 to 1990. He then served as bishop of the Roman Catholic Diocese of Thái Bính from 1990 to 2009.

== See also ==
- Catholic Church in Vietnam
