= St. Erasmus Cave Church =

Ancient basilica and necropolis

Coordinates: 41.1407°N 20.7629°E

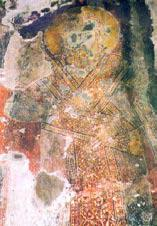
Fresco within the church

Saint Erasmus (Macedonian: Свети Еразмо, transliterated) Sveti Erazmo) is an ancient Christian basilica and necropolis located near Ohrid, North Macedonia, along the Ohrid-Struga freeway. Archaeological excavations have uncovered a three-part basilica and a necropolis with 124 graves dating from the 6th and 12th centuries.
