= Jean Baptiste Bùi Tuần =

Vietnamese Roman Catholic bishop (1928–2024)

The Most Reverend Jean Baptiste Bùi Tuần
- Bishop of Long Xuyên
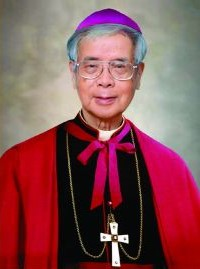
- Native name: Gioan Baotixita Bùi Tuần
- Church: Catholic
- Province: Sài Gòn
- See: Long Xuyên
- Appointed: 15 April 1975 (as Coadjutor)
- Installed: 30 December 1997
- Term ended: 2 October 2003
- Predecessor: Michael Nguyễn Khắc Ngữ
- Successor: Joseph Trân Xuân Tiéu
- Previous posts: Coadjutor Bishop of Long Xuyên and Titular Bishop of Tabunia (1975–1997)

Orders
- Ordination: 2 September 1955
- Consecration: 30 April 1975 by Michel Nguyễn Khắc Ngư
- Rank: Bishop Emeritus

Personal details
- Born: 24 June 1928 Cam Lai, Tonkin, French Indochina
- Died: 27 July 2024 (aged 96) Long Xuyên, Vietnam
- Denomination: Catholic
- Motto: Mandatum novum (A new command) (Giới luật mới)
- Coat of arms: Jean Baptiste Bùi Tuần's coat of arms

Styles of Jean Baptiste Bùi Tuần
- Reference style: His Excellency; The Most Reverend
- Spoken style: Your Excellency
- Religious style: Bishop

Jean Baptiste Bùi Tuần (24 June 1928 – 27 July 2024) was a Vietnamese Roman Catholic bishop who served as the bishop of the Roman Catholic Diocese of Long Xuyên from 1997 to 2003.

== Biography ==
Jean Baptiste Bùi Tuần was born on 24 June 1928 in the commune of Cam Lai, now Đông Cơ, Tiền Hải District, Thai Binh Province, Vietnam, to poor but devout peasant parents.

Bishop Jean-Baptiste Bùi Tuần died in Long Xuyên, Vietnam on 27 July 2024, at the age of 96.

== Education and Priesthood ==
In 1954, following the division of Vietnam, he fled to Hong Kong, where he was ordained a priest on 2 September 1955. He returned to southern Vietnam and was sent to Rome for further studies. After obtaining a bachelor's degree in philosophy, he was sent to Switzerland, where he earned a doctorate in philosophy, and completed his studies in Germany. Upon returning to his homeland, he was appointed director of the major seminary of Long Xuyên and a teacher at the seminary in Rạch Giá. In the following years, he dedicated his pastoral service to caring for refugees amidst the backdrop of the civil war.

== Episcopal ministry ==
On 15 April 1975, Pope Paul VI appointed him as the coadjutor bishop of the Roman Catholic Diocese of Long Xuyên. He was consecrated a bishop on 30 April of the same year by Bishop Michael Nguyễn Khắc Ngữ, almost in secret while the Vietnam People's Army captured Saigon and Vietnam was reunified under the Communist government of Hanoi. He succeeded to the same position on 30 December 1997, and remained in office for almost six years until his retirement due to age limits on 2 October 2003. He is also known in his homeland for his activity as a writer, having published several texts and collections of poems, as well as his main work Thao thức (translatable as "Restlessness"), a series of five volumes published in 2007.

== Episcopal lineage and apostolic succession ==
The episcopal lineage is:

- Patriarch Eliya XII Denha
- Patriarch Yohannan VIII Hormizd
- Bishop Yohannan Gabriel
- Archbishop Augustine Hindi
- Patriarch Joseph VI Audo
- Patriarch Eliya XIV Abulyonan
- Patriarch Yousef VI Emmanuel II Thomas
- Bishop François David
- Archbishop Antonin-Fernand Drapier, O.P.
- Archbishop Pierre Martin Ngô Đình Thục
- Bishop Michel Nguyễn Khắc Ngư
- Bishop Jean Baptiste Bùi Tuần

The apostolic succession is:

- Bishop Joseph Trần Xuân Tiếu (1999)
- Archbishop Joseph Ngô Quang Kiệt (1999)

Catholic Church titles
Preceded by Nguyễn Khắc Ngư	Bishop of Long Xuyên; 1997–2003	Succeeded by Joseph Trần Xuân Tiếu
Preceded by José Eduardo Alvarez Ramírez	Titular Bishop of Tabunia; 1975–1997	Succeeded by Jerzy Mazur
