= Nguyễn Khắc Ngữ =

Vietnamese bishop (1909–2009)

The Most Reverend Michael Nguyễn Khắc Ngữ
- Bishop of Long Xuyên
- Native name: Micae Nguyễn Khắc Ngữ
- Church: Catholic
- Province: Sài Gòn
- See: Long Xuyên
- Appointed: 24 November 1960
- Installed: 4 April 1961
- Term ended: 30 December 1997
- Successor: Jean Baptiste Bùi Tuần

Orders
- Ordination: 29 June 1934
- Consecration: 22 January 1961 by Pierre Martin Ngô Đình Thục

Personal details
- Born: 2 February 1909 Vạn Đồn, Thái Bình, French Indochina
- Died: 10 June 2009 (aged 100) Long Xuyên, Việt Nam
- Motto: Christus in vobis (Christ be in you) (Chúa Kitô trong anh chị em)

Michel Nguyễn Khắc Ngữ (2 February 1909 – 10 June 2009) was a Vietnamese prelate in the Roman Catholic Church.

Ngư was born in Vạn Đồn, Indochina in 1909, and was ordained as a priest on 29 June 1934. He was appointed bishop of the newly created Diocese of Long Xuyên on 24 November 1960, and received his episcopal consecration on 22 January 1961. Ngư retired from the Diocese of Long Xuyên on 30 December 1997, at the age of 88. He died on 10 June 2009, at the age of 100. At the time of his death he was the third oldest living Roman Catholic bishop.
