= Diocese of Thái Bình =

Roman Catholic diocese in Vietnam

Coordinates: 20°26′N 106°20′E

Diocese of Thái Bình Dioecesis de Thai Binh Giáo phận Thái Bình

Catholic
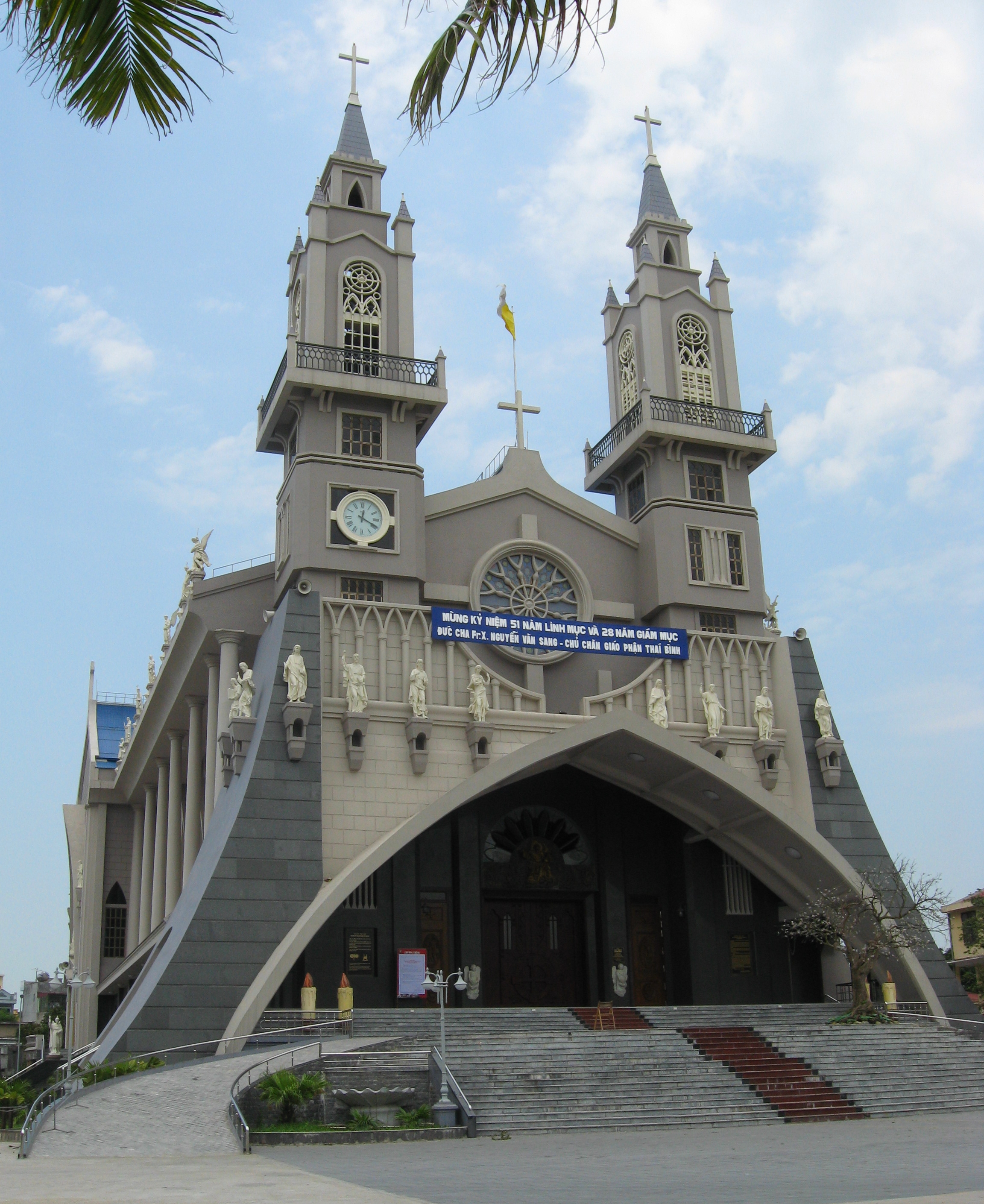
- Thái Bình Cathedral

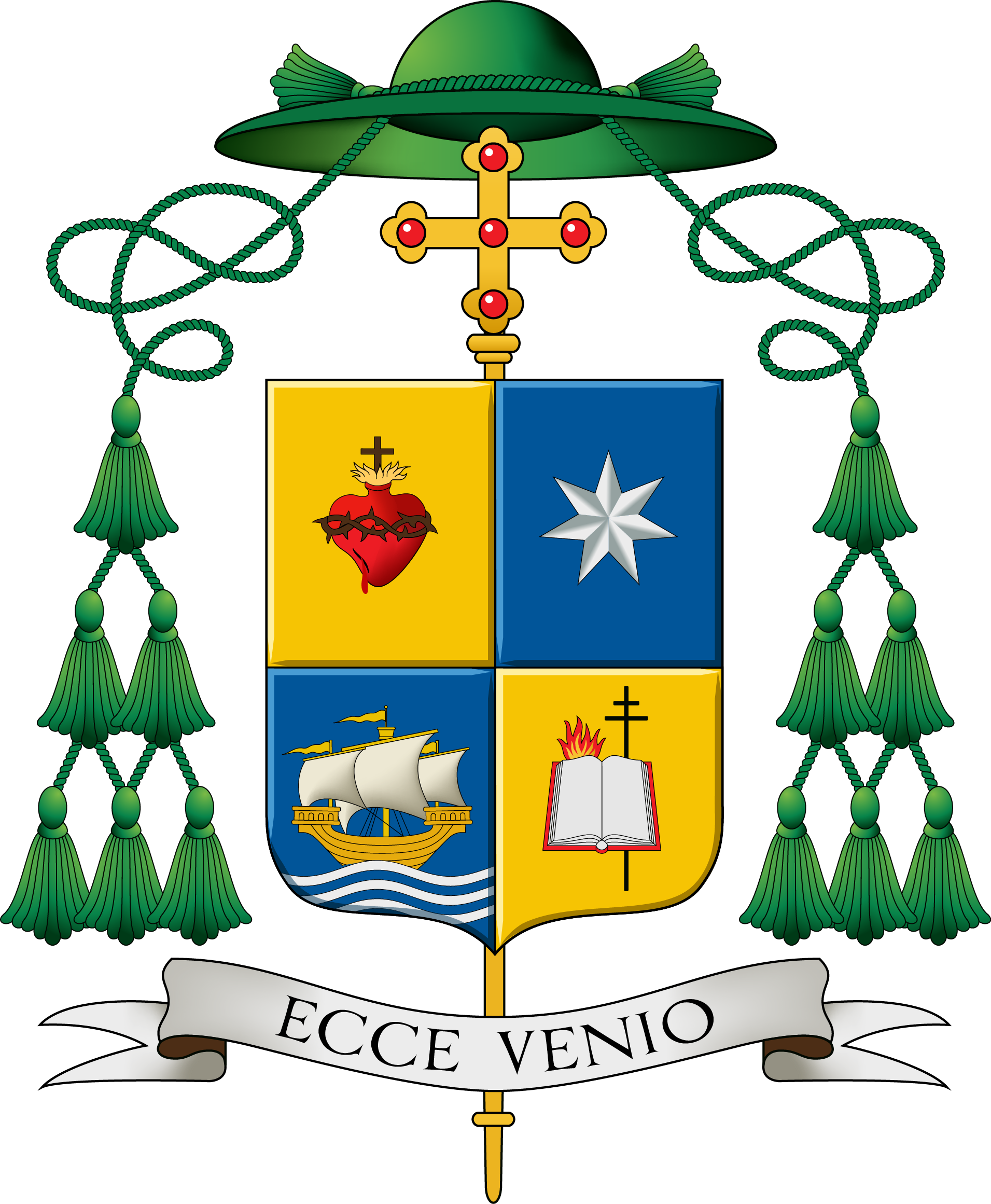
- Coat of arms of Bishop Cầu

Location
- Country: Vietnam
- Ecclesiastical province: Hà Nội

Statistics
- Area: 2,221 km^{2} (858 sq mi)
- Population: Total; Catholics: (as of 2022); 3,255,178; 141,259 (4.3%)
- Parishes: 135

Information
- Denomination: Catholic
- Sui iuris church: Latin Church
- Rite: Roman Rite
- Established: 9 March 1936 - Established as Apostolic Vicariate; 24 November 1960 - Promoted as Diocese
- Cathedral: Cathedral of the Sacred Heart of Jesus
- Patron saint: Sacred Heart of Jesus

Current leadership
- Pope: Leo XIV
- Bishop: Dominic Đặng Văn Cầu
- Metropolitan Archbishop: Joseph Vũ Văn Thiên
- Bishops emeritus: Pierre Nguyên Văn Dê SDB

Website
- Website of the Diocese

The diocese of Thai Binh (Latin: Dioecesis de Thai Binh) is a Roman Catholic diocese in northern Vietnam. The bishop is Dominic Đặng Văn Cầu, since 2022, succeeding Bishop Pierre Nguyễn Văn Đệ.

The creation of the diocese in its present form was declared on November 24, 1960.

The diocese covers an area of 2,200 km^{2}, and is a suffragan diocese of the Archdiocese of Hanoi.

By 2004, the diocese of Thai Binh had about 116,399 believers (4.1% of the population), 42 priests, and 64 parishes.

Sacred Heart Cathedral in Thái Bình town has been assigned as the Cathedral of the diocese.

In May 2008, the authorities returned the two-building compound My Duc seminary, built in 1936, to the diocese. The seminary, which now bears the name of the Sacred Heart, provides education for 33 Roman Catholic students.

== Ordinaries ==
=== Vicars Apostolic of Thái Bính (1936-1960) ===
Vicar apostolic		Period in office	Status	Reference
1	Bishop Juan Casado Obispo, O.P.	March 9, 1936 – January 19, 1941	Died in office	
2	Bishop Santos Ubierna, O.P.	February 24, 1942 – April 15, 1955	Died in office	
3	Bishop Dominique Ðinh Ðức Trụ	March 5, 1960 – November 24, 1960	Remained as bishop of Thái Bính	

=== Bishops of Thái Bính (1960-present) ===
Bishop		Coat of Arms	Period in office	Status	Reference
1	Bishop Dominique Ðinh Ðức Trụ		November 24, 1960 – June 7, 1987	Died in office	
2	Bishop Joseph-Marie Ðinh Bỉnh		June 7, 1987 – March 14, 1989	Died in office	
3	Bishop François Xavier Nguyễn Văn Sang		December 3, 1990 – July 25, 2009	Resigned	
4	Bishop Pierre Nguyễn Văn Đệ, S.D.B.		July 25, 2009 – October 29, 2022	Resigned	
5	Bishop Dominic Đặng Văn Cầu		October 29, 2022 – present	Current bishop	

Coadjutor Bishop of Thái Bính (1979-1982)

Coadjutor Bishop		Period in office	Reference
1	Bishop Joseph-Marie Ðinh Bỉnh	October 30, 1979 – June 7, 1982	
