= Catholic Bishops' Conference of Vietnam =

Assembly of Catholic bishops

Catholic Bishops’ Conference of Vietnam Hội đồng Giám mục Việt Nam Conferentia Episcoporum Vietnamiae
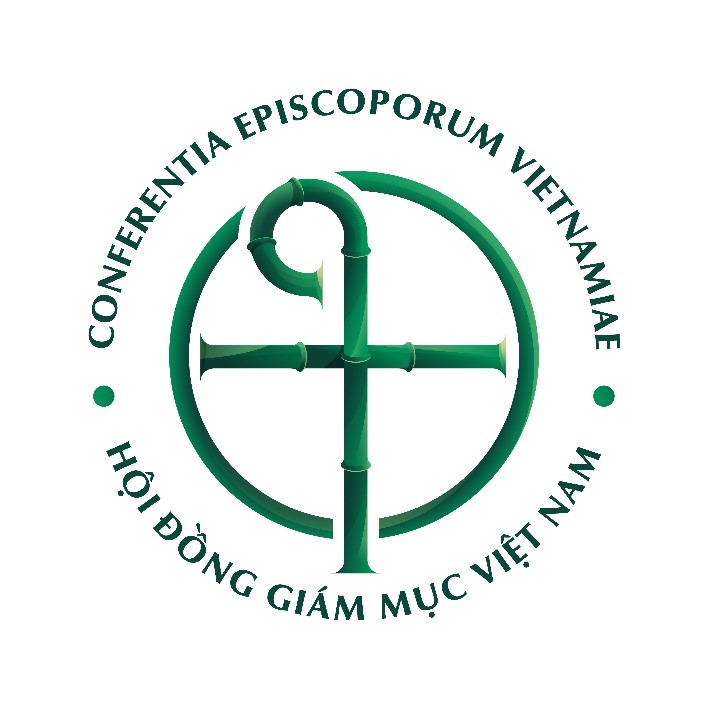
- Abbreviation: CBCV; HĐGMVN
- Formation: 1964 (for South Vietnam only); 1980 (for the reunited Vietnam)
- Headquarters: 72/12 Tran Quoc Toan, Vo Thi Sau Ward, District 3, Ho Chi Minh City
- Region served: Vietnam
- Official language: Vietnamese, Latin, English
- President: Joseph Nguyễn Năng
- Website: hdgmvietnam.com (Vietnamese)

The Catholic Bishops' Conference of Vietnam (abbreviated as CBCV; also known as the Episcopal Conference of Vietnam) is the episcopal conference of the Catholic bishops of Vietnam. Initially created in 1960s for South Vietnam, and officially re-founded in 1980 after the reunification of Vietnam, the CBCV is composed of all active and retired members of the Catholic hierarchy (i.e., diocesan, coadjutor, and auxiliary bishops) in Vietnam.

The current president of CBCV is Joseph Nguyễn Năng, Archbishop of Ho Chi Minh City.

== Organizational structure ==
The current Catholic Bishops' Conference of Vietnam for term 2022–2025 comprises the following committees:

=== Standing committee ===
- President: Joseph Nguyễn Năng, Archbishop of Hồ Chí Minh City
- Vice President: Joseph Vũ Văn Thiên, Archbishop of Hà Nội
- Secretary General: Joseph Đỗ Mạnh Hùng, Bishop of Phan Thiết
- Deputy General Secretary: Louis Nguyễn Anh Tuấn, Bishop of Hà Tĩnh

=== Programmatic committees ===
1. Committee on the Bible: Vincent Nguyễn Văn Bản, Bishop of Hải Phòng
2. Committee on the Catholic Education: Peter Huỳnh Văn Hai, Bishop of Vĩnh Long
3. Committee on Charitable and Social Actions - Caritas Vietnam: Thomas Aquinas Vũ Đình Hiệu, Bishop of Bùi Chu
4. Committee on Clergy and Seminarians: Joseph Đỗ Quang Khang, Bishop of Bắc Ninh
5. Committee on Consecrated Life: Peter Nguyễn Văn Khảm, Bishop of Mỹ Tho
6. Committee on Culture: Joseph Ðặng Ðức Ngân, Archbishop of Huế
7. Committee on the Divine Worship: Peter Kiều Công Tùng, Bishop of Phát Diệm
8. Committee on the Doctrine of the Faith: John Đỗ Văn Ngân, Bishop of Xuân Lộc
9. Committee on Evangelization: Dominic Hoàng Minh Tiến, Bishop of Hưng Hòa
10. Committee on Family: Dominic Nguyễn Văn Mạnh, Bishop of Đà Lạt
11. Committee on Integrity of Human Life: Joseph Nguyễn Đức Cường, Bishop of Thanh Hóa
12. Committee on the Laity: Joseph Trần Văn Toản, Bishop of Long Xuyên
13. Committee on Migration: Peter Lê Tấn Lợi, Bishop of Cần Thơ
14. Committee on Sacred Arts: Joseph Vũ Công Viện, Auxiliary Bishop of Hà Nội
15. Committee on Sacred Music: Dominic Đặng Văn Cầu, Bishop of Thái Bình
16. Committee on Social Communications: Dominic Nguyễn Tuấn Anh, Auxiliary Bishop of Xuân Lộc
17. Committee on Youth: Pierre Nguyễn Văn Viên, Auxiliary Bishop of Vinh
18. Committee for Ecumenical - Interfaith Dialogue: Joseph Châu Ngọc Tri, Bishop of Lạng Sơn and Cao Bằng
19. Subcommittee on Canon Law: Dominic Nguyễn Văn Mạnh, Bishop of Đà Lạt
20. Subcommittee on the Advisory of the Protection of Minors: Joseph Huỳnh Văn Sỹ, Bishop of Nha Trang
21. Subcommittee on Syndoality: Joseph Đỗ Mạnh Hùng, Bishop of Phan Thiết
22. Missionary Society of Việt Nam: Alphonse Nguyễn Hữu Long, Bishop of Vinh

Aside from committee roles, Bishop Joseph Bùi Công Trác assists Archbishop Thiên, Vice President of the Bishops' Conference, with financial management, and Bishop Peter Lê Tấn Lợi was elected Vice Chairman of the Committee on Migration at the first annual conference of the Bishops' Conference in 2023.

== List of presidents ==
- Paul Nguyễn Văn Bình (1966–1980)
- Joseph-Marie Trịnh Văn Căn (1980–1990)
- Paul Marie Nguyễn Minh Nhật (1990–1995)
- Paul Joseph Phạm Đình Tụng (1995–2001)
- Paul Nguyễn Văn Hòa (2001–2007)
- Pierre Nguyễn Văn Nhơn (2007–2013)
- Paul Bùi Văn Đọc (2013–2016)
- Joseph Nguyễn Chí Linh (2016–2022)
- Joseph Nguyễn Năng (since 2022)

== See also ==
- Catholic Church in Vietnam
- List of Catholic dioceses in Vietnam
