= Joseph Ðặng Ðức Ngân =

Vietnamese Catholic prelate (born 1957)

His Excellency, The Most Reverend Joseph Ðặng Ðức Ngân
- Archbishop of Huế
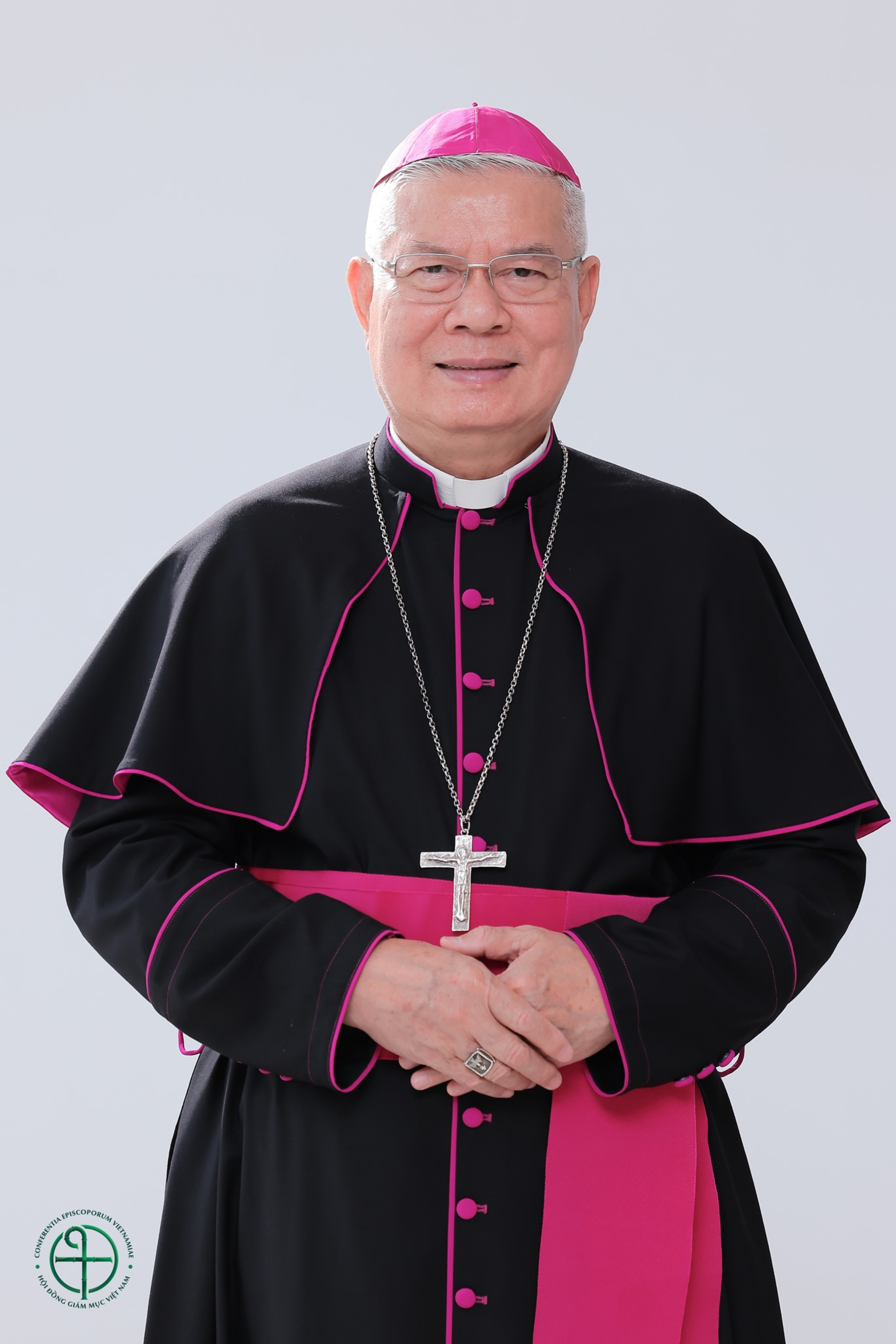
- Official portrait, 2024
- Native name: Giuse Ðặng Ðức Ngân
- Archdiocese: Huế
- Province: Huế
- Appointed: 21 September 2023; (as Coadjutor)
- Installed: 24 May 2025
- Predecessor: Joseph Nguyễn Chí Linh
- Other post: Apostolic Administrator of Đà Nẵng (2023–)
- Previous posts: Coadjutor Archbishop of Huế (2023–2025); Bishop of Đà Nẵng (2016–2023); Bishop of Lạng Sơn and Cao Bằng (2007–2016); Vicar General, Archdiocese of Hà Nội (2005–2007)

Orders
- Ordination: 8 December 1987 by Joseph-Marie Trịnh Văn Căn
- Consecration: 3 December 2007 by Joseph Ngô Quang Kiệt, Joseph Vũ Văn Thiên, and Stephanus Tri Bửu Thiên

Personal details
- Born: 16 June 1957 (age 69) Hà Nội, Democratic Republic of Việt Nam
- Education: Pontifical Urban University
- Motto: Ad gentes; (To the nations); (Đến với muôn dân)
- Styles
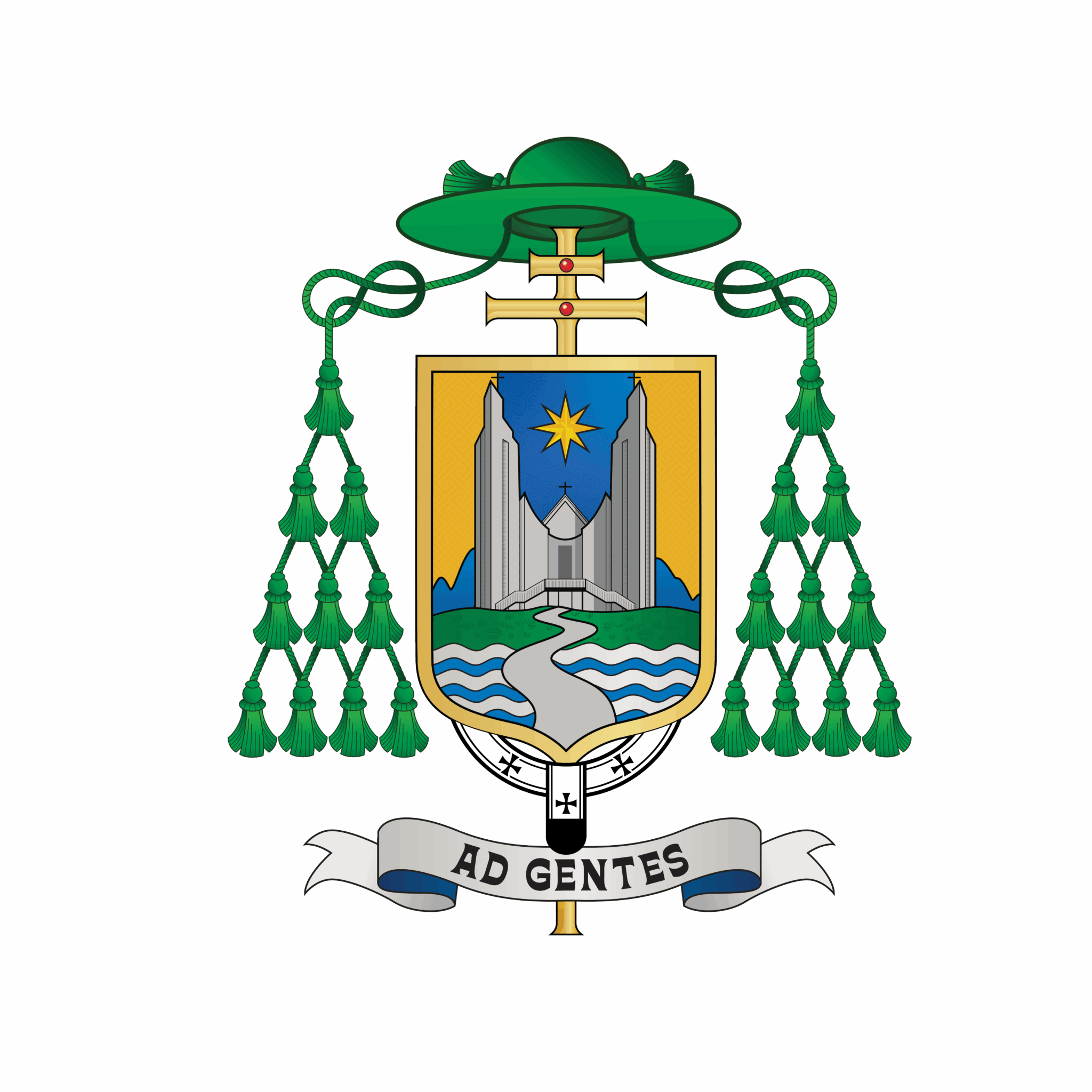
- Reference style: His Excellency; The Most Reverend
- Spoken style: Your Excellency
- Religious style: Bishop

Coat of arms of Bishop Ngân as Bishop of Lạng Sơn and Cao Bằng as well as later Đà Nẵng (2007–2023).

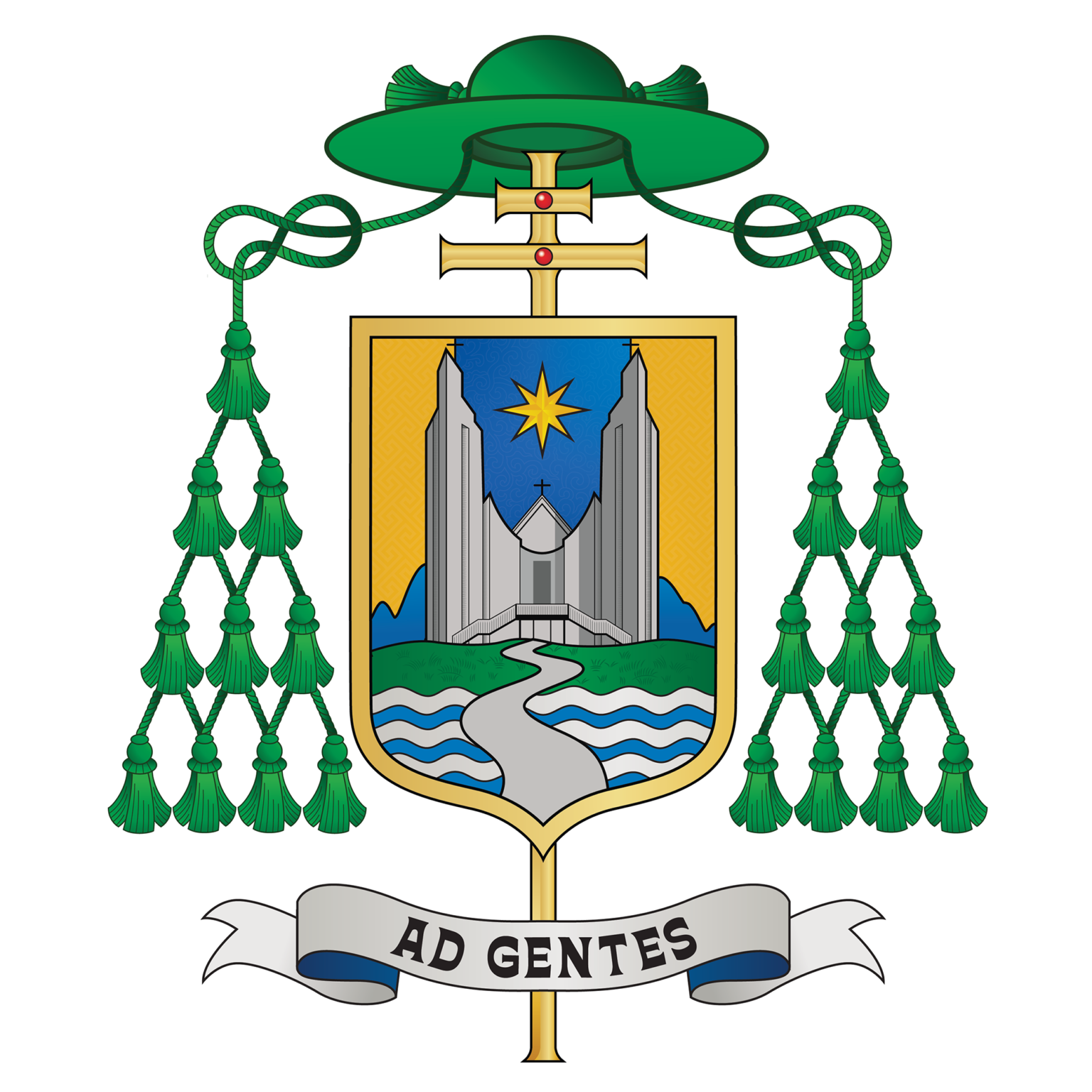
Coat of arms of Archbishop Ngân as Coadjutor Archbishop of Huế (2023–2025).

Joseph Ðặng Ðức Ngân (born 16 June 1957) is a Vietnamese Catholic prelate serving as the sixth Archbishop of Huế since 2025, previously Coadjutor Archbishop from 2023 to 2025.

He was ordained a priest of the Archdiocese of Hà Nội in 1987 and was vicar general of the archdiocese from 2005. He served as the third Bishop of Lạng Sơn and Cao Bằng from 2007 to 2016 and the fifth Bishop of Đà Nẵng from 2016 to 2023.

== Priesthood ==
He was ordained in 1987 for the Archdiocese of Hanoi by Cardinal Joseph-Marie Trịnh Văn Căn. After learning in Rome at the Pontifical Urban University, he became the secretary to both Cardinals Joseph-Marie Trịnh Văn Căn and later Paul Joseph Phạm Đình Tụng. He was appointed vicar general of the archdiocese by Archbishop Joseph Ngô Quang Kiệt in 2005.

== Episcopal career ==
=== Bishop of Lạng Sơn and Cao Bằng ===
On 12 October 2007, Pope Benedict XVI appointed him Bishop of Lạng Sơn and Cao Bằng and was consecrated bishop by Joseph Ngô Quang Kiệt on 3 December of that same year at Saint Dominic Cathedral in Lạng Sơn.

=== Bishop of Đà Nẵng ===
On 12 March 2016, he was appointed Bishop of Đà Nẵng with Bishop Joseph Châu Ngọc Tri becoming Bishop of Lạng Sơn and Cao Bằng by Pope Francis. This is the first time that two bishops have switched dioceses in the history of the Catholic Church in Việt Nam.

=== Coadjutor Archbishop of Huế ===
On 21 September 2023, he was appointed Coadjutor Archbishop of Huế, having the right to succeed Joseph Nguyễn Chí Linh and to aid Linh in his ministry.

=== Archbishop of Huế ===
On 24 May 2025, Ngân became the sixth Archbishop of Huế after Pope Leo XIV accepted the resignation of Joseph Nguyễn Chí Linh. He also received the pallium at Saint Peter’s Basilica in Rome by Pope Leo XIV in a ceremony started by Pope John Paul II that has not been seen in a decade.
