= Joseph Đỗ Quang Khang =

Vietnamese Catholic prelate (born 1965)

His Excellency, The Most Reverend Joseph Đỗ Quang Khang
- Bishop of Bắc Ninh
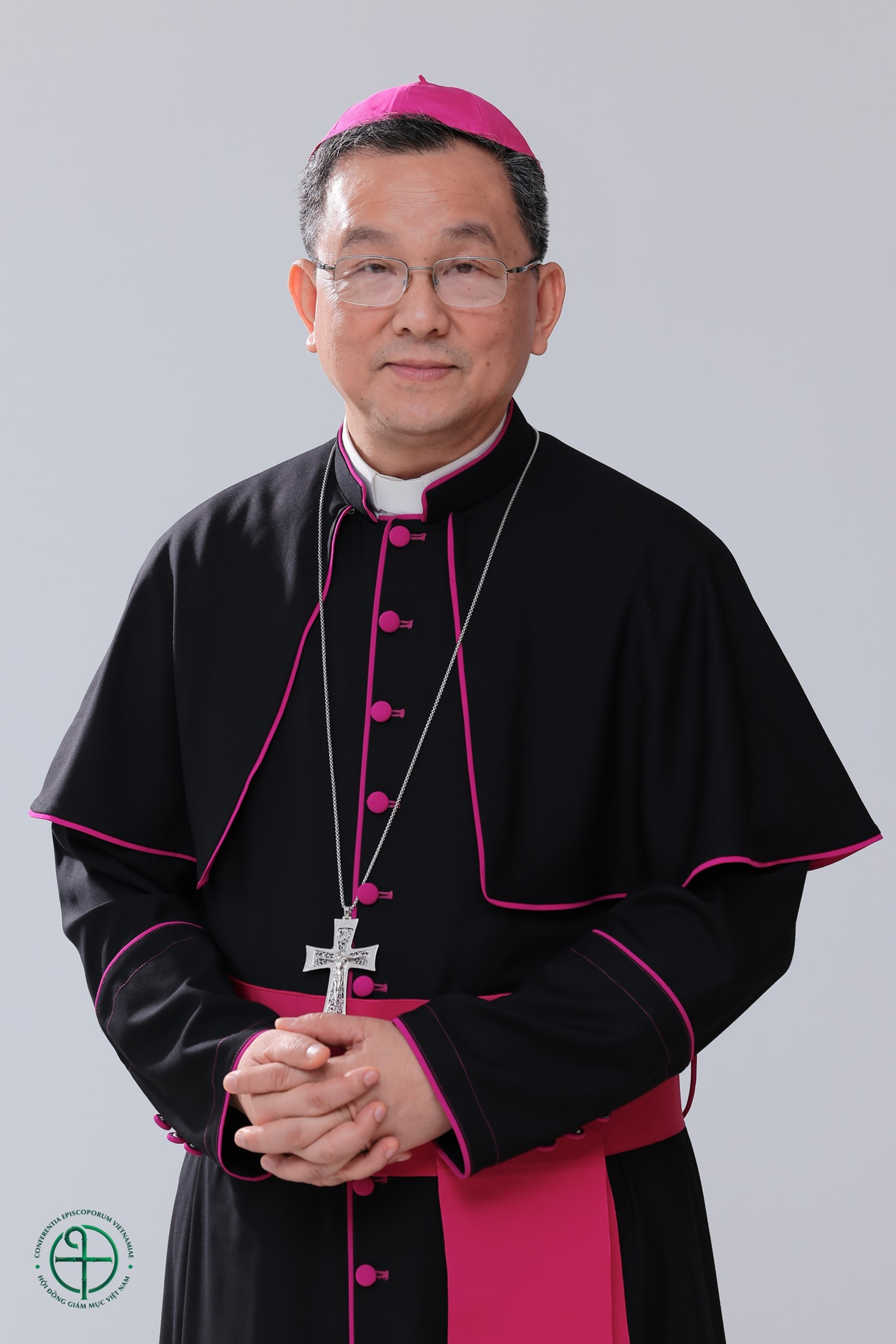
- Official portrait, 2024
- Native name: Giuse Đỗ Quang Khang
- Province: Hà Nội
- See: Bắc Ninh
- Appointed: 30 October 2021 (as Coadjutor)
- Installed: 17 June 2023
- Predecessor: Cosma Hoàng Văn Đạt SJ
- Previous post: Coadjutor Bishop of Bắc Ninh (2021-2023)

Orders
- Ordination: 30 June 1999 by Jean-Baptiste Phạm Minh Mẫn
- Consecration: 14 December 2021 by Cosma Hoàng Văn Đạt, Joseph Nguyễn Năng, and Joseph Vũ Văn Thiên

Personal details
- Born: 7 November 1965 (age 60) Thủ Đức, Gia Định, Republic of Việt Nam
- Education: Ho Chi Minh City College of Education; Saint Joseph Major Seminary of Sài Gòn; Catholic University of Toulouse; Pontifical Biblical Institute
- Motto: Occurrere – Auscultare – Discernere; (Encounter – Listen – Discern); (Gặp gỡ – Lắng nghe – Phân định)
- Styles
- Spoken style: Your Excellency
- Religious style: Bishop

Ordination history
History
Priestly ordination
- Ordained by: Jean-Baptiste Phạm Minh Mẫn
- Date: 30 June 1999
- Place: Notre-Dame Cathedral Basilica of Sài Gòn
Episcopal consecration
- Principal consecrator: Cosma Hoàng Văn Đạt SJ
- Co-consecrators: Joseph Nguyễn Năng; Joseph Vũ Văn Thiên
- Date: 14 December 2021
- Place: Front of Queen of the Most Holy Rosary Cathedral, Bắc Ninh

Joseph Đỗ Quang Khang (born 7 November 1965) is a Vietnamese Catholic prelate serving as the fourth Bishop of Bắc Ninh since 2023. He previously served as coadjutor bishop of Bắc Ninh from 2021 to 2023 and Secretary-General of the Catholic Education Committee under the Catholic Bishops' Conference of Vietnam.

== Biography ==
=== Early life and education ===
Đỗ Quang Khang was born on 7 November 1965 in Thủ Đức, Gia Định, Republic of Việt Nam to Giuse Đỗ Văn Cao and Maria Nguyễn Thị Tuyết. His parents are from Bắc Giang, belonging to the Diocese of Bắc Ninh, but moved to Saigon in 1954. He was baptized shortly after in the same month at Từ Đức Church in Thủ Đức. He was also later confirmed as an eight-year-old. He is the eighth of ten siblings and attended Nguyễn Hữu Huân High School in Thủ Đức from 1981 to 1983. He later attended Ho Chi Minh City College of Education from 1984 to 1987. After graduating, he joined the teaching faculty at Hưng Bình School in Thủ Đức a year later. In 1989, he became a volunteer at a farm in Hóc Môn for two years. He then entered Saint Joseph Major Seminary of Sài Gòn in October 1993 and graduated in June 1999.

=== Priesthood ===
Khang was ordained a priest on 30 June 1999 by Jean-Baptiste Phạm Minh Mẫn along with three future bishops at the Notre-Dame Cathedral Basilica of Saigon for the Archdiocese of Hồ Chí Minh City. (Note: Pope Francis appointed the following three as bishops who were ordained on 30 June 1999 by Archbishop Jean-Baptiste Phạm Minh Mẫn: Louis Nguyễn Anh Tuấn in 2017; Joseph Bùi Công Trác in 2022; and Peter Kiều Công Tùng in 2023.) Khang's first assignment after ordination was at Chợ Đũi Church of Sài Gòn deanery. After two years there, Khang was sent to the Catholic University of Toulouse, earning a master of arts in Biblical theology in 2006, and was also sent to Rome after, earning a licentiate in Sacred Scripture at the Pontifical Biblical Institute in 2010.

Upon returning to Vietnam, he became a resident priest of Saint Joseph Major Seminary of Sài Gòn and taught on the topics of the Synoptic Gospels, the Acts of the Apostles, and Biblical Greek. He became the dean of studies of the seminary in 2011 and then vice-rector in 2020. He also continued as a lecturer at the seminary, the Catholic Institute of Vietnam, Saint Joseph Major Seminary of Hà Nội, and for the institutes of various religious orders while keeping those roles.

=== Episcopal ministry ===
==== Coadjutor Bishop of Bắc Ninh ====
On 30 October 2021, Pope Francis appointed Khang as coadjutor bishop of Bắc Ninh. This appointment was one of the first in a period of three years and six months since the last episcopal appointment in 2018 by the Pope. It also marked the longest "waiting period" for an appointment since the period from 1982 to 1988. The appointment also came as a surprise to many because there were currently also four vacant sees in the ecclesiastical province of Hà Nội at the time.

At a gathering after the announcement, Khang expressed that he was apprehensive at first, but also expressed joy at the thought of an "ancestral homecoming" in a sense, since his family roots lie in the region. Also speaking at the gathering, Archbishop Joseph Nguyễn Năng of Hồ Chí Minh City stated that he offered "considerable encouragement" to accept the appointment.

==== Bishop of Bắc Ninh ====
On 17 June 2023, Francis accepted the resignation of Cosma Hoàng Vãn Ðat SJ. Khang subsequently became the next Bishop of Bắc Ninh as coadjutor bishop.
