= Pierre Nguyễn Văn Nhơn =

Vietnamese Catholic cardinal (born 1938)

His Eminence Pierre Nguyễn Văn Nhơn
- Cardinal, Archbishop Emeritus of Hà Nội
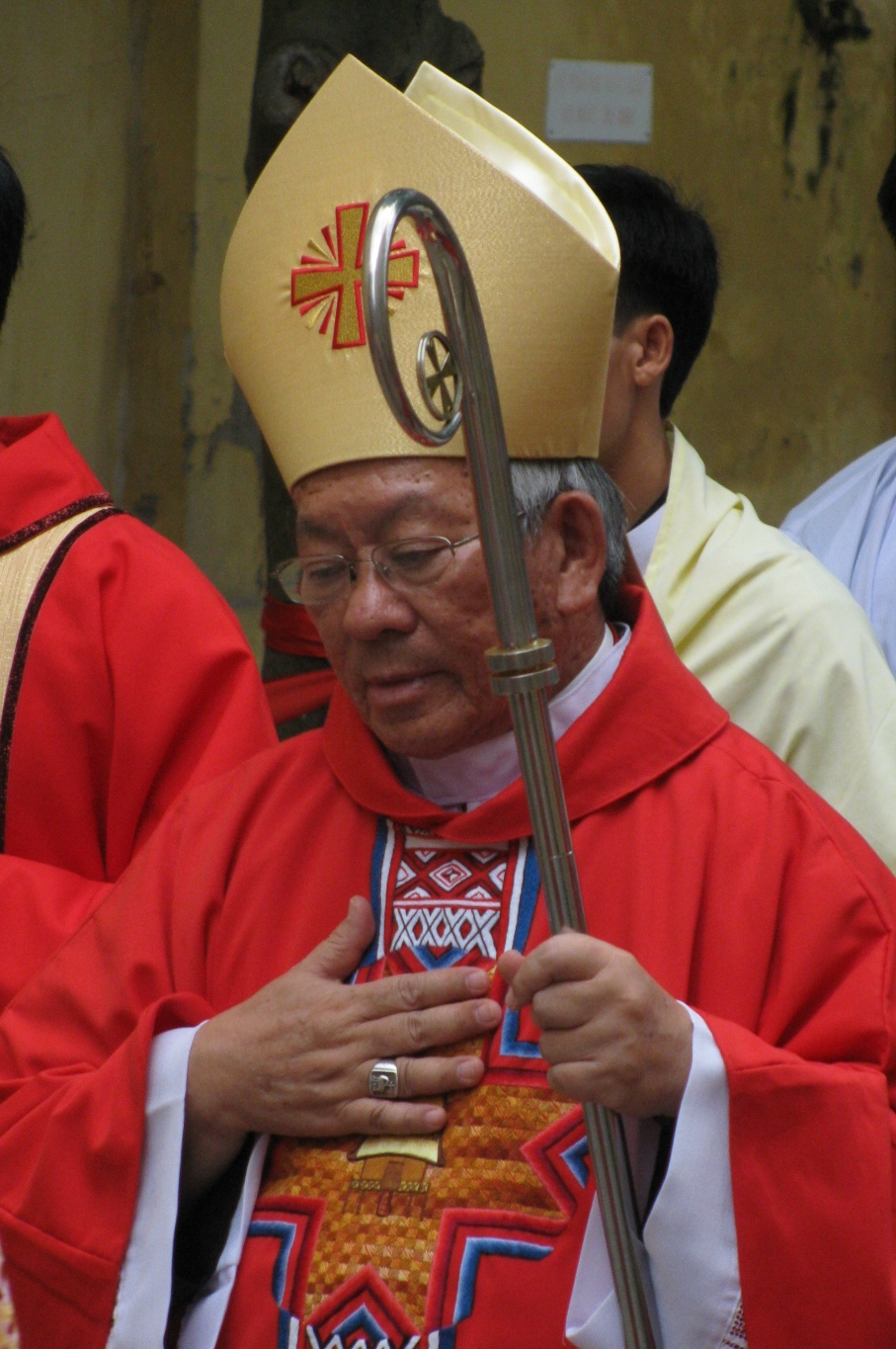
- Nhơn in 2010
- Native name: Phêrô Nguyễn Văn Nhơn
- Province: Hà Nội
- See: Hà Nội
- Appointed: 22 April 2010 (as Coadjutor)
- Installed: 13 May 2010
- Term ended: 17 November 2018
- Predecessor: Joseph Ngô Quang Kiệt
- Successor: Joseph Vũ Văn Thiên
- Other post: Cardinal Priest of San Tommaso Apostolo (2015–)
- Previous posts: Coadjutor Archbishop of Hà Nội (2010); President, Catholic Bishops' Conference of Vietnam (2007–2013); Bishop of Đà Lạt (1994–2010); Coadjutor Bishop of Đà Lạt (1991–1994)

Orders
- Ordination: 21 December 1967 by Simon Hòa Nguyễn Văn Hiền
- Consecration: 3 December 1991 by Barthélémy Nguyễn Sơn Lâm PSS
- Created cardinal: 14 February 2015 by Pope Francis

Personal details
- Born: 1 April 1938 (age 88) Đà Lạt, Lâm Đồng
- Motto: Illum oportet crescere (Latin for 'He must increase') (John 3:30)
- Styles
- Reference style: His Eminence
- Spoken style: Your Eminence
- Religious style: Cardinal
- Informal style: Cardinal

Ordination history
History
Priestly ordination
- Ordained by: Simon Hòa Nguyễn Văn Hiền
Episcopal consecration
- Principal consecrator: Barthélémy Nguyên Sơn Lâm PSS
- Co-consecrators: Paul Nguyễn Văn Hòa; Nicolas Huỳnh Văn Nghi
Cardinalate
- Elevated by: Pope Francis
Episcopal succession
Bishops consecrated by Pierre Nguyễn Văn Nhơn as principal consecrator
- Cosme Hoàng Văn Ðạt SJ: 2 October 2008
- Matthieu Nguyễn Văn Khôi: 4 February 2010

Pierre Nguyễn Văn Nhơn (born 1 April 1938) is a Vietnamese Catholic prelate who served as the fifth Archbishop of Hanoi from 2010 to 2018. A cardinal since 2015, he previously served as the third Bishop of Đà Lạt from 1994 to 2010, and the President of the Catholic Bishops' Conference of Vietnam from 2007 to 2013.

== Biography ==
Nguyễn Văn Nhơn was born in 1938 in Lâm Đồng, Vietnam. He was ordained a priest on 21 December 1967. On 11 October 1991, he was appointed Coadjutor Bishop of the Roman Catholic Diocese of Đà Lạt. On 3 December 1991, he was consecrated by Barthélémy Nguyễn Sơn Lâm. He succeeded as Bishop of Đà Lạt on 23 March 1994.

On 22 April 2010, he was appointed Coadjutor Bishop of Roman Catholic Archdiocese of Hanoi. On 13 May 2010, he succeeded Joseph Ngô Quang Kiệt as Archbishop of Hanoi.

On 4 January 2015, Pope Francis announced that Nguyễn would be created Cardinal-priest on 14 February. At that ceremony, he was assigned the titular church of San Tommaso Apostolo.

In April 2015 he was appointed a member of the Congregation for the Evangelization of Peoples and of the Pontifical Council for Justice and Peace.

Pope Francis accepted his resignation as Archbishop of Hanoi on 17 November 2018.

== See also ==
- Catholic Church in Vietnam

Catholic Church titles
| Preceded by Joseph Ngô Quang Kiệt | Archbishop of Hanoi; 2010–2018 | Succeeded by Joseph Vũ Văn Thiên |
| Preceded by Paul Nguyễn Văn Hoà | President of Catholic Bishops'; Conference of Vietnam; 2007–2013 | Succeeded by Paul Bùi Văn Đọc |
| Preceded by Barthélémy Nguyễn Sơn Lâm | Bishop of Đà Lạt; 1994–2010 | Succeeded by Antoine Vũ Huy Chương |
| Preceded by titular church established | Cardinal Priest of San Tommaso Apostolo | Succeeded by incumbent |
