= Laurent Chu Văn Minh =

Vietnamese Roman Catholic prelate (1943–2025)

Most Reverend Laurent Chu Văn Minh
- Auxiliary Bishop Emeritus of Hanoi
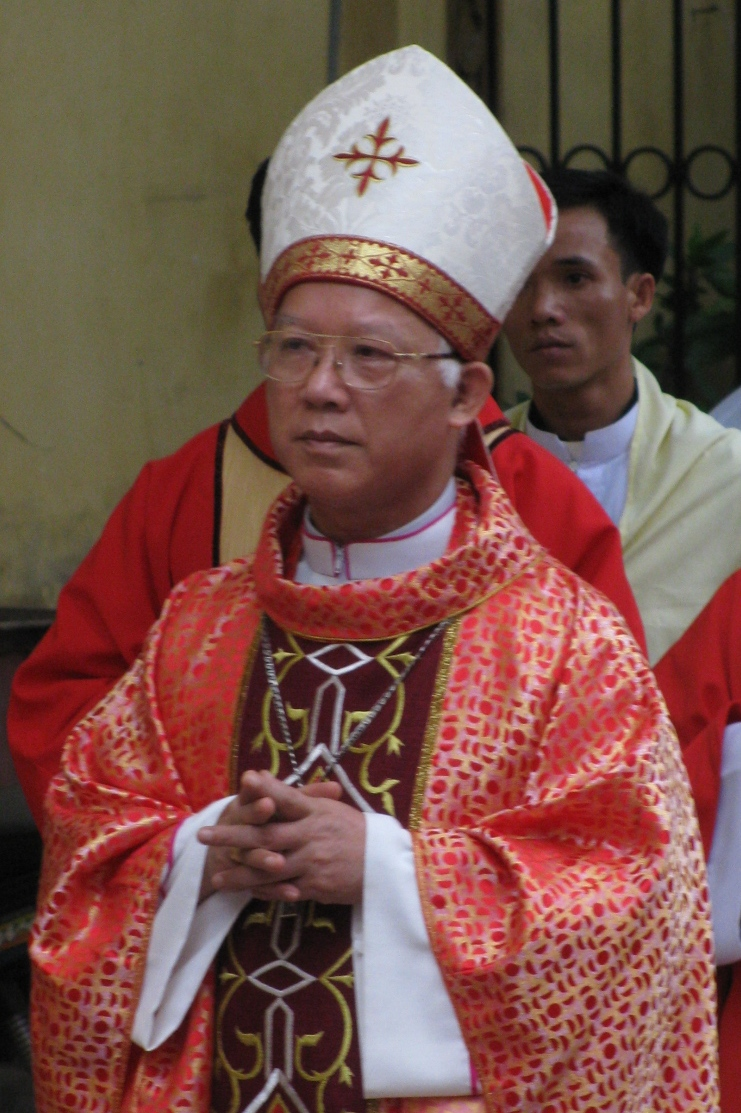
- Church: Roman Catholic Church
- Appointed: 15 October 2008
- Retired: 26 January 2019
- Other post: Titular Bishop of Thinisa in Numidia (2008–2025)

Orders
- Ordination: 10 June 1994 (Priest) by Paul Joseph Phạm Đình Tụng
- Consecration: 5 December 2008 (Bishop) by Joseph Ngô Quang Kiệt

Personal details
- Born: Laurent Chu Văn Minh; 27 December 1943 Nam Định, Tonkin, French Indochina
- Died: 4 August 2025 (aged 81) Hanoi, Vietnam
- Motto: Servientes in caritate

Laurent Chu Văn Minh (27 December 1943 – 4 August 2025) was a Vietnamese Roman Catholic prelate.

== Biography ==
Chu Văn Minh studied at St John Minor Seminary in Hanoi from 1956 until 1960. After he lived with his family, served his home parish of Nam Định and worked as a hairdresser for a living until 1992, when he was entered to study theology and philosophy at St Joseph Major Seminary in Hanoi. He was ordained a priest on 10 June 1994 and furthered his studies at the Pontifical Urban University in Rome, Italy, and obtained a doctorate in moral theology. After he returned to Vietnam in 2001, he taught at the major seminary and served as a member of the archdiocesan advisory council.

Pope Benedict XVI appointed him as the Titular Bishop of Thinisa in Numidia and an Auxiliary Bishop of the Roman Catholic Archdiocese of Hanoi on 15 October 2008 and his episcopal consecration was on 5 December that same year at an open-air ceremony in his native Nam Định by Archbishop of Hanoi Joseph Ngô Quang Kiệt.

Chu Văn Minh retired on 26 January 2019, due to age limits. He died at the bishop's residence in Hanoi, on 4 August 2025, at the age of 81. He's laid to rest at Nam Định Cathedral.

Catholic Church titles
Preceded by —	Auxiliary Bishop of Hanoi; 2008–2019	Succeeded by —
Preceded by Vincenzo Pelvi	Titular Bishop of Thinisa in Numidia; 2008–2025	Vacant
