= Joseph Nguyễn Chí Linh =

Vietnamese Catholic prelate (born 1949)

The Most Reverend Joseph Nguyễn Chí Linh
- Archbishop Emeritus of Huế
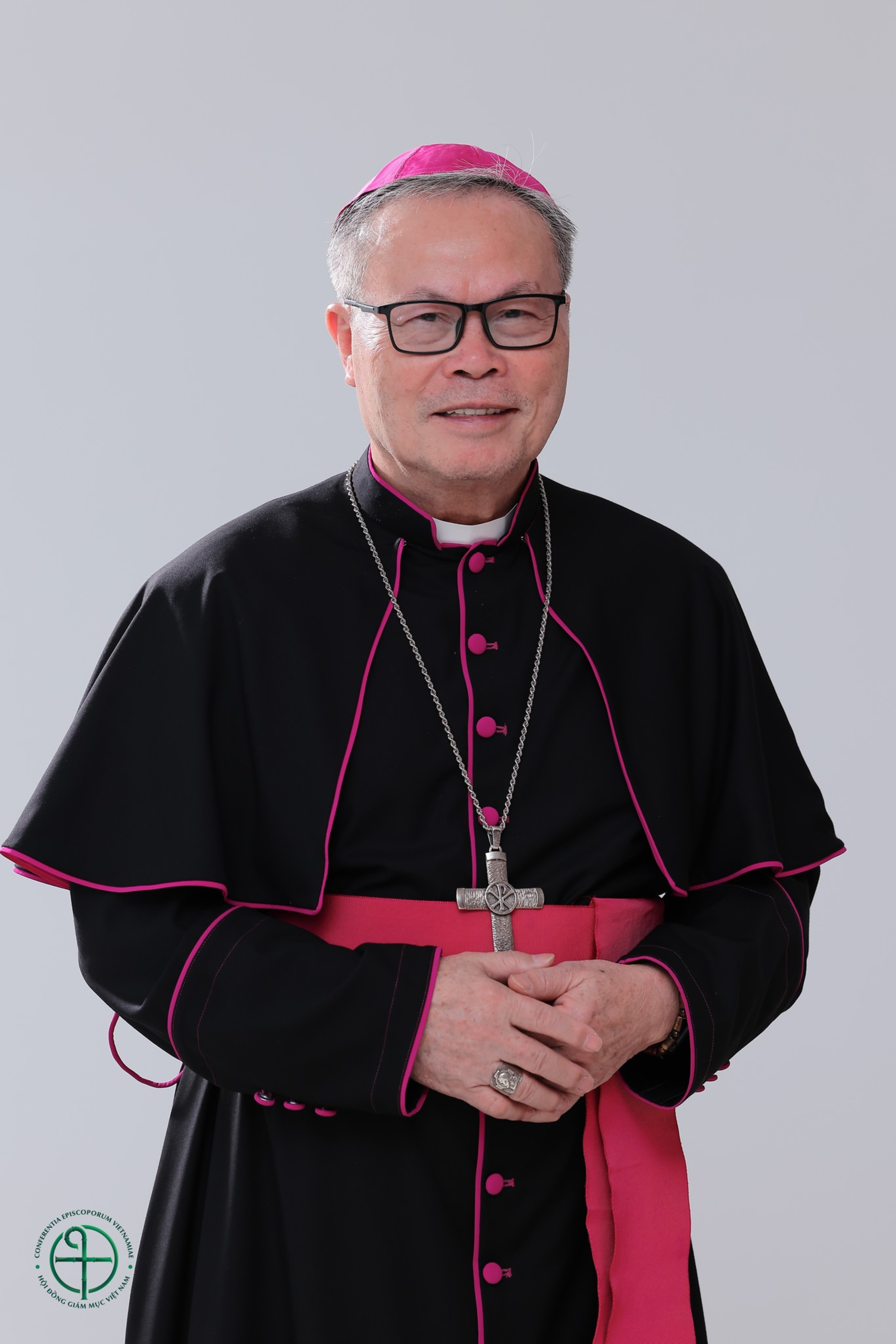
- Official portrait, 2024
- Native name: Giuse Nguyễn Chí Linh
- Church: Catholic
- Archdiocese: Huế
- Province: Huế
- Appointed: 29 October 2016
- Installed: 12 January 2017
- Term ended: 24 May 2025
- Predecessor: Francis Xavier Lê Văn Hồng
- Successor: Joseph Ðặng Ðức Ngân
- Previous posts: Apostolic Administrator of Nha Trang (2022–2023); Apostolic Administrator of Thanh Hóa (2016–2018); President, Catholic Bishops' Conference of Vietnam (2016–2022); Apostolic Administrator of Phát Diệm (2007-2009); Bishop of Thanh Hóa (2004–2016)

Orders
- Ordination: 20 December 1992 by Paul Nguyễn Văn Hòa
- Consecration: 4 August 2004 by Paul Nguyễn Văn Hòa, Joseph Ngô Quang Kiệt, Paul-Marie Cao Ðình Thuyên

Personal details
- Born: Nguyễn Chí Linh; 22 November 1949 (age 76) Hải Thanh, Tĩnh Gia, Thanh Hóa
- Education: Institut Catholique de Paris
- Motto: Ut unum sint (Note: His motto as written on the official coat of arms is Ut sint unum rather than Ut unum sint.) (That they may be one) (Xin cho họ nên một)
- Styles
- Reference style: His Excellency; The Most Reverend
- Spoken style: Your Excellency
- Religious style: Archbishop

Joseph Nguyễn Chí Linh (born 22 November 1949) is a Vietnamese Catholic prelate who served as the fifth Archbishop of Huế from 2016 to 2025. He previously served as the third Bishop of Thanh Hóa from 2004 to 2016 and as President of the Catholic Bishops' Conference of Vietnam from 2016 to 2022.

== Biography ==
Nguyễn Chí Linh was born in Ba Làng Parish, Hải Thanh, Tĩnh Gia, Thanh Hóa in what was then French Indochina, on 22 November 1949, the son of Lawrence Nguyễn Xuân Hòa and Martha Nguyễn Thị Thanh. The two, who were both from multigenerational Catholic families, were married in 1937 and had 4 sons and 6 daughters. While very young, he fled with his family, their fellow villagers, and most of the Christians of the region, who fled the area and reestablished Christian communities in the southern part of the country. He studied at the minor seminary Stella Maris of Nha Trang from 1962 to 1967, at the Provvidenza College in Hué from 1967 to 1968, at the Good Shepherd College in Nha Trang (1968-1970), and at the Pontifical College in Dalat from 1970 to 1977. From 1977 to 1992, while seminaries were closed in Vietnam, he returned to his family and worked at a variety of jobs while also serving an internship in the parish of Song My, Phan Rang, Ninh Thuan.

On 20 December 1992, he was ordained a priest of the Diocese of Nha Trang. He then worked in the parish of Phuoc Thien from 1992 to 1995. From 1995 to 2003, he studied at the Institut Catholique de Paris, earning a doctorate in philosophy with a thesis on Maurice Blondel. In November 2003, he returned to his home diocese in Vietnam and taught as a professor at the Seminary of Nha Trang.

On 12 June 2004, Pope John Paul II appointed him Bishop of Thanh Hóa. He received his episcopal consecration on 4 August of that year from Paul Nguyễn Văn Hòa, Bishop of Nha Trang. Within the Catholic Bishops' Conference of Vietnam, he headed the commission on the laity from 2004 to 2007 and the commission for the pastoral care of migrants from 2013 to 2015. (Note: In Vietnam, the issue of migration focuses on internal population movements, especially of younger workers from rural to urban areas, often in distant regions of the count, especially the south.) He was twice elected to a three-year term as vice-president of the Conference, serving from 2007 to 2013. The conference also elected him one of its two delegates to the 2008 Synod of Bishops on the Word of God in the Life and Mission of the Church. He was also Apostolic Administrator of Phát Diêm from 2007 to 2009.

On 29 October 2016, Pope Francis named him Archbishop of Huế and Apostolic Administrator of the Diocese of Thanh Hoa. He took possession of the Archdiocese on 12 January 2017. His responsibilities in Thanh Hóa ended with the installation of a bishop there in June 2018.

Linh was elected President of the Catholic Bishops' Conference of Vietnam on 5 October 2016, shortly before his transfer to Hue. In that role he has led the nation's bishops in warning against the use of "quasi-magical" practices in liturgies, notably healing services associated with charismatic devotions.

== See also ==
- Catholic Church in Vietnam
