= Archdiocese of Hanoi =

Archdiocese of the Catholic Church in Vietnam

Coordinates: 21.0333°N 105.8500°E

Metropolitan Archdiocese of Hanoi Archidioecesis Metropolitae Hanoiensis Tổng giáo phận đô thành Hà Nội

Catholic
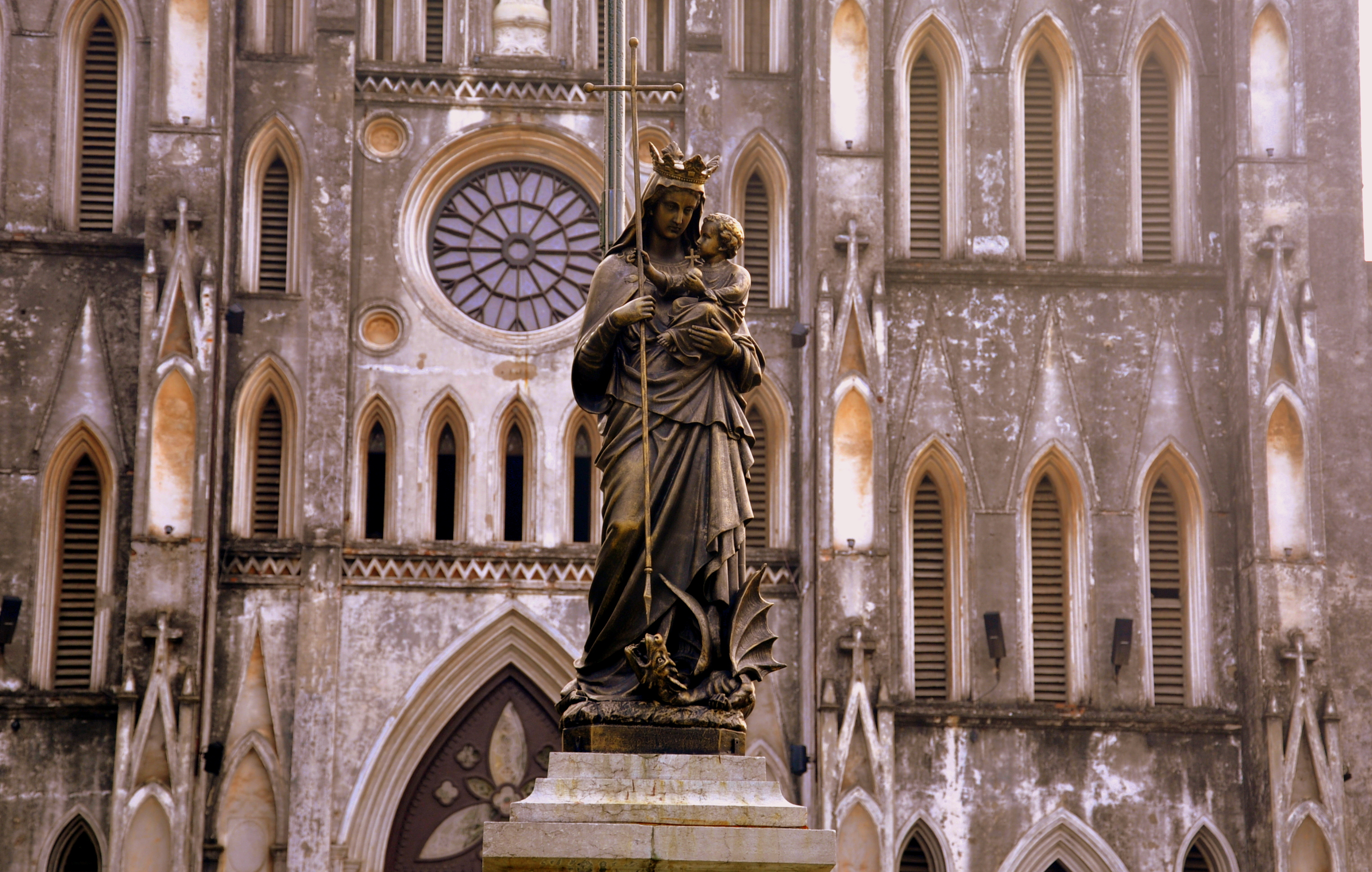
- Regina Pacis in front of St. Joseph's Cathedral

- Coat of arms

Location
- Country: Vietnam
- Ecclesiastical province: Hà Nội

Statistics
- Area: 6,000 km^{2} (2,300 sq mi)
- Population: Total; Catholics: (as of 2021); 8,885,360; 333,200 (3.7%)
- Parishes: 189

Information
- Denomination: Catholic
- Sui iuris church: Latin Church
- Rite: Roman Rite
- Established: 9 September 1659; 364 years ago as Apostolic Vicariate; 24 November 1960; 63 years ago as Metropolitan Archdiocese
- Cathedral: Saint Joseph Cathedral
- Patron saint: Saint Joseph
- Secular priests: 194

Current leadership
- Pope: Leo XIV
- Metropolitan Archbishop: Joseph Vũ Văn Thiên
- Auxiliary Bishops: Joseph Vũ Công Viện
- Bishops emeritus: Pierre Nguyễn Văn Nhơn; Joseph Ngô Quang Kiệt

Website
- Official website

The Metropolitan Archdiocese of Hanoi (Latin: Archidioecesis Metropolitae Hanoiensis, Vietnamese: Tổng giáo phận đô thành Hà Nội, French: Archidiocèse Metropolitain d'Hanoï) is a Catholic metropolitan archdiocese of Vietnam. It is one of the earliest in the history of the Catholic Church in Vietnam.

The creation of the diocese in its present form was declared on 24 November 1960. It covers an area of 7,000 km^{2} and has been led by Archbishop Joseph Vũ Văn Thiên since November 2018.

== Suffragans ==
The suffragan dioceses are:

- Diocese of Bắc Ninh
- Diocese of Bùi Chu
- Diocese of Hải Phòng
- Diocese of Thái Bình
- Diocese of Lạng Sơn & Cao Bằng
- Diocese of Hưng Hóa
- Diocese of Phát Diệm
- Diocese of Thanh Hóa
- Diocese of Vinh
- Diocese of Hà Tĩnh

== Cathedral ==
Saint Joseph Cathedral in Hanoi has been assigned as the cathedral of the archdiocese. The cathedral was built in 1886 in neo-Gothic style. It holds several masses throughout the day and is usually crowded on weekends and religious holidays. Christmas holiday in 2004 attracted more than 4,000 visitors to the cathedral.

== Current state ==
By 2004, the Archdiocese of Hanoi had about 282,886 believers (5.3% of the population), 59 priests and 132 parishes.

The Archdiocese of Hanoi is a "sister" diocese of the Diocese of Orange County (USA) since 2008.

The young Catholics from the Archdiocese of Hanoi and Archdiocese of Ho Chi Minh City formed in 2006 an organization for helping children in rural and underdeveloped areas of Vietnam.

Among the three major churches of Hanoi are Saint Joseph Cathedral, Cua Bac Church and Hàm Long Church.

In November 2006, the Cua Bac Catholic Church in Hanoi became the venue of joint worship service of the Vietnamese Catholics and Protestants with the participation of the United States president George W. Bush, who was on an official visit to Vietnam. Cua Bac Church (Northern Gate Church) has regular sermons and services in the English language and is often visited by expats and tourists.

In December 2007, thousands of Vietnamese Catholics marched in procession to the former apostolic nunciature in Hanoi (confiscated by the communist government in 1959) and prayed there twice aiming to return the property to the local Church. Despite their initial promise to return the nunciature building to the Catholic community, the authorities changed their position in September 2008 and decided to convert the building into a library and create a public park around it. The protests of the Catholic community were not taken into account.

It is purported that Archbishop Emeritus Ngo Quang Kiet was pressured to retire by government officials. Archbishop Kiet denied this, saying his retirement was due to stress and insomnia. His retirement was accepted by Pope Benedict XVI on 10 May 2010 and he was succeeded by Coadjutor Archbishop Nguyên Van Nhon.

On 17 November 2018, 58-year-old Joseph Vũ Văn Thiên, Bishop of Hải Phòng, was appointed Archbishop of Hanoi by Pope Francis. Pope Francis accepted Cardinal Nguyễn Văn Nhơn's resignation on 17 November 2018.

== Ordinaries ==
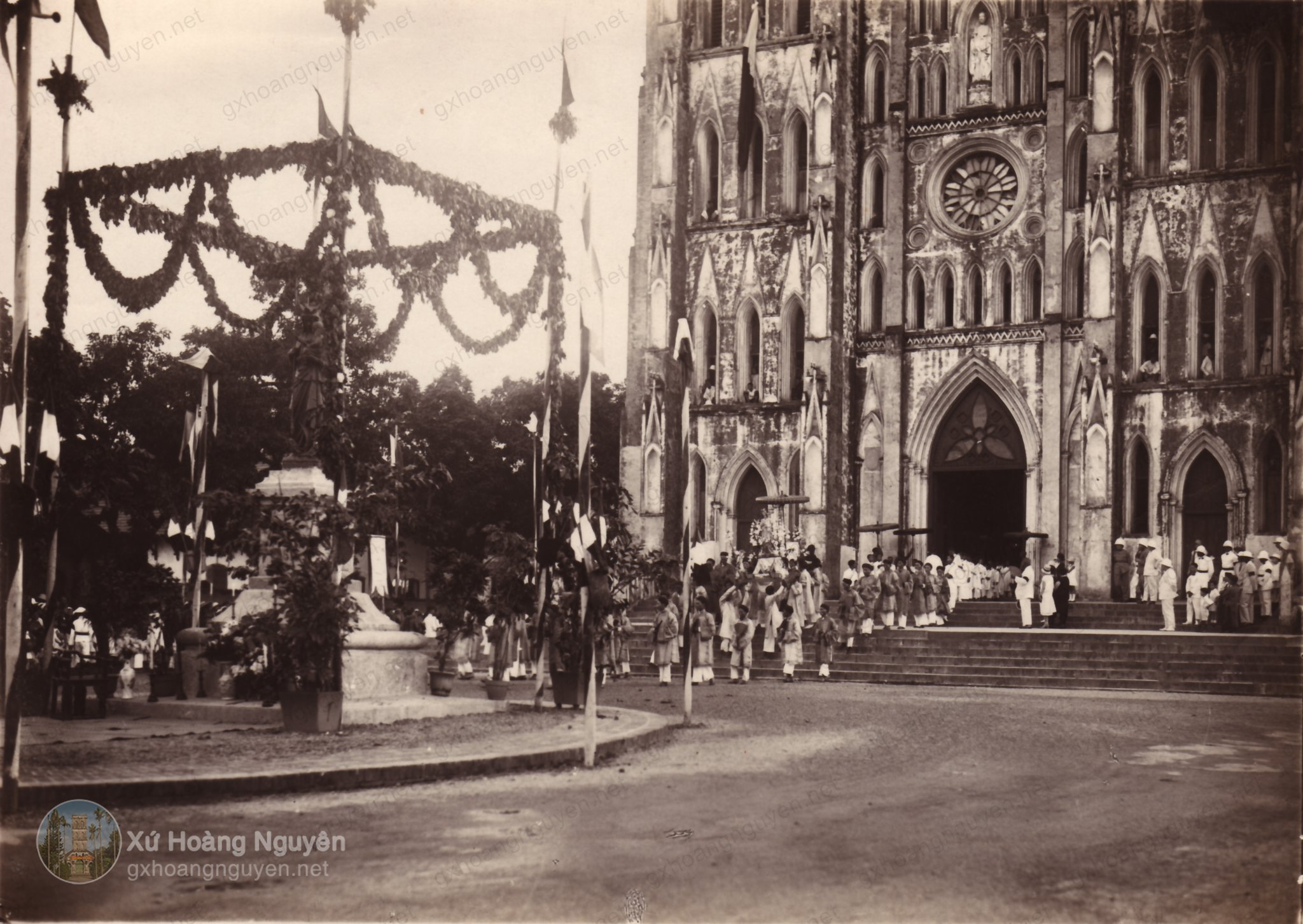
Procession by the cathedral

=== Vicars Apostolic of Western Tonking (1659-1924) ===
| Vicar apostolic | | Period in office | Status | Reference |
|---|---|---|---|---|
| 1 | Bishop François Pallu, M.E.P. | September 09, 1659 – 1679 | Transferred to Fujian | |
| 2 | Bishop Jacques de Bourges, M.E.P. | November 25, 1679 – August 09, 1714 | Died in office | |
| 3 | Bishop Edme Bélot, M.E.P. | August 09, 1714 – January 02, 1717 | Died in office | |
| 4 | Bishop François-Gabriel Guisain, M.E.P. | October 03, 1718 – November 17, 1723 | Died in office | |
| 5 | Bishop Louis Néez, M.E.P. | October 08, 1738 – October 19, 1764 | Died in office | |
| 6 | Bishop Bertrand Reydellet, M.E.P. | October 19, 1764 – July 27, 1780 | Died in office | |
| 7 | Bishop Jean Davoust, M.E.P. | July 18, 1780 – August 17, 1789 | Died in office | |
| 8 | Bishop Jacques-Benjamin Longer, M.E.P. | August 17, 1789 – February 08, 1831 | Died in office | |
| 9 | Bishop Joseph-Marie-Pélagie Havard, M.E.P. | February 08, 1831 – July 05, 1838 | Died in office | |
| – | Bishop-elect Pierre-Rose-Ursule Dumoulin-Borie, M.E.P. | July 05, 1838 – November 24, 1838 | Did not succeed, martyred. | |
| 10 | Bishop Pierre-André Retord, M.E.P. | November 24, 1838 – October 22, 1858 | Died in office | |
| 11 | Bishop Charles-Hubert Jeantet, M.E.P. | October 22, 1858 – July 24, 1866 | Died in office | |
| 12 | Bishop Joseph-Simon Theurel, M.E.P. | July 24, 1866 – November 03, 1868 | Died in office | |
| 13 | Bishop Paul-François Puginier, M.E.P. | November 03, 1868 – April 25, 1892 | Died in office | |
| 14 | Bishop Pierre-Jean-Marie Gendreau, M.E.P. | April 25, 1892 – December 03, 1924 | Remained as Vicar Apostolic of Hà Nôi | |

=== Vicars Apostolic of Hà Nôi (1924-1960) ===
| Vicar apostolic | | Period in office | Status | Reference |
|---|---|---|---|---|
| 14 | Bishop Pierre-Jean-Marie Gendreau, M.E.P. | December 03, 1924 – February 07, 1935 | Died in office | |
| 15 | Bishop François Chaize, M.E.P. | February 07, 1935 – February 22, 1949 | Died in office | |
| 16 | Bishop Joseph-Marie Trịnh Như Khuê | April 18, 1950 – November 24, 1960 | Remained as Archbishop of Hà Nôi | |

=== Archbishops of Hanoi (1960-present) ===
| Bishop | | Coat of Arms | Period in office | Status | Reference |
|---|---|---|---|---|---|
| 1 | Cardinal Joseph-Marie Trịnh Như Khuê | | November 24, 1960 – November 27, 1978 | Died in office | |
| 2 | Cardinal Joseph-Marie Trịnh Văn Căn | | November 27, 1978 – May 18, 1990 | Died in office | |
| – | Bishop Paul-Joseph Phạm Ðình Tụng | | May 18, 1990 – March 23, 1994 | Apostolic Administrator | |
| 3 | Cardinal Paul-Joseph Phạm Ðình Tụng | | March 23, 1994 – February 19, 2005 | Resigned | |
| – | Bishop Joseph Ngô Quang Kiệt | | April 15, 2003 – February 19, 2005 | Apostolic Administrator sede plena | |
| 4 | Archbishop Joseph Ngô Quang Kiệt | | February 19, 2005 – May 13, 2010 | Resigned | |
| 5 | Cardinal Pierre Nguyễn Văn Nhơn | | May 13, 2010 – November 17, 2018 | Resigned | |
| 6 | Bishop Joseph Vũ Văn Thiên | | November 17, 2018 – present | Current archbishop | |

Coadjutor Vicar Apostolic of Western Tonking (1696-1923)

| Coadjutor Vicar Apostolic | | Period in office | Reference |
|---|---|---|---|
| 1 | Bishop Edme Bélot, M.E.P. | October 20, 1696 – August 09, 1714 | |
| 2 | Bishop Louis-Marie Deveaux, M.E.P. | February 15, 1745 – January 01, 1756 | |
| 3 | Bishop Edmond Bennetat, M.E.P. | July 16, 1758 – May 22, 1761 | |
| – | Bishop-elect Bertrand Reydellet, M.E.P. | July 27, 1762 – October 19, 1764 | |
| 4 | Bishop Jean Davoust, M.E.P. | September 24, 1771 – July 18, 1780 | |
| – | Bishop-elect Jacques-Benjamin Longer, M.E.P. | April 03, 1787 – August 17, 1789 | |
| 5 | Bishop Charles Lamothe, M.E.P. | February 05, 1793 – May 22, 1816 | |
| 6 | Bishop Jean-Jacques Guérard, M.E.P. | May 23, 1816 – June 18, 1823 | |
| 7 | Bishop Jean-François Ollivier, M.E.P. | April 06, 1824 – May 27, 1827 | |
| 8 | Bishop Joseph-Marie-Pélagie Havard, M.E.P. | March 21, 1828 – February 08, 1831 | |
| – | Fr. Pierre-Rose-Ursule Dumoulin-Borie, M.E.P. | July 31, 1832 – July 05, 1838 | |
| 9 | Bishop Jean-Denis Gauthier, M.E.P. | November 10, 1839 – March 27, 1846 | |
| 10 | Bishop Charles-Hubert Jeantet, M.E.P. | March 27, 1846 – October 22, 1858 | |
| 11 | Bishop Joseph-Simon Theurel, M.E.P. | 1859 – July 24, 1866 | |
| 12 | Bishop Paul-François Puginier, M.E.P. | June 07, 1866 – November 03, 1868 | |
| 13 | Bishop Pierre-Jean-Marie Gendreau, M.E.P. | April 26, 1887 – April 25, 1892 | |
| 14 | Bishop Jean-Pierre-Alexandre Marcou, M.E.P. | April 18, 1895 – April 16, 1901 | |
| 15 | Bishop Louis-Marie-Henri-Joseph Bigolet, M.E.P. | June 27, 1911 – May 23, 1923 | |

Coadjutor Vicar Apostolic of Hanoi (1925-1935)

| Coadjutor Vicar Apostolic | | Period in office | Reference |
|---|---|---|---|
| 16 | Bishop François Chaize, M.E.P. | May 12, 1925 – February 07, 1935 | |

Coadjutor Archbishops of Hanoi (1963-2010)

| Coadjutor Archbishop | | Coat of Arms | Period in office | Reference |
|---|---|---|---|---|
| 1 | Archbishop Joseph-Marie Trịnh Văn Căn | | February 05, 1963 – November 27, 1978 | |
| 2 | Archbishop Pierre Nguyễn Văn Nhơn | | April 22, 2010 – May 13, 2010 | |

Auxiliary Bishops of Hanoi (1981-present)

| Auxiliary Bishop | | Coat of Arms | Period in office | Reference |
|---|---|---|---|---|
| 1 | Bishop François Xavier Nguyễn Văn Sang | | March 24, 1981 – December 03, 1990 | |
| 2 | Bishop Paul Lê Ðắc Trọng | | March 23, 1994 – January 21, 2006 | |
| 3 | Bishop Laurent Chu Văn Minh | | October 15, 2008 – January 26, 2019 | |
| 4 | Bishop Joseph Vũ Công Viện | | October 26, 2024 – present | |

=== Other secular clergy who became bishops ===
- Paul Joseph Phạm Đình Tụng, appointed Bishop of Bắc Ninh in 1963 and later appointed Apostolic Administrator and Archbishop here
- Pierre Nguyễn Huy Mai (priest here, 1941-1954), appointed Bishop of Ban Mê Thuột in 1967
- Dominique Nguyễn Văn Lãng (priest here, 1951-1954), appointed Bishop of Xuân Lộc in 1974
- Joseph Marie Nguyễn Tùng Cương, appointed Bishop of Hải Phòng in 1979
- Joseph Trịnh Chính Trực (priest here until 1954), appointed Coadjutor Bishop of Ban Mê Thuột in 1981 and later succeeded
- Joseph Nguyễn Văn Yến, appointed Coadjutor Bishop of Phát Diệm in 1988 and later succeeded
- Joseph Ðặng Ðức Ngân, appointed Bishop of Lạng Sơn and Cao Bằng in 2007, later Bishop of Ðà Nẵng and Coadjutor Archbishop of Huế
