= Paul Tịnh Nguyễn Bình Tĩnh =

Vietnamese Roman Catholic bishop (1930–2023)

His Excellency Paul Tịnh Nguyễn Bình Tĩnh P.S.S.
- Bishop of Đà Nẵng
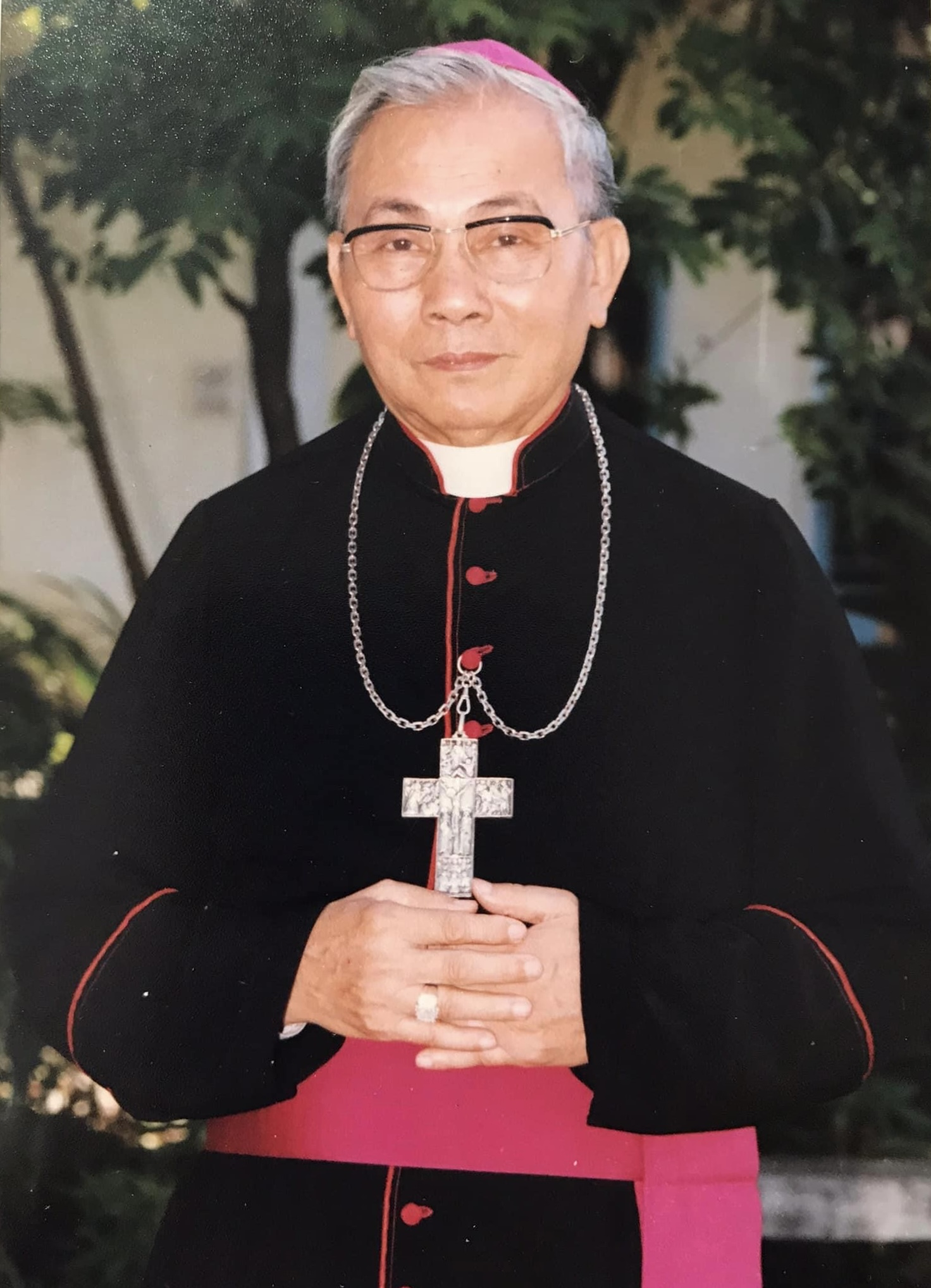
- Native name: Phaolô Tịnh Nguyễn Bình Tĩnh
- Province: Huế
- See: Đà Nẵng
- Appointed: 6 November 2000
- Term ended: 13 May 2006
- Predecessor: François Xavier Nguyên Quang Sách
- Successor: Joseph Châu Ngọc Tri

Orders
- Ordination: 31 May 1960 by Simon Hòa Nguyễn Văn Hiền
- Consecration: 30 June 2000 by François Xavier Nguyên Quang Sách

Personal details
- Born: 30 June 1930 Phát Diệm, Tonkin, French Indochina
- Died: 21 November 2023 (aged 93) Đà Nẵng, Việt Nam
- Motto: Humiliter servire (Humbly serve)

Paul Tịnh Nguyễn Bình Tĩnh (30 June 1930 − 21 November 2023) was a Vietnamese Roman Catholic bishop.

Ordained to the priesthood in 1960, Nguyễn Bình Tĩnh was named coadjutor bishop of the Roman Catholic Diocese of Đà Nẵng, Vietnam and ordained to the episcopate on 30 June 2000. He succeeded on 6 November 2000 and retired on 13 May 2006. He died on 21 November 2023, at the age of 93.

Catholic Church titles
Preceded by François Xavier Nguyên Quang Sách	Bishop of Đà Nẵng; 2000–2006	Succeeded by Joseph Châu Ngọc Tri
