= Joseph-Marie-Pélagie Havard =

19th-century Catholic bishop

Joseph-Marie-Pélagie Havard MEP
- Vicar Apostolic of Western Tonking
- Church: Catholic Church
- See: Apostolic Vicariate of Western Tonking
- In office: 8 February 1831 – 5 July 1838
- Predecessor: Jacques-Benjamin Longer
- Successor: Pierre-André Retord
- Other post: Titular Bishop of Castoria (1828-1838)
- Previous post: Coadjutor Vicar Apostolic of Western Tonking (1828-1831)

Orders
- Ordination: 16 June 1821
- Consecration: 21 September 1829 by Jacques-Benjamin Longer

Personal details
- Born: 2 November 1790 Thourie, Ille-et-Vilaine, Kingdom of France
- Died: 5 July 1838 (aged 47) Hanoi, Đại Việt, Great Qing

Joseph-Marie-Pélagie Havard (2 November 1790 – 5 July 1838) was a 19th-century Catholic bishop who worked as a missionary in Vietnam.

== Life ==
Havard was born in 1790 in Thourie, in the ancient province of Brittany, during the final days of the Kingdom of France. Nothing is recorded of his upbringing or how he fared during the turmoil of the French Revolution and the First French Empire.

Some time about 1815, Havard entered the seminary of the Paris Foreign Missions Society to give his service to the Church in Asia. After completing his studies there, he was sent to Vietnam, where he received Holy Orders on 16 June 1821 from Bishop Jacques-Benjamin Longer, M.E.P., who had served as the Apostolic Vicar of the Vicariate Apostolic of Western Tonkin since 1787.

Havard was appointed Longer's coadjutor bishop by the Holy See in March 1828, for which office he was named the titular bishop of Castoria. He automatically succeeded to the office upon Longer's death on 8 February 1831.

Havard oversaw the Catholic Church in Vietnam during a time of major persecution under the Emperor Minh Mang. He had expected to be succeeded as Vicar Apostolic by Pierre Dumoulin-Borie, M.E.P., who was appointed as his coadjutor in 1836. But Dumoulin-Borie was arrested in 1838, before the news had reached the missions, which destroyed this plan. When the news did reach Hanoi, he was immediately put to death by order of the emperor .

Havard died in Hanoi in 1838, being succeeded by Pierre-André Retord, M.E.P.
