= Jacques-Benjamin Longer =

The Right Reverend Jacques-Benjamin Longer
- See: Apostolic Vicariate of Tonking
- In office: 17 August 1789 – 8 February 1831
- Other post: Titular Bishop of Gortyna (1787–1831)

Personal details
- Born: 31 May 1752 Le Havre, Kingdom of France
- Died: 8 February 1831 (aged 78)
- Denomination: Catholic Church

Jacques-Benjamin Longer (31 May 1752 – 8 February 1831) was a French Catholic bishop who became the Vicar Apostolic of Western Tonking (corresponding today to the Archdiocese of Hanoi).

== Life ==
Jacques-Benjamin Longer was born on 31 May 1752 in Le Havre, in the Kingdom of France. He became a member of the Paris Foreign Missions Society, and was ordained a priest on 23 September 1775. He then went to Tonking as a missionary, where he was made the Coadjutor Vicar Apostolic of Western Tonking on 3 April 1787. At the same time, he was appointed the Titular Bishop of Gortyna, succeeding Pierre-Jean Kerhervé. Longer then became the Vicar Apostolic on 17 August 1789, upon the death of Jean Davoust. He was finally ordained a bishop on 30 September 1792 by Marcelino José Da Silva, the Bishop of Macau. Longer died on 8 February 1831. He was succeeded by Joseph-Marie-Pélagie Havard as Vicar Apostolic of Western Tonking and by Leonard Neale as Titular Bishop of Gortyna.

Catholic Church titles
Preceded by Pierre-Jean Kerhervé	— TITULAR — Titular Bishop of Gortyna; 1787–1831	Succeeded by Leonard Neale
Preceded by Jean Davoust	Vicar Apostolic of Western Tonking; 1789–1831	Succeeded by Joseph-Marie-Pélagie Havard
