= Diocese of Đà Nẵng =

Roman Catholic diocese in Vietnam

Coordinates: 16.0667°N 108.2233°E

Diocese of Đà Nẵng Dioecesis Danangensis Giáo phận Đà Nẵng

Catholic
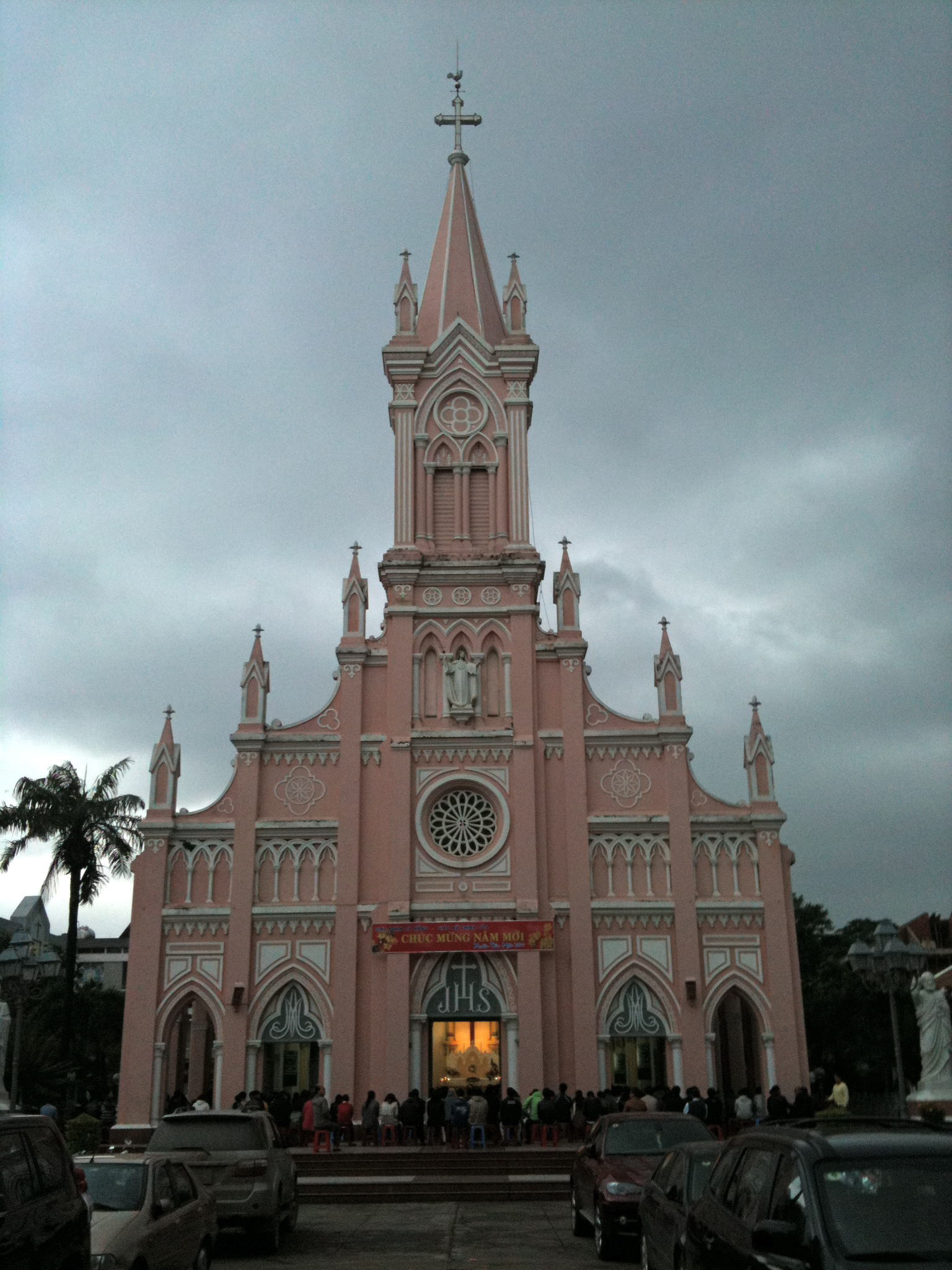
- Đà Nẵng Cathedral

Location
- Country: Vietnam
- Ecclesiastical province: Huế

Statistics
- Area: 11,723 km^{2} (4,526 sq mi)
- Population: Total; Catholics: (as of 2022); 2,763,900; 73,742 (2.7%)

Information
- Rite: Latin
- Cathedral: Sacred Heart Cathedral in Da Nang
- Patron saint: Sacred Heart

Current leadership
- Pope: Leo XIV
- Bishop: Sede vacante
- Metropolitan Archbishop: Joseph Ðặng Ðức Ngân
- Apostolic Administrator: Joseph Ðặng Ðức Ngân

Website
- Website of the Diocese

The Diocese of Đà Nẵng (Latin: Dioecesis Đànẵngensis) is a Roman Catholic diocese in central Vietnam. The bishop is Joseph Đặng Đức Ngân since 2016. The creation of the diocese in present form was declared January 18, 1963. The diocese covers an area of 11,690 km², and is a suffragan diocese of the Archdiocese of Huế. By 2004, the diocese of Đà Nang had about 57,870 believers (2.7% of the population), 68 priests and 38 parishes. Sacred Heart Cathedral in Da Nang has been assigned as the Cathedral of the diocese.

== Bishops ==
=== Bishops of Đà Nẵng (1963–present) ===
Bishop		Coat of Arms	Period in office	Status	Reference
1	Pierre-Marie Phạm Ngọc Chi		January 18, 1963 – January 21, 1988	Died in office	
2	François Xavier Nguyễn Quang Sách		January 21, 1988 – November 6, 2000	Resigned	
3	Paul Tịnh Nguyễn Bình Tĩnh, P.S.S.		November 6, 2000 – May 13, 2006	Resigned	
4	Joseph Châu Ngọc Tri		May 13, 2006 – March 12, 2016	Appointed Bishop of Lạng Sơn and Cao Bằng.	
5	Joseph Ðặng Ðức Ngân		March 12, 2016 – September 21, 2023	Appointed Coadjutor Archbisbhop of Huế	
–	Archbishop Joseph Ðặng Ðức Ngân		September 21, 2023 – present	Apostolic Administrator	

Coadjutor Bishops of Đà Nẵng (1975–2000)

Coadjutor Bishop		Period in office	Reference
1	Bishop François Xavier Nguyễn Quang Sách	June 6, 1975 – January 21, 1988	
2	Bishop Paul Nguyễn Bình Tĩnh, P.S.S.	May 10, 2000 – November 6, 2000	

=== Other secular clergy who became bishops ===
- Joseph Lê Văn Ấn (incardinated here in 1963), appointed Bishop of Xuân Lộc in 1965
- Dominic Mai Thanh Lương (priest here, 1966–1976), appointed Auxiliary Bishop of Orange and Titular Bishop of Cebarades in 2003
- Alphonse Nguyễn Hữu Long PSS (priest here, 1990–2003), appointed Auxiliary Bishop of Hưng Hóa and Titular Bishop of Gummi in Bizacena in 2013 and later Bishop of Vinh
