= Paul Nguyễn Văn Hòa =

Vietnamese Roman Catholic bishop

His Excellency, The Most Reverend Paul Nguyễn Văn Hòa
- Bishop of Nha Trang
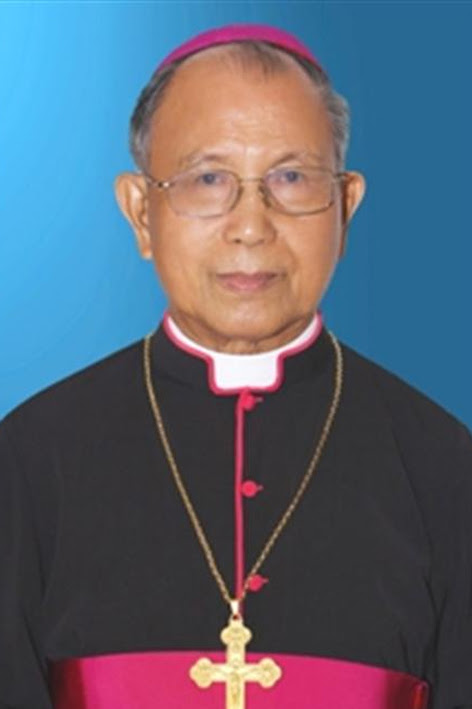
- Native name: Phaolô Nguyễn Văn Hòa
- Province: Huế
- See: Nha Trang
- Appointed: 25 April 1975
- Installed: 25 May 1975
- Term ended: 4 December 2009
- Predecessor: François-Xavier Nguyễn Văn Thuận
- Successor: Joseph Võ Đức Minh
- Other post: President of the Catholic Bishops' Conference of Việt Nam (2001-2007)
- Previous posts: Apostolic Administrator of Ban Mê Thuột (2006-2009); Bishop of Phan Thiết (1975)

Orders
- Ordination: 20 December 1959 by Gregorio Pietro Agagianian
- Consecration: 5 April 1975 by Pierre Nguyễn Huy Mai

Personal details
- Born: 20 July 1931 Bình Lục, Hà Nam, French Indochina
- Died: 14 February 2017 (aged 85) Nha Trang, Việt Nam
- Buried: Marian Shrine of the Nha Trang Cathedral
- Denomination: Catholic Church
- Education: Pontifical Urban College de Propaganda Fide; Pontifical Urban University; Pontifical Institute of Sacred Music
- Motto: In spiritu et veritate (In spirit and truth) (Trong tinh thần và chân lý)
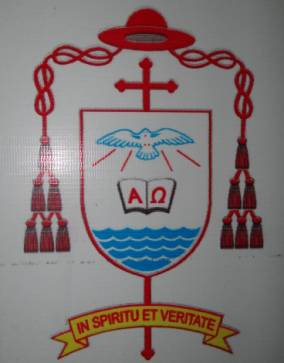
- Coat of arms: Paul Nguyễn Văn Hòa's coat of arms

Styles of Paul Nguyễn Văn Hòa
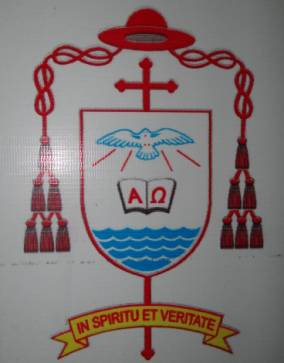
- Reference style: His Excellency; The Most Reverend
- Spoken style: Your Excellency
- Religious style: Bishop

Ordination history of Paul Nguyễn Văn Hòa
History
Priestly ordination
- Ordained by: Gregorio Pietro Agagianian
Episcopal consecration
- Principal consecrator: Pierre Nguyễn Huy Mai
- Co-consecrators: Father Joseph Trịnh Chính Trực
Episcopal succession
Bishops consecrated by Paul Nguyễn Văn Hòa as principal consecrator
- Pierre Nguyễn Văn Nho: 18 June 1997
- Antoine Vũ Huy Chương: 1 October 2003
- Joseph Nguyễn Chí Linh: 4 August 2004
- Joseph Võ Ðức Minh: 15 December 2005

Paul Nguyễn Văn Hòa (20 July 1931 – 14 February 2017) was a Vietnamese Roman Catholic bishop.

Ordained to the priesthood in 1959, Nguyễn Văn Hòa served as of the Roman Catholic Diocese of Nha Trang from 1975 to 2009.

He was the composer of Vietnamese-language Mass "Seraphim", which is written in 1960.

== See also ==
- Catholic Church in Vietnam
