= Joseph Ngô Quang Kiệt =

Vietnamese Catholic prelate (born 1952)

His Excellency, The Most Reverend Joseph Ngô Quang Kiêt
- Archbishop Emeritus of Hà Nội
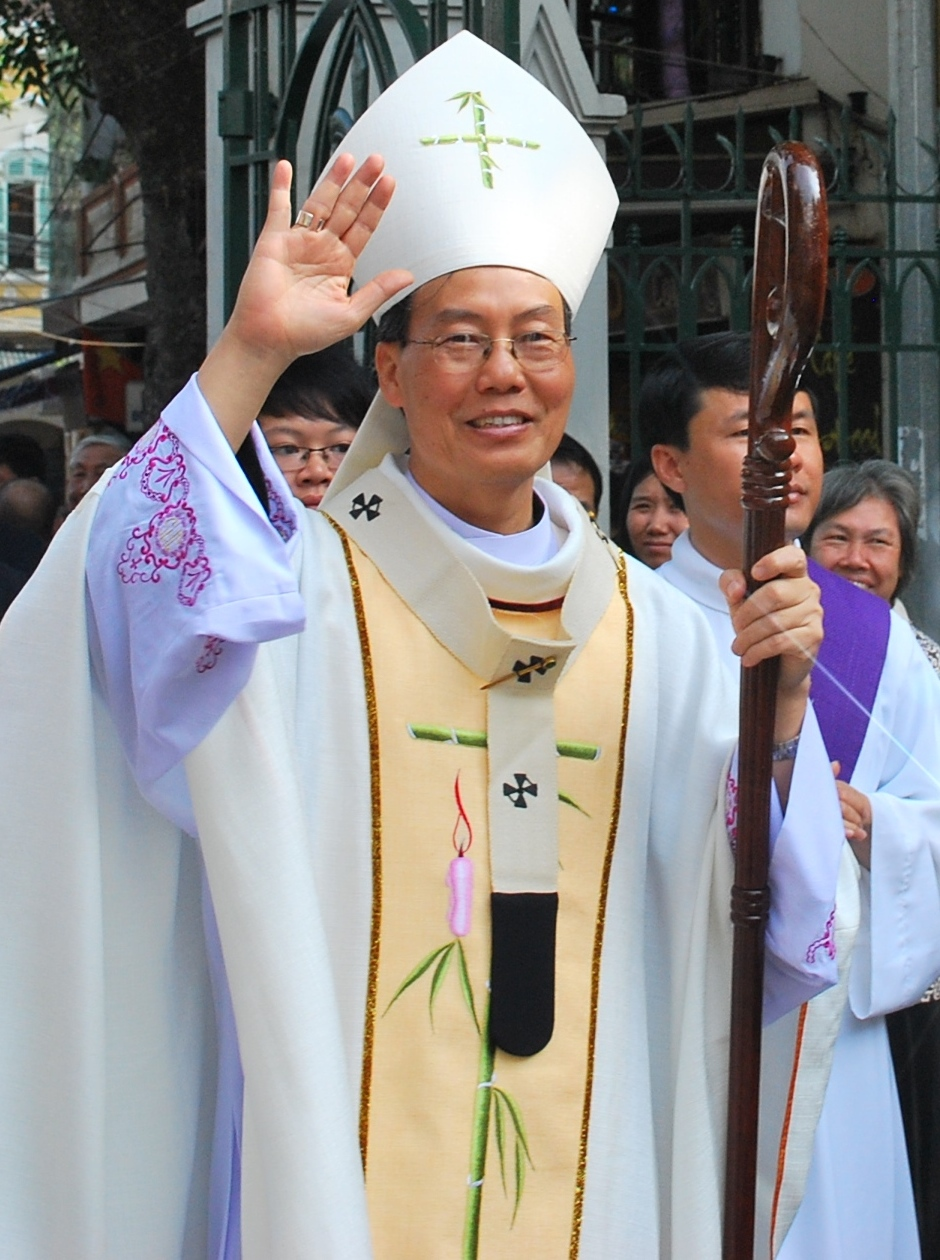
- Kiệt in 2009
- Native name: Giuse Ngô Quang Kiệt
- Church: Catholic
- Province: Hà Nội
- See: Hà Nội
- Appointed: 19 February 2005
- Installed: 19 March 2005
- Term ended: 13 May 2010
- Predecessor: Paul Joseph Phạm Đình Tụng
- Successor: Peter Nguyễn Văn Nhơn
- Previous posts: Apostolic Administrator of Bắc Ninh (2006–2008); Apostolic Administrator of Lạng Sơn and Cao Bằng (2005–2007); Apostolic Administrator of Thanh Hóa (2003–2004); Apostolic Administrator of Hà Nôi (2003–2005); Bishop of Lạng Sơn and Cao Bằng (1999–2005)

Orders
- Ordination: 31 May 1991 by Jean Baptiste Bùi Tuần
- Consecration: 29 June 1999 by Jean Baptiste Bùi Tuần
- Rank: Archbishop

Personal details
- Born: 4 September 1952 (age 74) Lạng Sơn, French Indochina
- Residence: Châu Sơn Cistercian Monastery, Ninh Bình
- Education: Institut Catholique de Paris
- Motto: Misereor super turbam; (Compassion on the crowd); (Chạnh lòng thương)
- Styles
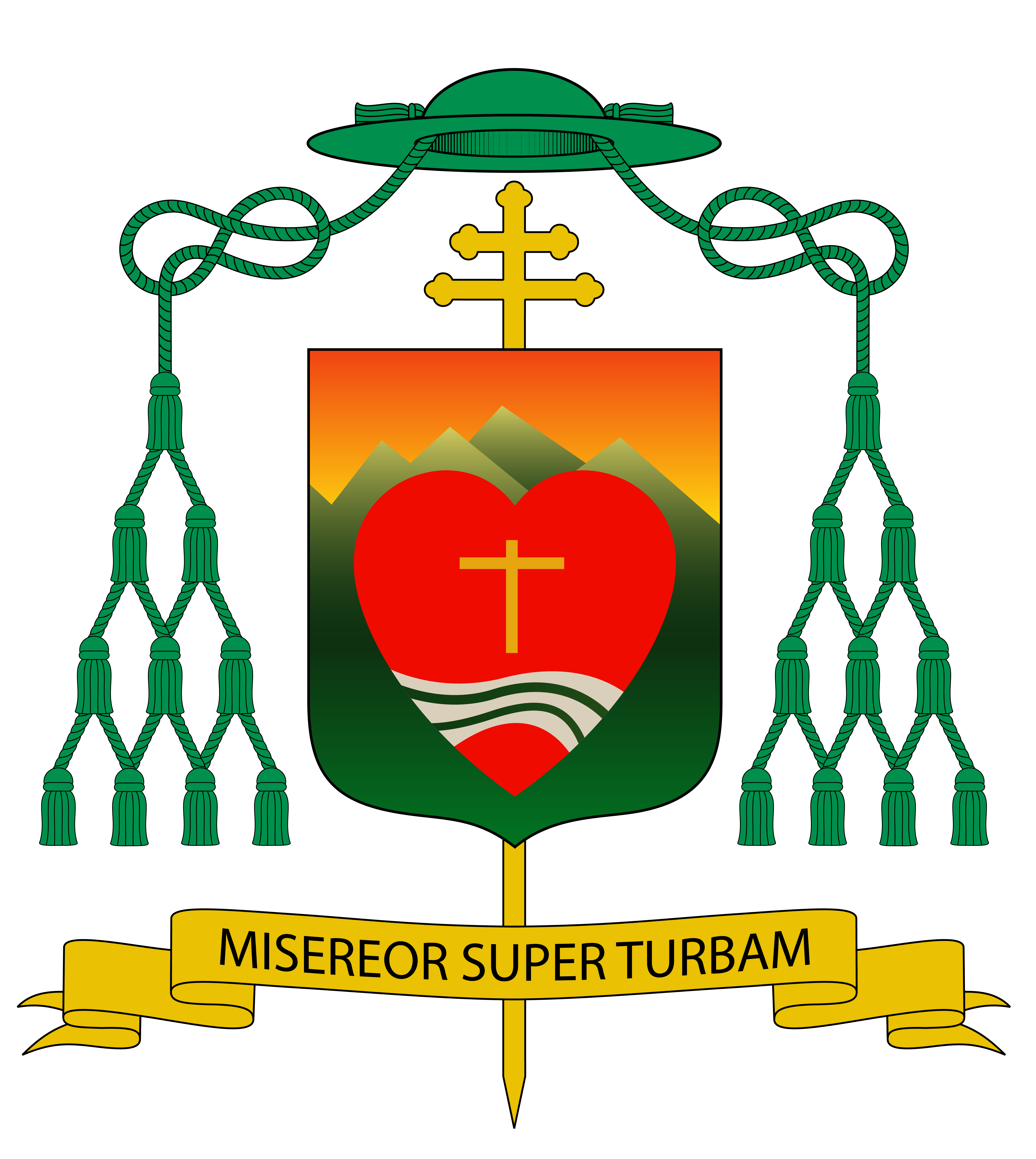
- Reference style: His Excellency; The Most Reverend
- Spoken style: Your Excellency
- Religious style: Archbishop

Joseph Ngô Quang Kiệt (born 4 September 1952) is a Vietnamese Catholic prelate who served as the fourth Archbishop of Hanoi from 2005 to 2010. In 1993, he studied at the Institut Catholique de Paris, France. Before becoming archbishop, he served as the second Bishop of Lạng Sơn and Cao Bằng from 1999 to 2005.

== Resignation ==
On 22 April 2010, 72-year-old Pierre Nguyễn Văn Nhơn, Bishop of Đà Lạt, was appointed Coadjutor Archbishop of Hà Nội by Pope Benedict XVI. There was well-documented evidence of tension between the Church and the government over the old apostolic delegation (Note: This is colloquially called the "papal nunciature" by many sources.) building dispute in 2008. The prime minister had promised to return the building, but after some protests in his Archdiocese at Thái Hà church and the delegate building, which ended in violence due to "pro-government gangs" intervening, the building was ultimately not returned and the government pinned Kiệt as the culprit for the incident. It was revealed that in a meeting with several unnamed foreign diplomats that the mayor of Hà Nội had asked for Kiệt to be removed as archbishop. However, Kiệt denied these rumors publicly and that there was "no pressure from any side" but he reportedly admitted to suffering from stress and insomnia. Pope Benedict XVI accepted his resignation on 13 May 2010, at age 57, and Nhơn succeeded as Archbishop of Hà Nội.
