= Paul Joseph Phạm Đình Tụng =

Vietnamese Catholic cardinal (1919-2009)

His Eminence Paul Joseph Phạm Đình Tụng
- Cardinal, Archbishop of Hà Nội
- Native name: Phaolô Giuse Phạm Đình Tụng
- Church: Catholic
- Province: Hà Nội
- See: Hà Nội
- Appointed: 23 March 1994
- Installed: 14 August 1994
- Term ended: 19 February 2005
- Predecessor: Joseph-Marie Trịnh Văn Căn
- Successor: Joseph Ngô Quang Kiệt
- Other post: Cardinal-Priest of Santa Maria "Regina Pacis" in Ostia mare (1994-2009)
- Previous posts: Apostolic Administrator of Lạng Sơn and Cao Bằng (1998-1999); Apostolic Administrator sede plena of Lạng Sơn and Cao Bằng (1998); Apostolic Administrator of Hưng Hóa (1994-2003); Apostolic Administrator of Hà Nội (1990-1994); Bishop of Bắc Ninh (1963-1994)

Orders
- Ordination: 6 June 1949 by Thaddeus Lê Hữu Từ O.Cist
- Consecration: 15 August 1963 by Joseph-Marie Trịnh Như Khuê
- Created cardinal: 26 November 1994 by John Paul II
- Rank: Cardinal-Priest

Personal details
- Born: 15 June 1919 Hòa Bình, Cochinchina, Indochinese Union
- Died: 22 February 2009 (aged 89) Hanoi, Vietnam
- Motto: Credidimus caritati; (We believe in the love of God); (Chúng tôi tin vào tình yêu Thiên Chúa)
- Styles
- Reference style: His Eminence
- Spoken style: Your Eminence
- Informal style: Cardinal
- See: Hanoi

Paul Joseph Phạm Đình Tụng (15 June 1919 – 22 February 2009) was a Vietnamese Catholic prelate who served as the third Archbishop of Hà Nội from 1994 to 2005. He previously served as the first Bishop of Bắc Ninh from 1960 to 1994. He was created a cardinal in 1994.

== Ecclesiastical career ==
He was ordained to the priesthood on 6 June 1949. He was pastor of Hàm Long Parish in Hanoi, North Vietnam, from 1950 to 1955. Afterwards, he served as Superior of St. John Minor Seminary in Hanoi, from 1955 to 1963. The seminary was permanently closed under orders of the state authority in 1960. He was created bishop of Bắc Ninh in 1963.

Since nearly the very beginning of his role as bishop there, he was under "virtual house arrest", and was unable to carry out his duties to the nearly 100 parishes under his jurisdiction. Therefore, in an effort to minister to the people of his diocese, Tụng compiled, in lục bát, a Vietnamese poetic form in stanzas of six to eight words, the life of Jesus and the Gospels. This also included the Catholic theology, the Ten Commandments, the Precepts of the Church, and the seven sacraments. During his last four years there, he was finally free to continue his ministry after almost 30 years of being barred from doing so.

Also during those four years, he served in the capacity as apostolic administrator of Hanoi. On 13 April 1994, Tụng was made archbishop there. He was created a Cardinal-Priest of Santa Maria Regina Pacis in Ostia Mare by John Paul II during the Consistory of 26 November 1994. He resigned the pastoral government of the archdiocese on 19 February 2005. He was succeeded by Joseph Ngô Quang Kiệt. He died on 22 February 2009 at the age of 89.
