= Diocese of Lạng Sơn and Cao Bằng =

Diocese of the Catholic Church in northern Vietnam

Coordinates: 21°50′N 106°45′E

Diocese of Lạng Sơn and Cao Bằng Dioecesis Langsonensis et Caobangensis Giáo phận Lạng Sơn Cao Bằng

Catholic
- Coat of arms of Bishop Tri

Location
- Country: Vietnam
- Ecclesiastical province: Hà Nội

Statistics
- Area: 18,359 km^{2} (7,088 sq mi)
- Population: Total; Catholics: (as of 2022); 1,850,000; 6,450 (0.3%)
- Parishes: 14

Information
- Denomination: Catholic
- Sui iuris church: Latin Church
- Rite: Roman Rite
- Established: 31 December 1913 (as Apostolic Prefecture); 11 July 1939 (elevated as Apostolic Vicariate); 24 November 1960 (elevated as Diocese)
- Cathedral: Cathedral of Saint Dominic (Cửa Nam)
- Patron saint: Saint Dominic
- Secular priests: 28

Current leadership
- Pope: Leo XIV
- Bishop: Joseph Châu Ngọc Tri
- Metropolitan Archbishop: Joseph Vũ Văn Thiên

Map
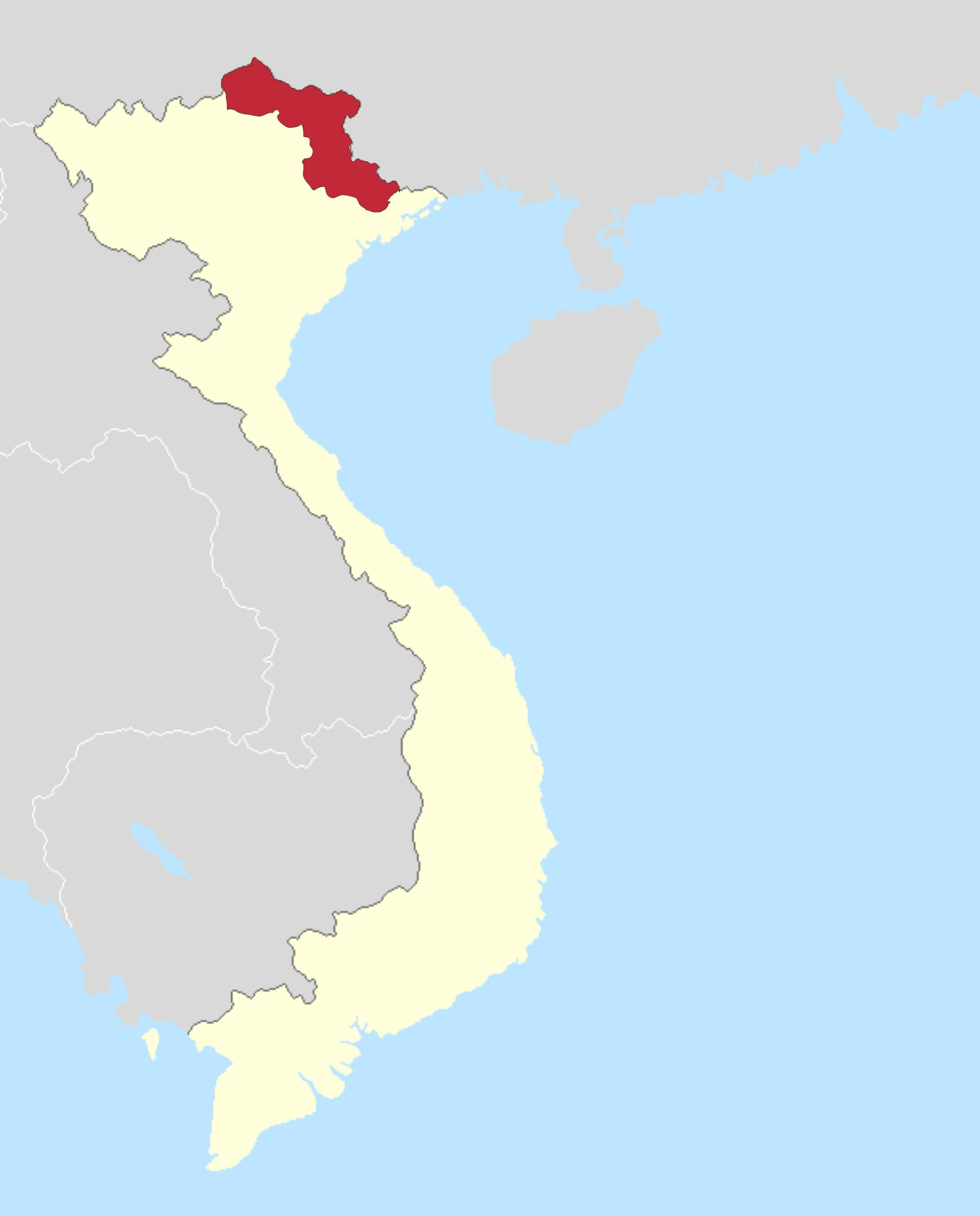

Website
- Website of the Diocese

The diocese of Lạng Sơn and Cao Bằng (Latin: Dioecesis Langsonensis et Caobangensis) is a Roman Catholic diocese in northern Vietnam's Lạng Sơn and Cao Bằng provinces.

Joseph Chau Ngoc Tri (vn) was appointed in 2016 as the diocese's bishop.

The creation of the diocese in its present form was declared on 24 November 1960. The diocese covers an area of 17,815 km^{2}, and is a suffragan diocese of the Archdiocese of Hanoi. By 2004, the diocese had 6,078 believers (0.5% of the population), 4 priests and 11 parishes. Saint Dominic Cathedral in Lạng Sơn has been assigned as the Cathedral of the diocese. In June 2007, fifty deacons were officially ordained in Lạng Sơn.

== Ordinaries ==
=== Prefects apostolics of Lạng Sơn and Cao Bằng (1913-1939) ===
Prefect apostolic		Period in office	Status	Reference
1	Fr. Bertrand Cothonay, O.P.	1913 – 1924	Resigned	
2	Fr. Marie-Dominique Maillet, O.P.	March 31, 1925 – 1930	Resigned	
–	Fr. Félix-Maurice Hedde, O.P.	June 01, 1929 – July 11, 1931	Apostolic administrator	
3	Fr. Félix-Maurice Hedde, O.P.	November 20, 1931 – July 11, 1939	Remained, and later he became bishop and vicar apostolic of Lạng Sơn and Cao Bằng	

=== Vicars apostolic of Lạng Sơn and Cao Bằng (1939-1960) ===
Prefect apostolic		Period in office	Status	Reference
1	Bishop Félix-Maurice Hedde, O.P.	July 11, 1939 – May 4, 1960	Died in office	
2	Bishop Réginald-André-Paulin-Edmond Jacq, O.P.	May 4, 1960 – November 24, 1960	Resigned	

=== Bishops of Lạng Sơn and Cao Bằng (1960-present) ===
Bishop		Coat of Arms	Period in office	Status	Reference
1	Bishop Vincent de Paul Phạm Văn Dụ		November 24, 1960 – September 2, 1998	Died in office	
–	Cardinal Paul-Joseph Phạm Ðình Tụng		March 01, 1998 – September 02, 1998	Apostolic Administrator sede plena	
–	Cardinal Paul-Joseph Phạm Ðình Tụng		September 02, 1998 – June 06, 1999	Apostolic Administrator	
2	Bishop Joseph Ngô Quang Kiệt		June 3, 1999 – February 19, 2005	Transferred to Hanoi.	
3	Bishop Joseph Ðặng Ðức Ngân		October 12, 2007 – March 12, 2016	Transferred to Đà Nang	
4	Bishop Joseph Châu Ngọc Tri		March 12, 2016 – present	Current bishop	

Coadjutor Vicar Apostolic of Lạng Sơn and Cao Bằng (1948-1960)

Coadjutor vicar apostolic		Period in office	Reference
1	Bishop Réginald-André-Paulin-Edmond Jacq, O.P.	July 8, 1948 – May 4, 1960	

Auxiliary Bishop of Lạng Sơn and Cao Bằng (1960)

Auxiliary Bishop		Period in office	Reference
–	Bishop-elect Vincent de Paul Phạm Văn Dụ	March 05, 1960 – November 24, 1960	
