= Joseph-Marie Trịnh Như Khuê =

Vietnamese Catholic cardinal (1898–1978)

His Eminence Joseph-Marie Trịnh Như Khuê
- Cardinal, Archbishop of Hà Nội
- Native name: Giuse Maria Trịnh Như Khuê
- Province: Hà Nội
- See: Hà Nội
- Appointed: 18 April 1950 (as Apostolic Vicar)
- Installed: 15 August 1950
- Term ended: 27 November 1978
- Predecessor: François Chaize MEP
- Successor: Joseph-Marie Trịnh Văn Căn
- Other post: Cardinal-Priest of San Francesco di Paola ai Monti (1976–1978)
- Previous post: Apostolic Vicar of Hà Nội & Titular Bishop of Synaus (1950–1960)

Orders
- Ordination: 1 April 1933 by Pierre-Jean-Marie Gendreau MEP
- Consecration: 15 August 1950 by Thaddeus Lê Hữu Từ O.Cist, Francisco Gómez de Santiago OP, Pierre-Marie Phạm Ngọc Chi
- Created cardinal: 24 May 1976 by Pope Paul VI
- Rank: Cardinal Priest

Personal details
- Born: 11 December 1898 Tràng Duệ, Hà Nam, Tonkin
- Died: 27 November 1978 (aged 79) Hà Nội, Vietnam
- Motto: Sequere Me; (Follow Me); (Hãy theo Thầy)
- Styles
- Reference style: His Eminence
- Spoken style: Your Eminence
- Informal style: Cardinal
- See: Hanoi

Joseph-Marie Trịnh Như Khuê (11 December 1898 – 27 November 1978) was a Vietnamese Catholic prelate who served as the first Archbishop of Hà Nội from 1960 to 1978, having previously served as its apostolic vicar of Hà Nội from 1950 until its elevation to an archdiocese. He was elevated to the cardinalate in 1976, becoming the first cardinal from Vietnam.

== Biography ==
Trịnh Như Khuê was born in Tràng Duệ, Bình Lục, Hà Nam and ordained to the priesthood on 1 April 1932. On 18 April 1950, he was appointed Apostolic Vicar of Hanoi and Titular Bishop of Synaus by Pope Pius XII. Khuê received his episcopal consecration on the following 15 August from Bishop Thaddeus Lê Hữu Từ, OCist, with Bishops Francisco Gomez de Santiago, OP, and Peter Phạm Ngọc Chi serving as co-consecrators, in the Cathedral of Hanoi. He was later raised to the rank of a Metropolitan Archbishop upon his vicariate's elevation to a metropolitan see on 24 November 1960.

The archbishop was reserved as a cardinal in pectore by Pope Paul VI when the consistory was announced on April 28, 1976, and was published and created Cardinal Priest of S. Francesco di Paola ai Monti at the consistory on 24 May of that same year. Khue attended the consistory in the purple clerical dress of a bishop, because he did not have time to get red ones. He was the first cardinal to hail from Vietnam, and was also the eldest of the cardinal electors who participated in the conclaves of August and October 1978, which selected Popes John Paul I and John Paul II respectively.

Cardinal Khuê died in Hanoi, at the age of 79; he had been the ecclesiastical leader of Hanoi for twenty-eight years. He is buried in St. Joseph's Cathedral, Hanoi.
