= Diocese of Hưng Hóa =

Roman Catholic diocese in Vietnam

Coordinates: 21.1429°N 105.5058°E

Diocese of Hưng Hóa Dioecesis Hung Hoaensis Giáo Phận Hưng Hóa

Catholic
- Coat of arms of Bishop Tiến

Location
- Country: Vietnam
- Ecclesiastical province: Hà Nội

Statistics
- Area: 58,000 km^{2} (22,000 sq mi)
- Population: Total; Catholics: (as of 2021); 8,010,300; 267,400 (3.3%)
- Parishes: 160

Information
- Denomination: Catholic Church
- Sui iuris church: Latin Church
- Rite: Roman Rite
- Established: 15 April 1895 - Established as Apostolic Vicariate; 24 November 1960 - Elevated as Diocese
- Cathedral: Cathedral of Saint Thérèse the Little Flower of Jesus (Sơn Lộc)
- Patron saint: Our Lady of the Immaculate Conception

Current leadership
- Pope: Leo XIV
- Bishop: Dominic Hoàng Minh Tiến
- Metropolitan Archbishop: Joseph Vũ Văn Thiên
- Auxiliary Bishops: Paul Nguyễn Quang Ðĩnh
- Bishops emeritus: Jean Marie Vũ Tất

Website
- Website of the Diocese

The diocese of Hưng Hóa (Latin: Dioecesis Hung Hoaënsis) is a Roman Catholic diocese of Vietnam.

== History ==
François-Marie Savina served in the Hưng Hóa area for 40 years.

The current Bishop is Dominic Hoang Minh Tien.

The creation of the diocese in present form was declared November 24, 1960.

The diocese covers an area of 54,351 km^{2}, and is a suffragan diocese of the Archdiocese of Hanoi.

By 2004, the diocese of Hung Hóa had about 198,000 believers (3.1% of the population), 24 priests and 73 parishes. In 2011, it had 222,647 Catholics, 54 priests, and 191 religious.

Saint Therese of the Child Jesus Cathedral in Trung Son Tay commune (Hà Tây Province) has been assigned as the Cathedral of the diocese.

== Ordinaries ==
=== Vicar Apostolic of Upper Tonking (1895-1924) ===
Vicar apostolic		Period in office	Status	Reference
1	Bishop Paul-Marie Ramond, M.E.P.	April 18, 1895 – December 03, 1924	Remained as vicar apostolic of Hưng Hóa.	

=== Vicar Apostolics of Hưng Hóa (1924-1960) ===
Vicar apostolic		Period in office	Status	Reference
1	Bishop Paul-Marie Ramond, M.E.P.	December 03, 1924 – May 21, 1938	Resigned	
2	Bishop Gustave-Georges-Arsène Vandaele, M.E.P.	May 21, 1938 – November 21, 1943	Died in office	
3	Bishop Jean-Marie Mazé, M.E.P.	January 11, 1945 – March 05, 1960	Resigned	
4	Bishop Pierre Nguyễn Huy Quang	March 05, 1960 – November 24, 1960	Remained as bishop of Hưng Hóa.	

=== Bishops of Hưng Hóa (1960-present) ===
Bishop		Coat of Arms	Period in office	Status	Reference
1	Bishop Pierre Nguyễn Huy Quang		November 24, 1960 – November 14, 1985	Died in office	
2	Bishop Joseph Phan Thế Hinh		November 14, 1985 – January 22, 1989	Died in office	
3	Bishop Joseph Nguyễn Phụng Hiểu		December 03, 1990 – May 09, 1992	Died in office	
4	Bishop Antoine Vũ Huy Chương		August 05, 2003 – March 01, 2011	Transferred to Đà Lat	
5	Bishop Jean Marie Vũ Tất		March 01, 2011 – August 29, 2020	Resigned	
–	Bishop Pierre Nguyễn Văn Viên		August 29, 2020 – December 18, 2021	Apostolic administrator	
6	Bishop Dominic Hoàng Minh Tiến		December 18, 2021 – present	Current bishop	

Coadjutor Vicar Apostolic of Hưng Hóa (1936-1938)

Coadjutor Vicar Apostolic		Period in office	Reference
1	Bishop Gustave-Georges-Arsène Vandaele, M.E.P.	July 07, 1936 – May 21, 1938	

Coadjutor Bishop of Hưng Hóa (1976-1985)

Coadjutor Bishop		Period in office	Reference
1	Bishop Joseph Phan Thế Hinh	April 14, 1976 – November 14, 1985	

Auxiliary Bishop of Hưng Hóa

Auxiliary Bishop		Coat of Arms	Period in office	Reference
1	Bishop Jean Marie Vũ Tất		March 29, 2010 – March 01, 2011	
2	Bishop Alphonse Nguyễn Hữu Long, P.S.S.		June 15, 2013 – December 22, 2018	
3	Bishop Paul Nguyễn Quang Ðĩnh		March 15, 2025 – present	
