= Diocese of Thanh Hóa =

Roman Catholic diocese in Vietnam

Diocese of Thanh Hóa Dioecesis de Thanh Hoa Giáo phận Thanh Hóa

Catholic
- Coat of arms of Bishop Cường

Location
- Country: Vietnam
- Ecclesiastical province: Hà Nội

Statistics
- Area: 11,700 km^{2} (4,500 sq mi)
- Population: Total; Catholics: (as of 2022); 4,164,140; 159,797 (3.8%)
- Parishes: 99

Information
- Denomination: Catholic
- Sui iuris church: Latin Church
- Rite: Roman Rite
- Established: 5 May 1932 - Established as Apostolic Vicariate; 24 November 1960 - Elevated as Diocese
- Cathedral: Saint Anne Cathedral
- Patron saint: Saint Joseph

Current leadership
- Pope: Leo XIV
- Bishop: Joseph Nguyễn Đức Cường
- Metropolitan Archbishop: Joseph Vũ Văn Thiên

Website
- gpthanhhoa.org

The Diocese of Thanh Hóa (Latin: Dioecesis de Thanh Hoa) is a Roman Catholic diocese of Vietnam. The bishop since 2018 is Joseph Nguyễn Đức Cường. Of the three million persons living in its area about 3% are Roman Catholics.

The diocese covers an area of 11,168 km^{2}, and is a suffragan diocese of the Archdiocese of Hà Nôi. It was erected on May 7, 1932 as a Vicariate Apostolic. On November 24, 1960 it was elevated to a diocese.

Saint Anne Cathedral in Thanh Hoa city has been assigned as the Cathedral of the diocese.

== Ordinaries ==
=== Bishops of Thanh Hoá (1932–present) ===
Bishop		Coat of Arms	Period in office	Status	Reference
1	Bishop Louis-Christian-Marie de Cooman, M.E.P.		June 21, 1932 – December 05, 1960	Resigned	
2	Bishop Pierre Phạm Tần		December 05, 1960 – February 01, 1990	Died in office	
3	Bishop Barthélémy Nguyễn Sơn Lâm, P.S.S.		March 23, 1994 – October 09, 2003	Died in office	
4	Bishop Joseph Nguyễn Chí Linh		May 21, 2004 – October 29, 2016	Transferred to Huê.	
–	Archbishop Joseph Nguyễn Chí Linh		October 29, 2016 – April 25, 2018	Apostolic Administrator	
5	Bishop Joseph Nguyễn Đức Cường		April 25, 2018–present	Incumbent	

==== Coadjutor Vicar Apostolic of Thanh Hoá (1932-1960) ====
Coadjutor Vicar Apostolic		Period in office	Reference
–	Bishop-elect Pierre Phạm Tần	March 17, 1959 – November 24, 1960	

==== Coadjutor Bishop of Thanh Hoá (1960–present) ====
Coadjutor Vicar Apostolic		Period in office	Reference
–	Bishop-elect Pierre Phạm Tần	November 24, 1960 – December 05, 1960	
