= Diocese of Hà Tĩnh =

Roman Catholic diocese in Vietnam

Diocese of Hà Tĩnh Dioecesis Hatinhensis Giáo phận Hà Tĩnh

Catholic
- Coat of arms of Bishop Tuấn

Location
- Country: Vietnam
- Territory: Hà Tĩnh, Quảng Bình
- Ecclesiastical province: Hà Nội

Statistics
- Area: 14,091 km^{2} (5,441 sq mi)
- Population: Total; Catholics: (as of 2021); 2,414,607; 287,036 (11.9%)
- Parishes: 134

Information
- Denomination: Catholic Church
- Sui iuris church: Latin Church
- Rite: Roman Rite
- Established: 22 December 2018; 4 years ago as Diocese
- Cathedral: Saint Michael the Archangel Cathedral (Văn Hạnh)
- Patron saint: Mary, Mother of God
- Secular priests: 160

Current leadership
- Pope: Leo XIV
- Bishop: Louis Nguyễn Anh Tuấn
- Metropolitan Archbishop: Joseph Vũ Văn Thiên
- Bishops emeritus: Paul Nguyễn Thái Hợp OP

Map
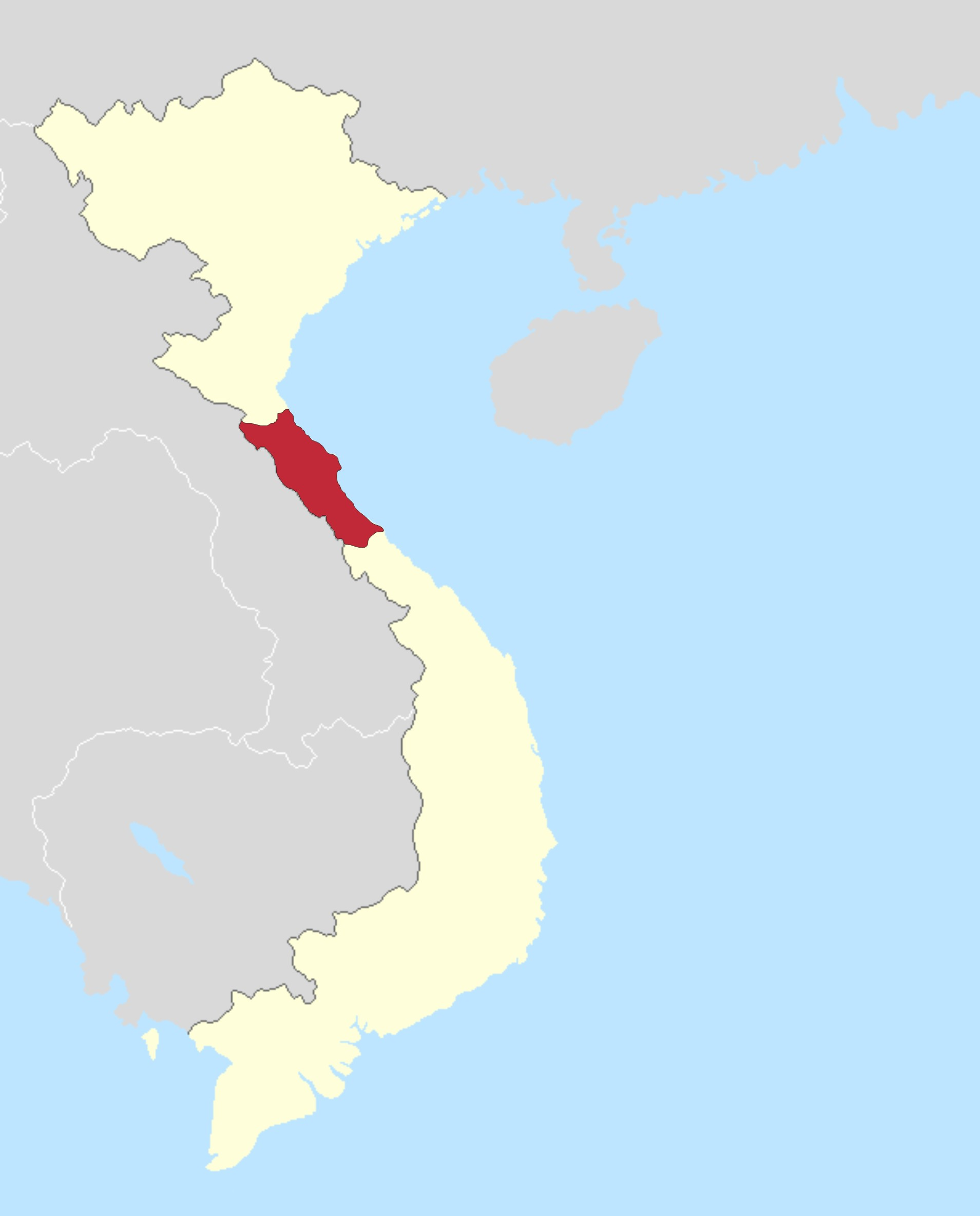

The Diocese of Hà Tĩnh (Latin: Dioecesis Hatinhensis) is a Roman Catholic diocese in central Vietnam. The diocese was erected on December 22, 2018.

== Ordinaries ==
Bishop		Coat of Arms	Period in office	Status	Reference
1	Bishop Paul Nguyễn Thái Hợp, O.P.		December 22, 2018 – March 19, 2021	Resigned	
–	Bishop Louis Nguyễn Anh Tuấn		March 19, 2021 – March 25, 2023	Apostolic administrator	
2	Bishop Louis Nguyễn Anh Tuấn		March 25, 2023 – present	Current bishop	
