= Diocese of Bắc Ninh =

Catholic diocese in Vietnam

Coordinates: 21.1801°N 106.0620°E

Diocese of Bac Ninh Dioecesis Bacninhensis Giáo phận Bắc Ninh

Catholic
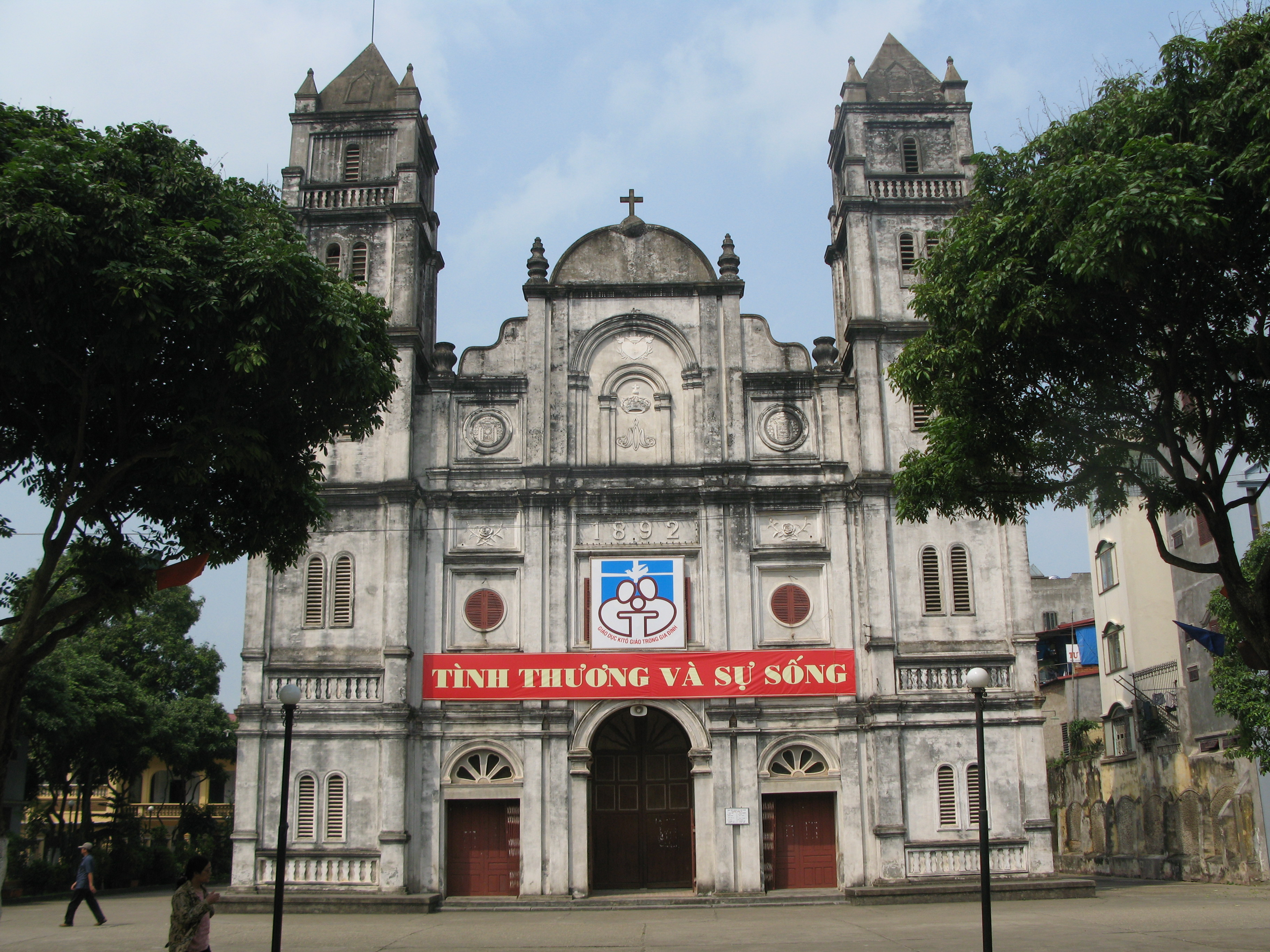
- Bắc Ninh Cathedral

- Coat of arms of Bishop Joseph Đỗ Quang Khang

Location
- Country: Vietnam
- Ecclesiastical province: Hà Nội

Statistics
- Area: 24,600 km^{2} (9,500 sq mi)
- Population: Total; Catholics: (as of 2022); 9,087,530; 147,715 (1.6%)
- Parishes: 93

Information
- Denomination: Catholic
- Sui iuris church: Latin Church
- Rite: Roman Rite
- Established: 1 June 1883; 141 years ago as Apostolic Vicariate; 24 November 1960; 63 years ago as Diocese
- Cathedral: Queen of the Most Holy Rosary Cathedral
- Patron saint: Our Lady of the Rosary, Martyrs of Bac Ninh
- Secular priests: 96

Current leadership
- Pope: Leo XIV
- Bishop: Joseph Đỗ Quang Khang
- Metropolitan Archbishop: Joseph Vũ Văn Thiên
- Bishops emeritus: Cosma Hoàng Vãn Ðat SJ

Website
- Website of the Diocese; Website of the Diocese

The diocese of Bac Ninh (Latin: Dioecesis Bacninhensis) is a Latin Catholic diocese of Vietnam.

The creation of the diocese in present form was declared November 24, 1960.

The diocese covers an area of 12,227 km^{2}, and is a suffragan diocese of the Archdiocese of Hanoi.

By 2004, the diocese of Bac Ninh had about 123,090 believers (1.8% of the population), 23 priests and 47 parishes.

Queen of the Rosary Cathedral in Bac Ninh has been assigned as the Cathedral of the diocese.

== Ordinaries ==
=== Vicars Apostolic of Northern Tonking (1883-1924) ===
| Vicar apostolic | | Period in office | Status | Reference |
|---|---|---|---|---|
| 1 | Bishop Antonio Colomer, O.P. | June 1, 1883 – February 7, 1902 | Died in office | |
| 2 | Bishop Maximino Velasco, O.P. | February 7, 1902 – December 3, 1924 | Remained as Vicar apostolic of Bac Ninh | |

=== Vicars Apostolic of Bac Ninh (1924-1960) ===
| Vicar apostolic | | Period in office | Status | Reference |
|---|---|---|---|---|
| 2 | Bishop Maximino Velasco, O.P. | December 3, 1924 – July 9, 1925 | Died in office | |
| 3 | Bishop Teodoro Gordaliza Sánchez, O.P. | July 9, 1925 – October 14, 1931 | Died in office | |
| 4 | Bishop Eugenio Artaraz Emaldi, O.P. | June 14, 1932 – December 19, 1947 | Died in office | |
| 5 | Bishop Dominique Hoàng Văn Ðoàn, O.P. | March 12, 1950 – 1955 | Transferred to Quy Nhon. | |
| – | Bishop Joseph-Marie-Pierre Khuất Văn Tạo | 1955 – April 05, 1963 | Apostolic Administrator | |

=== Bishops of Bắc Ninh (1963-present) ===
| Bishop | | Coat of Arms | Period in office | Status | reference |
|---|---|---|---|---|---|
| 1 | Paul Joseph Phạm Đình Tụng | | April 5, 1963 – March 23, 1994 | Appointed Archbishop of Hà Noi | |
| 2 | Joseph-Marie Nguyễn Quang Tuyến | | March 23, 1994 – September 24, 2006 | Died in office | |
| 3 | Cosma Hoàng Văn Ðạt, S.J. | | August 4, 2008 – June 17, 2023 | Resigned | |
| 4 | Joseph Đỗ Quang Khang | | June 17, 2023 – present | Current bishop | |

Coadjutor Vicar Apostolic of Northern Tonking (1889–1924)

| Coadjutor Vicar Apostolic | | Period in office | Reference |
|---|---|---|---|
| 1 | Bishop Maximino Velasco, O.P. | July 28, 1889 – February 7, 1902 | |
| 2 | Bishop Teodoro Gordaliza Sánchez, O.P. | August 10, 1915 – December 3, 1924 | |

Coadjutor Vicar Apostolic of Bac Ninh (1924–1925)

| Coadjutor Vicar Apostolic | | Period in office | Reference |
|---|---|---|---|
| 2 | Bishop Teodoro Gordaliza Sánchez, O.P. | December 3, 1924 – July 7, 1925 | |

Coadjutor Bishops of Bac Ninh (1988–2023)

| Coadjutor Bishop | | Coat of Arms | Period in office | Reference |
|---|---|---|---|---|
| 1 | Bishop Joseph-Marie Nguyễn Quang Tuyến | | December 15, 1988 – March 23, 1994 | |
| 2 | Bishop Joseph Đỗ Quang Khang | | October 30, 2021 – June 17, 2023 | |
