= Kẻ Sặt =

Coordinates: 20°55′N 106°09′E

Kẻ Sặt is a commune (xã) in Hải Phòng, Vietnam. It had a population of 4,954 people in 1994.
