= Joseph-Marie Trịnh Văn Căn =

Vietnamese Catholic cardinal (1921–1990)

His Eminence Joseph-Marie Trịnh Văn Căn
- Cardinal, Archbishop of Hà Nội
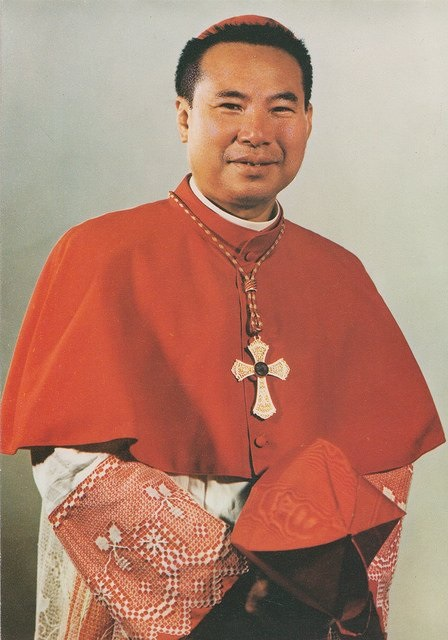
- Native name: Giuse Maria Trịnh Văn Căn
- Province: Hà Nội
- See: Hà Nội
- Appointed: 5 February 1963 (as Coadjutor)
- Installed: 27 November 1978
- Term ended: 18 May 1990
- Predecessor: Joseph-Marie Trịnh Như Khuê
- Successor: Paul Joseph Phạm Đình Tụng
- Other post: Cardinal-Priest of Santa Maria in Via (1979–1990)
- Previous post: Titular Archbishop of Aela & Coadjutor Archbishop of Hà Nội (1963-1978)

Orders
- Ordination: 3 December 1949 by François Chaize MEP
- Consecration: 2 June 1963 by Joseph-Marie Trịnh Như Khuê
- Created cardinal: 30 June 1979 by John Paul II
- Rank: Cardinal-Priest

Personal details
- Born: March 19, 1921 But Dong village, French Indochina (present-day Hà Nam Province, Vietnam)
- Died: May 18, 1990 (aged 69) Hanoi, Vietnam
- Motto: Caritas gaudiam pax longanimitas; (Love, joy, peace, hope); (Thương yêu, vui mừng, bình an, hy vọng)
- Styles
- Reference style: His Eminence
- Spoken style: Your Eminence
- Informal style: Cardinal
- See: Hanoi

Joseph-Marie Trịnh Văn Căn (19 March 1921 – 18 May 1990) was a Vietnamese Catholic cardinal who served as the second Archbishop of Hanoi from 1978 to 1990. He was created a cardinal in 1979 by Pope John Paul II.

Căn was born in Ha Nam. In 1949, he was ordained a priest. In 1963, Pope John XXIII appointed him to be a Titular Archbishop of Aela and Coadjutor Archbishop of Hanoi. Căn became Archbishop of Hanoi in 1978, after the death of Joseph-Marie Trịnh Như Khuê, and died on May 18, 1990, after a sudden heart attack, and was succeeded by Paul Joseph Phạm Đình Tụng.
