= Joseph Vũ Văn Thiên =

Vietnamese Catholic prelate (born 1960)

The Most Reverend Joseph Vũ Văn Thiên
- Archbishop of Hà Nôi
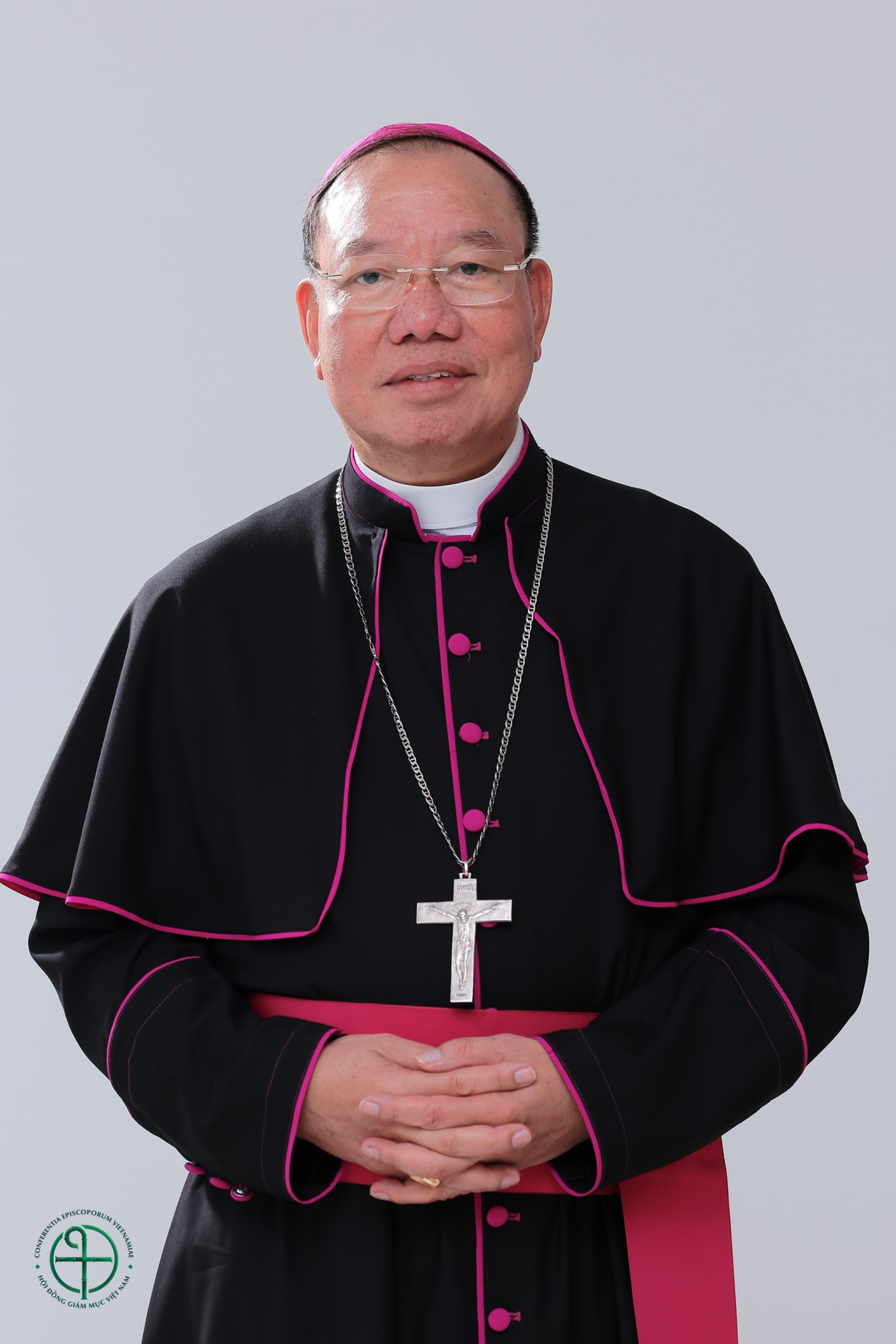
- Official portrait, 2024
- Native name: Giuse Vũ Văn Thiên
- Church: Catholic
- Archdiocese: Hà Nôi
- Province: Hà Nôi
- Appointed: 17 November 2018
- Installed: 18 December 2018
- Predecessor: Pierre Nguyễn Văn Nhơn
- Other post: Vice President, Catholic Bishops' Conference of Vietnam (2022–)
- Previous posts: Apostolic Administrator of Hải Phòng (2018–2022); Deputy General Secretary, CBCV (2016–2022); Bishop of Hải Phòng (2002–2018)

Orders
- Ordination: 24 January 1988 by Joseph Marie Nguyễn Tùng Cương
- Consecration: 2 January 2003 by Paul Joseph Phạm Đình Tụng

Personal details
- Born: Vũ Văn Thiên; 26 October 1960 (age 65) Kẻ Sặt, Hải Dương, North Vietnam
- Education: Institut Catholique de Paris
- Motto: Servientes in gaudium et spes; (Serve in joy and hope); (Phục vụ trong niềm vui và hy vọng)
- Styles
- Spoken style: Your Excellency
- Religious style: Archbishop

Joseph Vũ Văn Thiên (born 26 October 1960) is a Vietnamese Catholic prelate serving as the sixth Archbishop of Hà Nôi since 2018. He previously served as the third Bishop of Hải Phòng from 2002 to 2018.

== Biography ==
Vũ Văn Thiên was born in Ke Sat in Hải Dương Province on 26 October 1960. He has four siblings. He entered the Major Seminary of Saint Joseph in Hanoi in 1982 and completed his work in philosophy and theology there. He was ordained a priest of the Diocese of Hải Phòng on 24 January 1988.

He was the bishop's secretary from 1988 to 1994 and held parish assignments from 1988 to 1996. From 1996 to 2000, he studied at the Institut Catholique de Paris, earning his licentiate in theology.

He was Professor of Theology at the Major Seminary in Hanoi from 2000 to 2002.

Pope John Paul II named him Bishop of Hai Phòng on 26 November 2002 and he received his episcopal consecration on 2 January 2003 from Cardinal Paul Joseph Phạm Đình Tụng, Archbishop of Hanoi. In November 2017, Thien presided at a ceremony initiating construction of a church to replace a historic shrine dedicated to local martyrs that was destroyed in a U.S. air raid in 1967.

On 17 November 2018, Pope Francis named him to succeed Cardinal Pierre Nguyên Văn Nhon as Archbishop of Hà Nội.

Within the Catholic Bishops' Conference of Vietnam he heads the Committee on Youth.

== See also ==
- Catholic Church in Vietnam
