= List of Catholic dioceses in Vietnam =

The Catholic Church in Vietnam comprises solely a Latin rite hierarchy, joint in a national Catholic Bishops' Conference of Vietnam, comprising three metropolitan archdioceses and 24 suffragan dioceses.

There are no Eastern Catholic, (missionary) pre-diocesan or other exempt jurisdictions. There are no titular sees, all defunct jurisdictions have current Latin successor sees.

There formally is an Apostolic Delegation to Vietnam as papal diplomatic representation (residential, below embassy-level), but it is vested in the Apostolic Nunciature to Singapore.

== Current dioceses ==
Catholic dioceses in Vietnam

=== Ecclesiastical Province of Hà Nội ===
- Metropolitan Archdiocese of Hanoi
- Diocese of Bắc Ninh
- Diocese of Bùi Chu
- Diocese of Hà Tĩnh
- Diocese of Hải Phòng
- Diocese of Hưng Hóa
- Diocese of Lạng Sơn and Cao Bằng
- Diocese of Phát Diệm
- Diocese of Thái Bình
- Diocese of Thanh Hóa
- Diocese of Vinh

=== Ecclesiastical Province of Huế ===
- Metropolitan Archdiocese of Huế
- Diocese of Ban Mê Thuột
- Diocese of Đà Nẵng
- Diocese of Kon Tum
- Diocese of Nha Trang
- Diocese of Qui Nhơn

=== Ecclesiastical Province of Sài Gòn ===
- Metropolitan Archdiocese of Ho Chi Minh City (Saigon)
- Diocese of Bà Rịa
- Diocese of Cần Thơ
- Diocese of Đà Lạt
- Diocese of Long Xuyên
- Diocese of Mỹ Tho
- Diocese of Phan Thiết
- Diocese of Phú Cường
- Diocese of Vĩnh Long
- Diocese of Xuân Lộc

== See also ==
- List of Catholic dioceses of Asia
- Catholic Church in Vietnam
- Catholic Bishops' Conference of Vietnam

== Sources and external links ==
- GCatholic.org.
- Catholic-Hierarchy entry.
