= Trương Bửu Diệp =

Vietnamese Catholic priest (1897–1946)

Blessed Trương Bửu Diệp
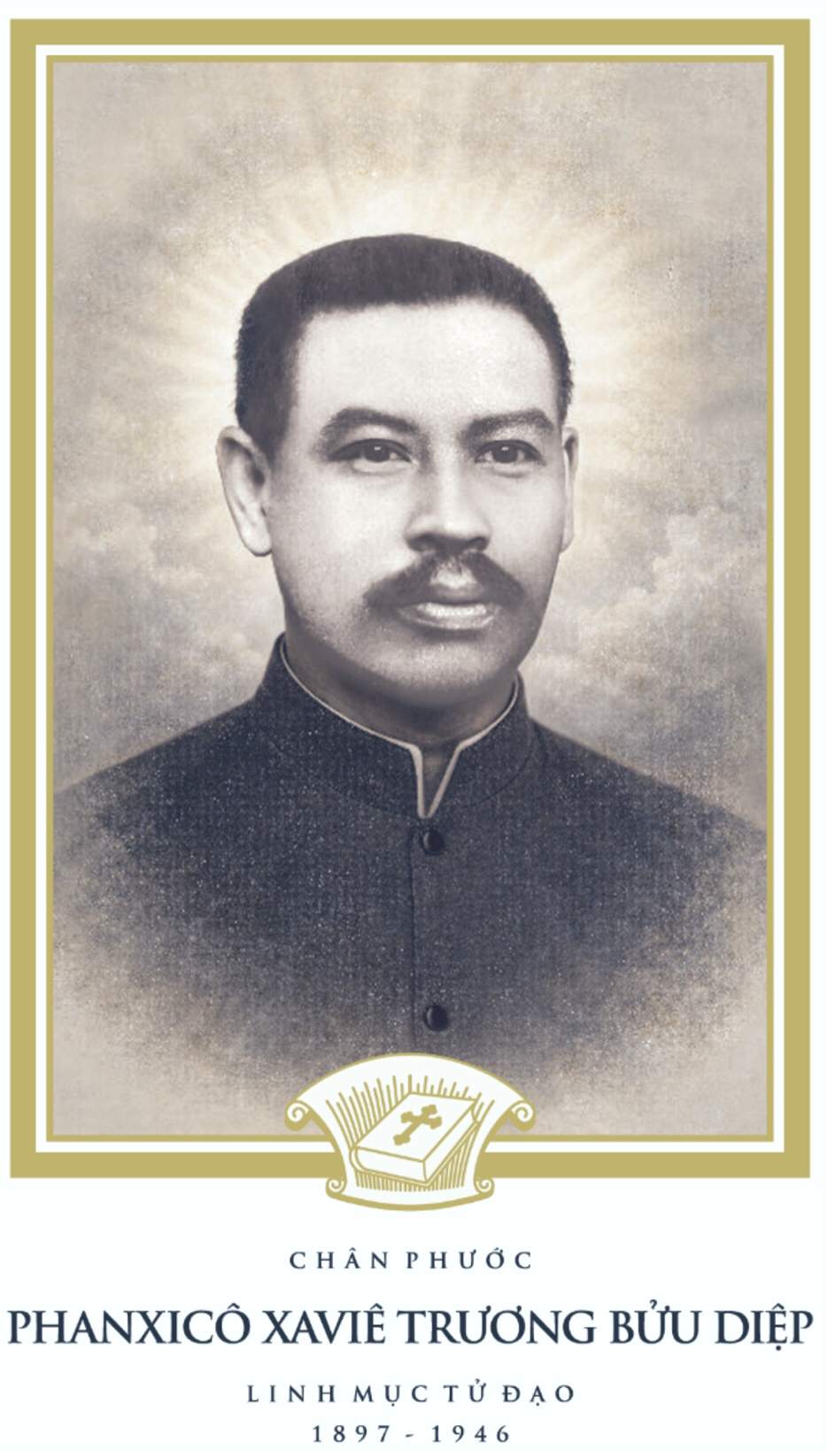

Martyr
- Born: 1 January 1897; Long Xuyên, Cochinchina, French Indochina (now An Giang, Việt Nam)
- Died: 12 March 1946 (aged 49); Bạc Liêu, Cochinchina, French Indochina
- Beatified: 2 July 2026, Tắc Sậy Church, Phong Thạnh, Cà Mau, Việt Nam by Cardinal Luis Antonio Tagle (on behalf of Pope Leo XIV)
- Feast: 12 March

Francis Xavier Truong Buu Diep (Vietnamese: Phanxicô Xaviê Trương Bửu Diệp; 1 January 1897 – 12 March 1946) was a Vietnamese Catholic priest who served the people of Bạc Liêu Province and was killed for the faith. Diệp was beatified in the Catholic Church on 2 July 2026 by Cardinal Luis Antonio Tagle on behalf of Pope Leo XIV at Tắc Sậy Church in Cà Mau.

== Biography ==
Born on 1 January 1897, in An Giang Province, Diệp was ordained in 1924 after completing his studies at Phnom Penh Major Seminary in Cambodia.

Upon his return to Vietnam, Diệp taught at a local seminary and served as a pastor of Tắc Sậy parish for 16 years. He also founded many parishes in Cambodia and Vietnam.

Diệp was arrested and killed in 1946 by two of three Japanese soldiers who, after the 1945 surrender of Japan, defected to Cao Triều Phát, (Note: Mistakenly called "Cao Trường Phát" by two interviewed witnesses) an anti-French Cao Đài resistance leader whose forces joined the Việt Minh in 1945, and who himself served as a local Việt Minh cadre. After World War II, with the ousting of the French and the surrender of Japan, the Vietnamese were locked in a civil strife over the destiny of their post-colonial state, while the French returned to reclaim their former colony.

Earlier, Diệp enlisted French land surveyors to help Tắc Sậy's church reclaim encroached lands and earned the hatred of Boss Cận, the encroacher. Cận went to Phát and accused Diệp of colluding with the French, who would exterminate the Cao Đài forces. Phát's two Japanese subordinates and other Cao Đài soldiers, possibly dispatched by Phát himself, imprisoned the Christians in a barn and plotted to burn them all alive, yet Diệp offered himself to be killed alone so other Christians could live; so the Japanese killed him and threw his naked and almost beheaded body into a shallow pool. Diệp's body was later drawn out and buried. Phát later had all three Japanese killed, because he either feared they would betray and likewise kill him as easily as they killed Diệp, or wanted to silence them.

== Veneration ==
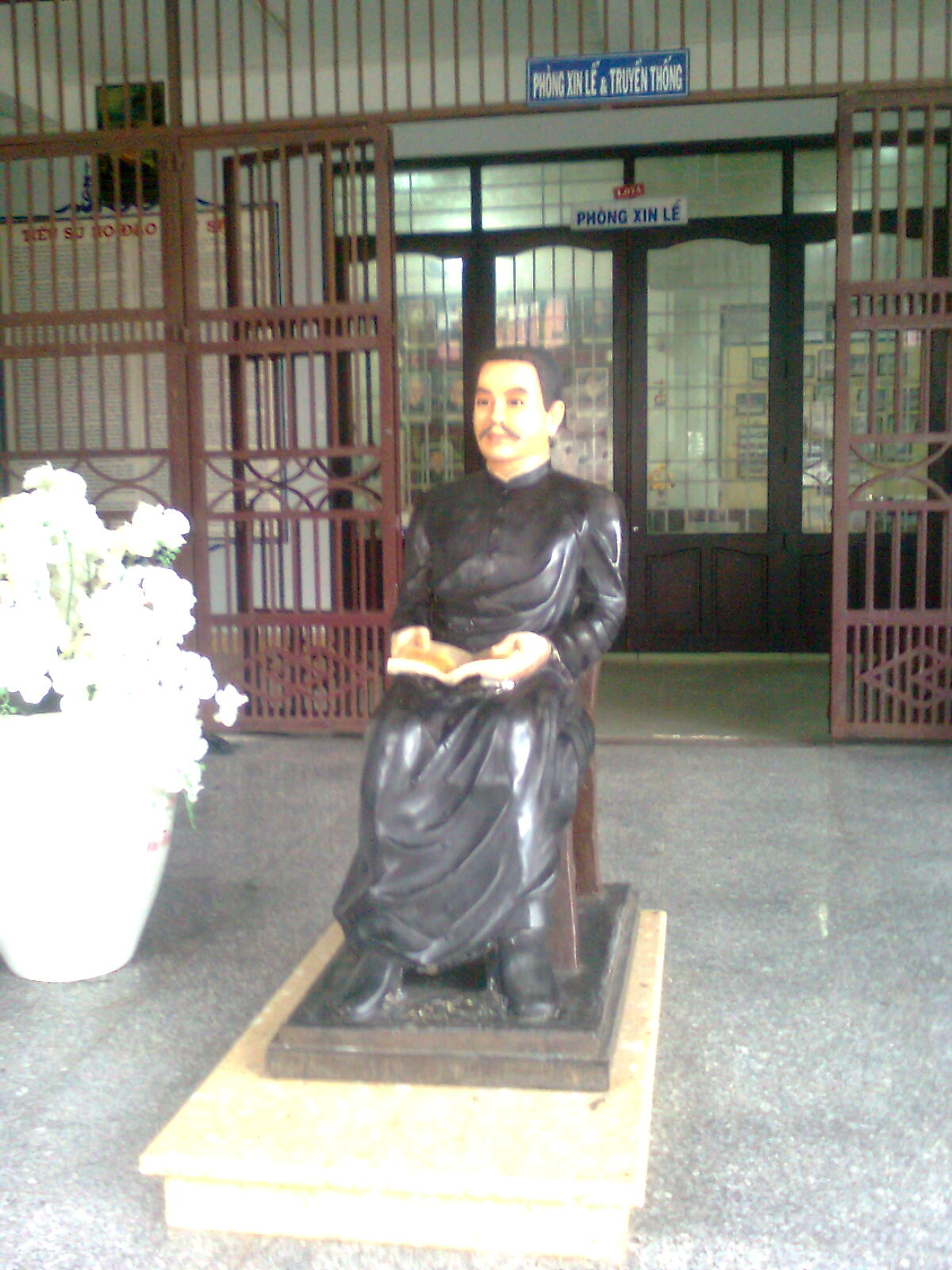
A statue of Diệp at Tắc Sậy parish

Often referred to simply as Cha Diệp ("Father Diep"), he is venerated by devotees and even non-Christians in the Mekong Delta. On 12 March 2016, the Diocese of Cần Thơ held the 70th anniversary of Diep's death. The event was attended by a large number of bishops – including Bishop of Cần Thơ, Stephen Tri Bửu Thiên; Bishop of Đà Lạt, Anton Vũ Huy Chương; Bishop of Mỹ Tho, Pierre Nguyễn Văn Khảm; and Bishop of Đà Nẵng, Joseph Châu Ngọc Tri.

=== Beatification ===
In 2012, an investigation was made to prepare for the beatification of Diep in the Catholic Church. On 31 October 2014, the Congregation for the Doctrine of the Faith issued a nihil obstat statement approving the process for Diep's beatification. In November 2024, Pope Francis signed a decree of martyrdom, clearing the way for his beatification, and granting him the title of Venerable.

On 18 December 2025, Bishop Peter Lê Tấn Lợi of Cần Thơ announced that the Holy See has confirmed the beatification of Diệp and on 2 July 2026, he was beatified by Cardinal Luis Antonio Tagle, Pro-Prefect of the Dicastery for Evangelization, at Tắc Sậy Church in Cà Mau.
