= Phạm Minh Mẫn =

Vietnamese Catholic cardinal (1934–2026)

His Eminence Phạm Minh Mẫn
- Cardinal, Archbishop of Hồ Chí Minh City
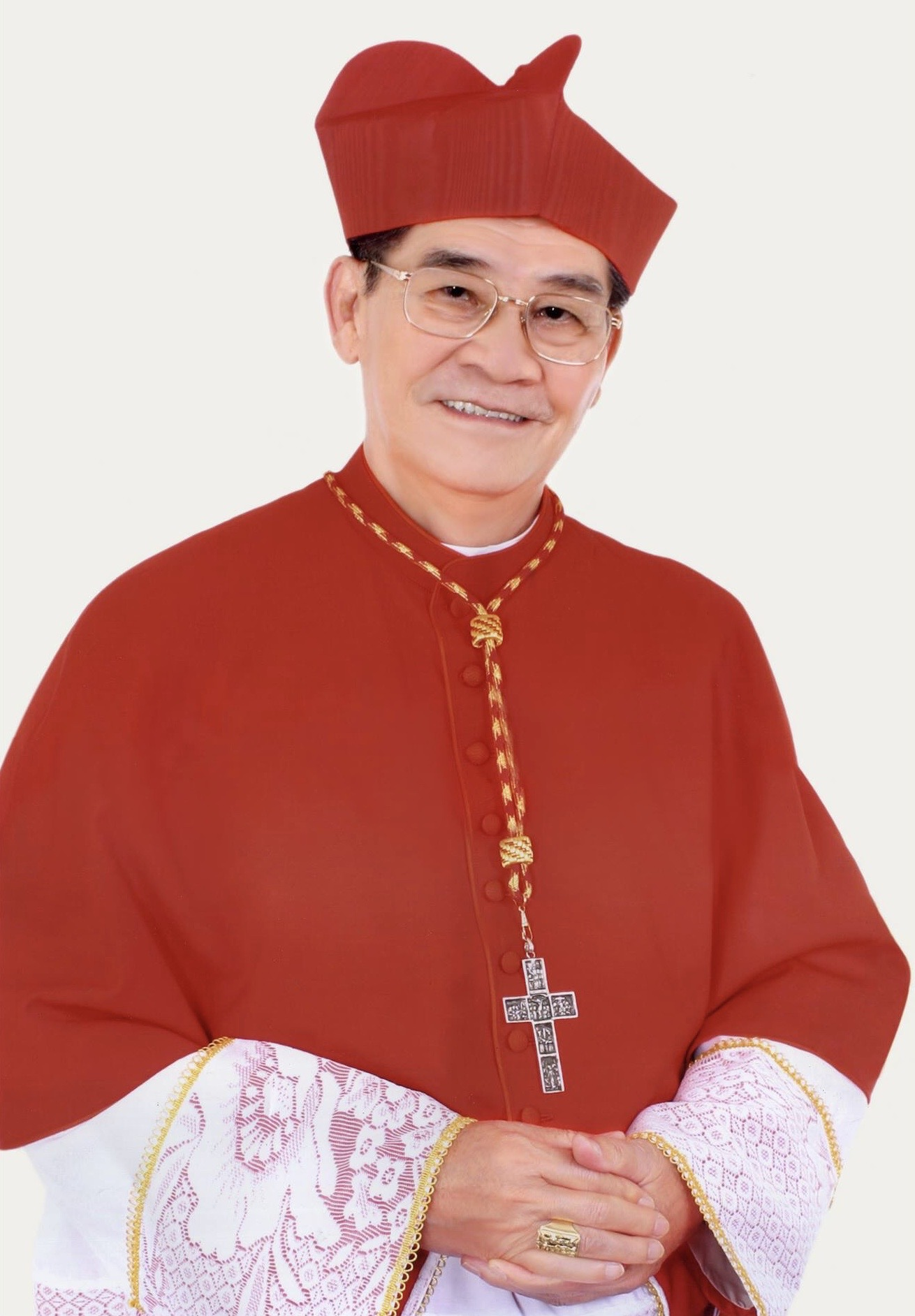
- Official portrait, 2003
- Native name: Gioan Baotixita Phạm Minh Mẫn
- Church: Catholic
- Province: Sài Gòn
- See: Hồ Chí Minh City
- Appointed: 1 March 1998
- Installed: 2 April 1998
- Term ended: 22 March 2014
- Predecessor: Paul Nguyễn Văn Bình
- Successor: Paul Bùi Văn Đọc
- Other post: Cardinal-Priest of San Giustino (2003–2026)
- Previous post: Coadjutor Bishop of Mỹ Tho (1993–1998)

Orders
- Ordination: 25 May 1965 by Jacques Nguyễn Ngọc Quang
- Consecration: 11 August 1993 by Emmanuel Lê Phong Thuận
- Created cardinal: 21 October 2003 by John Paul II
- Rank: Cardinal-Priest

Personal details
- Born: 5 March 1934 Cà Mau, Cochinchina, French Indochina
- Died: 22 March 2026 (aged 92) Ho Chi Minh City, Vietnam
- Buried: Chapel of the Archdiocesan Pastoral Center of Sài Gòn
- Denomination: Catholic
- Education: Loyola University of Los Angeles
- Motto: Sicut Dilexi (As I have loved) (Như Thầy yêu thương)
- Styles
- Reference style: His Eminence
- Spoken style: Your Eminence
- Informal style: Cardinal
- See: Hồ Chí Minh City

Ordination history
History
Priestly ordination
- Ordained by: James Nguyễn Ngọc Quang
- Date: 25 May 1965
Episcopal consecration
- Principal consecrator: Emmanuel Lê Phong Thuận
- Co-consecrators: François Xavier Nguyên Quang Sách; Joseph Marie Nguyễn Quang Tuyến
- Date: 11 August 1993
- Place: Saint Quý Major Seminary of Cần Thơ
Cardinalate
- Elevated by: Pope John Paul II
- Date: 21 October 2003
Episcopal succession
Bishops consecrated by Phạm Minh Mẫn as principal consecrator
- Paul Bùi Văn Đọc: 20 May 1999
- Joseph Vũ Duy Thống: 17 August 2001
- Pierre Nguyễn Văn Khảm: 15 November 2008

Jean-Baptiste Phạm Minh Mẫn (5 March 1934 – 22 March 2026) was a Vietnamese Catholic prelate who served as the second Archbishop of Ho Chi Minh City from 1998 to 2014. He also previously served as Coadjutor Bishop of Mỹ Tho from 1993 to 1998. He was created a cardinal in 2003 by Pope John Paul II.

== Biography ==
=== Early life ===
Mẫn was born in Cà Mau, Cochinchina, French Indochina on 5 March 1934. His great-grandfather was an emigrant from Guangdong. He is the eldest son of a family of seven children, the youngest of whom is also a priest of the Diocese of Cần Thơ. One of his sisters settled in Australia, while another sister settled in the United States.

When he was five, his first cousin once removed, Blessed Trương Bửu Diệp, encouraged him to enroll at the Catholic Institution Taberd in Saigon, then run by the De La Salle Brothers, the next year, which would make him eligible to attend the minor seminary once he turned ten. Diệp also encouraged his mother to let him learn the Latin prayers and allow him to become an altar boy.

=== Education ===
The family immediately followed Diệp's advice. Mẫn later recalled that he would go alone the next morning to serve as an altar boy when Diệp would celebrate Mass. He went to Taberd and eventually Cù Lao Giêng Minor Seminary until the seminary was burned down during the First Indochina War. He was ordained a priest on 25 May 1965 by Bishop Jacques Nguyễn Ngọc Quang, for the Diocese of Cần Thơ. After studying in the United States at Loyola University of Los Angeles, Mẫn taught at the Saint Quý Minor Seminary until he was appointed rector of the minor seminary in 1974 and of the local major seminary in 1988.

=== Episcopal career ===
Mẫn was appointed Coadjutor Bishop of Mỹ Tho in 1993 and promoted to Archbishop of Ho Chi Minh City in 1998.

In August 1999, he celebrated a Mass at La Vang for the closing of the jubilee year commemorating the 200th anniversary of the apparition of the Virgin Mary. The Mass was part of a three-day pilgrimage that was the largest Catholic event in Vietnam, with an estimated three hundred thousand people attending.

He was made a cardinal in the consistory of 21 October 2003 by Pope John Paul II. He was one of the cardinal electors who participated in the 2005 papal conclave that elected Pope Benedict XVI. On 7 March 2013, Mẫn was the last of the cardinal electors to arrive to attend the 2013 papal conclave, which elected Pope Francis.

On 28 September 2013, Pope Francis appointed Bishop Paul Bùi Văn Đọc, who had served as the Bishop of Mỹ Tho since 1999, as Coadjutor Archbishop with the right to succeed Mẫn. On 22 March 2014, Pope Francis accepted Mẫn's resignation as archbishop.

=== Death ===
Mẫn died at the Archdiocesan Pastoral Center of Sài Gòn on 22 March 2026, at the age of 92, exactly 12 years after his resignation as archbishop. He was surrounded by archdiocesan representatives, family, Archbishop Joseph Nguyễn Năng, and Bishop Joseph Bùi Công Trác. He was also visited by the papal representative to Vietnam, Archbishop Marek Zalewski, shortly before his death.

Catholic Church titles
Preceded by —	Coadjutor Bishop of Mỹ Tho; 22 March 1993 – 1 March 1998	Succeeded by —
Preceded by Paul Nguyễn Văn Bình	Archbishop of Thành-Phô Hô Chí Minh; 1 March 1998 – 22 March 2014	Succeeded by Paul Bùi Văn Đọc
Titular church created	Cardinal-Priest of San Giustino; 21 October 2003 – 22 March 2026	Vacant
