= Titular church =

Church in Rome that can be assigned to a cardinal of the Catholic Church

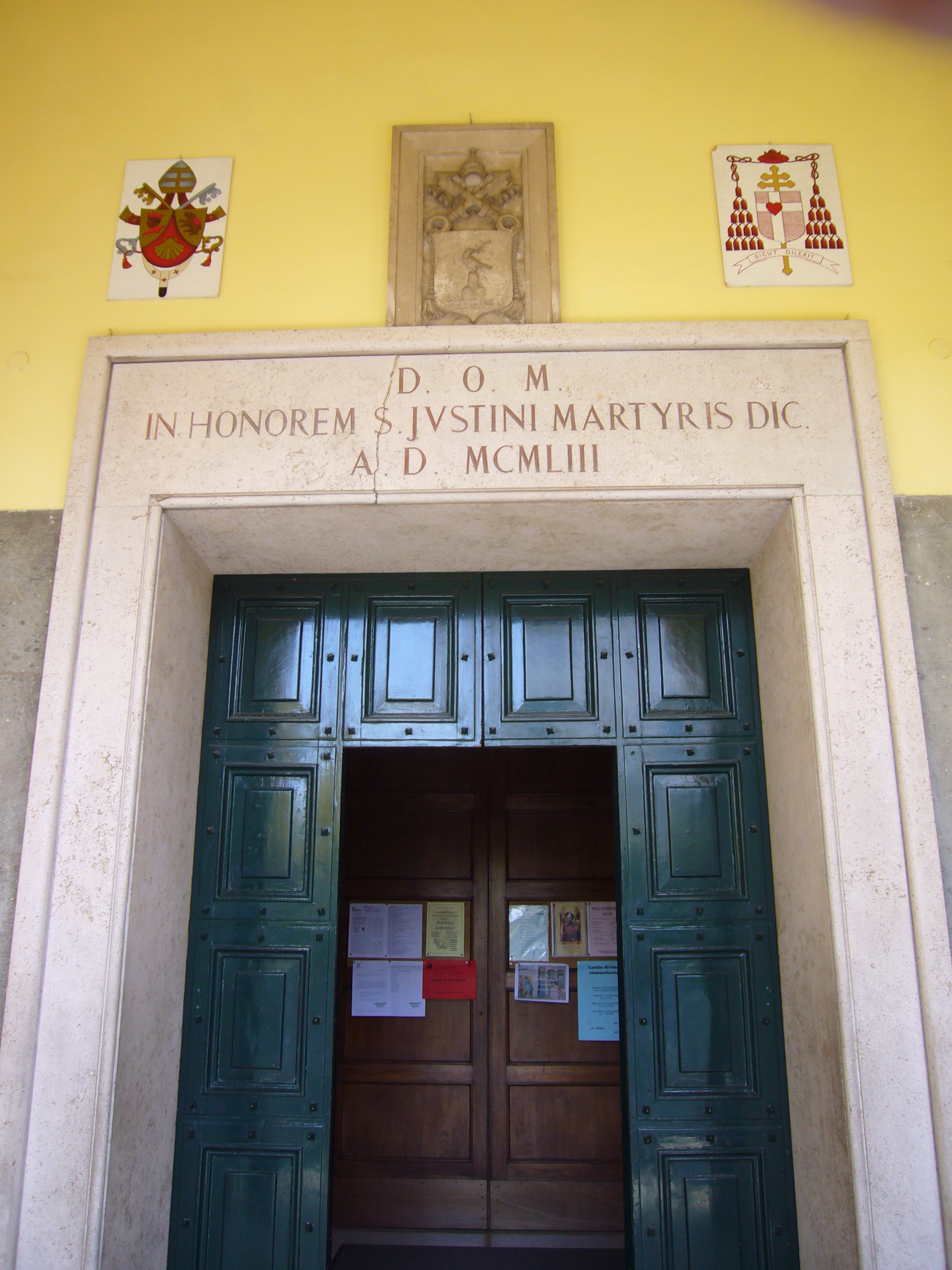
The church of San Giustino, Rome displays the arms of its titular cardinal at the time, Jean-Baptiste Phạm Minh Mẫn, at upper right.

In the Catholic Church, a titular church (Italian: titolo cardinalizio) is a church in Rome that is assigned to a member of the clergy who is created a cardinal. These are Catholic churches in the city, within the jurisdiction of the Diocese of Rome, that serve as honorary designations symbolising the relationship of cardinals to the pope, the bishop of Rome. According to the 1983 Code of Canon Law, a cardinal may assist his titular church through counsel or through patronage, although "he has no power of governance over it, and he should not for any reason interfere in matters concerning the administration of its goods, or its discipline, or the service of the church".

There are two ranks of titular churches: titles and deaconries. A title (Latin: titulus) is a titular church that is assigned to a cardinal priest (a member of the second order of the College of Cardinals), whereas a deaconry (Latin: diaconia) is normally assigned to a cardinal deacon (a member of the third order of the college). If a cardinal priest or a cardinal deacon is later appointed a cardinal bishop (a member of the first order of the college), he is typically transferred from his titular church to the vacant title of a suburbicarian diocese in the vicinity of Rome. Patriarchs of Eastern Catholic Churches who are created cardinal bishops are not assigned titles of suburbicarian dioceses.

A cardinal may request that he be transferred to another titular church in a consistory; in addition, when a cardinal deacon opts to become a cardinal priest (usually after ten years), he may request either that his deaconry be elevated pro hac vice ('for this occasion') to a title or that he be transferred from his deaconry to a vacant title. Other churches in Rome can also be established as new titular churches. Occasionally, a titular church may be held in commendam ('in trust') by a cardinal who has been transferred to a different titular church or to a suburbicarian diocese.

== History ==
Before the legalization of Christianity in Rome the tituli were private buildings used as Christian churches—also called domus ecclesiae or "house churches"—and each took the name of the owner of the building, either a wealthy donor, or a priest appointed by the Church authorities to run it. For instance, the Titulus Aemilianae, now the church of the Santi Quattro Coronati, drew its name from its foundress, who doubtless owned the extensive suburban Roman villa whose foundations remain under the church and whose audience hall became the ecclesiastical basilica. The most ancient reference to such a Roman church is in the Apology against the Arians of Athanasius in the fourth century, which speaks of a council of bishops assembled "in the place where the Priest Vitus held his congregation".

By the end of the 5th century such churches numbered 25, as is confirmed by the Liber Pontificalis. The same number, though with different identities, is given in the reports of councils held in Rome in 499 and 595. In 1120, however, the number is given as 28. In modern times, many more have received the status of "tituli" or titular churches, while others over the centuries have been abandoned. Some of the latter have been demolished by natural events, war or urban development.

In 1059, the right of electing the pope was reserved to the bishops of the seven suburbicarian sees, the priests in charge of the "tituli" churches, and the clergy in charge of the deaconries. These were known collectively as the cardinals. Given the importance of this privilege, the term "cardinal" came to be understood as bestowing high rank.

Accordingly, when it became customary to attribute for honorific reasons the title of cardinal to ecclesiastics living outside Rome, each was assigned nominal responsibility for one or other of the Roman churches, a legal fiction establishing their position within the Pope's diocese of Rome. It was understood that they had no obligation to reside in Rome, and so were not personally responsible for the pastoral care of the titular churches assigned to them. This practice is still in force today.

== Present situation ==
Today, the cardinal priests have a loose patronal relationship with their titular churches, whose cardinal protector they are called. Their names and coats of arms are inscribed on plaques in the churches, they are expected to preach at the church occasionally when they are in Rome, and many raise funds for their church's maintenance and restoration, but they no longer participate in the actual management of the churches. There are (as of 2015) 160 presbyteral titular churches.

Many cardinals are assigned to tituli with some connection to their home see or country, such as the national churches in Rome. For example, Jean-Claude Turcotte, former archbishop of Montreal, was made Cardinal Priest of the Santi Martiri Canadesi (Holy Canadian Martyrs); André Vingt-Trois, former Archbishop of Paris, was the cardinal priest of San Luigi dei Francesi (St. Louis, King of France).

== Cardinal deacons ==
In the wider sense, the term titular church is also loosely applied to the deaconries diaconiae in Rome assigned to the cardinal-deacons.

Originally, a deaconry was a charitable institution in Christian Rome, first mentioned in connection with Pope Benedict II (684–685). It would seem that in an early period there were seven deaconries, each corresponding to one of the seven divisions of the city. As the terms implies, each was entrusted to a deacon. Pope Adrian I (772–795) fixed their number at 18, a number that remained constant until the 16th century.

Since the medieval period, men appointed cardinal deacons are often holders of high office in the Roman Curia. However, there have also been some recent developments since it was established that cardinals over the age of 80 would not participate in the conclave that elects a new Pope. Despite this new rule, the Popes have continued to appoint as cardinals a limited number of priests or bishops who have already reached 80 years of age. Often such men are assigned to the order of cardinal deacons. Among the cases that may arise are those of a bishop or archbishop who is widely esteemed but is not made a cardinal for some specific (though rarely publicly announced) reason. It may be, for example, that such an appointment, given while he is under the age of 80, would increase in a disproportionate way the number of cardinals from a single country eligible to participate in the next conclave, or else it would risk creating an expectation that his successors will in future necessarily be made cardinals, too. In other cases, it has become the custom for the Pope to appoint from time to time as cardinals a small number of highly regarded theologians who have already reached the age of 80. Often in these cases, the rank assigned has been that of cardinal deacon.

There is also a practice of changing the rank of the cardinalatial church from deaconry to priestly title or vice versa, permanently or, as the phrase goes, pro hac vice (for this turn). For instance, a man appointed a cardinal deacon will by definition be assigned a church that has the rank of a "deaconry". It is customary for a cardinal deacon, after ten years, to be able to petition for promotion to the rank of cardinal priest. This is usually granted. In this case, he may be assigned a completely different cardinalatial church which has the rank of a "titulus". However, a commonly used alternative procedure is to raise the church to which he is already attached pro hac vice to the rank of a "titulus".

In 2015 there were 67 "deaconries" assigned or assignable to one of the cardinals.

== Cardinal bishops ==
The cardinal bishops were originally the successors of the residential bishops who governed the seven dioceses around Rome known as suburbicarian dioceses. They had varying roles in the running of the diocese of Rome, sometimes functioning similarly to present-day auxiliary bishops. Cardinal bishops are now honorarily granted the title of a suburbicarian diocese, with the dean of the College of Cardinals additionally gaining that of Ostia.

Patriarchs of Eastern Catholic Churches who become cardinals (individually, not by right of their office) constitute an exception: their own patriarchal see is counted as their cardinal title. They belong to the order of cardinal bishops and, in the order of precedence, come before the cardinal priests and immediately after the cardinals who hold the titles of the seven suburbicarian sees.

== See also ==
- List of titular churches in Rome, listing present titular churches and their incumbents
- Churches of Rome
- Suburbicarian diocese

== Bibliography ==
- Balch, David L. (2008). Roman Domestic Art and Early House Churches. Tubingen: Mohr Siebeck. ISBN 978-3-16-149383-6.
- Barker, Ethel Ross (1913). "VI". Rome of the Pilgrims and Martyrs: A Study in the Martyrologies, Itineraries, Syllogae, & Other Contemporary Documents. London: Methuen & Company, Limited. p. 325.
- Belardo, Mario (1939). De iuribus Sanctae Romanae Ecclesiae cardinalium in titulis (in Latin). Rome: Typis Polyglottis Vaticanis.
- Bez, Henricus Antonius (1767). Diss. de origine et antiquitate eminentissimorum S. R. C. cardinalium (in Latin). Heidelberg: Haener.
- Duchesne, Louis (1887). "Les titres presbyteraux et les diaconies," Mélanges d'archéologie et d'histoire (in French). Vol. VII. Paris-Rome: École franca̧ise de Rome. 1887. pp. 217–243.
- Hülsen, Christian (1927). Le chiese di Roma nel medio evo: cataloghi ed appvnti. Hildesheim: Georg Olms Verlag. ISBN 978-3-487-40631-2.
- Kehr, Paul Fridolin (1906). Italia pontificia, I: Roma. Berlin: Weidmann. pp. 1–7.
- Kirsch, Johann Peter (1919). Die römischen Titelkirchen im Altertum. Studien zur Geschichte und Kultur des Altertums, 9. Bd., 1. und 2. Hft (in German). Paderborn: F. Schöningh.
- H. W. Klewitz, "Die Entstehung des Kardinalskollegiums," Zeitschrift der Savigny-Stiftung für Rechtsgeschichte. Kanonische Abteilung 25 (1936), 115–221.
- Krautheimer, R., Corpus Basilicarum Christianarum Romae, vol. 3.
- Kuttner, Stephan (1945). "Cardinalis: The History of a Canonical Concept". Traditio. 3: 129–214. doi:10.1017/S0362152900016883. JSTOR 27830076.
- Lanzoni, Francesco (1925). "I titoli presbiteriali di Roma antica nella storia e nella leggenda," Rivista di archeologia cristiana II (1925), 195–257. (in Italian)
- Richardson, Carol M., Reclaiming Rome: cardinals in the fifteenth century, Leiden: Brill, 2009. ISBN 978-90-04-17183-1
- Witte, Arnold (2020). "Cardinals and Their Titular Churches". In Mary Hollingsworth, Miles Pattenden and Arnold Witte (eds.), A Companion to the Early Modern Cardinal (pp. 333–350). (Brill's Companions to the Christian Tradition; Vol. 91). Brill. ISBN 978-90-04-41544-7
