= Pierre Nguyen =

Pierre Nguyen may refer to:

- Pierre Nguyễn Văn Nhơn (born 1938), Vietnamese cardinal
- Pierre Nguyễn Văn Khảm (born 1952), Vietnamese bishop

== See also ==
- Peter Nguyen (disambiguation)
