= Pierre Nguyễn Văn Khảm =

Vietnamese Catholic prelate (born 1952)

His Excellency, The Most Reverend Pierre Nguyễn Văn Khảm
- Bishop of Mỹ Tho
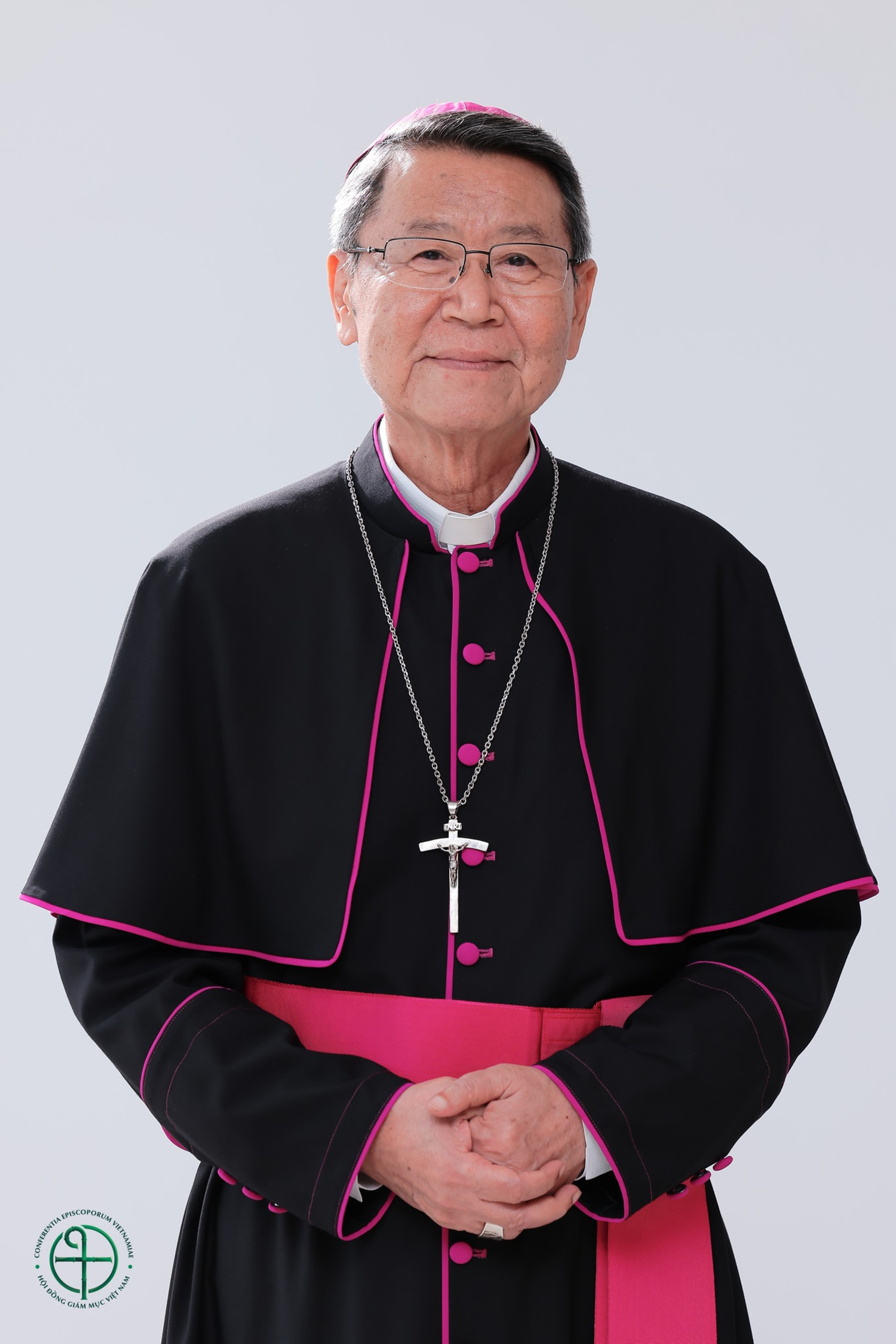
- Official portrait, 2024
- Native name: Phêrô Nguyễn Văn Khảm
- Province: Sài Gòn
- See: Mỹ Tho
- Appointed: 26 July 2014
- Installed: 30 August 2014
- Predecessor: Paul Bùi Văn Đọc
- Other post: Member, Dicastery for Communication (2016–)
- Previous posts: Secretary General, Catholic Bishops' Conference of Vietnam (2016–2022); Auxiliary Bishop of Hồ Chi Minh City & Titular Bishop of Trofimiana (2008–2014)

Orders
- Ordination: 30 August 1980 by Paul Nguyễn Văn Bình
- Consecration: 15 November 2008 by Jean-Baptiste Phạm Minh Mẫn

Personal details
- Born: 2 October 1952 (age 74) Hà Đông, Democratic Republic of Việt Nam
- Denomination: Catholic Church
- Education: Saint Joseph Major Seminary of Sài Gòn; Catholic University of America (PThD)
- Motto: Sequere Me; (Follow Me); (Hãy theo Thầy)
- Styles
- Reference style: His Excellency; The Most Reverend
- Spoken style: Your Excellency
- Religious style: Bishop

Ordination history
History
Priestly ordination
- Ordained by: Paul Nguyễn Văn Bình
Episcopal consecration
- Principal consecrator: Jean-Baptiste Phạm Minh Mẫn
- Co-consecrators: Stephen Tri Bửu Thiên; Joseph Vũ Duy Thống

Pierre Nguyễn Văn Khảm (born 2 October 1952) is a Vietnamese Catholic prelate serving as the fourth bishop of the Diocese of Mỹ Tho since 2014. Besides Vietnamese, he is also able to communicate in English, French, and Latin.

== Early life and education ==
Nguyễn Văn Khảm was born on 2 October 1952, in Hà Đông, in what was then the Democratic Republic of Việt Nam. His mother, Mary Magdalene Lý Thị Hảo, was born in 1926. In 1954, Khảm and his family fled to South Vietnam, as a part of Operation Passage to Freedom. From there, he began formation for the priesthood at Saint Quý Minor Seminary in Cái Răng, Cần Thơ in 1963. After finishing his studies there in 1972, he attended Saint Thomas Major Seminary in Long Xuyên from 1973 to 1976, and at Saint Joseph Major Seminary of Sài Gòn from 1977 to 1979 before he was ordained to the priesthood.

== Ordination and ministry ==
Khảm was ordained to the priesthood on 30 August 1980, for the Archdiocese of Ho Chi Minh City, and then served as parochial vicar at Ha Dong church (1980–1983). After three years of his first assignment, he was transferred to assume the position of parochial administrator of Ha Noi church. He served the parish until 1987, when he was transferred to Notre-Dame Cathedral Basilica of Saigon as parochial vicar and held this position until 1999. Since 1997, he has been a professor at Saint Joseph Seminary of Saigon, concurrently until 1999.

From 2000 to 2004, he furthered his studies at the Catholic University of America and earned a Doctorate of Pastoral Theology. After returning to Vietnam, he served as the Director of the Ho Chi Minh City Archdiocesan Pastoral Center.

== Episcopal ministry ==
=== Auxiliary Bishop of Ho Chi Minh City (2008-2014) ===
On 15 October 2008, Pope Benedict XVI appointed him the Auxiliary Bishop of Hồ Chi Minh City. On 15 November 2008, he was consecrated as bishop by Cardinal Jean-Baptiste Phạm Minh Mẫn of Hồ Chi Minh City. The co-consecrators were Coadjutor Bishop Stephen Tri Bửu Thiên of Cần Thơ and Auxiliary Bishop Joseph Vũ Duy Thống of Hồ Chi Minh City. He served as rector of Saint Joseph Seminary of Saigon from 2011 to 2013.

=== Bishop of Mỹ Tho (2014-present) ===
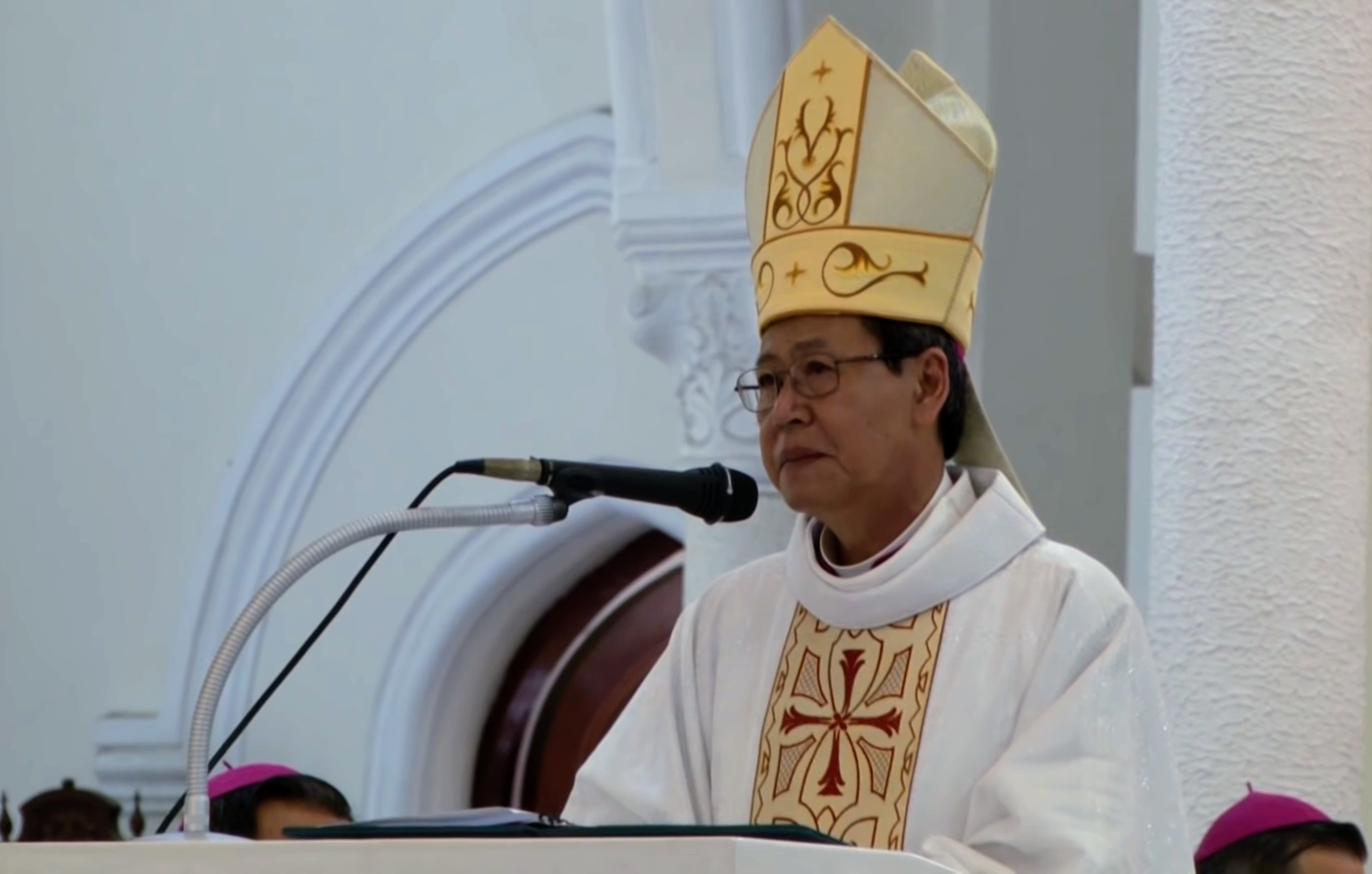
Khảm preached at his installation mass as Bishop of Mỹ Tho in 2014.

On 26 July 2014, he was appointed Bishop of Mỹ Tho by Pope Francis, and was installed on 30 August 2014.

Within the Catholic Bishops' Conference of Vietnam, he has served as General Secretary from 2016 to 2022. His previous posts were Deputy General Secretary (2010–2016) and Chair of the Committee on Social Communications (2010–2013).

On 13 July 2016, Pope Francis appointed Khảm as a member of the Dicastery for Communication.

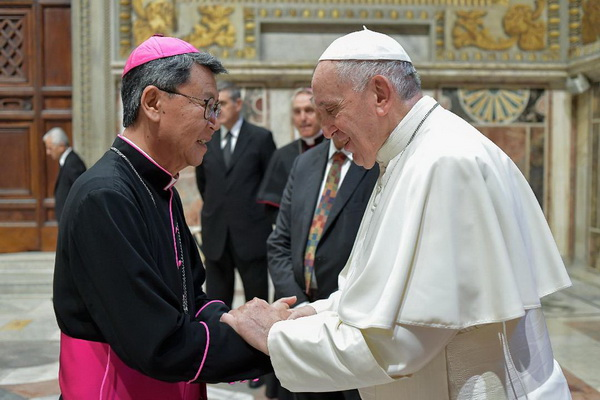
Bishop Pierre Khảm met with Pope Francis during the meeting of the Dicastery for Communication in 2019.

== Notes ==
Catholic Church titles
Preceded by Joseph Vũ Duy Thống	Auxiliary Bishop of Ho Chi Minh City; 2008–2014	Succeeded by vacant
Preceded by Paul Bùi Văn Đọc	Bishop of Mỹ Tho; 2014–now	Succeeded by incumbent
