= San Giustino, Rome =

Chiesa di San Giustino
- St. Justin (in English); Sancti Iustini (in Latin)
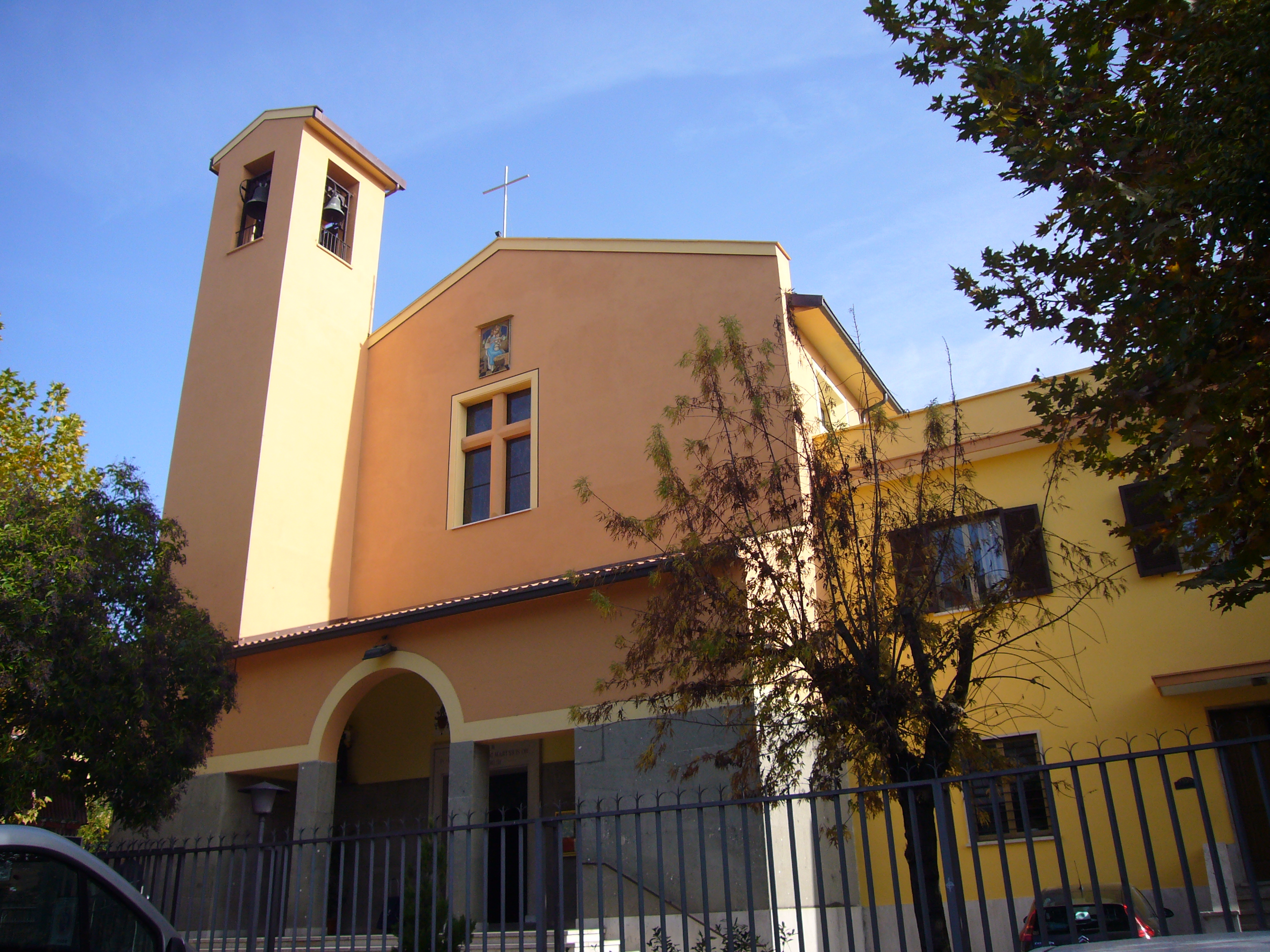
- Facade
- Click on the map for a fullscreen view
- 41°52′26″N 12°34′49″E
- Location: Viale Alessandrino 144, Rome
- Country: Italy
- Denomination: Roman Catholic
- Tradition: Roman Rite
- Website: Official website

History
- Status: Titular church
- Dedication: Justin Martyr
- Consecrated: 1953

Architecture
- Architect: Francesco Fornari
- Architectural type: Church
- Style: Vernacular
- Groundbreaking: 1952
- Completed: 1953

Administration
- District: Lazio
- Province: Rome

The church of San Giustino is a church in Rome, in the neighborhood of Alexandria, in Alexandria Avenue.

== History ==
The building of the parish church was erected, designed by architect Francesco Fornari, June 10, 1952 with the decree of the Cardinal Vicar Clemente Micara "To care vigilant" and was inaugurated by the 29 May 1953. He was first assigned to diocesan clergy of Rome (1952-1965) to the clergy of the diocese of Bergamo. The church was visited by Pope John Paul II November 14, 1982.

John Paul II elevated the church in 2003 to the status of a titular church for a cardinal priest. Jean-Baptiste Cardinal Pham Minh Man is its first and recent titular.

== List of Cardinal Protectors ==
- Phạm Minh Mẫn, Archbishop of Ho Chi Minh City (21 October 2003 – 22 March 2026)
