= Diocese of Đà Lạt =

Roman Catholic diocese in Vietnam

Coordinates: 11.9365°N 108.4376°E

Diocese of Ðà Lat Dioecesis Dalatensis Giáo phận Ðà Lạt

Catholic
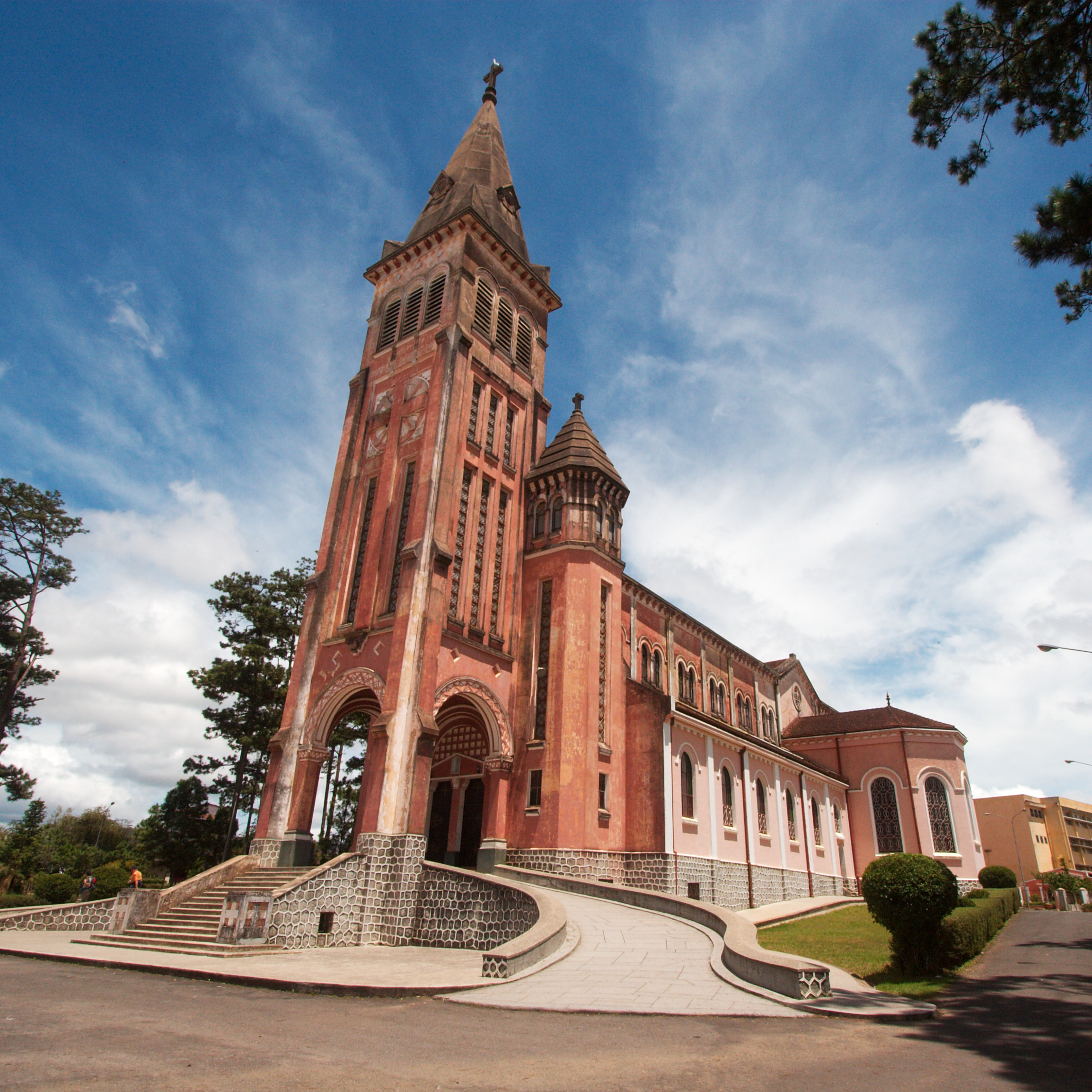
- St. Nicholas Cathedral

- Coat of arms of Bishop Mạnh

Location
- Country: Vietnam
- Ecclesiastical province: Sài Gòn

Statistics
- Area: 9,764 km^{2} (3,770 sq mi)
- Population: Total; Catholics: (as of 2022); 1,464,100; 417,680 (28.5%)

Information
- Denomination: Catholic
- Sui iuris church: Latin Church
- Rite: Roman Rite
- Established: 24 November 1960
- Cathedral: Cathedral of Saint Nicholas of Bari
- Patron saint: Our Lady of the Rosary

Current leadership
- Pope: Leo XIV
- Bishop: Dominic Nguyễn Văn Mạnh
- Metropolitan Archbishop: Joseph Nguyễn Năng
- Bishops emeritus: Antoine Vũ Huy Chương

Website
- giaophandalat.com

The Diocese of Đà Lat (Latin: Dioecesis Dalatensis) is a Latin suffragan diocese of Roman Catholic church in the ecclesiastical province of the Metropolitan of the Archdiocese of Saigon in southern Vietnam, yet depends on the missionary Dicastery for Evangelization.

Its cathedral episcopal see is Cathedral of Saint Nicholas of Bari, in the southern city of Da Lat, Lâm Đồng Province, Central Highlands.

Its present Bishop is Dominic Nguyễn Văn Mạnh, since September 16, 2019.

== Statistics and extent ==
As per 2014, it pastorally served 368,487 Catholics (27.8% of 1,325,000 total) on 9,764 km^{2} in 87 parishes and 16 missions with 259 priests (143 diocesan, 116 religious), 1,413 lay religious (501 brothers, 912 sisters) and 69 seminarians. Many of its faithful belong to ethnic minorities.

== History ==
- The bishopric was created on November 24, 1960, as Diocese of Đà Lat / Ðàlạt (Tiếng Việt) / 大叻 (正體中文) / Dalaten(sis) (Latin), on territories split off from the then Apostolic Vicariate of Saigon and the then Apostolic Vicariate of Kontum
- On 22 June 1967 it lost territory to establish the Diocese of Ban Mê Thuôt.

== Ordinaries ==
Bishops		Coat of Arms	Period in office	Status	Reference
Bishops of Đà Lat
1	Simon Hoà Nguyễn Văn Hiền		November 24, 1960 – September 05, 1973	Died in office	
2	Barthélémy Nguyễn Sơn Lâm, P.S.S.		January 30, 1975 – March 23, 1994	Died in office	
3	Pierre Nguyễn Văn Nhơn		March 23, 1994 – April 22, 2010	Became Coadjutor bishop of Hanoi	
4	Antoine Vũ Huy Chương		March 01, 2011 – September 14, 2019	Resigned	
5	Dominic Nguyễn Văn Mạnh		September 14, 2019 – present	Current bishop	

Coadjutor Bishops

- Bishop Pierre Nguyễn Văn Nhơn (later Cardinal) (1991.10.11 – 1994.03.23)
- Bishop Dominic Nguyễn Văn Mạnh (2017.04.08 – 2019.09.14)

=== Other secular clergy who became bishops ===
- Paul Nguyễn Văn Hòa (priest here until 1968), appointed Bishop of Phan Thiết in 1975 and shortly after Bishop of Nha Trang (later President of the Conference of Catholic Bishops of Việt Nam)
- Paul Bùi Văn Đọc, appointed Bishop of Mỹ Tho in 1999, later Coadjutor Archbishop of Hồ Chi Minh City, and subsequently succeeded as well as President of the Conference of Catholic Bishops of Việt Nam
- Joseph Võ Đức Minh, appointed Coadjutor Bishop of Nha Trang in 2005 and subsequently succeeded
- Joseph Nguyễn Đức Cường, appointed Bishop of Thanh Hóa in 2018

== See also ==
- List of Catholic dioceses in Vietnam

== Sources and external links ==
- GCatholic with Google satellite photo - data for all sections
- General Information on the diocese
