= John Baptist Nguyễn Quang Tuyến =

Vietnamese Catholic prelate (born 1969)

His Excellency, The Most Reverend John Baptist Nguyễn Quang Tuyến
- Auxiliary Bishop of Hồ Chí Minh City
- Native name: Gioan Baotixita Nguyễn Quang Tuyến
- Archdiocese: Hồ Chí Minh City
- Province: Sài Gòn
- Appointed: 11 April 2026
- Other post: Titular Bishop of Perdices
- Previous post: Dean, Chí Hòa Deanery of the Archdiocese of Hồ Chí Minh City (2022–2026)

Orders
- Ordination: 28 June 2003 by Jean-Baptiste Phạm Minh Mẫn
- Consecration: 23 June 2026 by Joseph Nguyễn Năng, Louis Nguyễn Anh Tuấn, and Aloysius Nguyễn Hùng Vị

Personal details
- Born: Nguyễn Quang Tuyến; 26 May 1969 (age 57) Sài Gòn, Republic of Việt Nam
- Denomination: Catholic
- Education: Saint Joseph Major Seminary of Sài Gòn
- Motto: Spiritui oboedite (Note: Inspired from 1 Thessalonians 5:19); (Obey the Spirit); (Hãy vâng nghe Thần Khí)
- Styles
- Spoken style: Your Excellency
- Religious style: Bishop

John Baptist Nguyễn Quang Tuyến (born 26 May 1969) is a Vietnamese Catholic prelate who serves as an auxiliary bishop of Hồ Chí Minh City. He was ordained as a priest in 2003 and served as the dean of the Chí Hòa deanery of the archdiocese from 2022 to 2026.

== Biography ==
=== Early life ===
Nguyễn Quang Tuyến was born on 26 May 1969 in the city of Sài Gòn in what was then the Republic of Việt Nam. His father was Joseph Nguyễn Văn Khiêm, was a native of Phú Gia village of Hà Nội before moving to Sài Gòn. His parents had 7 children, with 3 boys and 4 girls. Tuyến's oldest brother is also a priest, Anthony Nguyễn Anh Dũng, who served as chaplain to the foyer of charity of Cao Thái Parish. His sisters, Monica Nguyễn Thị Anh Thư and Cecilia Nguyễn Thị Bạch Mai, are religious sisters of the Daughters of Mary Help of Christians. During his childhood, he participated in the Vietnamese Eucharistic Youth Movement (Vietnamese: Phong trào Thiếu nhi Thánh Thể Việt Nam) and eventually became a youth leader during his teenage years.

Between 1992 and 1997, he assisted the pastor at Phú Bình Parish in liturgical rites and headed the altar servers. He also led their youth choir. In October 1997, Tuyến officially joined the seminary's fifth class. He was ordained a deacon by Archbishop Jean-Baptiste Phạm Minh Mẫn in 2003.

=== Priesthood ===
On 28 June 2003, Tuyến was ordained a priest for the Archdiocese of Hồ Chí Minh City by Mẫn at the Notre-Dame Cathedral Basilica of Sài Gòn. From August 2003 to August 2005, Tuyến was assigned as a parochial vicar for the Tân Chí Linh Parish in the Chí Hòa deanery of the archdiocese. In August 2007, he was reassigned to the Fatima Bình Triệu Parish in the Thủ Đức deanery. From August 2007 to August 2010, he assisted at the Archdiocesan Pastoral Center.

During his assignment at the pastoral center between 2008 and 2009, Tuyến attended the Pastoral Renewal Program at the Pastoral Institute of East Asia in the Philippines. In 2011, he was sent to the United States to study pastoral theology and pastoral service in Maryland while assisting at Our Lady of Vietnam Parish in Silver Spring until 2017. After returning to Vietnam in late 2017, he became the spiritual director of the Emmanuel Community in Vietnam and assigned as the pastor of the Nam Thái Parish. He officially assumed the role of pastor in January 2018. In 2021, he was given the additional responsibility of spiritual director of the Cursillo Movement in the archdiocese. He became the head of the Office of the Ministry for Marriage and Family in 2022, after serving in the ministry since his return to Vietnam and working with the previous head, Bishop Louis Nguyễn Anh Tuấn. Tuyến was also made the dean of the Chí Hòa deanery that year.

=== Episcopate ===
==== Auxiliary Bishop of Hồ Chí Minh City ====
Tuyến was appointed as Auxiliary Bishop of Hồ Chí Minh City on 11 April 2026. His appointment was announced with the appointment of the Coadjutor Bishop of Qui Nhơn, John Baptist Nguyễn Quốc Hưng. He was consecrated as a bishop on 23 June 2026 at the Archdiocesan Pastoral Center by Joseph Nguyễn Năng, Louis Nguyễn Anh Tuấn, and Aloysius Nguyễn Hùng Vị.
