= Diocese of Phan Thiết =

Roman Catholic diocese in Vietnam

Coordinates: 10.9220°N 108.0949°E

Diocese of Phan Thiết Dioecesis Phanthietensis Giáo phận Phan Thiết
- Coat of arms of Bishop Joseph Đỗ Mạnh Hùng

Location
- Country: Vietnam
- Ecclesiastical province: Saigon
- Metropolitan: Saigon

Statistics
- Area: 7,854 km^{2} (3,032 sq mi)
- Population: Total; Catholics: (as of 2004); 1,106,012; 147,000 (13.3%)

Information
- Denomination: Roman Catholic
- Sui iuris church: Latin Church
- Rite: Roman Rite
- Established: 30 January 1975
- Cathedral: Cathedral of the Sacred Heart in Phan Thiết
- Patron saint: Mary, Mother of God

Current leadership
- Pope: Leo XIV
- Bishop: Joseph Đỗ Mạnh Hùng
- Metropolitan Archbishop: Joseph Nguyễn Năng

Website
- Website of the Diocese

The Diocese of Phan Thiết (Latin: Dioecesis Phanthietensis) is a Roman Catholic diocese of Vietnam. On 25 July 2009, Pope Benedict XVI selected Monsignor Joseph Vũ Duy Thống as bishop, who served until his death in 2017. The creation of the diocese in present form was declared 30 January 1975. The diocese covers an area of 7,854 km², and is a suffragan diocese of the Archdiocese of Saigon.

By 2004, the diocese of Phan Thiêt had about 147,000 believers (13.3% of the population), 80 priests and 64 parishes. Sacred Heart Cathedral (formerly Lạc Đạo Cathedral) in Phan Thiết city (Bình Thuận Province) has been assigned as the Cathedral of the diocese. There are 238 sisters from Lovers of the Holy Cross congregation doing active social and missionary work within the Diocese.
