= Peter Nguyen =

Peter Nguyen may refer to:

- Peter Nguyen (judge) (1943–2020), the first Director of Public Prosecution of Asian descent in Hong Kong history
- Peter Nguyen Van Hung (born 1958), Vietnamese Australian Roman Catholic priest and human rights activist

== See also ==
- Pierre Nguyen (disambiguation)
