= Diocese of Cần Thơ =

Catholic diocese in Southern Vietnam

Coordinates: 10.0271°N 105.7848°E

Diocese of Cần Thơ Dioecesis Canthoensis Giáo phận Cần Thơ

Catholic
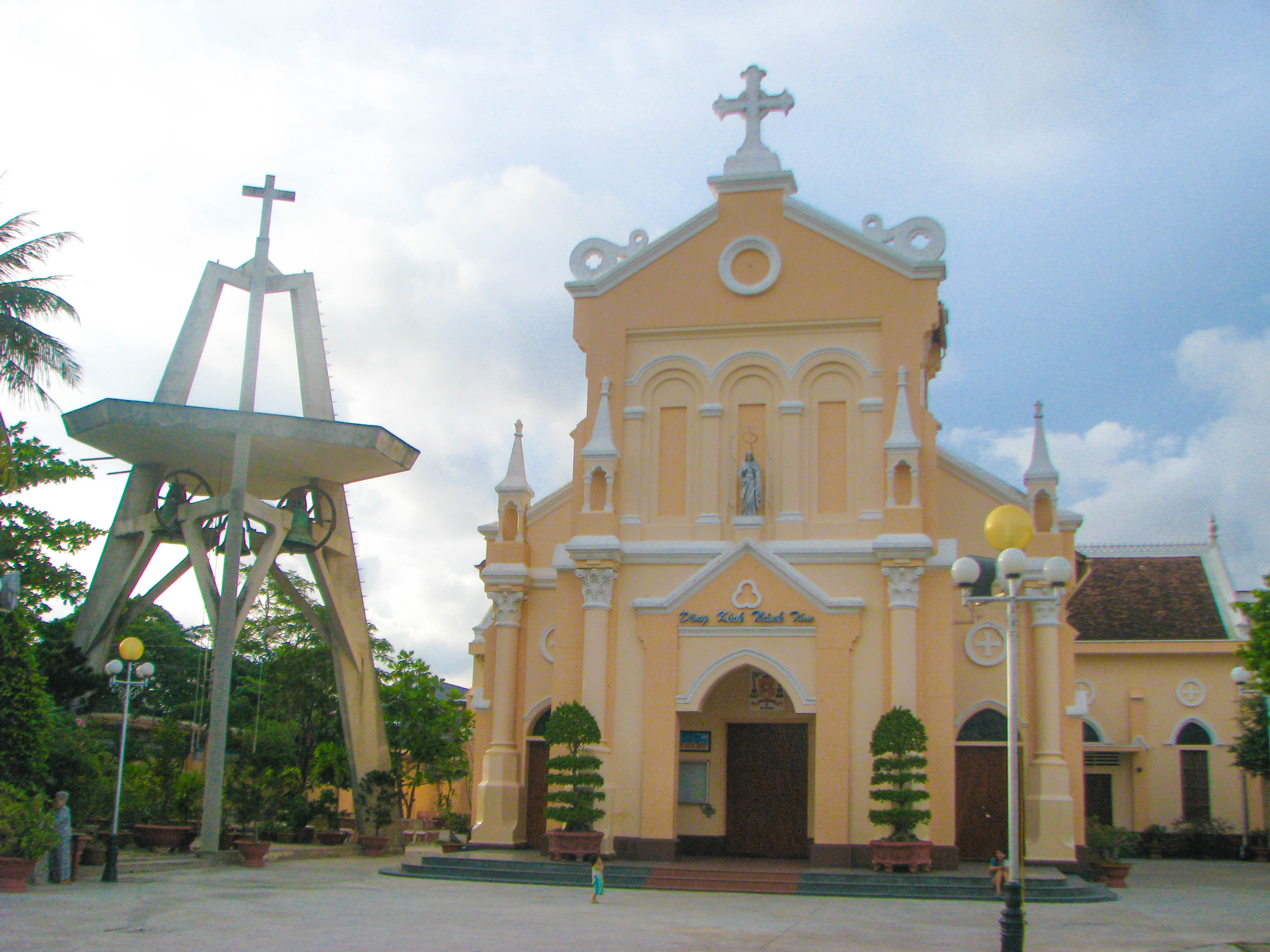
- Cần Thơ Cathedral

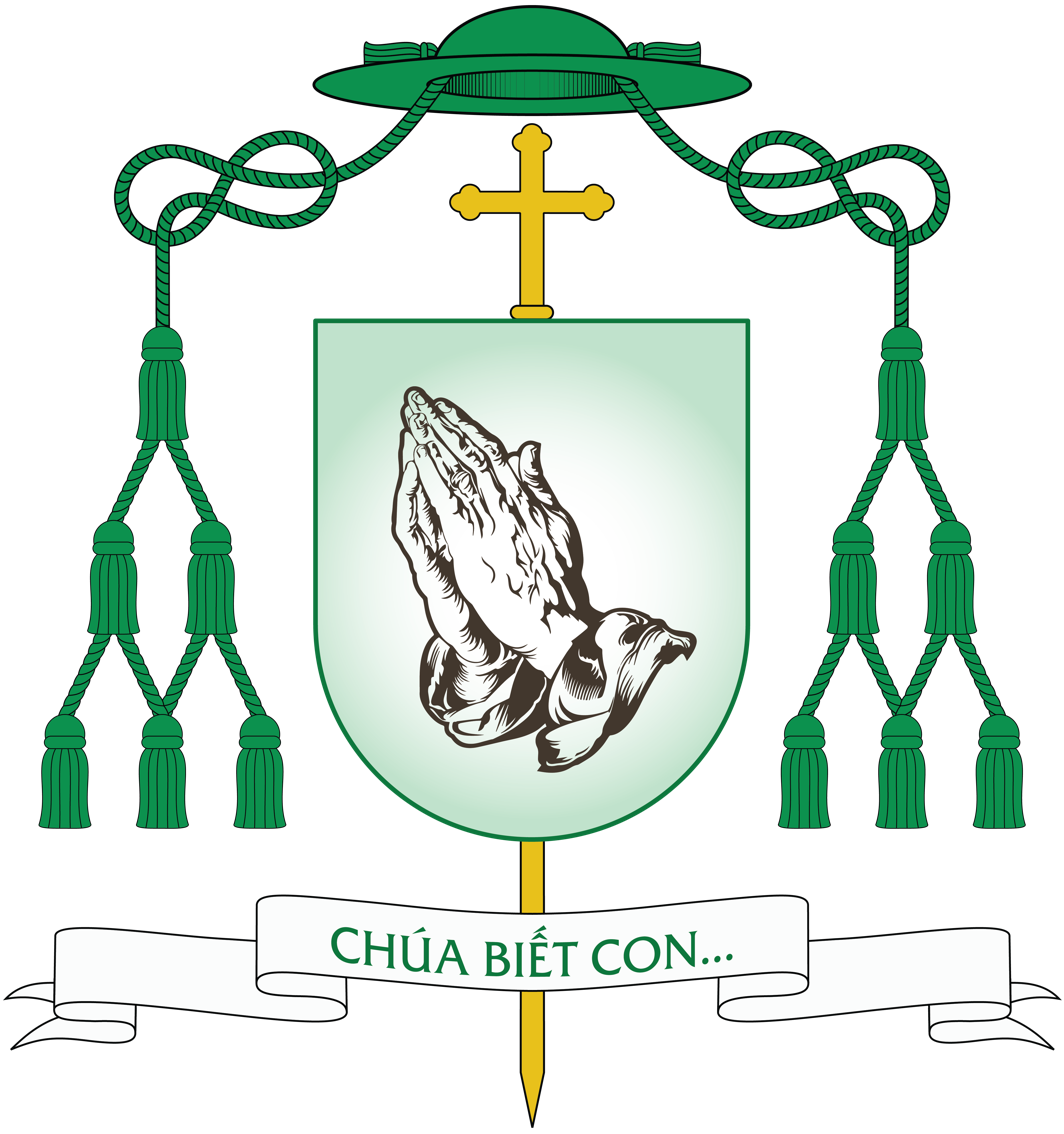
- Coat of arms of Bishop Peter Lê Tấn Lợi

Location
- Country: Vietnam
- Ecclesiastical province: Sài Gòn

Statistics
- Area: 12,214 km^{2} (4,716 sq mi)
- Population: Total; Catholics: (as of 2022); 5,308,914; 190,549 (3.6%)
- Parishes: 150

Information
- Denomination: Roman Catholic
- Sui iuris church: Latin Church
- Rite: Roman Rite
- Cathedral: Cathedral of the Sacred Heart of Jesus
- Patron saint: Sacred Heart
- Secular priests: 249 (18 religious priests)

Current leadership
- Pope: Leo XIV
- Bishop: Peter Lê Tấn Lợi
- Metropolitan Archbishop: Joseph Nguyễn Năng
- Bishops emeritus: Stephanus Tri Bửu Thiên

Map
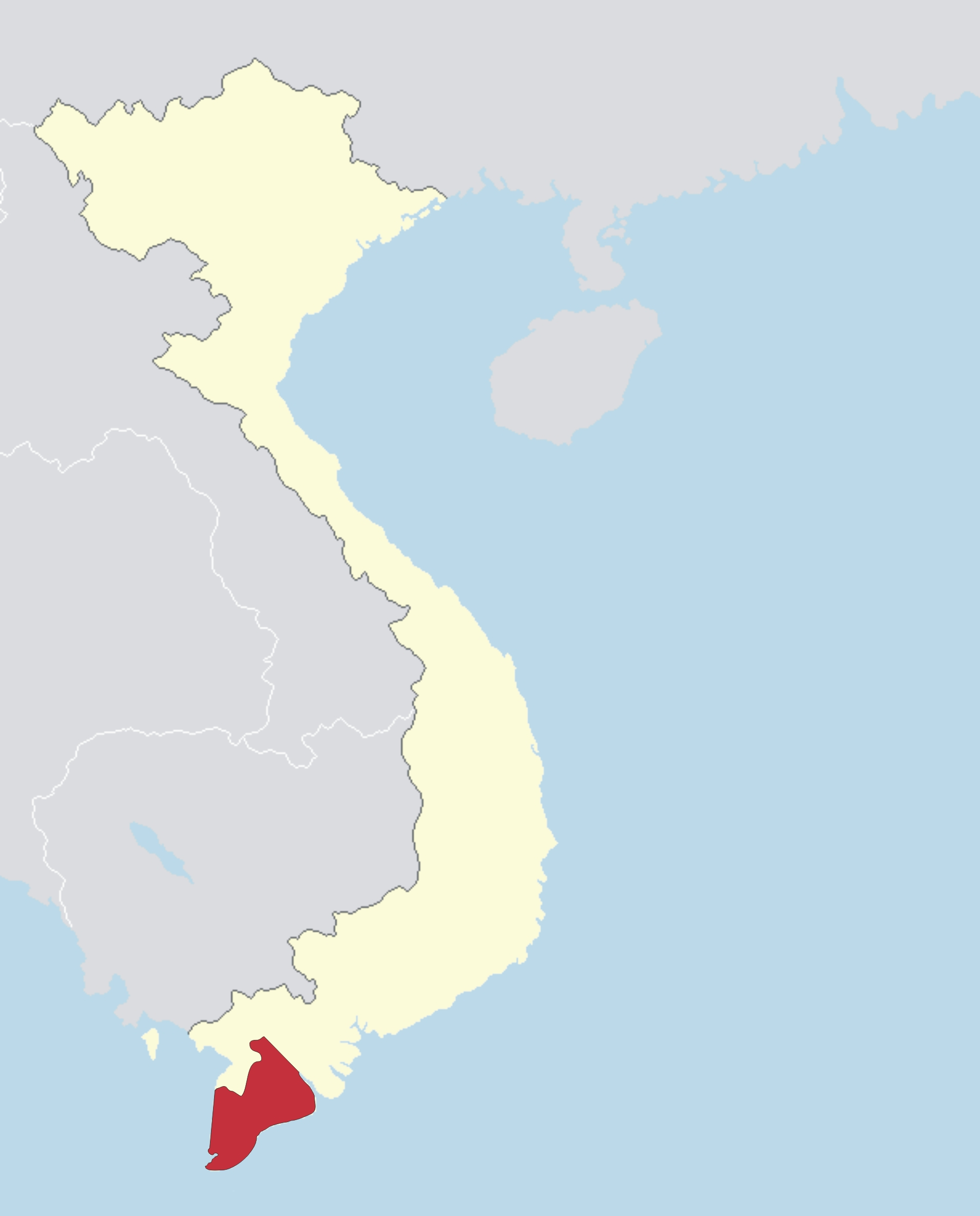

Website
- Website of the Diocese

The diocese of Cần Thơ (Latin: Dioecesis Canthoënsis) is a Roman Catholic diocese of Vietnam.

The creation of the diocese in present form was declared November 24, 1960.

The diocese covers an area of 13,257 km^{2} (5,119 sq mi), and is a suffragan diocese of the Archdiocese of Ho Chi Minh city.

By 2004, the diocese of Cần Thơ had about 176,424 believers (3% of the population), 153 priests and 131 parishes.

Sacred Heart Cathedral in Cần Thơ has been assigned as the Cathedral of the diocese.

== Bishops ==
Ordinaries		Coat of Arms	Period in office	Status	Reference
Vicars Apostolic of Cần Thơ
1	Bishop Paul Nguyễn Văn Bình		September 20, 1955 – November 24, 1960	Later Archbishop of Saigon	
Bishops of Cần Thơ
1	Bishop Philippe Nguyễn Kim Ðiền, P.F.J.		November 24, 1960 – September 30, 1964	Later Coadjutor Archbishop of Hue	
2	Bishop Jacques Nguyễn Ngọc Quang		March 22, 1965 – June 20, 1990	Died in office	
3	Bishop Emmanuel Lê Phong Thuận		June 20, 1990 – October 17, 2010	Died in office	
4	Bishop Stephanus Tri Bửu Thiên		October 17, 2010 – January 1, 2025	Retired	

=== Coadjutor Bishops ===
- Jacques Nguyễn Ngọc Quang (22 March 1965 - 11 March 1968)
- Emmanuel Lê Phong Thuận (6 June 1975 - 20 June 1990)
- Stephanus Tri Bửu Thiên (26 November 2002 - 17 October 2010)
- Peter Lê Tấn Lợi (25 March 2023 - 1 January 2025)

=== Other secular clergy who became bishops ===
- Antoine Nguyễn Văn Thiện (incardinated here in 1955), appointed Bishop of Vĩnh Long in 1960
- Louis Hà Kim Danh (incardinated priest here, 1955–1965), appointed Coadjutor Bishop of Phú Cường in 1982 and later succeeded
- Jean-Baptiste Phạm Minh Mẫn, appointed Coadjutor Bishop of Mỹ Tho and later Archbishop of Hồ Chi Minh City (elevated to Cardinal in 2003)
- Antoine Vũ Huy Chương, appointed Bishop of Hưng Hóa in 2003 and later Bishop of Đà Lạt
