= Joseph Vũ Duy Thống =

Vietnamese Catholic prelate (1952–2017)

The Most Reverend, Catholic Musician Joseph Vũ Duy Thống
- Bishop of Phan Thiết
- Native name: Giuse Vũ Duy Thống
- Province: Sài Gòn
- Diocese: Phan Thiết
- Appointed: 25 July 2009
- Installed: 3 September 2009
- Term ended: 1 March 2017
- Predecessor: Paul Nguyễn Thanh Hoan
- Successor: Joseph Đỗ Mạnh Hùng
- Other post: Auxiliary Bishop of Hồ Chí Minh City & Titular Bishop of Tortibulum (2001–2009)

Orders
- Ordination: 26 October 1985
- Consecration: 17 August 2001 by Jean-Baptiste Phạm Minh Mẫn

Personal details
- Born: 2 July 1952 Thái Bình, Democratic Republic of Việt Nam
- Died: 1 March 2017 (aged 64) Ho Chi Minh City, Vietnam
- Buried: Cathedral of Phan Thiết
- Denomination: Catholic Church
- Motto: Caritas Christi urget nos; (The love of Christ compels us); (Tình yêu Chúa Kitô thúc bách tôi)
- Styles
- Reference style: His Excellency; The Most Reverend
- Spoken style: Your Excellency
- Religious style: Bishop

Joseph Vũ Duy Thống (2 July 1952 – 1 March 2017) was a Vietnamese Catholic prelate who served as the third Bishop of Phan Thiết from 2009 to his death in 2017. and the Head of the Episcopal Committee on Cultural Affairs. He was Auxiliary Bishop of the Roman Catholic Archdiocese of Ho Chi Minh City from 2001 to 2009.

== Biography ==
Vũ Duy Thống was born on 2 July 1952, in Thái Bình, North Vietnam. After moving to South Vietnam, he studied philosophy and theology at seminaries in the Diocese of Long Xuyên and the Archdiocese of Sài Gòn. He was ordained a priest on 26 October 1985, for the Archdiocese of Hồ Chí Minh City. He then furthered his studies at the Institut Catholique de Paris and obtained a master's degree in theology in 1998. Later, he became a professor at the Saint Joseph Major Seminary of Sài Gòn.

On 4 July 2001, he was appointed an Auxiliary Bishop of Hồ Chí Minh City. On August 17, 2001, he was ordained a bishop by Jean-Baptiste Phạm Minh Mẫn at the Saigon Notre-Dame Basilica.

On 25 July 2009, he was named the third Bishop of Phan Thiết, and was installed on 3 September 2009.

On 1 March 2017, Thống died after a few days in a coma.

Catholic Church titles
Preceded by Louis Phạm Văn Nẫm	Auxiliary Bishop of Ho Chi Minh City; 2001–2009	Succeeded by Pierre Nguyễn Văn Khảm
Preceded by Paul Nguyễn Thanh Hoan	Bishop of Phan Thiết; 2009–2017	Succeeded by Sede vacante
