= Emmanuel Lê Phong Thuận =

Vietnamese Roman Catholic bishop

- Bishop of Cần Thơ
- Church: Catholic Church
- Diocese: Diocese of Cần Thơ
- In office: 20 June 1990 – 17 October 2010
- Predecessor: James Nguyễn Ngọc Quang
- Successor: Stêphanô Tri Bửu Thiên
- Previous posts: Titular Bishop of Abthugni (1975-1990); Coadjutor Bishop of Cần Thơ (1975-1990)

Orders
- Ordination: 31 May 1960 by Paul Nguyễn Văn Bình
- Consecration: 6 June 1975 by James Nguyễn Ngọc Quang

Personal details
- Born: 2 December 1930 Mỹ Luông, An Giang, Colony of Cochinchina, Indochinese Union, French Empire
- Died: 17 October 2010 (aged 79)

Emmanuel Lê Phong Thuận (2 December 1930 – 17 October 2010) was the Roman Catholic bishop of the Diocese of Cần Thơ, Vietnam, from 20 June 1990, until his death on 17 October 2010.
