= Joseph Bùi Công Trác =

Vietnamese Catholic prelate (born 1965)

His Excellency, The Most Reverend Joseph Bùi Công Trác
- Auxiliary Bishop of Hồ Chí Minh City
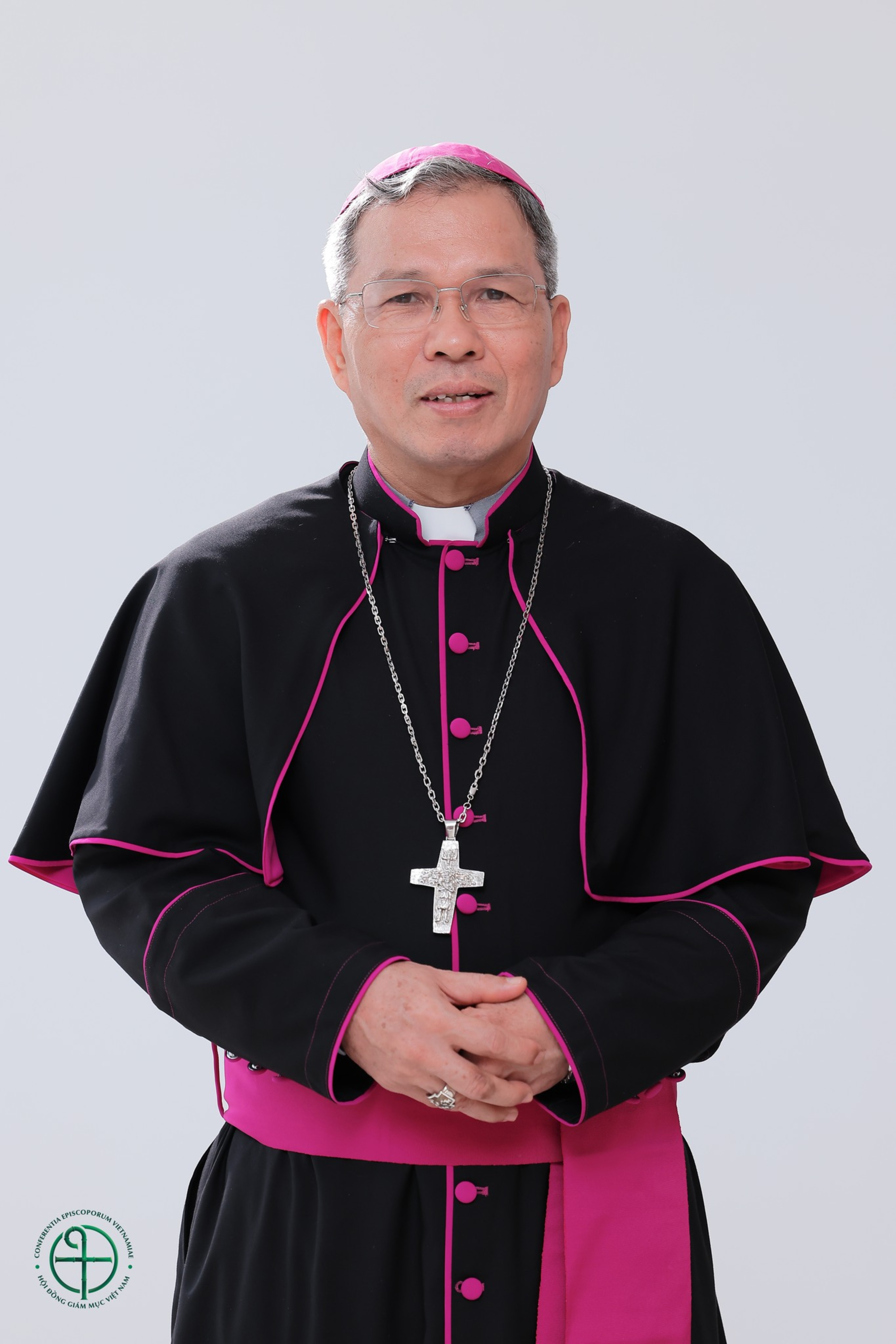
- Official portrait, 2024
- Native name: Giuse Bùi Công Trác
- Archdiocese: Hồ Chí Minh City
- Province: Sài Gòn
- Appointed: 1 November 2022
- Installed: 3 January 2023
- Other post: Titular Bishop of Arsennaria
- Previous posts: Rector, Saint Joseph Major Seminary of Sài Gòn (2016-2024)

Orders
- Ordination: 30 June 1999 by Jean-Baptiste Phạm Minh Mẫn
- Consecration: 3 January 2023 by Joseph Nguyễn Năng, Louis Nguyễn Anh Tuấn, and Matthieu Nguyễn Văn Khôi

Personal details
- Born: Bùi Công Tắc; 5 May 1965 (age 61) Đà Lạt, Republic of Việt Nam
- Education: Saint Joseph Major Seminary of Sài Gòn
- Alma mater: Pontifical Gregorian University
- Motto: Christus vivit (Christ is alive) (Chúa Kitô đang sống)
- Styles
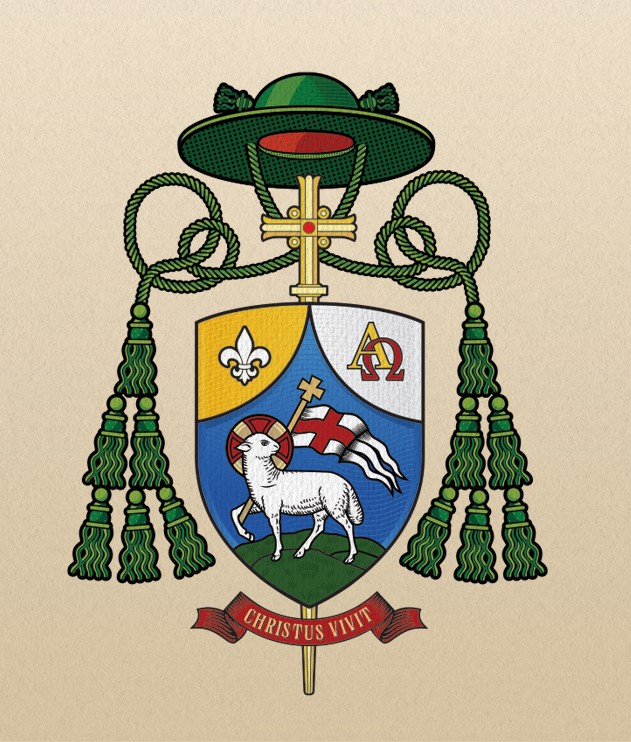
- Reference style: His Excellency; The Most Reverend
- Spoken style: Your Excellency
- Religious style: Bishop

Ordination history
History
Diaconal ordination
- Ordained by: Jean-Baptiste Phạm Minh Mẫn
Priestly ordination
- Ordained by: Jean-Baptiste Phạm Minh Mẫn
Episcopal consecration
- Principal consecrator: Joseph Nguyễn Năng
- Co-consecrators: Louis Nguyễn Anh Tuấn; Matthieu Nguyễn Văn Khôi

Joseph Bùi Công Trác (born 5 May 1965) is a Vietnamese Catholic prelate serving as an auxiliary bishop of Hồ Chí Minh City since 2023. He was ordained a priest in 1999 and was rector of Saint Joseph Major Seminary of Sài Gòn from 2016 to 2024.

== Biography ==
=== Early life ===
Bùi Công Tắc was born on 5 May 1965 in the city of Đà Lạt in what was then the Republic of Việt Nam. His parents, Joseph Bùi Văn Nhiếp and Teresa Quan Thị Nhân, were both natives of Hà Nội before moving to Đà Lạt. His father also previously served in the government of South Vietnam. He grew up near the Saint Nicholas Cathedral, but at the age of 10, his family moved to Sài Gòn, or what is now Hồ Chí Minh City. According to Trác, his father wanted to name his children after the children of the legendary family (Sơn-Hà-Xã-Tắc), but due to some unknown reason, his name was changed to Trác in the paperwork, along with his brother, who became Xá.

From October 1993 to July 1999, he entered Saint Joseph Major Seminary of Sài Gòn as a seminarian of the seminary's third class after it was reopened in 1986. This seminary class is considered a "golden class" because of their work in the committees of the Catholic Bishops' Conference of Vietnam, seminaries, religious orders, and episcopal sees. Trác was ordained a deacon on 19 March 1999 by Archbishop Jean-Baptiste Phạm Minh Mẫn.

=== Priesthood ===
On 30 June 1999, Trác, along with three other future bishops of his same seminary class, (Note: Pope Francis appointed the following three as bishops who were ordained on 30 June 1999 by Archbishop Jean-Baptiste Phạm Minh Mẫn: Louis Nguyễn Anh Tuấn in 2017; Joseph Đỗ Quang Khang in 2021; and Peter Kiều Công Tùng in 2023.) were ordained priests for the Archdiocese of Hồ Chí Minh City by Mẫn at the Notre-Dame Cathedral Basilica of Sài Gòn.

=== Episcopate ===
==== Auxiliary Bishop of Hồ Chí Minh City ====
He was appointed Auxiliary Bishop of Hồ Chí Minh City on All Saints' Day 2022. In an interview for the Bishops' Conference, Trác revealed that the appointment was to be on 29 October 2022 with Dominic Đặng Văn Cầu for the Diocese of Thái Bình, but was postponed due to a retreat that Archbishop Năng had to attend. He also noted in that interview that he has a "great devotion in praying for the souls in purgatory," and is thankful that his appointment was made during the month of All Souls.

He was ordained bishop on 3 January 2023 at the Archdiocesan Pastoral Center and consecrated by Archbishop Joseph Nguyễn Năng. His co-consecrators were Louis Nguyễn Anh Tuấn, Auxiliary Bishop of Hồ Chí Minh City as well as Apostolic Administrator of Hà Tĩnh and Matthieu Nguyễn Văn Khôi, Bishop of Qui Nhơn.
