= Archdiocese of Ho Chi Minh City =

Roman Catholic archdiocese in Vietnam

Metropolitan Archdiocese of Ho Chi Minh City (Saigon) Archidioecesis Metropolitanae Hochiminhopolitana (-Saigonensis) Tổng Giáo phận Sài Gòn (Thành Phố Hồ Chí Minh) Archidiocèse Métropolitain d'Sài Gòn (Hô-Chi-Minh-Ville)
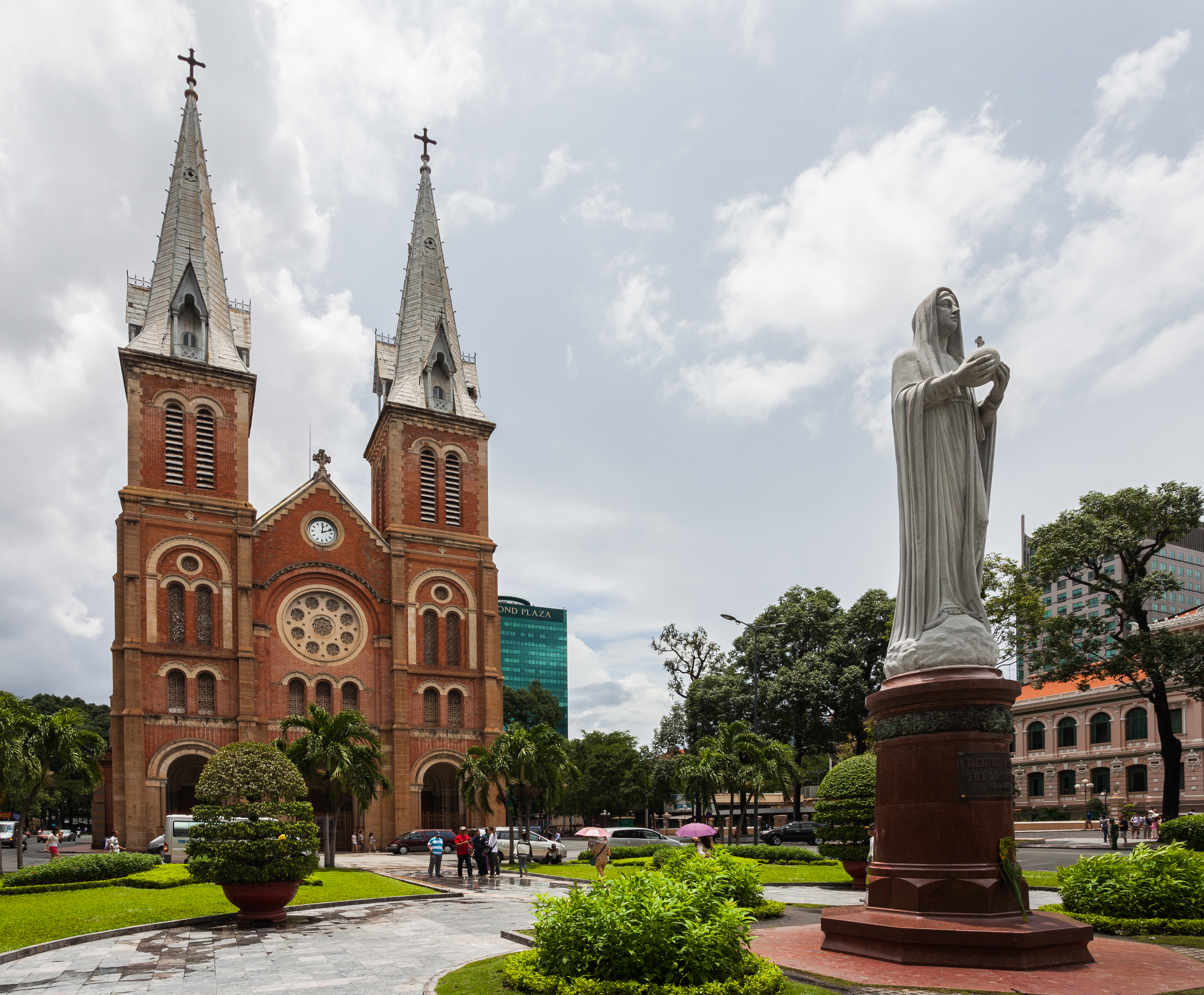
- Notre-Dame Cathedral Basilica of Sài Gòn

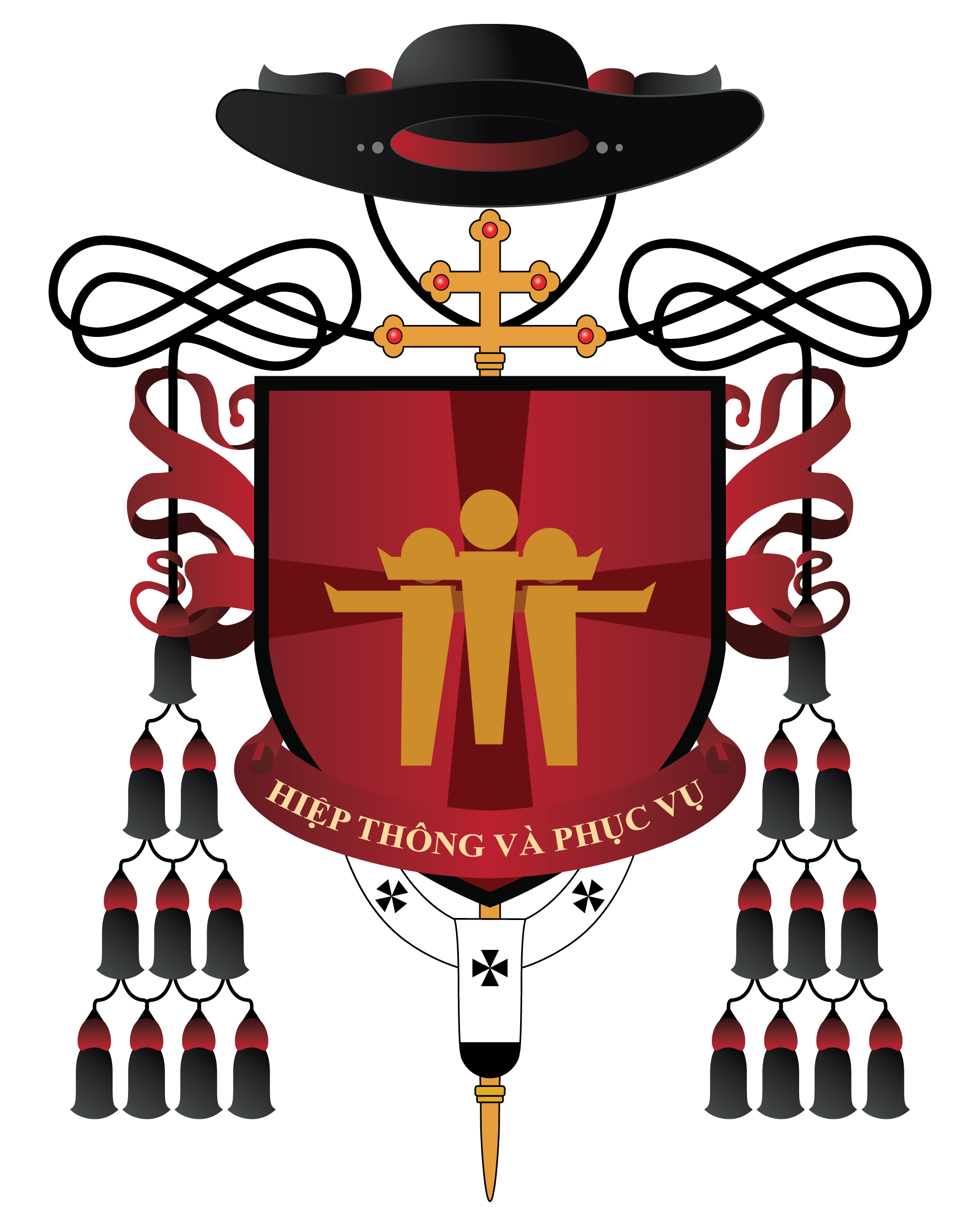
- Coat of arms of Archbishop Năng

Location
- Country: Vietnam
- Ecclesiastical province: Saigon
- Metropolitan: Southwest Ho Chi Minh City
- Deaneries: 14
- Coordinates: 10.7799°N 106.6990°E

Statistics
- Area: 2,093 km^{2} (808 sq mi)
- Population: Total; Catholics: (as of 2022); 8,465,401; 722,098 (8.5%)
- Parishes: 203

Information
- Denomination: Catholic Church
- Sui iuris church: Latin Church
- Rite: Roman Rite
- Cathedral: Cathedral Basilica of Our Lady of the Immaculate Conception
- Patron saint: Our Lady of the Immaculate Conception
- Secular priests: 379

Current leadership
- Pope: Leo XIV
- Metropolitan Archbishop: Joseph Nguyễn Năng
- Suffragans: Diocese of Bà Rịa; Diocese of Cần Thơ; Diocese of Đà Lạt; Diocese of Long Xuyên; Diocese of Mỹ Tho; Diocese of Phan Thiết; Diocese of Phú Cường; Diocese of Vĩnh Long; Diocese of Xuân Lộc
- Auxiliary Bishops: Joseph Bùi Công Trác; John Baptist Nguyễn Quang Tuyến

Map

Website
- tgpsaigon.net

Archdiocese of Ho Chi Minh City (Vietnamese: Tổng giáo phận Thành phố Hồ Chí Minh, Latin: Archidioecesis Hochiminhopolitana) also known as Archdiocese of Saigon (Tổng giáo phận Sài Gòn) is a Catholic ecclesiastical territory in the south of Vietnam. By far the largest diocese in the country by population and second in the number of Catholics, yet like most big cities, it covers a relatively small area of 2,390 km^{2} (920 sq mi).

The Cathedral Basilica of the Immaculate Conception (Vương cung thánh đường Chính tòa Đức Mẹ Vô nhiễm Nguyên tội) in Ho Chi Minh City has been assigned as the cathedral of the archdiocese. There are also popular and historic churches such as Saint Francis Xavier Church, Saint Jeanne d'Arc Church, Saint Joseph Church, Sacred Heart Church, Saint Philip Church, and Tân Định Church.

By 2004, the archdiocese had about 602,478 believers (11.0% of the population), 519 priests and 195 parishes.

The archdiocese is a "sister" diocese of the Archdiocese of Los Angeles (United States) since 2008.

The archdiocese ministers often take part in international exchanges and contacts, though with special permission of the Vietnamese authorities.

The young Catholics from the Archdiocese of Ho Chi Minh City and Archdiocese of Hanoi formed in 2006 an organization for helping children in rural and underdeveloped areas of Vietnam. The Metropolitan Archdiocese of Ho Chi Minh City regularly organizes special mass events including the Youth Day in December 2007, which was attended by more than 7 000 young people, who take part in volunteer and charitable activities, and two prayer vigils "God is rich in compassion" in March 2008 with the participation of several thousand faithful.

There is a center of social work organized by the Metropolitan Archdiocese of Ho Chi Minh City, which consists of priests, laypeople, and members of civil groups. The center is occupied with three main problems: helping street children, activities to reduce HIV/AIDS level, helping its victims, and social and psychological work with prostitutes to get them off the streets.

The ecclesiastical province of Sài Gòn contains the following suffragan dioceses in south Vietnam:

- Diocese of Bà Rịa
- Diocese of Cần Thơ
- Diocese of Đà Lạt
- Diocese of Long Xuyên
- Diocese of Mỹ Tho
- Diocese of Phan Thiết
- Diocese of Phú Cường
- Diocese of Vĩnh Long
- Diocese of Xuân Lộc

== Name ==
Since its establishment in 1844, this archdiocese has gone through various names: Vicariate Apostolic of West Tonkin (1844–1924), Vicariate Apostolic of Saigon (1924–1960), and then the Archdiocese of Saigon (from 1960). Nowadays, this archdiocese is called the Archdiocese of Ho Chi Minh City, after the administrative name of the city, and in its communications, the Vatican uses this name.

In reality, the name Archdiocese of Saigon is still used in the documents of the Catholic Church in Vietnam. Additionally, sometimes the name used is the Archdiocese of Saigon – Ho Chi Minh City.

== Cathedral ==
The Notre-Dame Cathedral Basilica of Sài Gòn (Vương cung thánh đường Chính tòa Đức Mẹ Vô nhiễm Nguyên tội, or more commonly Nhà thờ Đức Bà Sài Gòn) in Ho Chi Minh City is considered to be one of the main city attractions and one of the most beautiful buildings in all of Vietnam. It was built from 1877 to 1880 by the French architect J. Bourad, has a Neo-Romanesque façade with twin towers and a statue of the Virgin Mary in the center front.

== Bishops ==
=== Vicars Apostolic of Western Cochin ===
Ordinaries		Period in office	Status	Coadjutor Vicar Apostolic		Reference
1	Bishop Dominique Lefèbvre, M.E.P.	March 02, 1844 – August 28, 1864	Retired	Bishop Jean-Claude Miche, M.E.P.	March 11, 1844 – September 09, 1864	
2	Bishop Jean-Claude Miche, M.E.P.	September 09, 1864 – December 01, 1873	Died in office	Bishop Isidore-François-Joseph Colombert, M.E.P.	February 06, 1872 – December 01, 1872	
3	Bishop Isidore-François-Joseph Colombert, M.E.P.	December 01, 1873 – December 31, 1894	Died in office	Vacant		
4	Bishop Jean-Marie Dépierre, M.E.P.	April 12, 1895 – October 17, 1898	Died in office	Vacant		
5	Bishop Lucien-Emile Mossard, M.E.P.	February 11, 1899 – February 11, 1920	Died in office	Bishop Victor-Charles Quinton, M.E.P.	February 12, 1912 – February 11, 1920	
6	Bishop Victor-Charles Quinton, M.E.P.	February 11, 1920 – October 04, 1924	Died in office	Vacant		

=== Vicars Apostolic of Sài Gòn ===
Ordinaries		Period in office	Status	Reference
1	Bishop Isidore-Marie-Joseph Dumortier, M.E.P.	December 17, 1925 – February 16, 1940	Died in office	
2	Bishop Jean Cassaigne, M.E.P.	March 20, 1941 – September 20, 1955	Retired	
3	Bishop Simon Hoà Nguyễn Văn Hiền	September 20, 1955 – November 24, 1960	Transferred to Diocese of Đà Lat.	

=== Archbishops of Ho Chi Minh City ===
Archbishops		Coat of Arms	Period in office	Status	Reference
Metropolitan Archbishop of Saigon
1	Paul Nguyễn Văn Bình		November 24, 1960 – November 23, 1976	Title change with the change of the name of the archdiocese.	
Metropolitan Archbishops of Thành-Phô Hô Chí Minh
1	Paul Nguyễn Văn Bình		November 23, 1976 – July 01, 1995	Died in office	
–	Bishop Nicolas Huỳnh Văn Nghi		1993 – March 01, 1998	Apostolic Administrator	
2	Cardinal Jean-Baptiste Phạm Minh Mẫn		March 01, 1998 – March 22, 2014	Retired	
3	Paul Bùi Văn Đọc		March 22, 2014 – March 06, 2018	Died in Office	
4	Joseph Nguyễn Năng		October 19, 2019 – present	Current Archbishop	

=== Auxiliary Bishops ===
- François-Xavier Trần Thanh Khâm (1965.10.14 – 1976.10.02)
- Nicolas Huỳnh Văn Nghi (1974.07.01 – 1979.12.06), appointed Bishop of Phan Thiết
- Louis Phạm Văn Nẫm (1977.12.03 – 1999.09.30)
- Joseph Vũ Duy Thống (2001.07.04 – 2009.07.25), appointed Bishop of Phan Thiết
- Pierre Nguyễn Văn Khảm (2008.10.15 – 2014.07.26), appointed Bishop of Mỹ Tho
- Joseph Đỗ Mạnh Hùng (2016.06.25 – 2019.12.03), appointed Bishop of Phan Thiết
- Louis Nguyễn Anh Tuấn (2017.08.25 – 2023.03.25), appointed Bishop of Hà Tĩnh
- Joseph Bùi Công Trác (2022.11.01 – present)
- John Baptist Nguyễn Quang Tuyến (2026.04.11 – present)

=== Coadjutor Archbishops ===
- François Xavier Nguyễn Văn Thuận (1975.04.24 – 1994.11.24)
- Paul Bùi Văn Ðọc (2013.09.28 – 2014.03.22)

=== Other secular clergy who became bishops ===
- Jean-Baptiste Nguyễn Bá Tòng, appointed Vicar Apostolic of Phát Diệm and Titular Bishop of Sozopolis in Hæmimonto in 1933 (Apostolic Administrator there in 1944)
- Paul Nguyễn Văn Bình, appointed Vicar Apostolic of Cần Thơ and Titular Bishop of Agnusiensi in 1955 and later appointed Archbishop here in 1960
- Antoine Nguyễn Văn Thiện (priest here, 1932–1955), appointed Bishop of Vĩnh Long in 1960
- Joseph Trần Văn Thiện (priest here, 1935–1938), appointed Bishop of Mỹ Tho in 1960
- Philippe Nguyễn Kim Điền PFI (priest here, 1947–1956), appointed Bishop of Cần Thơ in 1960 and later Titular Archbishop of Parium and Apostolic Administrator of Huế (later Archbishop there in 1968)
- Michel Nguyễn Khắc Ngữ (incardinated in 1954), appointed Bishop of Long Xuyên in 1960
- Jacques Nguyễn Ngọc Quang (priest here, 1935–1938), appointed Coadjutor Bishop of Cần Thơ in 1965 and later succeeded
- Joseph Phạm Văn Thiên, appointed Bishop of Phú Cường in 1965
- Jacques Nguyễn Văn Mầu, appointed Bishop of Vĩnh Long in 1968
- Barthélémy Nguyễn Sơn Lâm PSS (priest here, 1957–1960), appointed Bishop of Đà Lạt in 1975 and later Bishop of Thanh Hóa
- Jean Baptiste Bùi Tuần (priest here, 1955–1960), appointed Coadjutor Bishop of Long Xuyên in 1975 and later succeeded
- André Nguyễn Văn Nam (priest here, 1952–1960), appointed Coadjutor Bishop of Mỹ Tho in 1975 and later succeeded
- Jacques Huỳnh Văn Của (priest here, 1941–1965), appointed Coadjutor Bishop of Phú Cường and Titular Bishop of Mizigi in 1976
- Louis Hà Kim Danh (priest here, 1940–1955), appointed Coadjutor Bishop of Phú Cường in 1982 and later succeeded
- Joseph Đinh Đức Đạo, appointed Auxiliary Bishop of Xuân Lộc and Titular Bishop of Gadiaufala in 2013 and later Coadjutor there (succeeded in 2016)
- Joseph Đỗ Quang Khang, appointed Coadjutor Bishop of Bắc Ninh in 2021 and later succeeded
- Peter Kiều Công Tùng, appointed Bishop of Phát Diệm in 2023

== See also ==
- Saigon Notre-Dame Basilica
- Roman Catholicism in Vietnam
- Tân Định Church
