= Paul Bùi Văn Đọc =

Vietnamese prelate

The Most Reverend Paul Bùi Văn Đọc
- Archbishop of Hồ Chí Minh City
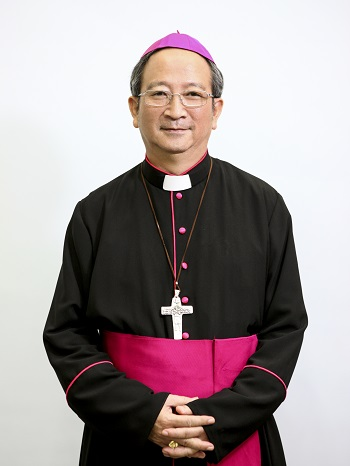
- Official portrait, 2014
- Native name: Phaolô Bùi Văn Đọc
- Province: Sài Gòn
- See: Hồ Chí Minh City
- Appointed: 28 September 2013 (as Coadjutor)
- Installed: 22 March 2014
- Term ended: 6 March 2018
- Predecessor: Jean-Baptiste Phạm Minh Mẫn
- Successor: Joseph Nguyễn Năng
- Previous posts: Apostolic Administrator of Mỹ Tho (2013–2014); Coadjutor Archbishop of Hồ Chí Minh City (2013–2014); President of the Catholic Bishops' Conference of Việt Nam (2013–2016); Bishop of Mỹ Tho (1999–2013)

Orders
- Ordination: 17 December 1970 by Simon Hòa Nguyễn Văn Hiền
- Consecration: 20 May 1999 by Jean-Baptiste Phạm Minh Mẫn

Personal details
- Born: 11 November 1944 Đà Lạt, French Indochina (now Đà Lạt, Vietnam)
- Died: 6 March 2018 (aged 73) Rome, Italy
- Buried: Chapel of the Archdiocesan Pastoral Center of Sài Gòn
- Denomination: Catholic
- Education: Pontifical Urban University
- Motto: Ad Deum lætitiæ meæ (God is my joy) (Chúa là nguồn vui của con)
- Styles
- Reference style: His Excellency; The Most Reverend
- Spoken style: Your Excellency
- Religious style: Archbishop

Ordination history
History
Priestly ordination
- Ordained by: Simon Hòa Nguyễn Văn Hiền
- Date: 17 December 1970
- Place: Diocese of Đà Lạt
Episcopal consecration
- Principal consecrator: Jean-Baptiste Phạm Minh Mẫn
- Co-consecrators: Barthélémy Nguyễn Sơn Lâm PSS; Pierre Nguyễn Văn Nhơn
- Date: 20 May 1999
- Place: Đà Lạt Cathedral
Episcopal succession
Bishops consecrated by Paul Bùi Văn Đọc as principal consecrator
- Peter Huỳnh Văn Hai: 11 December 2015
- Joseph Đỗ Mạnh Hùng: 4 August 2016
- Louis Nguyễn Anh Tuấn: 14 October 2017

Paul Bùi Văn Đọc (11 November 1944 – 6 March 2018) was a Vietnamese Catholic prelate who served as the third Archbishop of Hồ Chí Minh City from 2014 to 2018 and the President of the Catholic Bishops' Conference of Vietnam from 2013 to 2016. He previously served as the third Bishop of Mỹ Tho from 1999 to 2013 and was made coadjutor archbishop of Hồ Chí Minh City in 2013.

== Biography ==
Bùi Văn Đọc was born on 11 November 1944 in Da Lat, French Indochina. In 1956, he studied at Saint Joseph Seminary in Sài Gòn (now Hồ Chí Minh City). He then continued his studies in philosophy and theology at the Pontifical Urbaniana University in Rome, from 1964 to 1970. He was ordained a priest on 17 December 1970 in Da Lat and served as the Rector of Minh Hoa Major Seminary from 1975 until he became vicar general of the Diocese of Đà Lạt in 1995.

On 26 March 1999, he was appointed Bishop of My Tho by Pope John Paul II and was consecrated by Jean-Baptiste Phạm Minh Mẫn, Archbishop of Hồ Chí Minh City on 20 May of the same year.

He was named Coadjutor Archbishop of Hồ Chí Minh City on 28 September 2013 by Pope Francis. On 22 March 2014, he succeeded Cardinal Jean-Baptiste Phạm Minh Mẫn upon the latter's resignation.

He died on 6 March 2018 in Rome while participating in the ad limina visit of the conference of Vietnamese bishops. He was suspected of suffering a heart attack during a Mass at the Basilica of Saint Paul Outside the Walls and was rushed to the San Camillo Hospital, where he died.

== Gallery ==
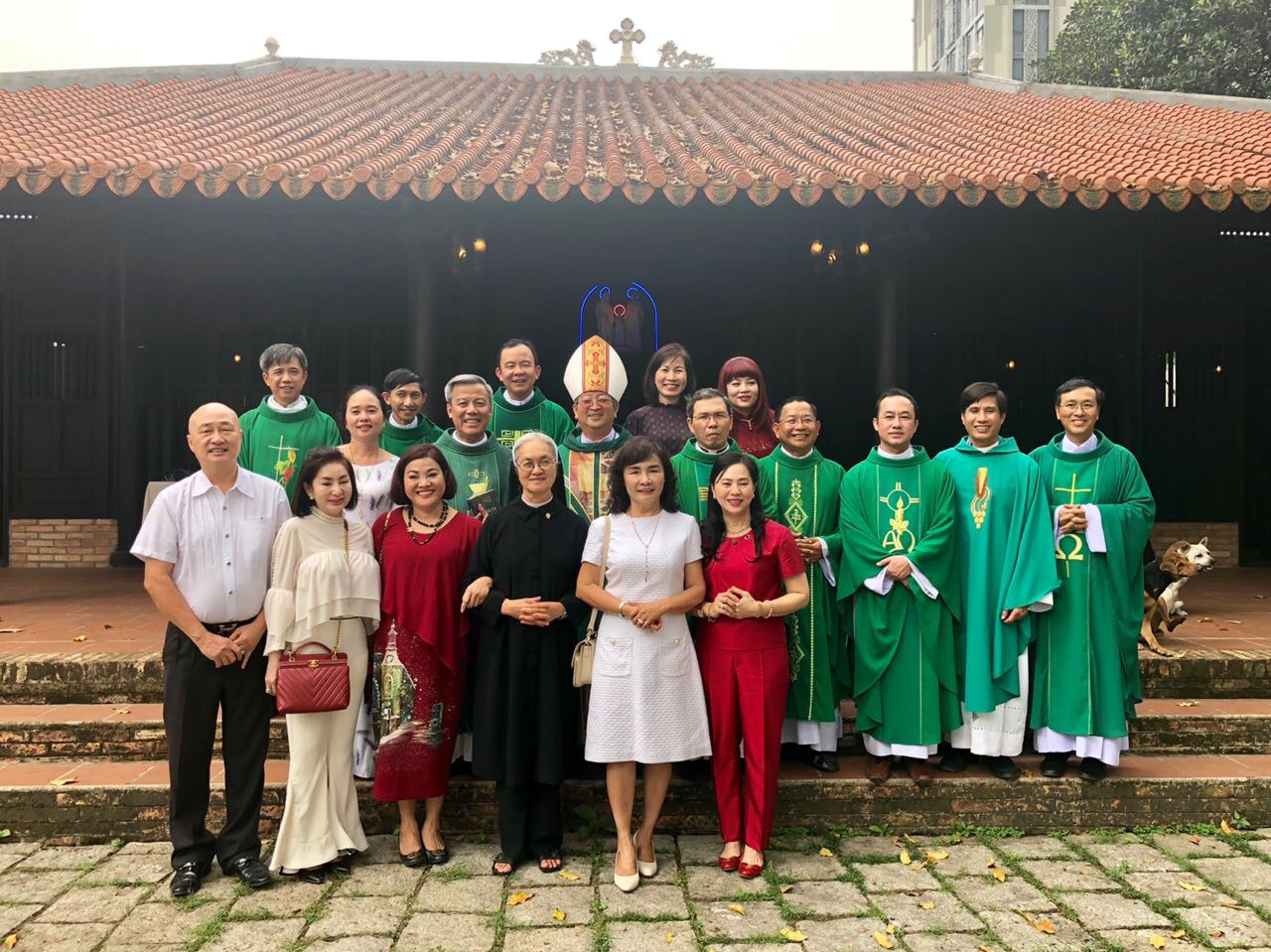
Spiritual family of Archbishop Paul Bùi Văn Đọc in reunion on 22 January 2018.

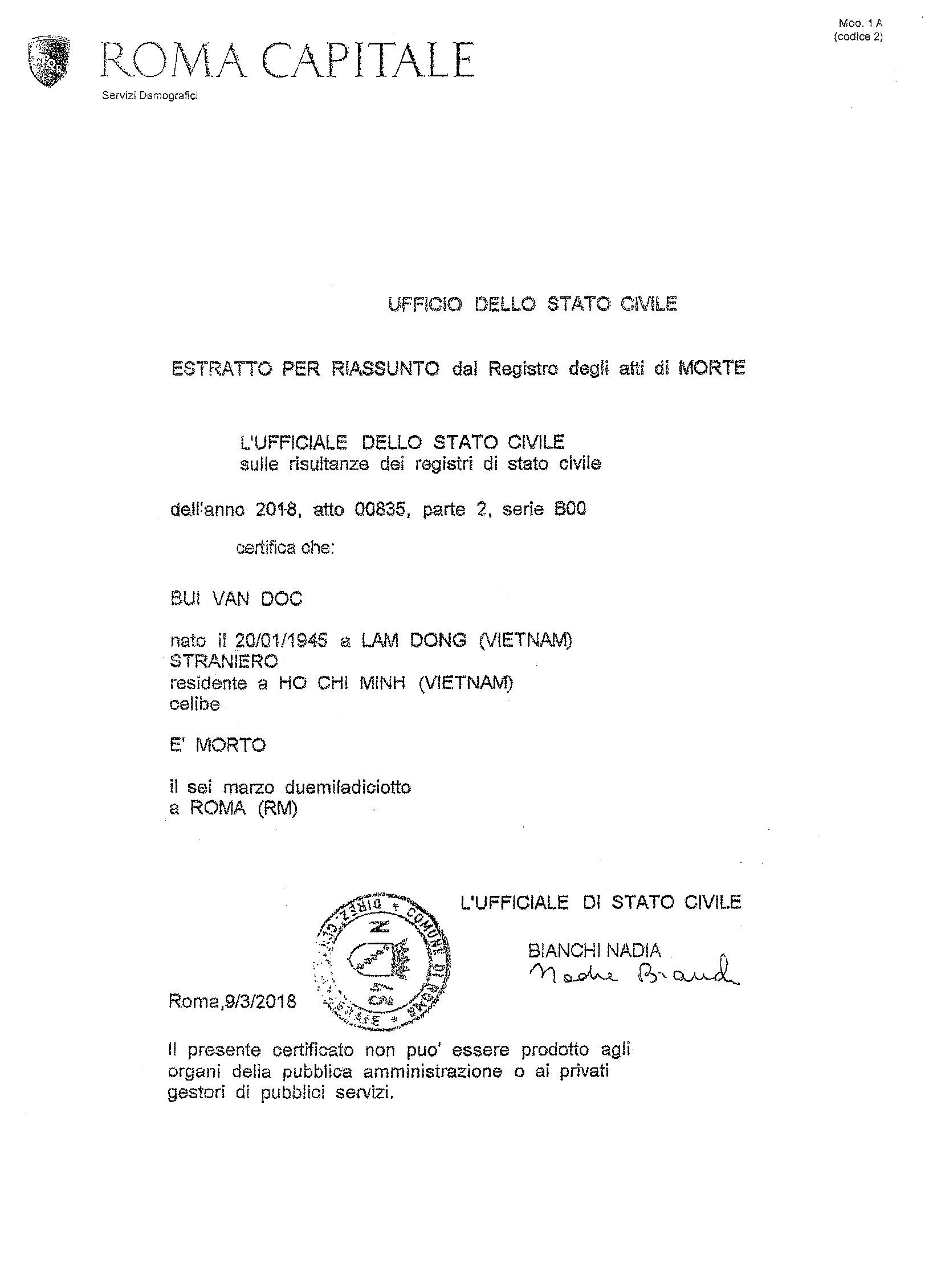
Extract of death certificate issued by the City of Rome's Civil Office on 9 March 2018.

== See also ==
- Catholic Church in Vietnam
