= James Nguyễn Ngọc Quang =

Vietnamese Roman Catholic bishop

Jacques Nguyễn Ngọc Quang
- Bishop of Cần Thơ
- Church: Catholic Church
- Diocese: Diocese of Cần Thơ
- In office: 22 March 1965 – 20 June 1990
- Predecessor: Philippe Nguyễn Kim Điền
- Successor: Emmanuel Lê Phong Thuận

Orders
- Ordination: 21 September 1935
- Consecration: 5 May 1965 by Angelo Palmas

Personal details
- Born: 23 July 1909
- Died: 20 June 1990 (aged 80)

Jacques Nguyễn Ngọc Quang (23 July 1909 − 20 June 1990) was a Vietnamese Roman Catholic bishop.

Ordained to the priesthood in 1935, Nguyễn Ngọc Quang was named bishop of the Roman Catholic Diocese of Cần Thơ, Vietnam and ordained to the episcopate on 5 May 1965. He died in 1990 while still in office.
