= Paul Nguyễn Văn Bình =

Vietnames Catholic archbishop (1910–1995)

His Excellency, The Most Reverend Paul Nguyễn Văn Bình
- Archbishop of Hồ Chi Minh City
- Native name: Phaolô Nguyễn Văn Bình
- Province: Hồ Chi Minh City
- See: Hồ Chi Minh City
- Appointed: 24 November 1960
- Installed: 2 April 1961
- Term ended: 1 July 1995
- Successor: Jean-Baptiste Phạm Minh Mẫn
- Previous post: Vicar Apostolic of Cần Thơ (1955-1960)

Orders
- Ordination: 27 March 1937
- Consecration: 30 November 1955 by Pierre-Martin Ngô Đình Thục

Personal details
- Born: September 1, 1910 Sài Gòn, French Indochina
- Died: July 1, 1995 (aged 84) Ho Chi Minh City, Việt Nam
- Buried: Saint Joseph Major Seminary of Sài Gòn
- Denomination: Roman Catholic
- Parents: Francis-Xavier Nguyễn Văn Trượng; Agnes Nguyễn Thị Luông
- Education: Minor Seminary, Saigon (1922 – 1932); Pontifical Urban University, Rome (1932 – 1937)
- Motto: Euntes docete (Hãy đi rao giảng) (Go and preach)
- Styles
- Reference style: His Excellency; The Most Reverend
- Spoken style: Your Excellency
- Religious style: Archbishop

Paul Nguyễn Văn Bình (September 1, 1910 – July 1, 1995) was a Vietnamese Catholic prelate who served as the first Archbishop of Sài Gòn – Hồ Chí Minh City from 1960 until his death in 1995.

== Biography ==
Nguyễn Văn Bình was born on September 1, 1910, in Saigon, Vietnam. In 1922, he started to study at Sai Gon minor seminary. He was sent to Rome in 1932 to further his studies by Bishop Isidore-Marie-Joseph Dumortier, who was Vicar Apostolic of Saigon. He was ordained a priest on March 27, 1937, at the Archbasilica of St. John Lateran in Rome. In 1943, he started teaching at the Saint Joseph Major Seminary in Saigon and was appointed as pastor of Cầu Đất parish in Da Lat in 1948.

On September 20, 1955, he was appointed as Vicar Apostolic of Cần Thơ by Pope Pius XII and was consecrated by Pierre-Martin Ngô Đình Thục, Vicar Apostolic of Vĩnh Long on November 30 of the same year at the Notre-Dame Cathedral Basilica of Saigon.

He was named the first Archbishop of Saigon on November 24, 1960, by Pope John XXIII.

On July 1, 1995, he died at the age of 84 and was buried at the Saint Joseph Major Seminary in Ho Chi Minh City.

== See also ==
- Catholic Church in Vietnam
