= Diocese of Mỹ Tho =

Roman Catholic diocese in Vietnam

Coordinates: 10.3614°N 106.3647°E

Diocese of Mỹ Tho Dioecesis Mythoensis Giáo phận Mỹ Tho
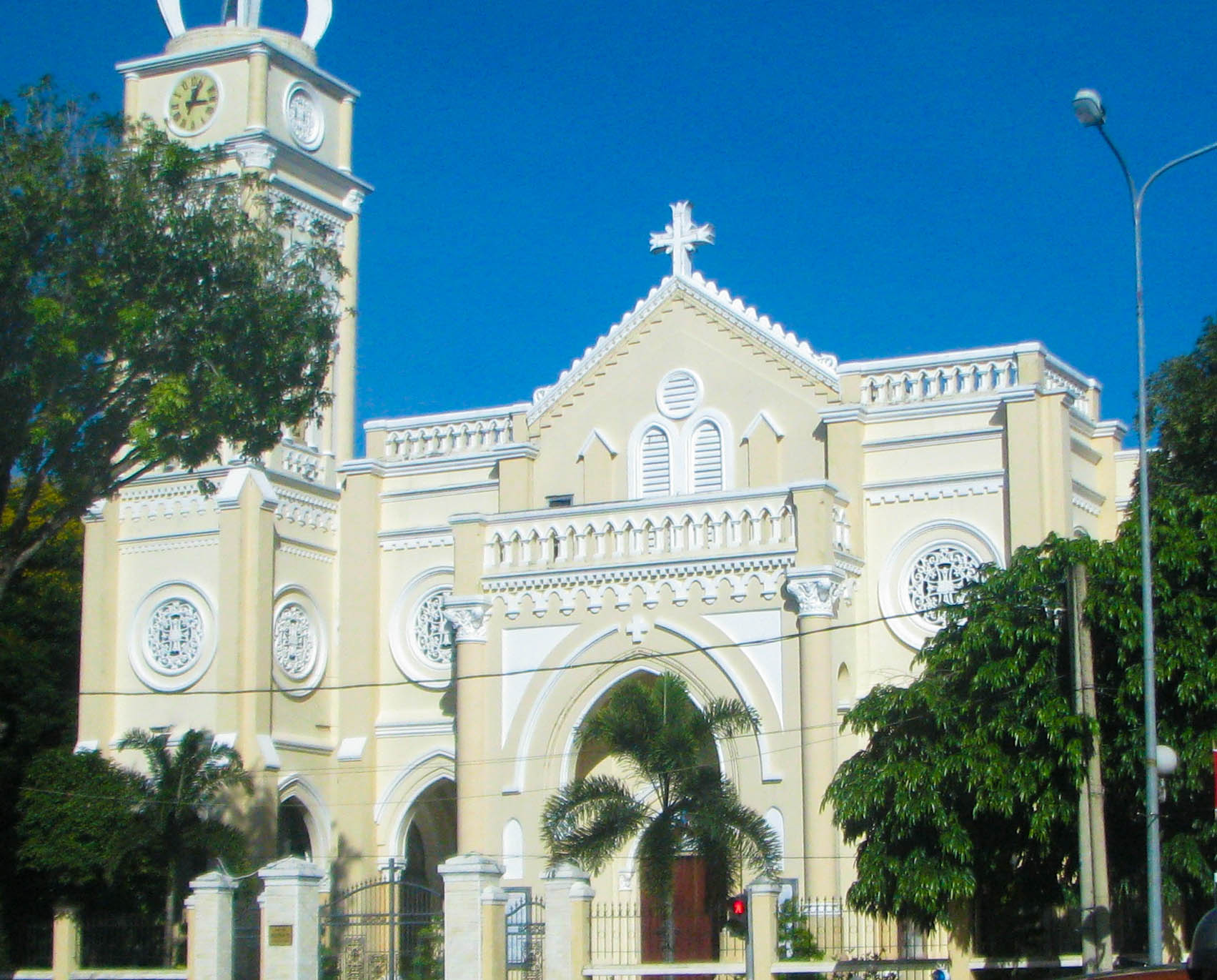
- Mỹ Tho Cathedral

- Coat of arms of Peter Nguyễn Văn Khảm

Location
- Country: Vietnam
- Ecclesiastical province: Ho Chi Minh
- Metropolitan: Ho Chi Minh
- Deaneries: Cái Bè; Cao Lãnh; Cù Lao Tây; Đức Hoà; Mỹ Tho; Tân An

Statistics
- Area: 9,262 km^{2} (3,576 sq mi)
- Population: Total; Catholics: (as of 2017); 4,194,184; 137,260 (3.3%)
- Parishes: 110

Information
- Denomination: Roman Catholic
- Sui iuris church: Latin Church
- Rite: Roman Rite
- Established: 24 November 1960
- Cathedral: Cathedral of the Immaculate Conception in Mỹ Tho
- Patron saint: Saint Peter Nguyễn Văn Lựu

Current leadership
- Pope: Leo XIV
- Bishop: Peter Nguyễn Văn Khảm
- Metropolitan Archbishop: Joseph Nguyễn Năng

Website
- giaophanmytho.net

The Roman Catholic Diocese of Mỹ Tho (Latin: Dioecesis Mythoënsis) is a Roman Catholic diocese in southern Vietnam. The current bishop is Peter Nguyễn Văn Khảm, former Auxiliary Bishop of the Archdiocese of Ho Chi Minh City. He was appointed by Pope Francis on July 26, 2014, and was installed a month later. His predecessor, Paul Bùi Văn Đọc, was named Coadjutor Archbishop and then Archbishop of the Archdiocese of Ho Chi Minh City, in September, 2013 and in March, 2014, respectively.

The creation of the diocese in its present form was declared on November 24, 1960.

The diocese covers an area of 9,262 km^{2} and is a suffragan diocese of the Roman Catholic Archdiocese of Ho Chi Minh City.

By 2021, the diocese of Mỹ Tho had about 138,102 Catholics (3.0% of the population), 148 priests and 113 parishes.

Immaculate Conception Cathedral in Mỹ Tho town has been assigned as the Cathedral of the diocese.

== Bishops ==
- Joseph Trần Văn Thiện (24 November 1960 - 24 February 1989)
- André Nguyễn Văn Nam (24 February 1989 - 26 March 1999)
- Paul Bùi Văn Đọc (26 March 1999 - 28 September 2013), appointed Coadjutor Archbishop of Ho Chi Minh City)
- Peter Nguyễn Văn Khảm (26 July 2014 – present)
