= Joseph Nguyễn Năng =

Vietnamese Catholic prelate (born 1953)

The Most Reverend Joseph Nguyễn Năng
- Archbishop of Hồ Chí Minh City; President of the Catholic Bishops'; Conference of Việt Nam
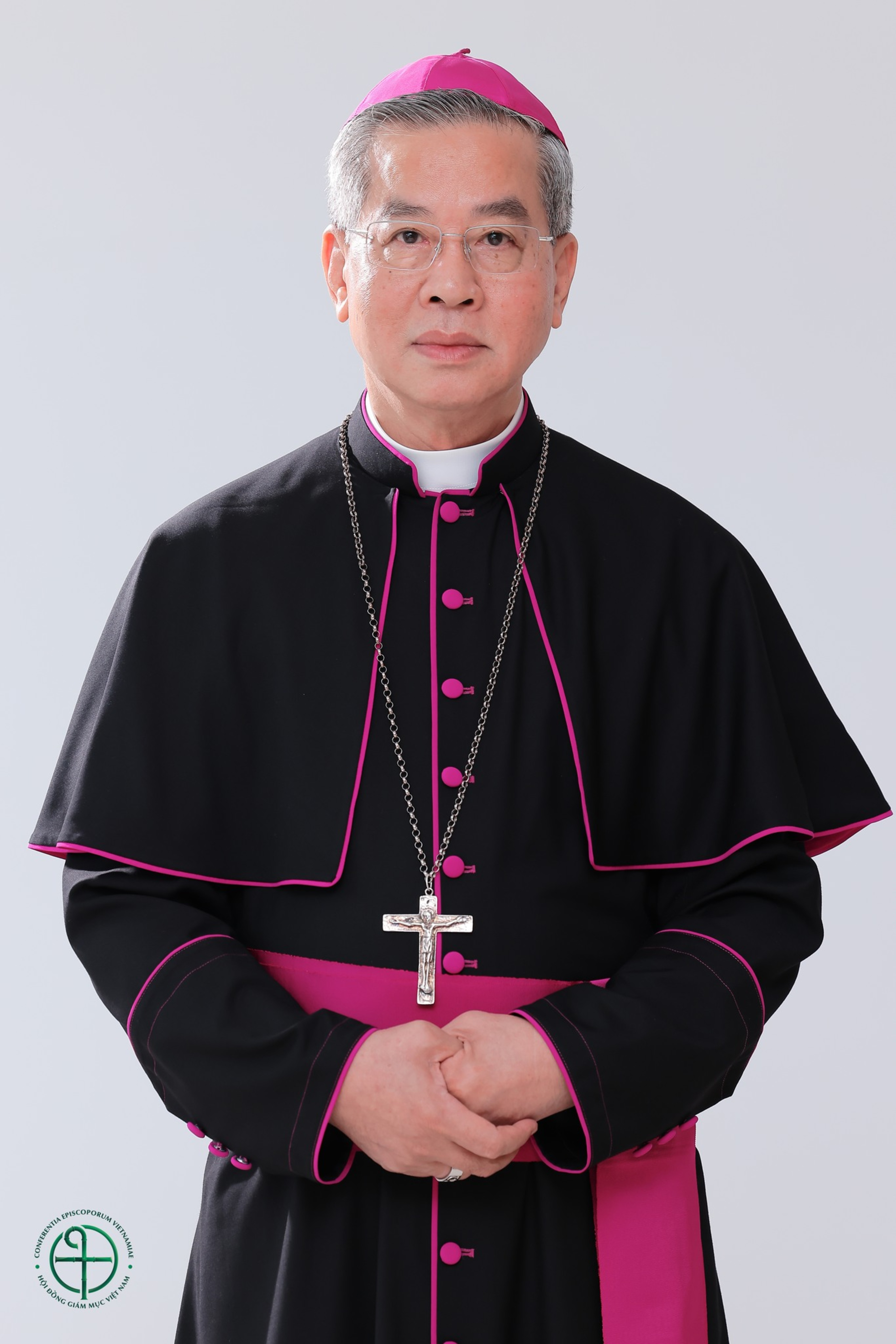
- Official portrait, 2024
- Native name: Giuse Nguyễn Năng
- Archdiocese: Hồ Chí Minh City
- Province: Sài Gòn
- Appointed: 19 October 2019
- Installed: 11 December 2019
- Predecessor: Paul Bùi Văn Đọc
- Previous posts: Apostolic Administrator of Phát Diệm (2019-2023); Vice President, CBCV (2016-2022); President, Committee on the Doctrine of the Faith of the CBCV (2013–2016); Bishop of Phát Diệm (2009–2019)

Orders
- Ordination: 9 June 1990 by Paul-Marie Nguyễn Minh Nhật
- Consecration: 8 September 2009 by Dominique Nguyễn Chu Trinh, Joseph Nguyễn Chí Linh, Joseph Nguyễn Văn Yến

Personal details
- Born: 24 November 1953 (age 72) Phúc Nhạc, Ninh Bình, Democratic Republic of Việt Nam
- Education: Pontifical College of Saint Pius X of Đà Lạt; Pontifical Urban University
- Motto: Communione et Serviente; (Communion and Service); (Hiệp thông và Phục vụ)
- Styles
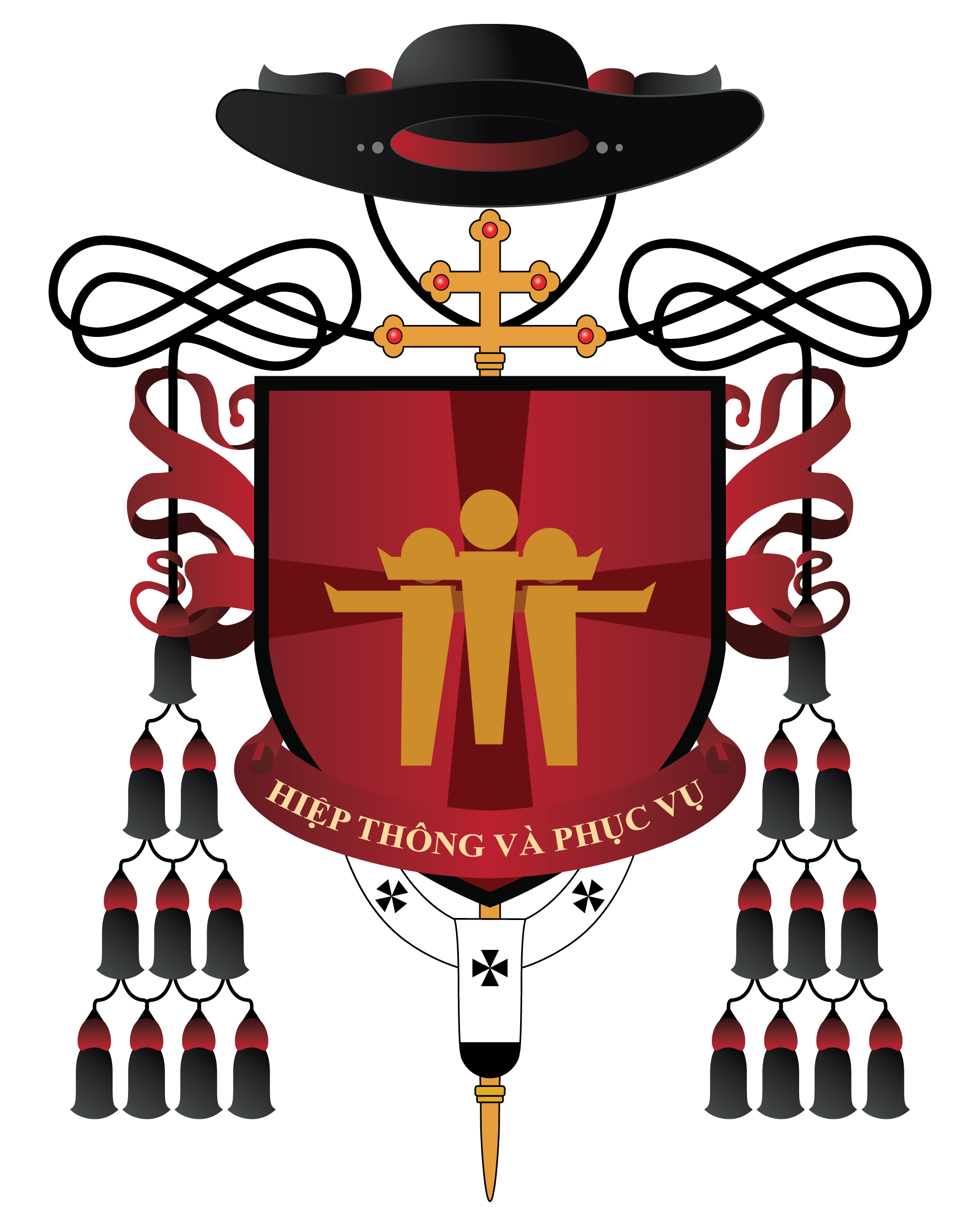
- Reference style: His Excellency; The Most Reverend
- Spoken style: Your Excellency
- Religious style: Archbishop

Ordination history
History
Priestly ordination
- Ordained by: Paul Marie Nguyễn Minh Nhật
Episcopal consecration
- Principal consecrator: Dominique Nguyễn Chu Trinh
- Co-consecrators: Joseph Nguyễn Chí Linh; Joseph Nguyễn Văn Yến
Episcopal succession
Bishops consecrated by Joseph Nguyễn Năng as principal consecrator
- Joseph Bùi Công Trác: 3 January 2023
- Peter Kiều Công Tùng: 16 May 2023
- John Baptist Nguyễn Quang Tuyến: 23 June 2026

Joseph Nguyễn Năng (born 24 November 1953) is a Vietnamese Catholic prelate serving as the fourth Archbishop of Hồ Chí Minh City since 2019. He previously served as the third Bishop of Phát Diệm from 2009 to 2019. He has been president of the Catholic Bishops' Conference of Vietnam since October 2022.

== Biography ==
Nguyễn Năng was born on 24 November 1953 in Phúc Nhạc, Ninh Bình Province. In 1954, he and his entire family moved to the South following the First Indochina War. He studied at the minor seminary of Saigon from 1962 to 1970 and at the major seminary of Saint Pius X in Dalat from 1975 to 1978. While a seminarian, he served at the Diocesan Institute Petit Apôtre in Bach Lam, Thong Nhat, Dong Nai from 1977 to 1988 and at the Thuận Hòa parish, Biên Hòa from 1988 to 1990. He was ordained a priest at the Cathedral of Xuân Lộc on 9 June 1990.

== Priestly service ==
Following his ordination, he was Pastor and Dean of the Thuận Hòa parish from 1990 to 1998. From 1998 to 2002, he studied at the Pontifical Urban University (Urbaniana) in Rome, earning a degree in dogmatic theology. From 2002 to 2008, he was Rector of the Major Seminary of Xuân Lộc.

== Episcopate ==
On 25 July 2009, Pope Benedict XVI appointed him Bishop of Phát Diệm, the diocese where he was born. His episcopal consecration was held at the Cathedral of Phát Diệm on 8 September 2009.

On 19 October 2019, Pope Francis appointed him Archbishop of Hồ Chí Minh City.
