= List of cathedrals in Peru =

This is the list of cathedrals in Peru sorted by denomination.

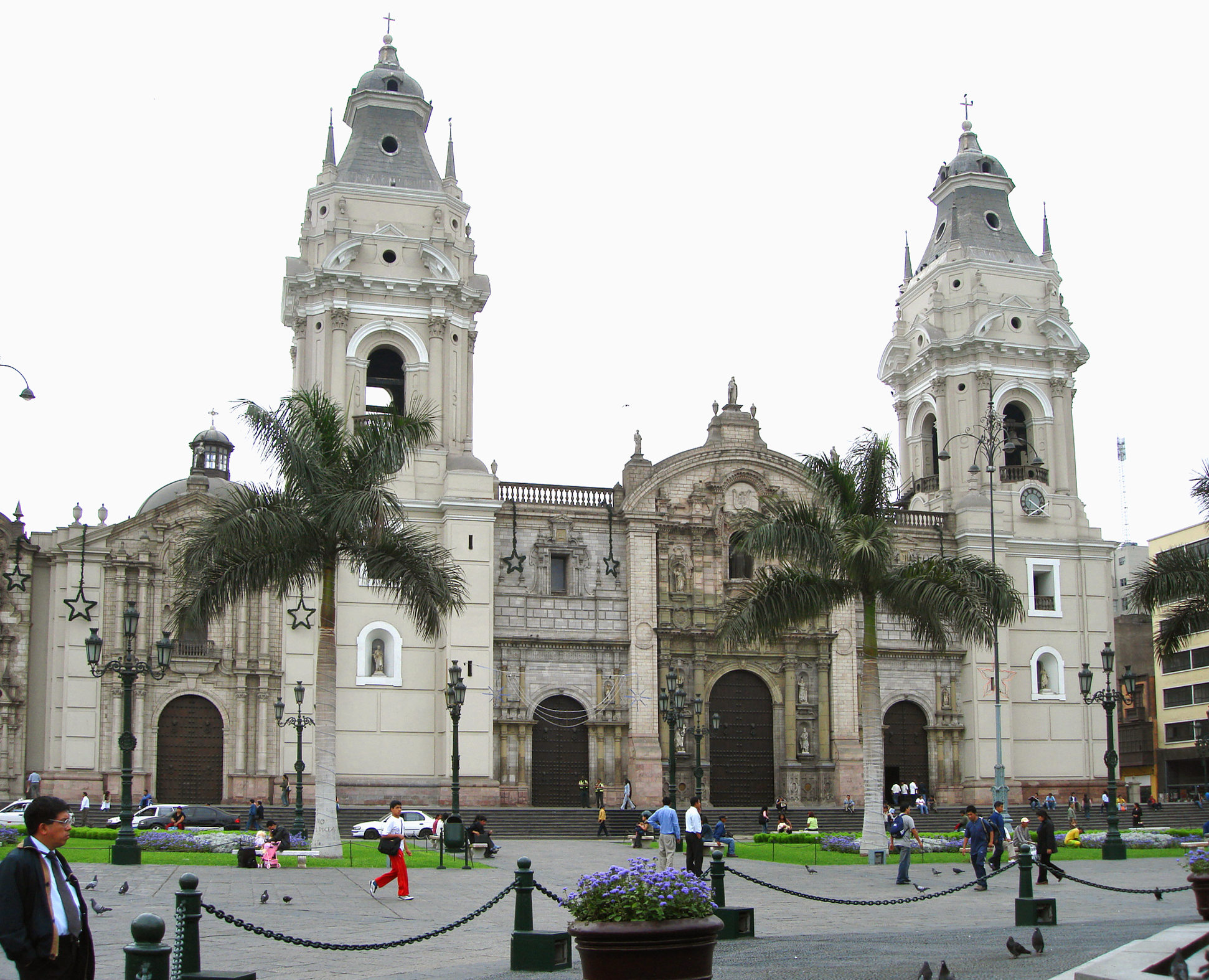
Cathedral Basilica of St. John the Apostle and Evangelist in Lima.

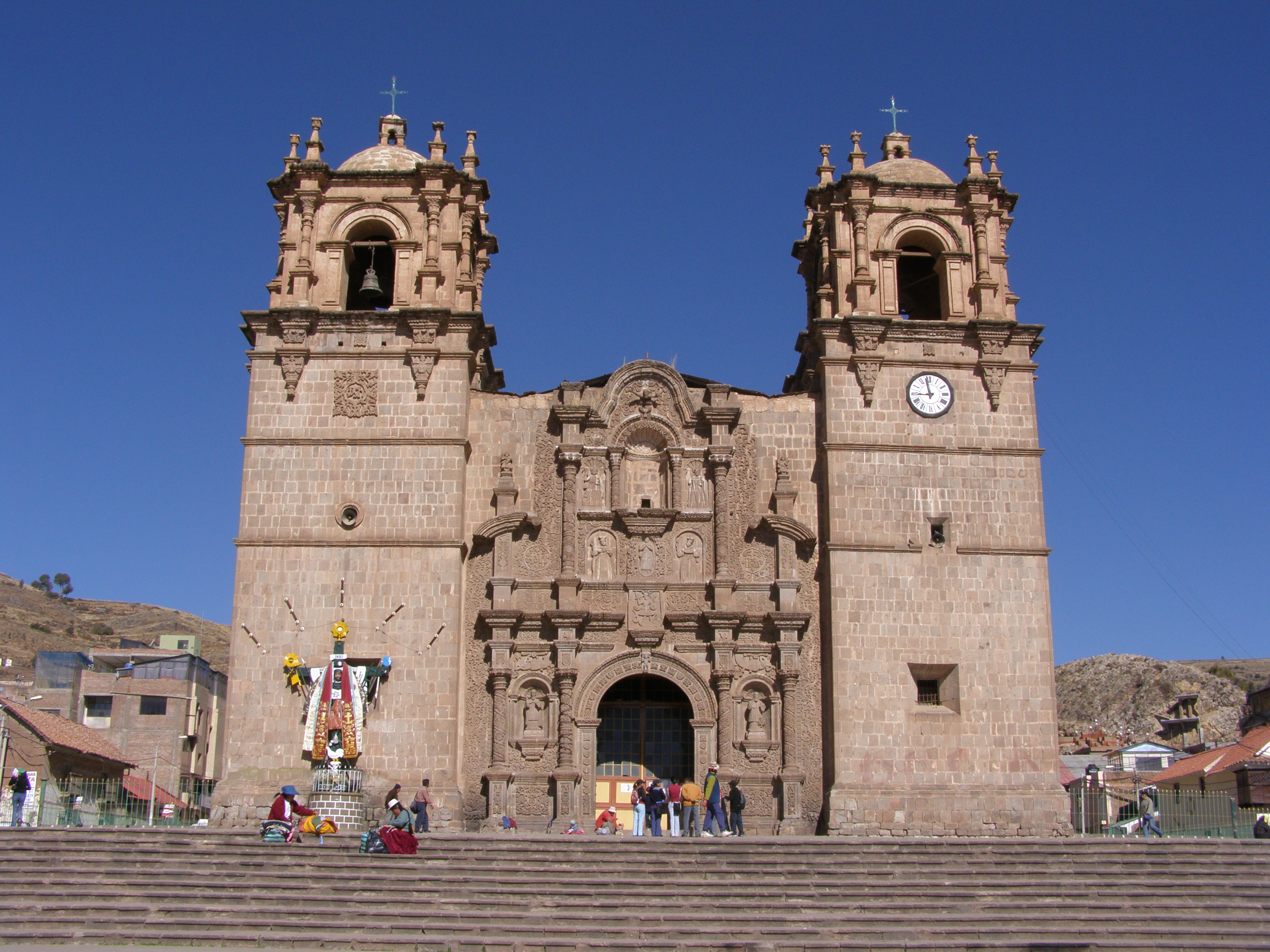
Cathedral Basilica of St. Charles Borromeo in Puno.

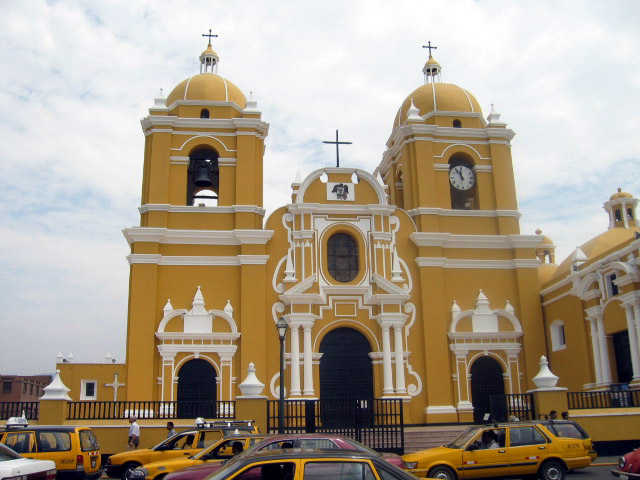
Cathedral Basilica of St. Mary in Trujillo.

== Catholic ==
Cathedrals of the Catholic Church in Peru:

- Cathedral of the Virgin of Rosary in Abancay
- Cathedral Basilica of St. Mary in Arequipa
- Cathedral Basilica of St. Mary in Ayacucho
- Cathedral of St. Francis of Assisi in Ayaviri
- Cathedral of St. Catherine in Cajamarca
- Cathedral of St. Joseph in Callao
- Cathedral of the Good Shepherd in Carabayllo
- St. John the Baptist Cathedral in Chachapoyas
- Cathedral of St. Mary in Chiclayo
- Cathedral of Our Lady of Mount Carmel and St. Peter in Chimbote
- Cathedral of the Holy Family in Chulucanas
- Cathedral of the Immaculate Conception in Chuquibamba
- Cathedral Basilica of Our Lady of the Assumption in Cusco
- Cathedral of St. Batholomew in Huacho
- Cathedral of St. Augustine in Huamachuco
- Cathedral of St. Antony in Huancavélica
- Cathedral of the Most Holy Trinity in Huancayo
- Cathedral of the Lord of Burgos in Huánuco
- Cathedral of Saint Sebastian and the Immaculate Conception in Huaraz
- Cathedral of the Lord of Solitude in Huaraz
- St. Jerome Cathedral in Ica
- Cathedral of St. John the Baptist in Iquitos
- Cathedral Basilica of St. John the Apostle and Evangelist in Lima
- Cathedral of St. Peter in Lurín
- St. Dominic Co-Cathedral in Moquegua
- St. James Cathedral in Moyobamba
- Cathedral of St. Michael the Archangel in Piura
- Cathedral of the Immaculate Conception in Pucallpa
- Our Lady of the Rosary Cathedral in Puerto Maldonado
- Cathedral Basilica of St. Charles Borromeo in Puno
- Cathedral of St. Vincent Martyr in San Vicente de Cañete
- Our Lady of the Rosary Cathedral in Tacna
- Cathedral of St. Ann in Tarma
- Cathedral Basilica of St. Mary in Trujillo
- St. Nicholas Cathedral in Tumbes
- Cathedral of Our Lady of the Snows in Yurimaguas

== Anglican ==
Cathedrals of the Anglican Church of the Southern Cone of America:

- Cathedral of the Good Shepherd in Lima

== See also ==
- List of cathedrals
