= Church of St Clement, Nantes =

Catholic church in Nantes, France

- Église Saint-Clément de Nantes
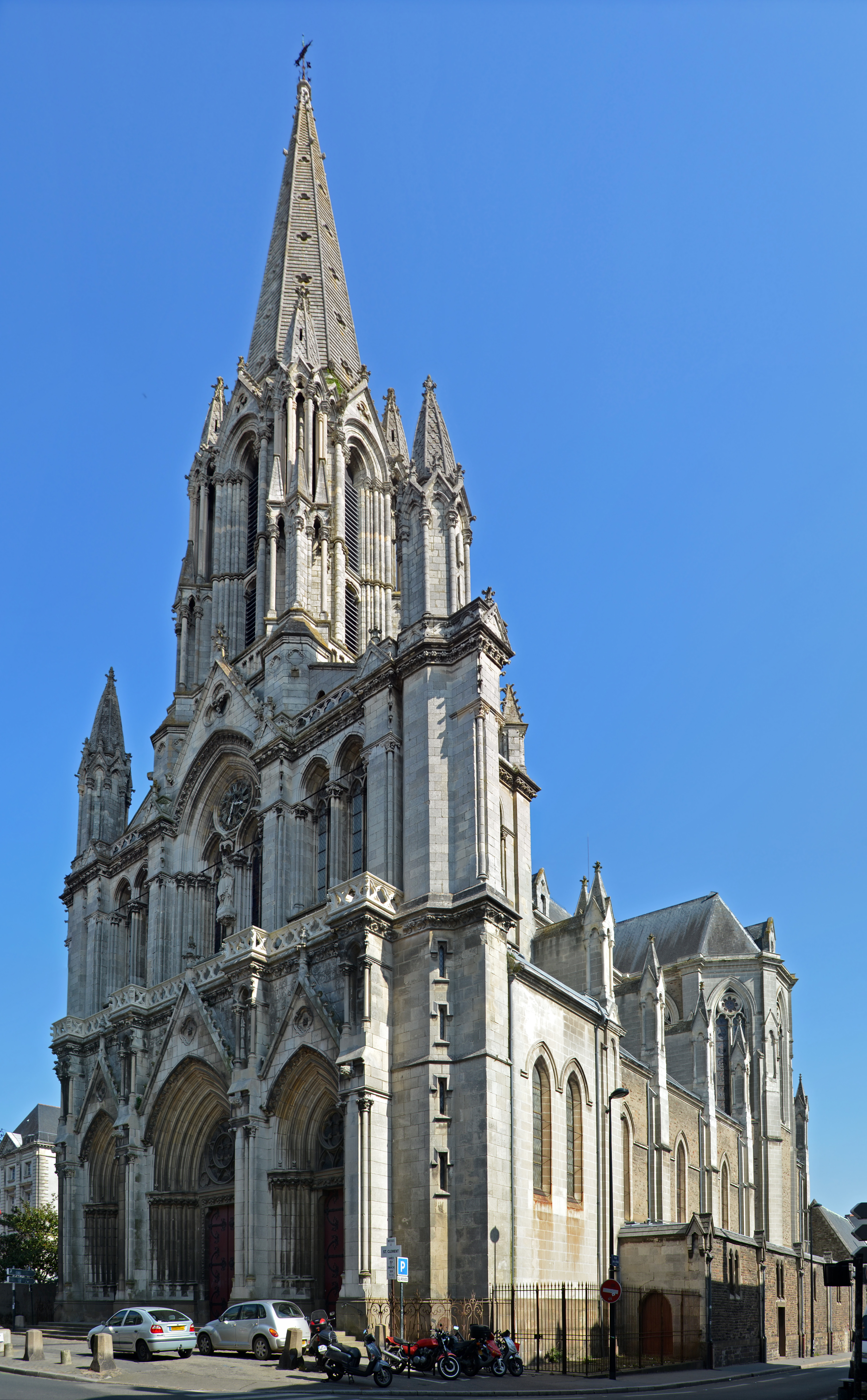
- Facade of the church

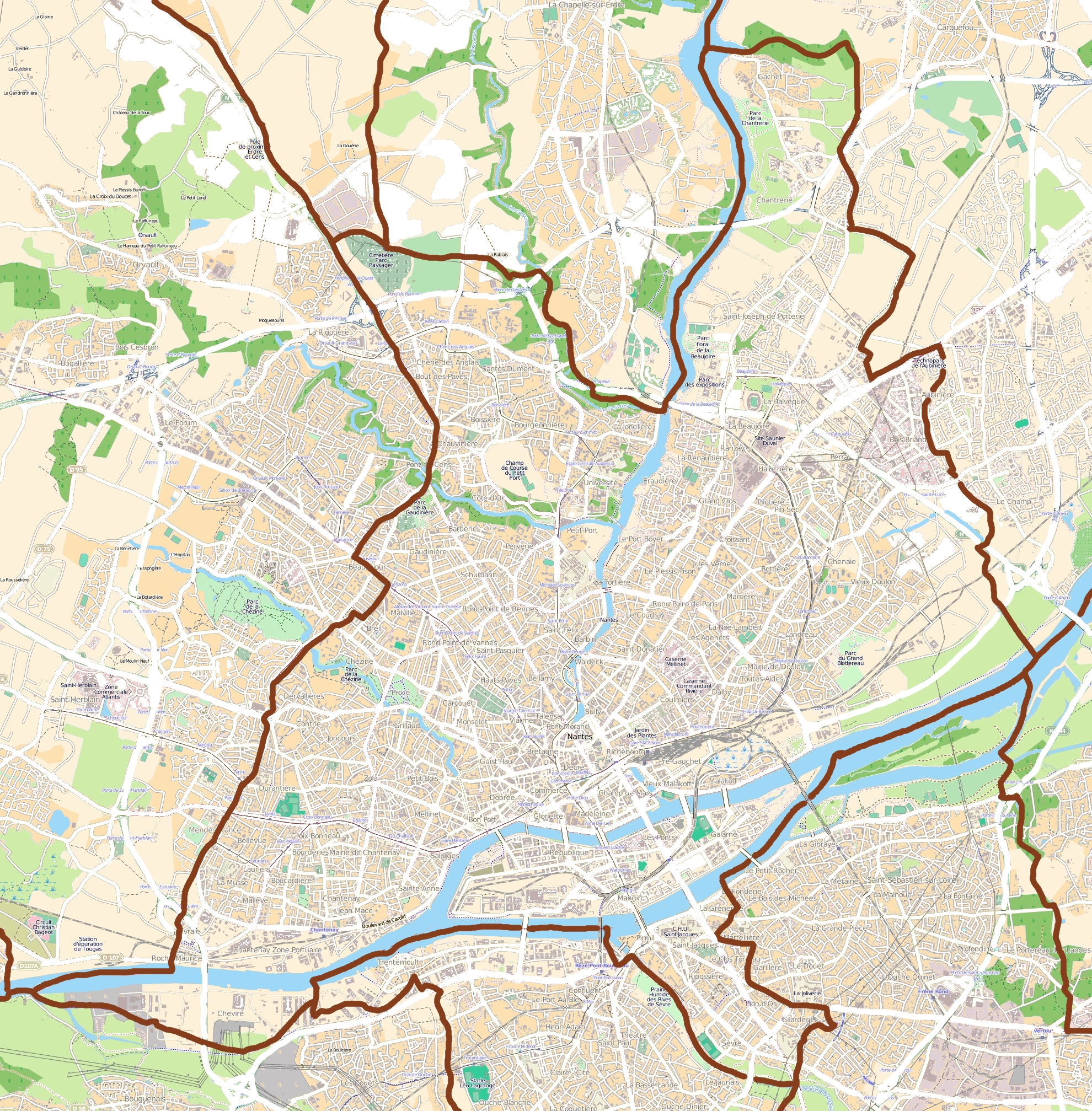
- Location within Nantes

Religion
- Affiliation: Catholic

Location
- Location: Nantes
- Country: France
- Coordinates: 47.2215°N 1.5470°W

Architecture
- Architects: François Liberge, Henry Faucheur et Eugène Boismen
- Style: Gothic Revival architecture
- Completed: 1875

The Church of St Clement (French: Église Saint-Clément) is a Catholic place of worship in Nantes, France, built in the 19th century. The Priestly Fraternity of Saint Peter holds services there according to the Tridentine rite.

== History ==
=== Origins ===
==== Chapel of the hospice of Saint Clement ====
In the 5th century (probably around 490), a chapel serving a charity hospice was built approximately 200 meters southeast of the current building. At that time, the structure was located outside the city walls, between what are now the Rue Sully and the Rue Geoffroy-Drouet. The chapel's founder, Bishop Gérémius, was buried there in 1498.

==== First Church of Saint Clement ====
In 1226, Peter I, Duke of Brittany, demolished the place of worship to make way for the city’s new fortifications, and in 1227, the first church dedicated to Saint Clement, the 4th pope and bishop of Rome and patron saint of mariners, was built at the corner of the present-day Rue Maréchal-Joffre and Rue Guibourg-de-Luzinais. This building faced west-east and was situated on the site of today's forecourt, extending two meters into the “Paris road” (now Rue Maréchal-Joffre). When the 19th-century church was constructed, the "old church" was still standing and was only demolished for the facade of the new building, except for the north wall, which served as a barrier for the construction site. The former southern side aisle was located at the level of the current church's bell tower.

The new structure, rectangular in shape, originally consisted of a single nave before two side aisles were added, with a pointed slate-covered bell tower housing three bells. A small porch at the entrance provided shelter before the doors opened.

During the Revolution, in 1791, the church was closed for worship and sold as national property under the name "Liberty and Demosthenes". In 1803, masses resumed, and the church welcomed Abbé Duproz as its first Concordat priest.

Repairs were carried out in 1812, 1813, and 1816. As the church had become dilapidated, work began on constructing a new place of worship.

=== The neo-Gothic church ===
At the same time, Théodore Nau completed the new choir of the Church of Sainte-Croix, and the architect Saint-Félix Seheult was entrusted with continuing the work on the cathedral from 1840 onward and this year marked a turning point in the architectural style of churches in the Nantes area, as the construction of neo-Gothic structures began to spread (the first being the Basilica of Saint-Nicolas, designed by Jean-Baptiste-Antoine Lassus). Architect François Liberge (1800–1860) chose this style for the construction of the Church of Saint Clement. Henri-Théodore Driollet, the city architect of Nantes, supported the project with Mayor Ferdinand Favre.

The work began under the leadership of the parish priest, Abbé Jean Richard, who had previously served as priest of Chantenay-sur-Loire for nine years before being assigned to Saint-Clément in 1838. He blessed the cornerstone of the new building on May 31, 1841.

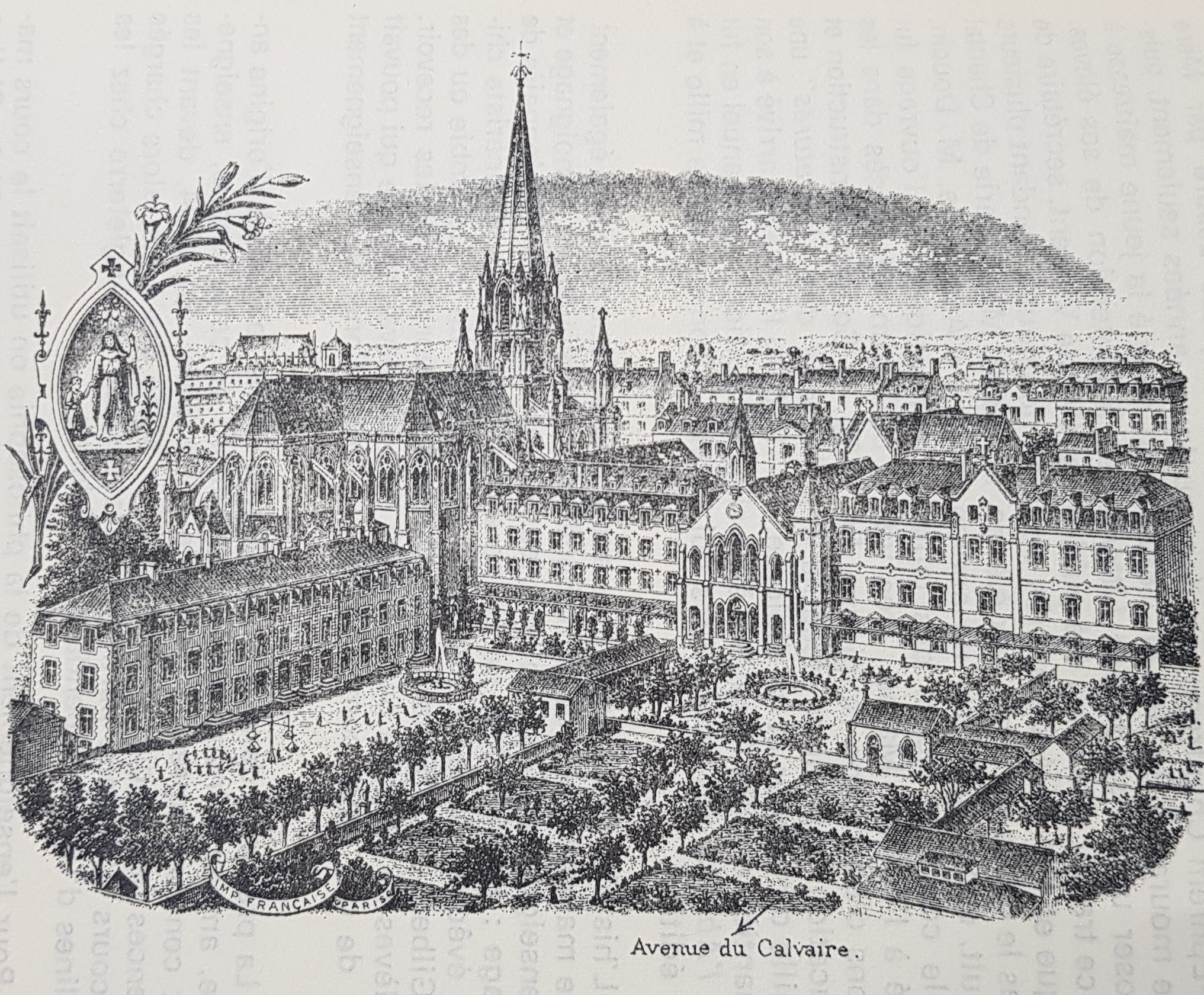
The former Ursulines de Nantes convent and Saint-Clément church.

The first completed sections included the three naves, the transept, and the apse, oriented northwest-southeast, situated between Rue Lorette-de-la-Refoulais and Rue Guibourg-de-Luzinais. In 1845, with the walls reaching a height of 12 meters, funding ran out. Construction resumed on May 1, 1851, lasting six years. Starting in 1854, work began on the vaulting for the central nave and the aisles. The doors and stained glass windows were created by master glassmaker Échappé. On December 25, 1857, Bishop Jaquemet blessed the church in the presence of the diocese's Vicar General, François-Marie-Benjamin Richard (future Cardinal Archbishop of Paris), and the first mass was celebrated by Abbé Richard, who died a year later.

In 1860, the construction of the facade began under the leadership of the new parish priest, Donatien Demouy. The plans were drawn up by architect Henry Faucheur, who was later replaced by Eugène Boismen on July 4, 1865. Boismen completed the church spire, which was finished on May 15, 1868, and crowned with a cross blessed on August 23, 1874.

Initially equipped with a harmonium, the church received a Cavaillé-Coll organ on January 25, 1867. In 1892, organ builder Louis Debierre, whose workshops were located nearby, provided a new organ. This was a revolutionary instrument, featuring an electric transmission system invented by Debierre in 1888, allowing the organ to be installed in two cases within two side arches. The organ was restored in 1978 by Joseph Debierre of the Beuchet-Debierre firm, and again in 2012 by Stéphane Robert of Robert Frères.

The church underwent a renovation from 1951 to 1954.

=== The parish priests ===
- 1791: Pierre Bintin;
- 1791: Father Jean-Paul Marie Anne Latyl (declined the position);
- 1803–1838: Father Duproz;
- 1838–1858: Father Jean Richard;
- 1860s: Donatien Demouy;
- 1900-1906: Father François Moreau;
- 1906-1931: Father Pierre Portier;
- 1949–1968: Xavier Morilleau;
- 1968–1970: Father Michel Viot;
- 2000–2021: Father Yves Chéreau;
- 2021–present: Father Hubert Vallet.

Currently, three priests from the Priestly Fraternity of Saint Peter serve here and celebrate mass according to the Tridentine Rite. Father Guilhem Le Coq and Father Gauthier Guillaume serve as parish vicars.

== Gallery ==
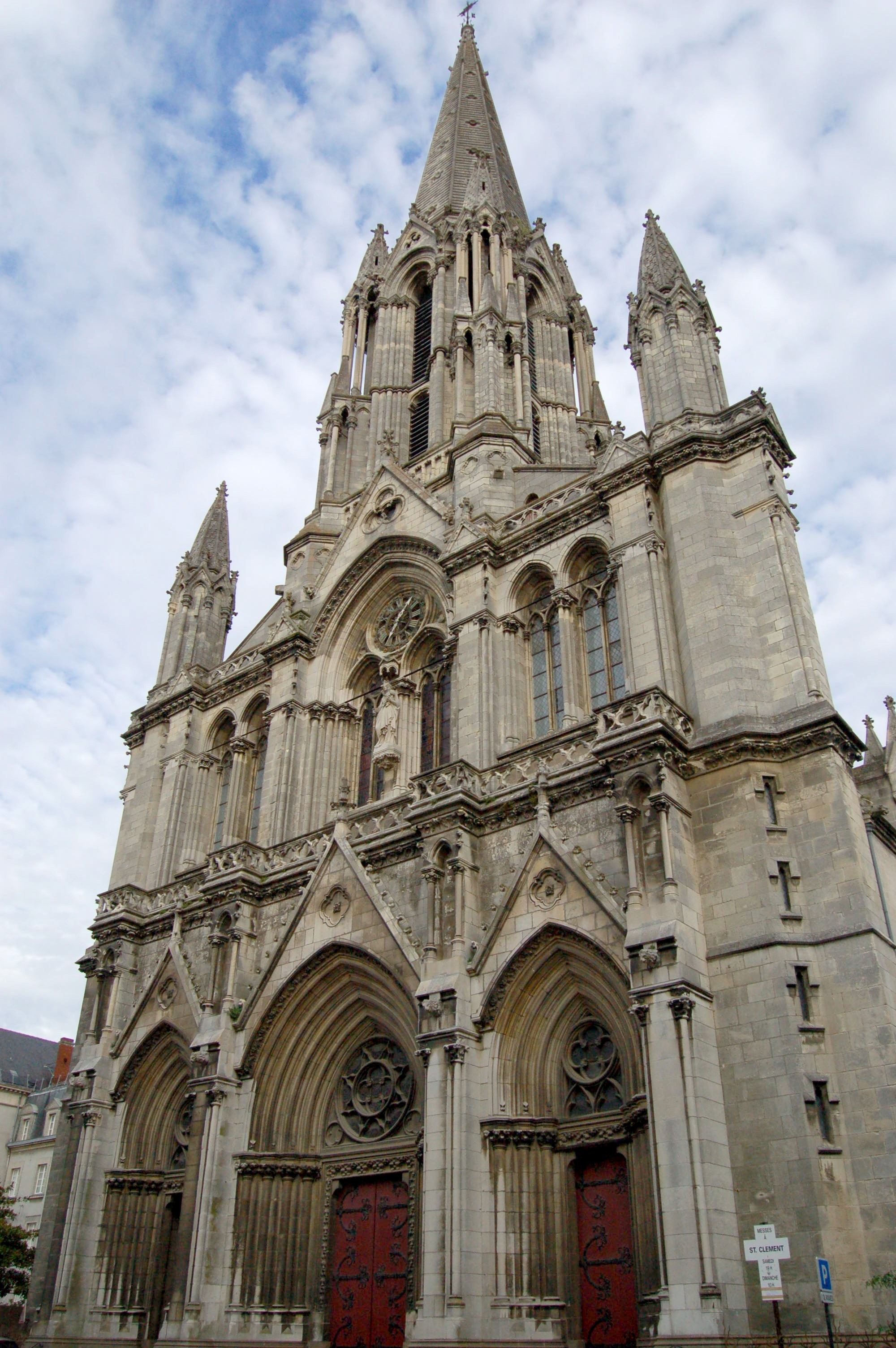
Facade

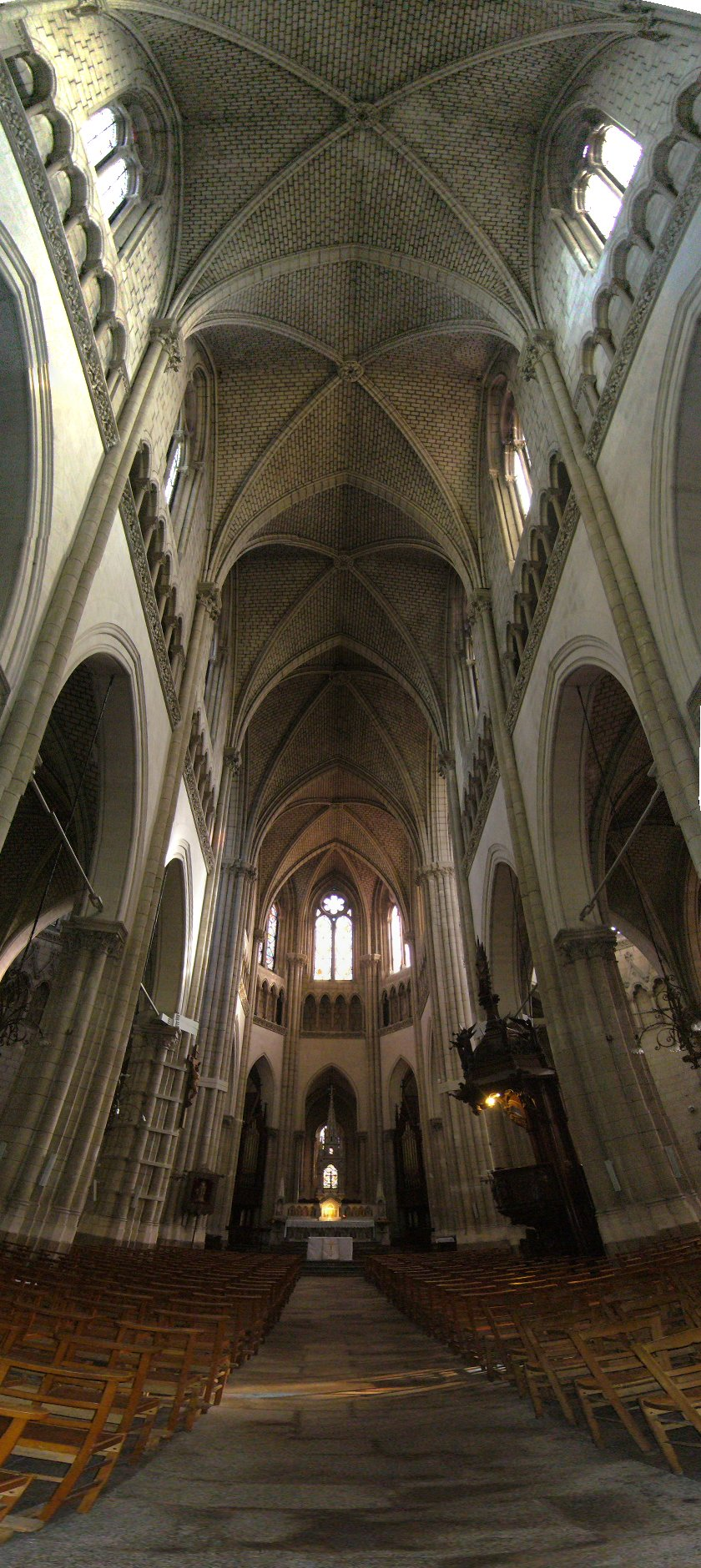
The nave

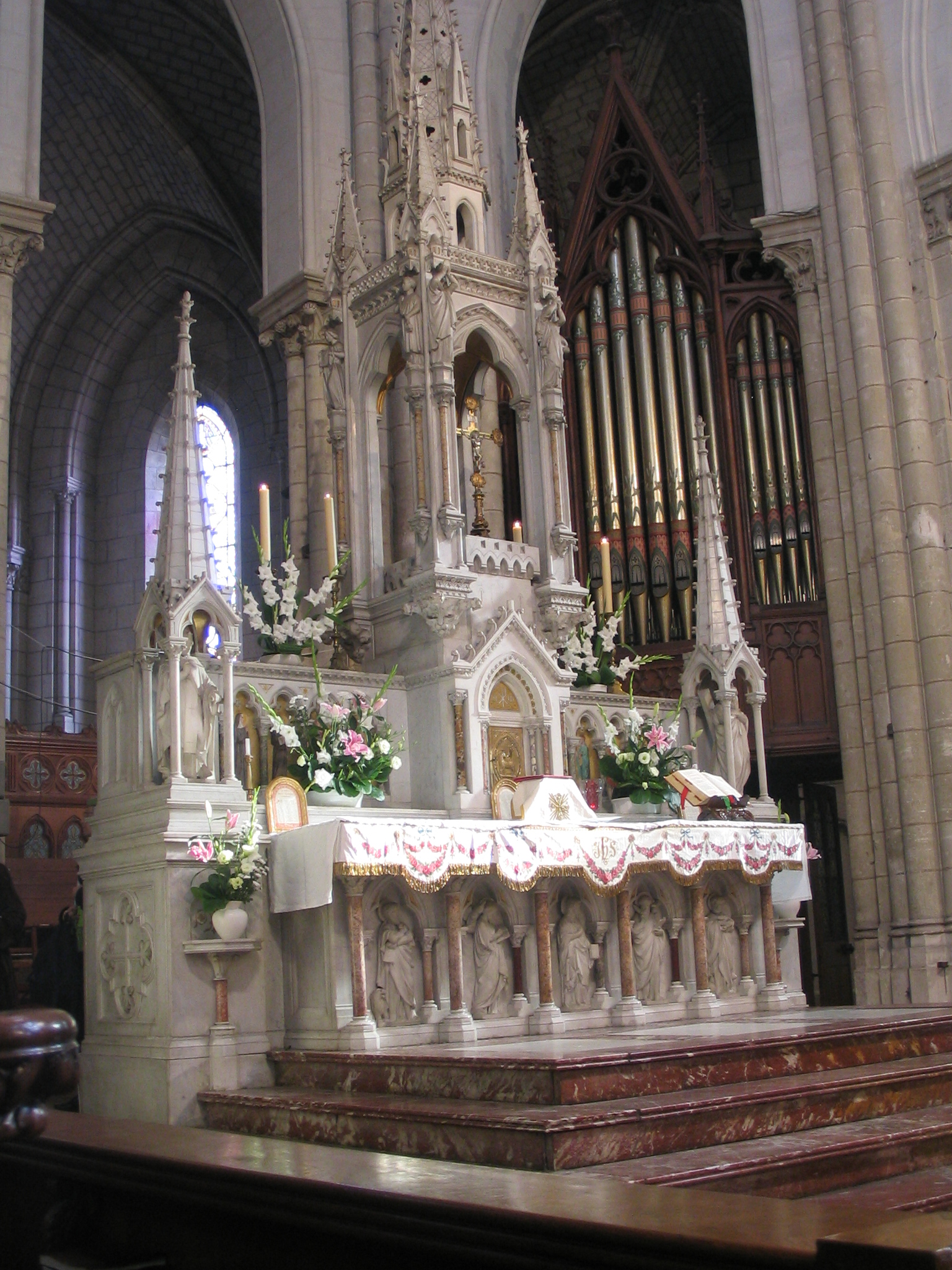
Richly decorated altar and choir organ with painted pipes

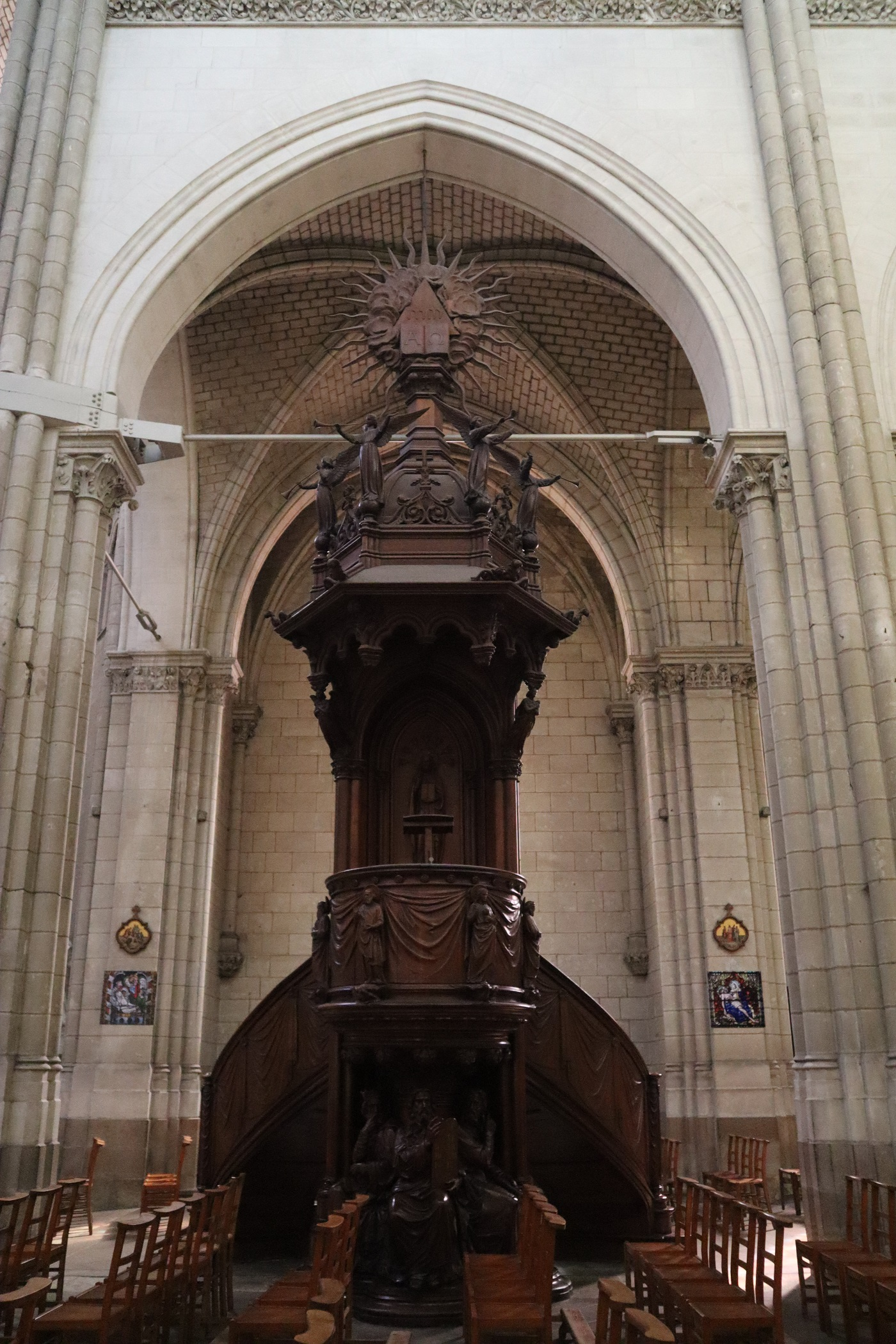
Chair

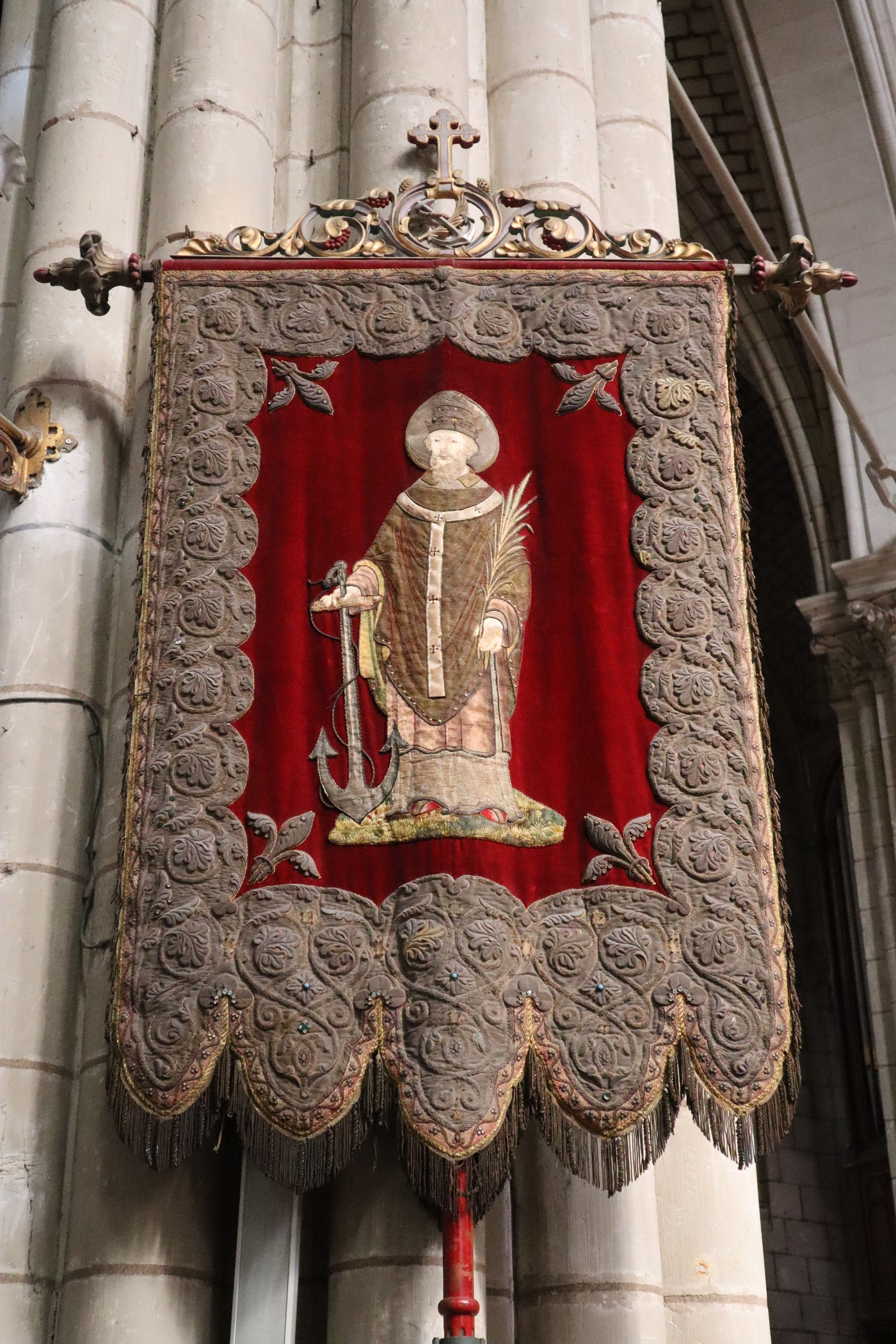
Interior, with parish banner

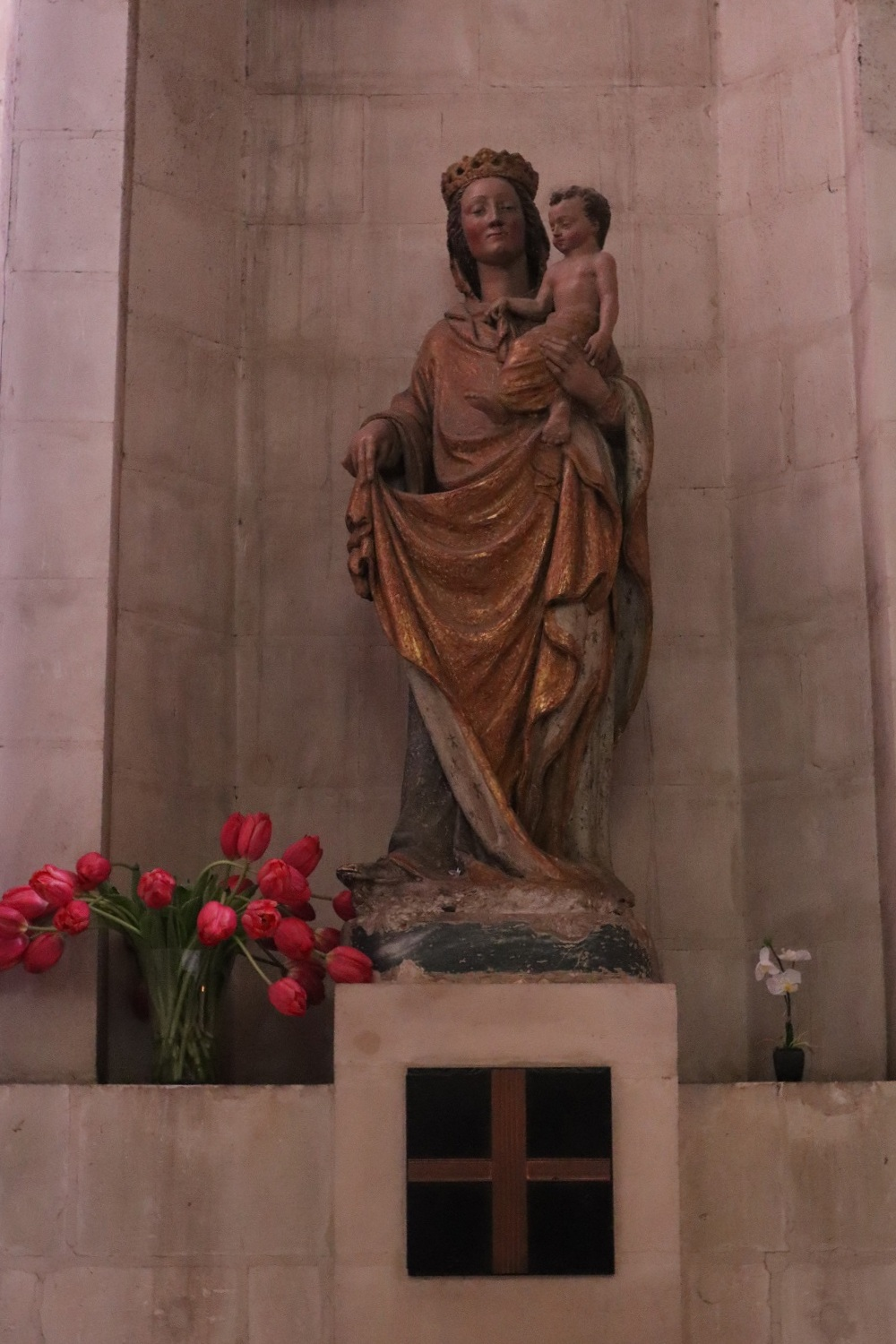
Statue of the Virgin and Child in the apse chapel

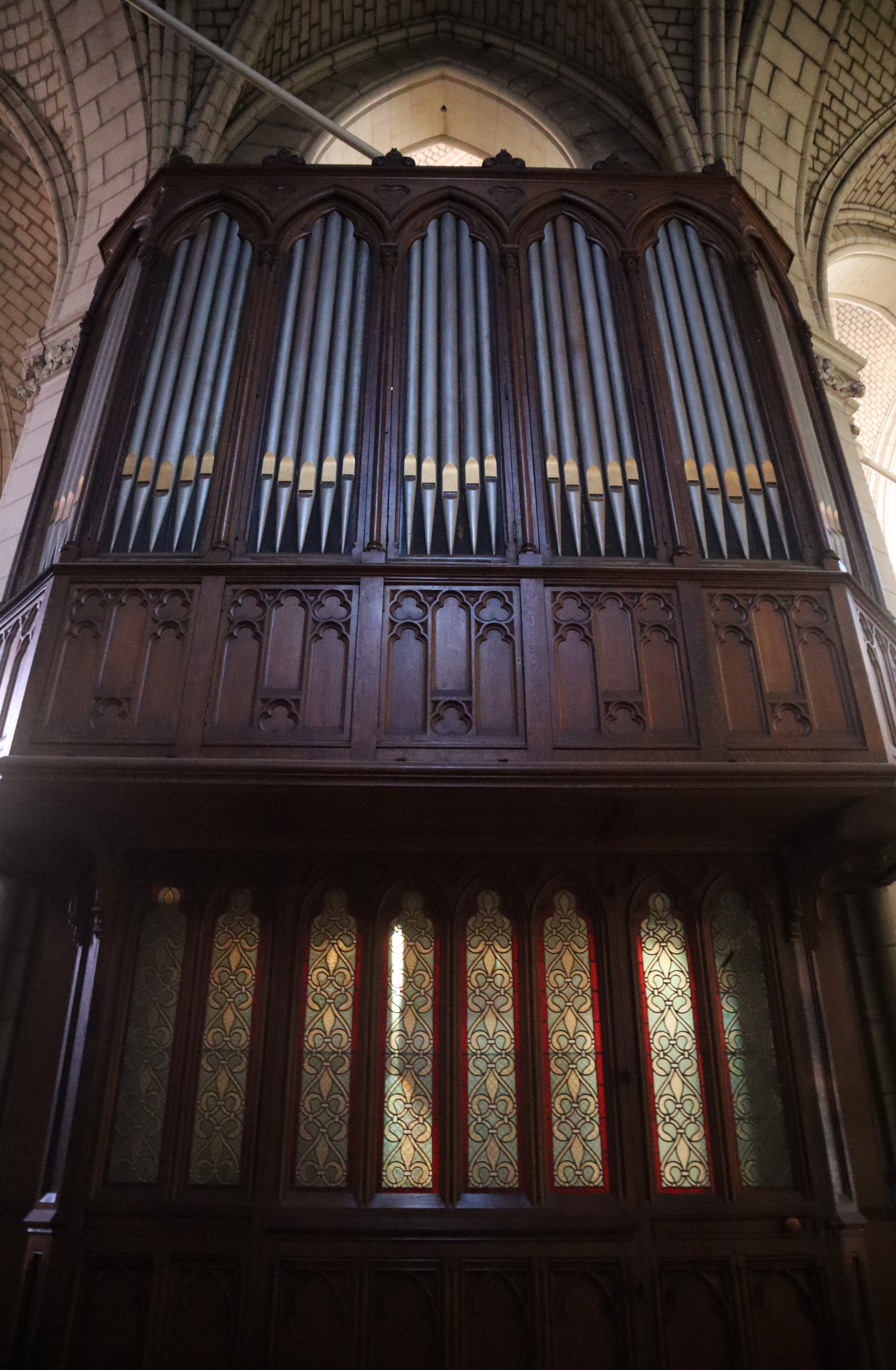
Left organ case, built in 1893 by Nantes organ builder Louis Debierre; 26 real stops on 3 manuals and pedalboard, electric transmission, originally with two consoles, later with a single console

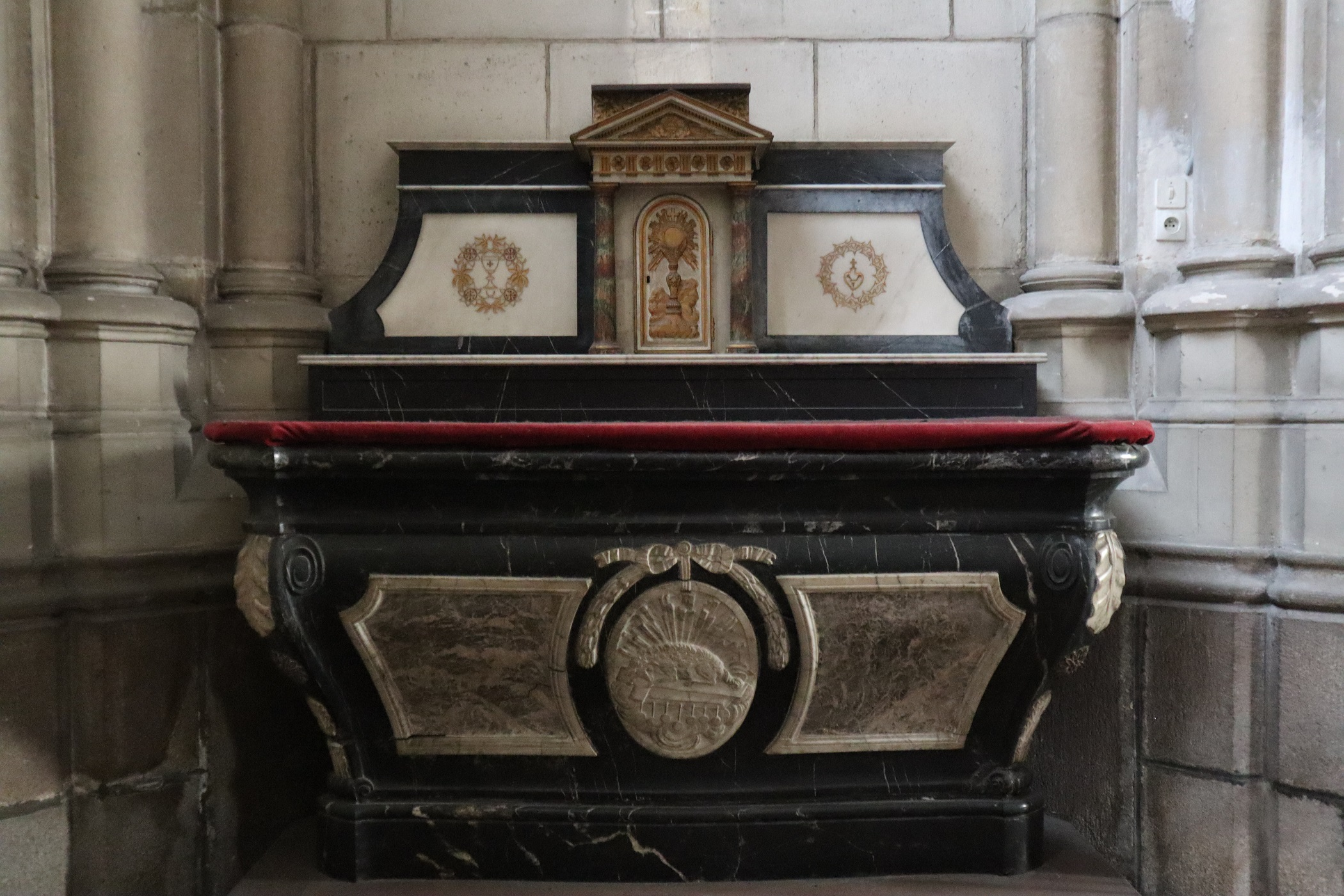
Altar in the 1st left side chapel (east).
