= St. Nicholas Cathedral =

St. Nicholas Cathedral, or variations on the name, may refer to buildings dedicated to Saint Nicholas in the following places:

== Australia ==
- St Nicholas Russian Orthodox Cathedral, Brisbane, Queensland

== Austria ==
- Feldkirch Cathedral

== China ==
- Saint Nicholas Cathedral, Harbin

== Cyprus ==
- Saint Nicolas Cathedral, Famagusta, now Lala Mustafa Pasha Mosque

== Czech Republic ==
- Cathedral of St Nicholas, České Budějovice

== Denmark ==
- Garðar Cathedral Ruins, Igaliku, Greenland

== Estonia ==
- Haapsalu Castle and cathedral

== Finland ==
- St Nicolas Church, the former name until 1917 of the Finnish Evangelical Lutheran Helsinki Cathedral
- Saint Nicholas Cathedral, Kuopio

== France ==
- Russian Orthodox Cathedral, Nice

== Ireland ==
- Cathedral of Our Lady Assumed into Heaven and St Nicholas, Galway

== Italy ==
- Palmi Cathedral
- Sassari Cathedral

== Kazakhstan ==
- St. Nicholas Cathedral (Almaty)

== Latvia ==
- St. Nicholas Naval Cathedral, Karosta

== Monaco ==
- Saint Nicholas Cathedral, Monaco

== Peru ==
- St. Nicholas Cathedral, Tumbes, Peru
- Cathedral of St. Nicholas, Caracas, Venezuela, an Eastern Orthodox church serving the Russian-Venezuelan community

== Poland ==
- Orthodox Cathedral of St. Nicholas, Białystok
- Cathedral of St. Nicholas, Bielsko-Biała
- Bydgoszcz Cathedral
- St. Nicholas Cathedral, Elbląg
- Cathedral of St. Nicholas the Bishop in Kalisz
- Łowicz Cathedral

== Romania ==
- St. Andrew and St. Nicholas Orthodox Cathedral, Galați
- St. Nicholas Cathedral, Oradea
- Cathedral of Saint Nicholas, Râmnicu Vâlcea, the seat of the archdiocese of Râmnic
- St. Nicholas Cathedral, Tulcea

== Russia ==
- Saint Nicholas Cathedral, Novgorod
- Kronstadt Naval Cathedral, Saint Petersburg
- St. Nicholas Naval Cathedral, Saint Petersburg

== Serbia ==
- St. Nicholas Cathedral, Ruski Krstur
- Sremski Karlovci Orthodox Cathedral

== Slovakia ==
- Co-Cathedral of Saint Nicholas, Prešov

== Slovenia ==
- Ljubljana Cathedral
- Murska Sobota Cathedral
- Novo Mesto Cathedral

== South Korea ==
- St. Nicholas Cathedral (Seoul)

== Spain ==
- Concatedral de San Nicolás, Alicante

== Switzerland ==
- Fribourg Cathedral

== Tajikistan ==
- St. Nicholas Cathedral (Dushanbe)

== Ukraine ==
- St. Nicholas Military Cathedral in Kyiv
- St. Nicholas Cathedral, Nizhyn

== United Kingdom ==
- Newcastle Cathedral St Nicholas Cathedral
- St Nicholas Greek Orthodox Cathedral, Shepherd's Bush

== United States ==
- St. Nicholas Greek Orthodox Cathedral (Tarpon Springs, Florida)
- St. Nicholas Cathedral (Chicago), Illinois
- St. Nicholas Russian Orthodox Cathedral, New York City
- Saint Nicholas Greek Orthodox Cathedral (Pittsburgh), Pennsylvania
- St. Nicholas Cathedral (Washington, D.C.)
- Saint Nicholas Russian Orthodox Cathedral (Seattle), a Seattle landmark, Washington

== Vietnam ==
- St. Nicholas Cathedral, Da Lat

== See also ==
- Saint Nicholas's Church (disambiguation)
- Basilica of Saint Nicholas (disambiguation)
