= Basilica of Saint Nicholas =

Basilica of Saint Nicholas may refer to:

- Basilica of Saint Nicholas, Nantes, church in Nantes, France
- Basilica of Saint Nicholas, Bari, church in Bari, Italy
- Basilica of Saint Nicholas, Amsterdam, church in Amsterdam, Netherlands
- Basilica of St. Nicholas, Gdańsk, Poland
- Cathedral Basilica of the Assumption of the Blessed Virgin Mary and St. Nicholas, church in Łowicz, Poland

== See also ==
- Saint Nicholas's Church (disambiguation)
- Cathedral of Saint Nicholas (disambiguation)
