= Cathedral of the Most Holy Trinity, Huancayo =

Coordinates: 12.0675°S 75.2097°W

Cathedral of the Most Holy Trinity
- Catedral de la Santísima Trinidad
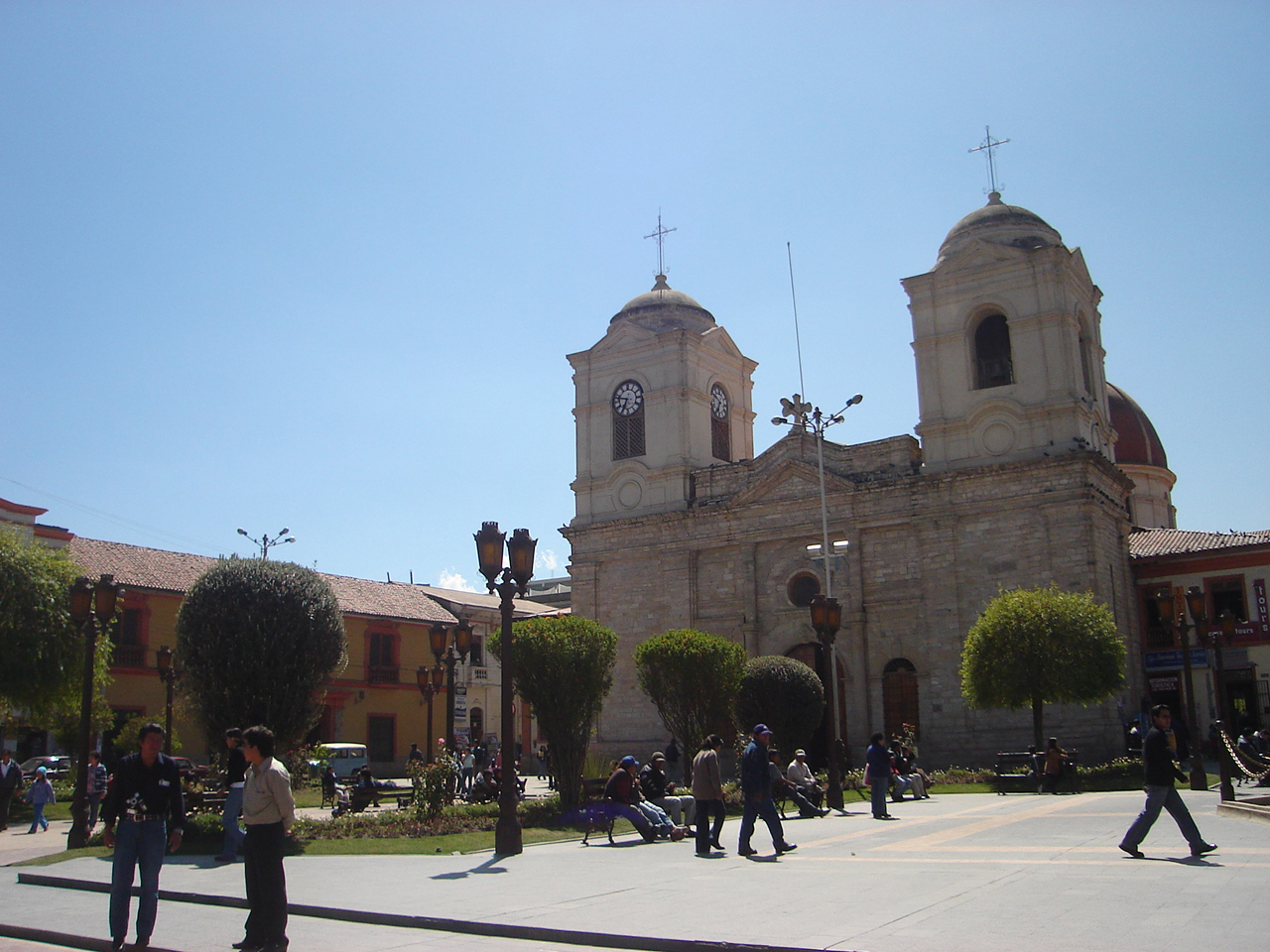
- Cathedral of the Most Holy Trinity
- Location: Huancayo
- Country: Peru
- Denomination: Roman Catholic Church

The Cathedral of the Most Holy Trinity (Spanish: Catedral de la Santísima Trinidad) also called Huancayo Cathedral is the largest church in the city of Huancayo in Peru. It is located in the west of the Constitutión Square, it is neoclassical and inside preserves paintings from the Cusco School of painting. It is seat of the Archbishop of Huancayo.

This cathedral, known initially as Matriz Cathedral, was built on land donated by remarkable neighbors. Its construction began on March 18, 1799 ending March 18, 1831. By bull of Pope Pius XII it was elevated to Cathedral Church in 1955 thus surpassing another remarkable huancaína church, the Basilica of the Immaculate Conception. It is consecrated to the Holy Trinity, to whom the city of Huancayo was dedicated in 1572.

== See also ==
- List of cathedrals in Peru
- Roman Catholicism in Peru
