= St. Jerome Cathedral, Ica =

Coordinates: 14.0647°S 75.7296°W

St. Jerome Cathedral
- Catedral de San Jerónimo
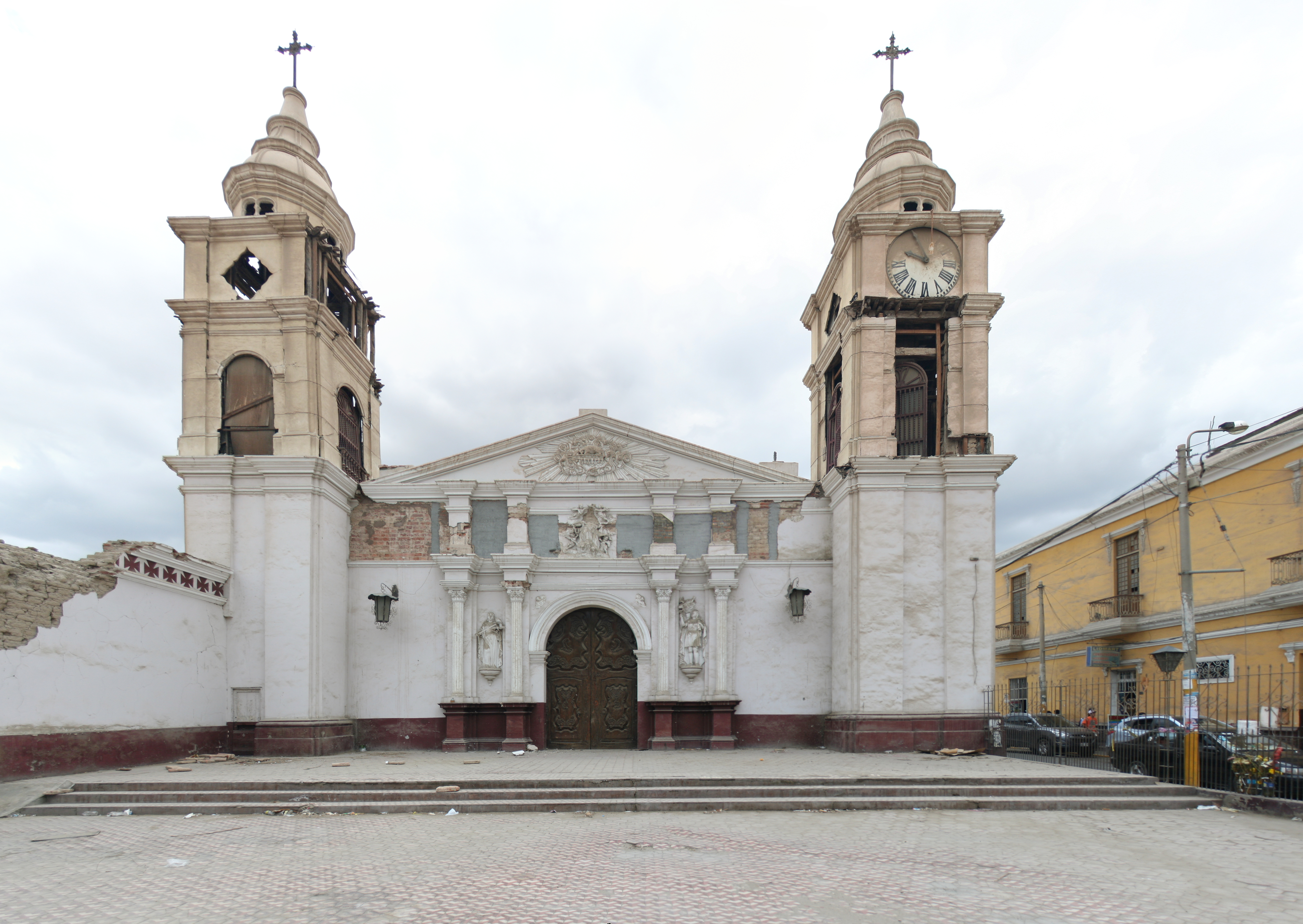
- St. Jerome Cathedral
- Location: Ica
- Country: Peru
- Denomination: Roman Catholic Church

Architecture
- Architectural type: church
- Style: Neoclassical, Baroque

Administration
- Diocese: Roman Catholic Diocese of Ica

St. Jerome Cathedral, (Spanish: Catedral de San Jerónimo) also known as Ica Cathedral, is a Catholic church in the city of Ica, Peru. It is located on Bolivar street, and forms part of the monumental group of the Company of Jesus.

The church was constructed in the 18th century, and was later retouched in 1814. It was renovated after damage incurred during an earthquake in 2007.

The exterior part of the cathedral building is in the Neoclassical architectural style, and the interior is in the Baroque tradition.

== See also ==
- List of cathedrals in Peru
- Roman Catholicism in Peru
- St. Jerome
- 18th-century Western domes
