= St. Nicholas Cathedral, Da Lat =

St. Nicholas Cathedral
- Cathédrale Saint-Nicolas
- Nhà thờ Chính tòa Thánh Nicola Bari
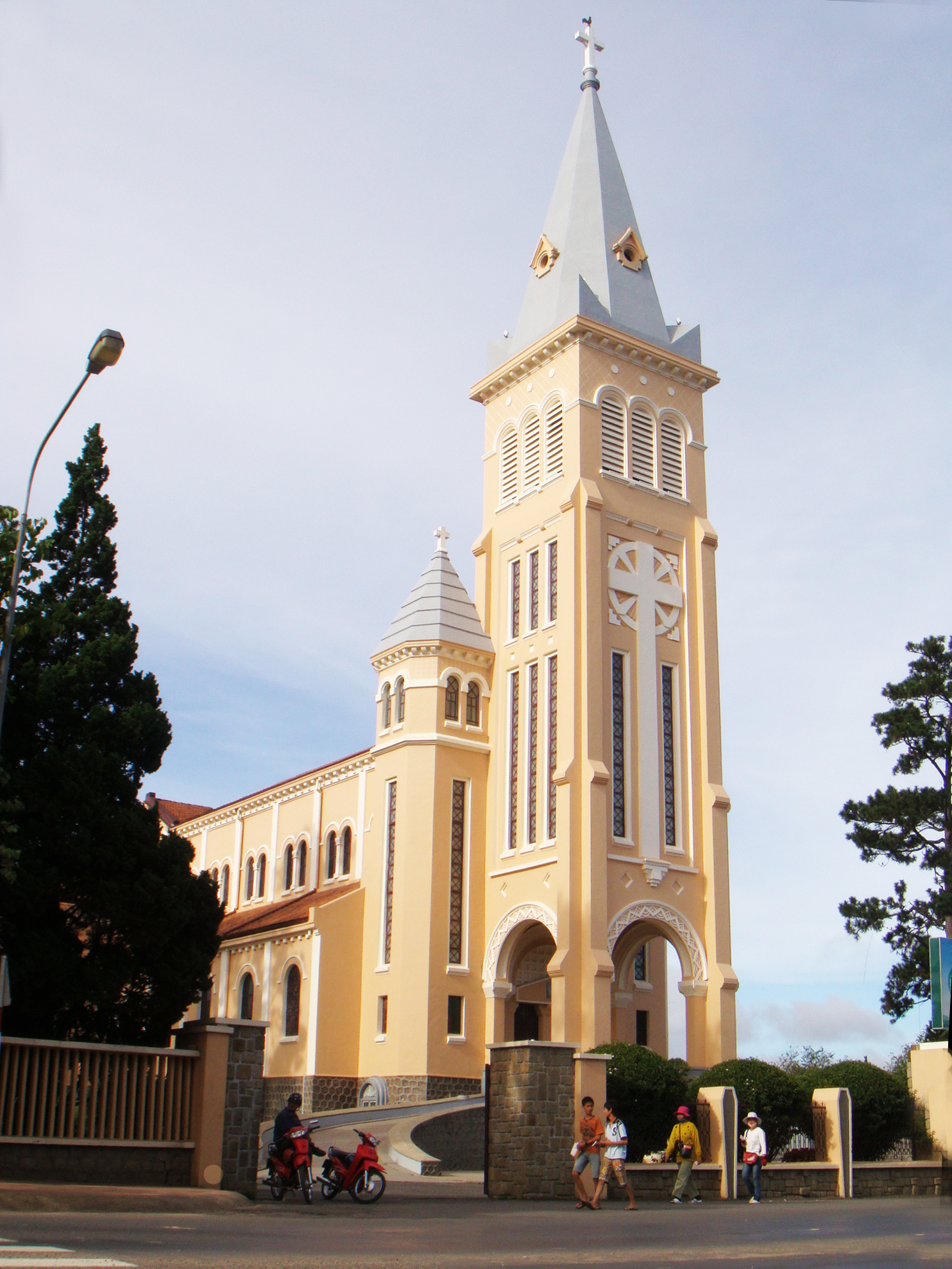

- Location within Vietnam Location within Southeast Asia Location within Asia
- Location: Da Lat
- Country: Vietnam
- Denomination: Roman Catholic Church

The St. Nicholas Cathedral (Vietnamese: Nhà thờ Chính tòa Đà Lạt, French: Cathédrale Saint-Nicolas) also called St. Nicholas of Bari Cathedral (Nhà thờ Chính tòa Thánh Nicola Bari) is the cathedral of the Roman Catholic Diocese of Đà Lạt, suffragan of the Archdiocese of Ho Chi Minh City (alternatively still called Saigon), located in Da Lat, the capital of Lam Dong province in the Central Highlands of Vietnam.

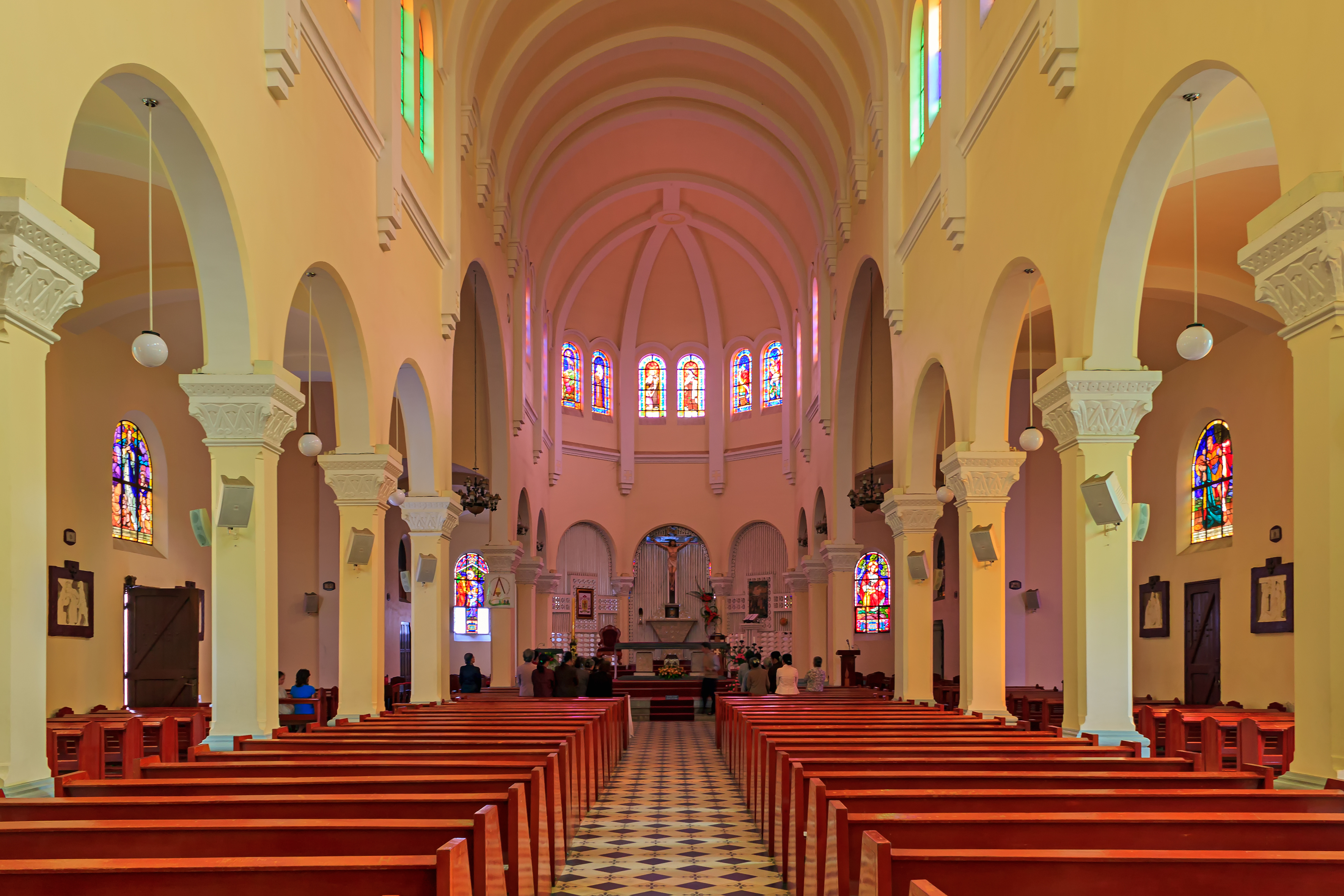
The interior of St. Nicholas Cathedral

Originally built as a parish church in 1920 — to replace an even older church that had been built in 1917 — under Fr. Frédéric Sidot and subsequently rebuilt in 1922, the Cathedral was constructed by the French in 1931–1932 in an eclectic style Romanesque. Archbishop Colomban Dreyer – the Apostolic Delegate to Indochina – laid the cornerstone on 19 July 1931. On 14 November 1934, the cross that carries the brass weathercock (Note: This is viewed as either the Gallic rooster (French: le coq gaulois) - the national symbol of France or a symbol of penance as mentioned in the Gospels of the New Testament when a rooster began to crow after the denial of Peter.) was installed at the top of the spire of the central bell tower. The interior was not completed until 1942. The Cathedral was blessed in February of 1942.

There was a European cemetery around the church, which is no longer in use.

There are five masses every Sunday.

== See also ==
- Roman Catholicism in Vietnam
- St. Nicholas Cathedral (disambiguation)
