= St Nicholas Greek Orthodox Cathedral, Shepherd's Bush =

St Nicholas Greek Orthodox Cathedral
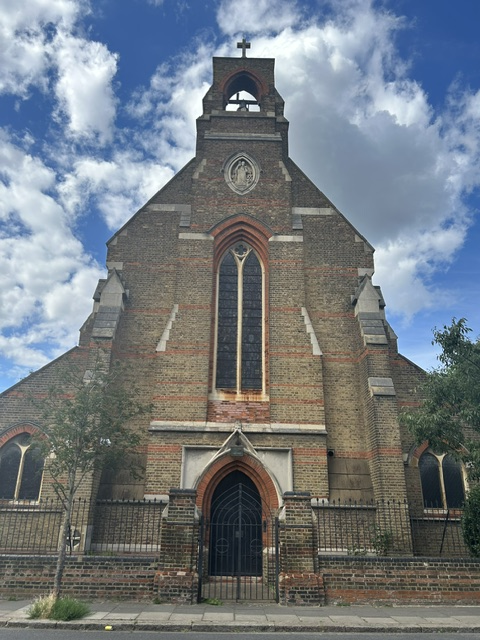
- St Nicholas Greek Orthodox Cathedral, Shepherd's Bush
- Godolphin Road, Shepherd's Bush Map
- 51.50417°N 0.23307°W
- Location: Shepherd's Bush, London
- Address: 60 Godolphin Road, W12
- Country: United Kingdom
- Language(s): Greek & English
- Denomination: Eastern Orthodox Cathedral
- Tradition: Greek Orthodox

History
- Former name(s): St Nicholas' Church, Shepherd's Bush
- Status: Cathedral and parish church
- Founded: 1965
- Dedication: Saint Nicholas of Myra
- Consecrated: 1985

Architecture
- Functional status: Active
- Heritage designation: Grade II Listed building
- Architect: Sir Arthur Blomfield
- Years built: 1882

Administration
- Archdiocese: Archdiiocese of Thyateira

Clergy
- Archbishop: Nikitas of Thyateira
- Rector: Fr Andreas Minic

St Nicholas Greek Orthodox Cathedral is a parish church and Cathedral that serves as a centre for the Greek Orthodox community in West London. Located on Godolphin Road in Shepherd's Bush. The cathedral is dedicated to Saint Nicholas, Bishop of Myra. The cathedral serves under the jurisdiction of the Greek Orthodox Archdiocese of Thyateira and Great Britain Continuing its patron saint's legacy of charity, the cathedral runs local philanthropic outreach led by its parish ladies' to help the poor in need.

== History ==
=== Roots of the Church ===
In 1877, vicar William Cooke requested to the Bishop of London's Fund for a grant to build the Church as the growing population was in Shepherd's Bush, and to the London Diocesan Home Missions for an assistant fund. A year later, in December 1878, St Stephen Infant School room (known as a mission room) was used for services until a temporary church could be built in Godolphine Road W12. A large number of attendance was growing. Two years later, In February 1880, architect Arthur William Blomfield drawn up a plan and a building committee was set up to raise funds for a permanent church, applying grants from; the Bishop of London's Fund, the Ecclesiastical Commissioners, the Incorporated Church Building Society, and the Trustees of Marshall's Charity.

In June 1882, the foundation stone was laid by Baroness Burdett-Coutts. The construction work began on the nave and side aisles. the church building was consecrated on 28 December as St Thomas the Apostle, Church of England. Five years later, in 1887, the chancel was added by Sir Arthur Blomfield. Blomfield designed the chancel with his vigorous, early, style, simple with no ornament.

In 1899, a bazaar was opened at St Thomas for three days to raise money for the surrounding church's brick wall. St Thomas' bazaar raised £92, the vicar Father R. Wodehouse. The church was repaired in 1928. Four years later in 1932, an enormous baroque altar was erected, and the pulpit and rails arrived from Belgium.

=== 1939-1945 World War II ===
In 1939, during the Second World War, all church bells across Britain were banned from ringing (reserved strictly as a signal for enemy invasion). St Thomas' church bell was damaged by a Nazi bomb in 1941. The church went through post WWII restoration. By the time church members recovered from WWII a new belfry was on the first list priorities.

In 1959, once again the church bell broke its silence for the first time in 20 years. The bell rang out on Easter Sunday at 12.01 am for church services in Godolphin Road.

In 1960, a plan was set for the demolition of St Thomas, but the parishioners fought back and managed to save their cherished Church by convincing the Diocesan Reorganisation Committee to prevent the demolition.

In the same year 1960, St Thomas' church closed its site due to declining local usage. The church building was abundant. In 1962, its Anglican congregation merged with nearby church St Stephen, Uxbridge Road, to create a parish of St Stephen and St Thomas. In 1963, St Thomas' Church was united with St Stephen. All St Thomas' parish records that includes registers of church services, vestry minute book, church Council minute book, Baptisms, marriages were entered formally with St Stephen's.

=== A new opening. ===
In 1965, the Greek Orthodox community bought the lease of St Thomas Church, changed the name to St Nicholas Greek Orthodox and established a permanent home for their community. Opening of the Church (Thyranoixia) was held, allowing the community to celebrate the Divine Liturgy service, Baptism, weddings and funerals. It is within Greek Orthodox tradition that the community wait for years before the church is consecrated

In 1985, the church was consecrated to Cathedral status, serving Greek Orthodox Christians across West London. On Tuesday 22 July 1997, the Very Reverend Archimandrite Anthimos Eleftheriades was shot twice in the head in an Athens street. He was a pillar of St Nicholas Greek Orthodox Church in Shepherd's Bush.

Saint Nicholas of Myra and Bari (1781)

Saint Nicholas of Myra and Bari by W. Brindley 1881.

In 2025, the church celebrated its 60th anniversary marking six decades of sacramental and cultural service since its founding.

== Dedication to St Nicholas ==
On 6 December 2025, the Archbishop Nikitas Lioulias of Thyateria and Great Britain celebrated the feast of Saint Nicholas. He was joined at the altar by several clergy members including the Very Revd Vissarion Kokliotis; Revd Konstantinos Garibaldinos, Vicar General; Revd Pavlos Lambrou; and Revd Andreas Minic, together with Revd George Tsourous and Revd Deacon John Brydges who assisted in the Divine Liturgy.

== Architecture ==
A 19th century church was built by architect Sir Arthur William Blomfield (1829-1899) The church is Grade II Listed building.

=== Exterior ===
The church was built with a classical Victorian Gothic architecture in yellow brick. The church has a traditional Cross, and a bell astride the roof.

=== Interior ===
In 1965, the Greek Orthodox community transformed the Victorian interior layout into a traditional Orthodox design, adorned with icons, including one of St. Nicholas' icon as their patron protector and guardian. The community installed the Iconostasis that separates the main congregation from the altar, creating a unique visual blend of traditional Byzantine icons from Eastern Europe, positioned beneath 150 year old English stained-glass windows.

== The Cathedral and community institute ==
The Cathedral provides educational and spiritual enrichment programs for both parishioners and the wider community.

- Bible Studies
- Byzantine Chanting
- Greek language courses for Beginners, Advanced and Liturgical Greek
- Iconography lessons

Additionally, the Institute hosts film events showings on the lives of saints, featuring movies such as Man of God (depicting the life of St Nicholas) and features on the life and death of St Nicholas.

== See also ==
- Cathedrals dedicated to St Nicholas
- Churches dedicated to St Nicholas
- Eastern Christianity
- Eastern Orthodox Church
- History of Christian theology
- History of Eastern Orthodox theology
- History of the Eastern Orthodox Church
- List of Greek Orthodox patriarchs of Antioch
- Sacred tradition
- Saint Nicholas of Myra saves three innocents from death
- Theological differences between the Catholic Church and Eastern Orthodox Church

== Gallery ==
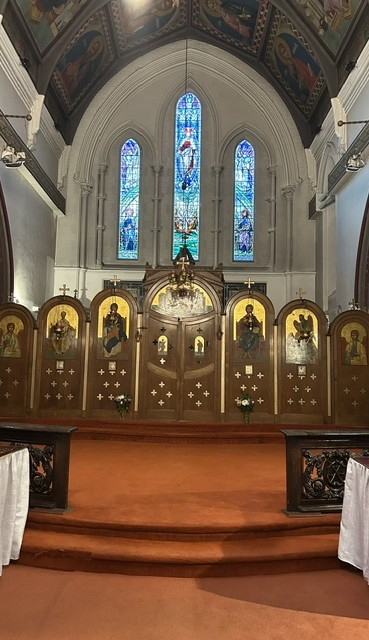
Iconostasis, interior front view of Altar

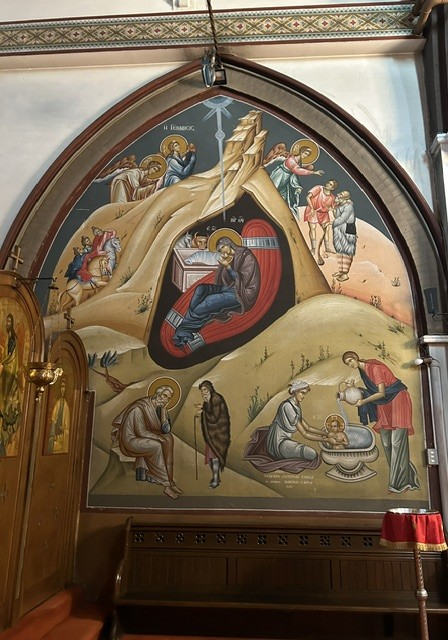
Genesis, the Nativity of Christ

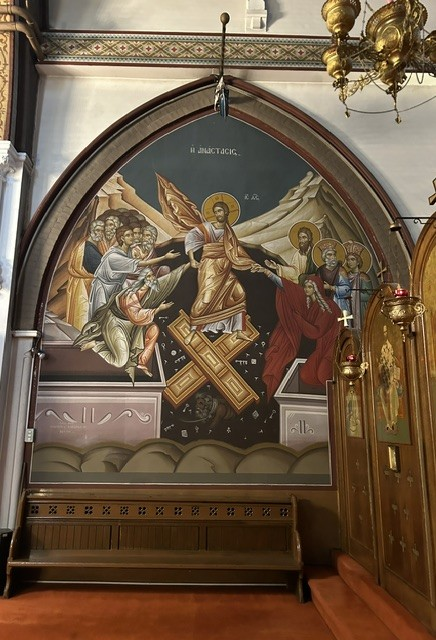
Anastasis, (Resurrection)

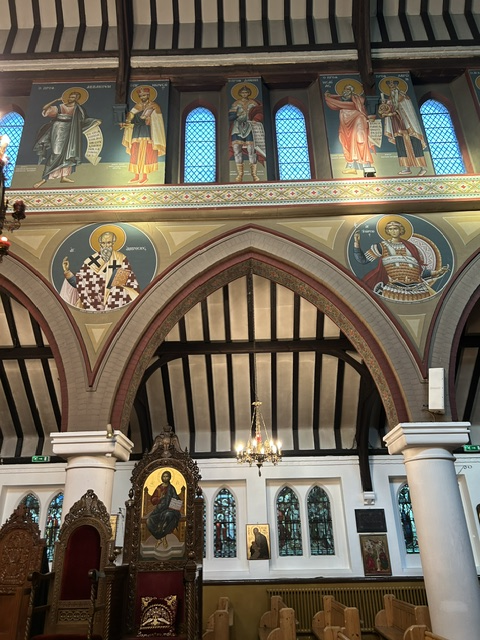
Interior right side view of the nave

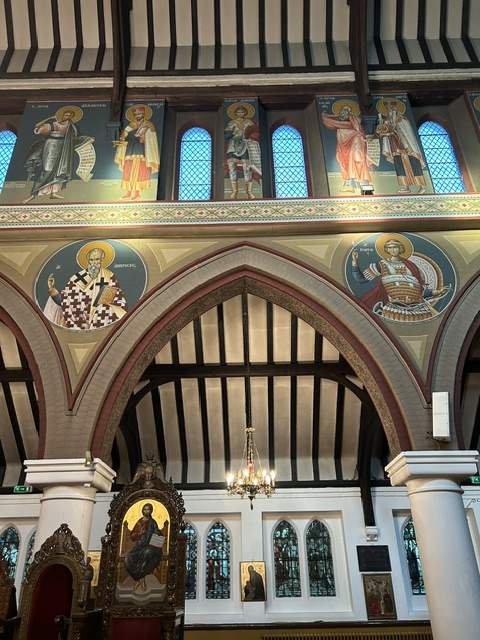
Interior left side view of the nave
