= St. Catherine's Cathedral, Cajamarca =

Coordinates: 7.1566°S 78.5183°W

St. Catherine's Cathedral
- Catedral de Santa Catalina
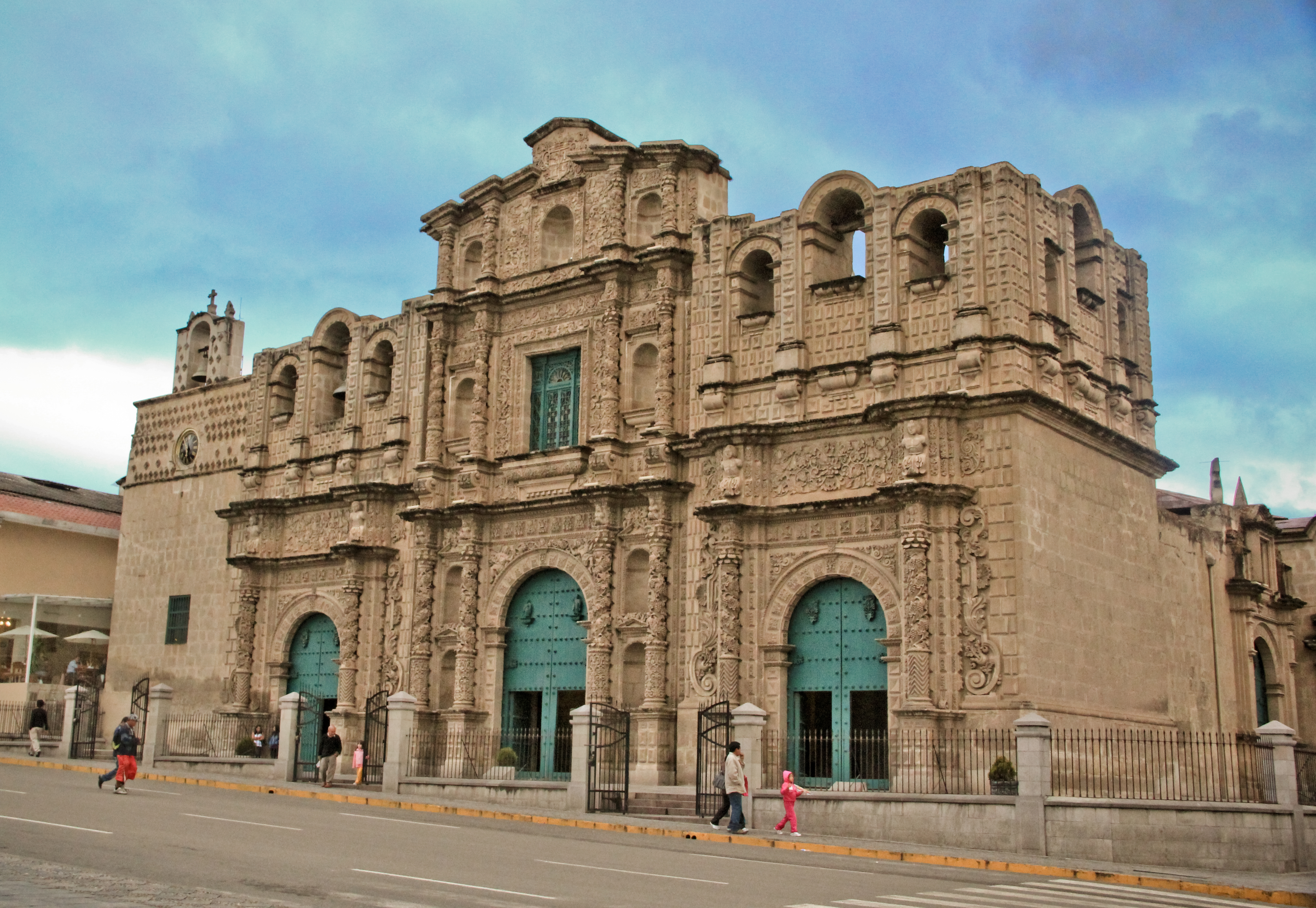
- St. Catherine's Cathedral
- Location: Cajamarca
- Country: Peru
- Denomination: Roman Catholic Church

St. Catherine's Cathedral (Spanish: Catedral de Santa Catalina), also called Cajamarca Cathedral, is the main place of worship of the Catholic Church in the city of Cajamarca in Peru. Built in Baroque style it is owned by the Catholic Diocese of Cajamarca, and was declared Cultural Heritage of the Nation in Peru in 1972.

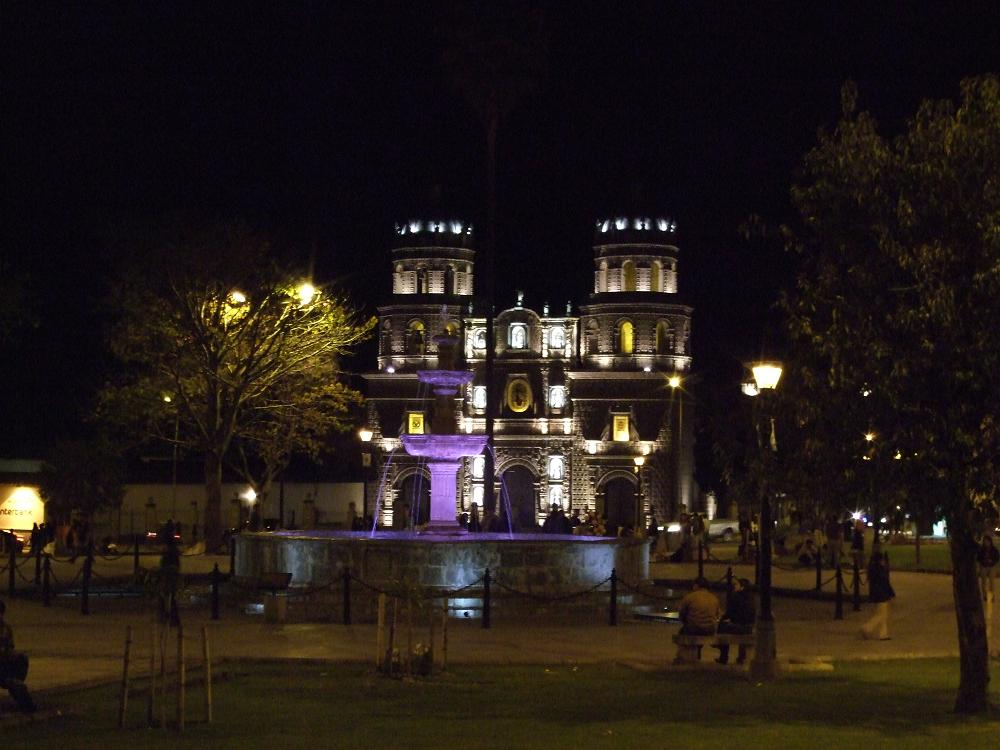
A night-time view

The construction of the current building commenced in the seventeenth century. In the eighteenth century the bells of the cathedral were cast. The church has held the status of a cathedral since 1908.

It is under the pastoral responsibility of the Bishop José Carmelo Martínez Lázaro.

== See also ==
- Roman Catholicism in Peru
- St. Catherine's Church (disambiguation)
