= Cathedral of the Lord of Burgos, Huánuco =

Coordinates: 9.9287°S 76.2396°W

Cathedral of the Lord of Burgos
- Catedral del Señor de Burgos
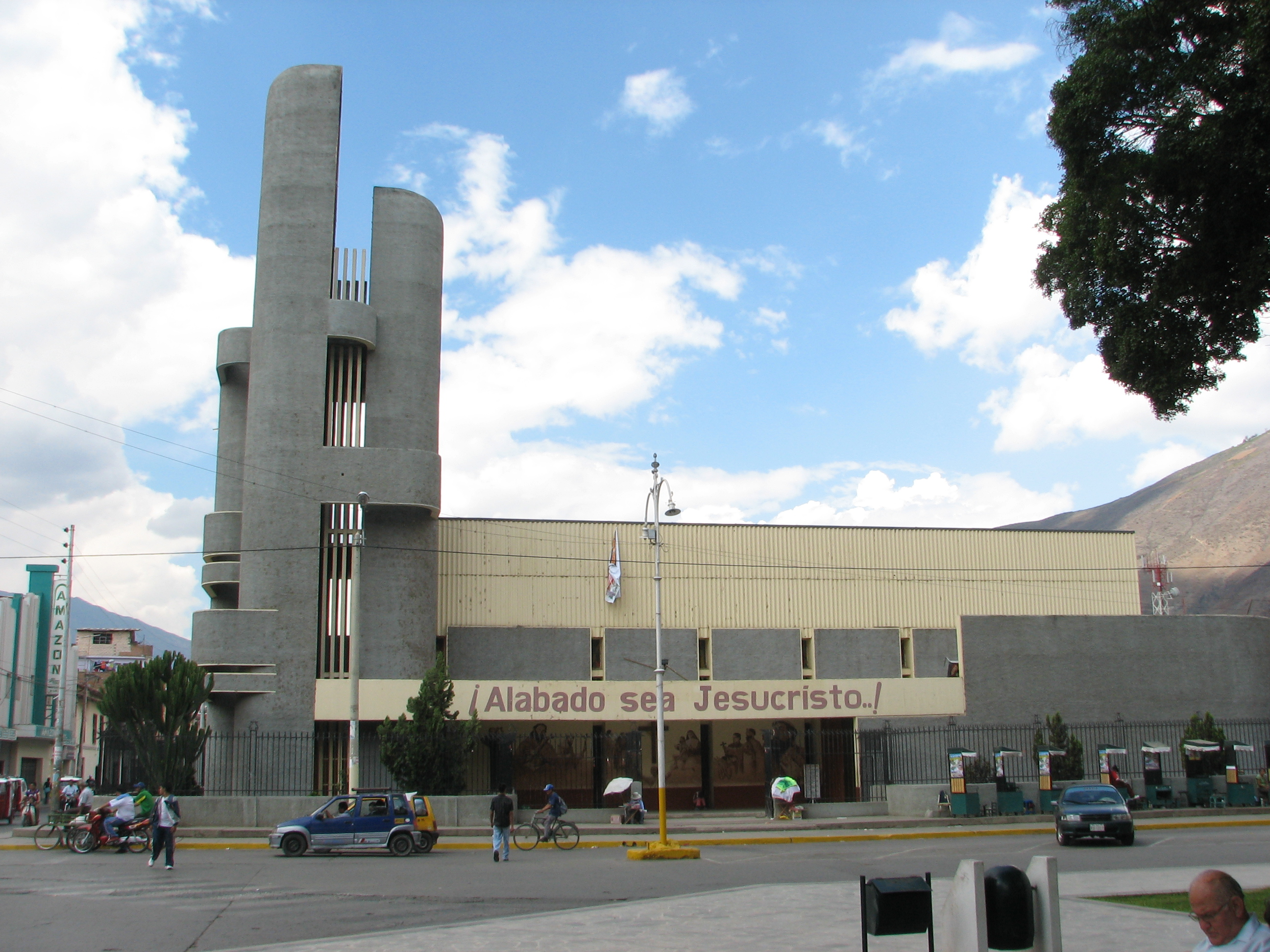
- Cathedral of the Lord of Burgos
- Location: Huánuco
- Country: Peru
- Denomination: Roman Catholic Church

The Cathedral of the Lord of Burgos (Spanish: Catedral del Señor de Burgos) Also Huánuco Cathedral is the name of a religious building affiliated to the Catholic Church located in the city of Huánuco, Peru.

The temple follows the Roman or Latin rite and is the mother church of the Diocese of Huánuco ( Dioecesis Huanucensis ) which was created in 1865 by the bull Singulari animi Nostri of Pope Pius IX. The original building was built in 1618. In 1965 it was demolished. The new cathedral was built by the German architect Kuno.

It is under the pastoral responsibility of Bishop Neri Menor Vargas.

== See also ==
- Roman Catholicism in Peru
- Burgos Cathedral
