= St. Anthony Cathedral, Huancavelica =

Coordinates: 12.7878°S 74.9731°W

St. Anthony Cathedral
- Catedral de San Antonio
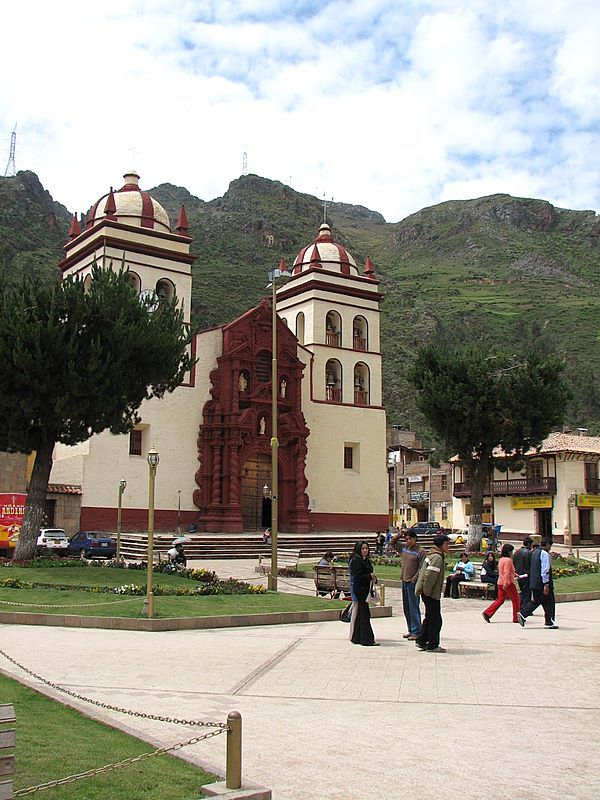
- St. Anthony Cathedral
- Location: Huancavelica
- Country: Peru
- Denomination: Roman Catholic Church

History
- Dedication: St. Anthony of Padua

Architecture
- Style: Churrigueresque

Administration
- Diocese: Roman Catholic Diocese of Huancavelica

The St. Anthony Cathedral (also Huancavelica Cathedral; Spanish: Catedral de San Antonio) is the main Catholic church in Huancavelica, a city in the South American country of Peru. It was constructed between the 16th and 17th centuries and was initially built by the Tonsurados. The predominant architectural style is Churrigueresque Baroque.

The Cathedral of San Antonio de Huancavelica is located in front of the Plaza de Armas, in the center of the town of Huancavelica, belonging to the department of the same name.

This cathedral was formerly known as the Mother Church of San Antonio. Construction was begun by the Tonsurados and finished in July 1608; however, the retablos, canvases, pulpits and other decorations and finishes, continued to be worked on and perfected during the following decades.

== See also ==
- Roman Catholicism in Peru

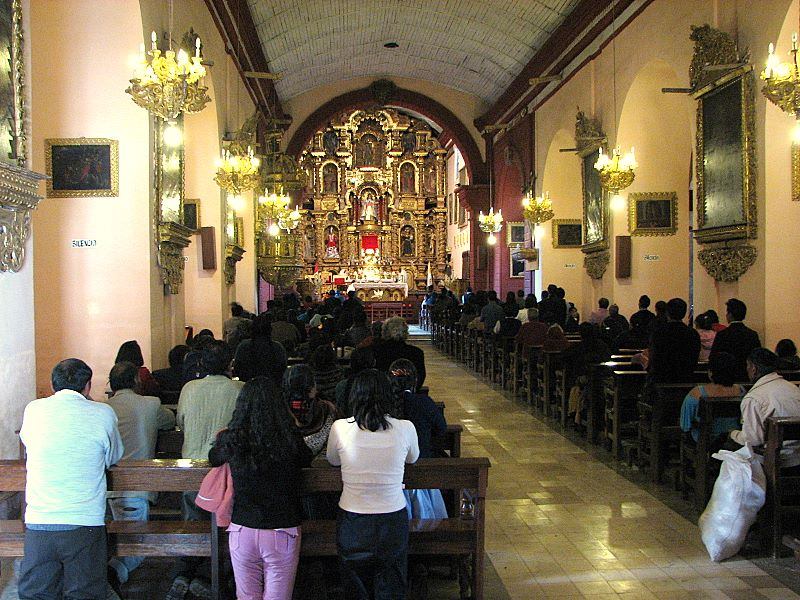
Internal view
