= Virgin of the Rosary Cathedral, Abancay =

Virgin of the Rosary Cathedral
- Catedral de la Virgen del Rosario
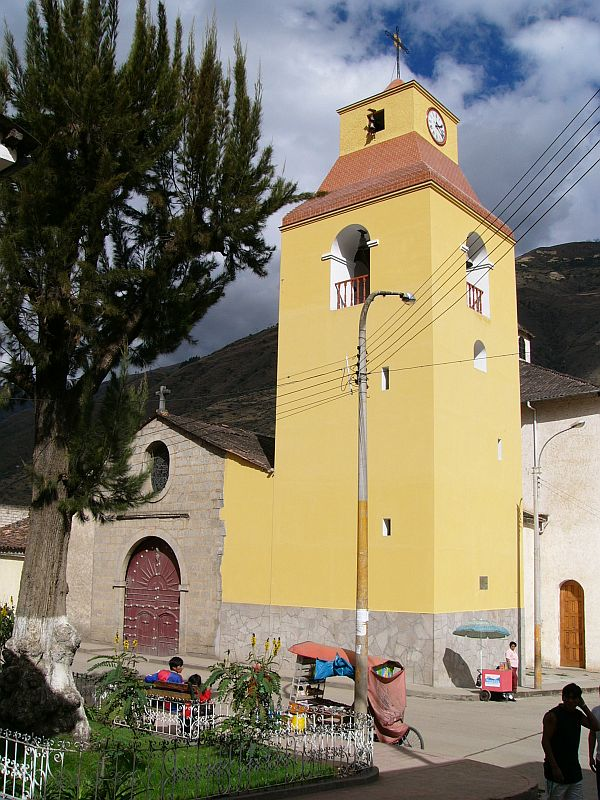
- Virgin of the Rosary Cathedral
- Location: Abancay
- Country: Peru
- Denomination: Roman Catholic Church

The Virgin of the Rosary Cathedral (Spanish: Catedral de la Virgen del Rosario) also called Abancay Cathedral is the name that receives a religious building that is affiliated with the Catholic Church and is located in the city of Abancay in the Department of Apurímac southeast of the South American country of Peru.

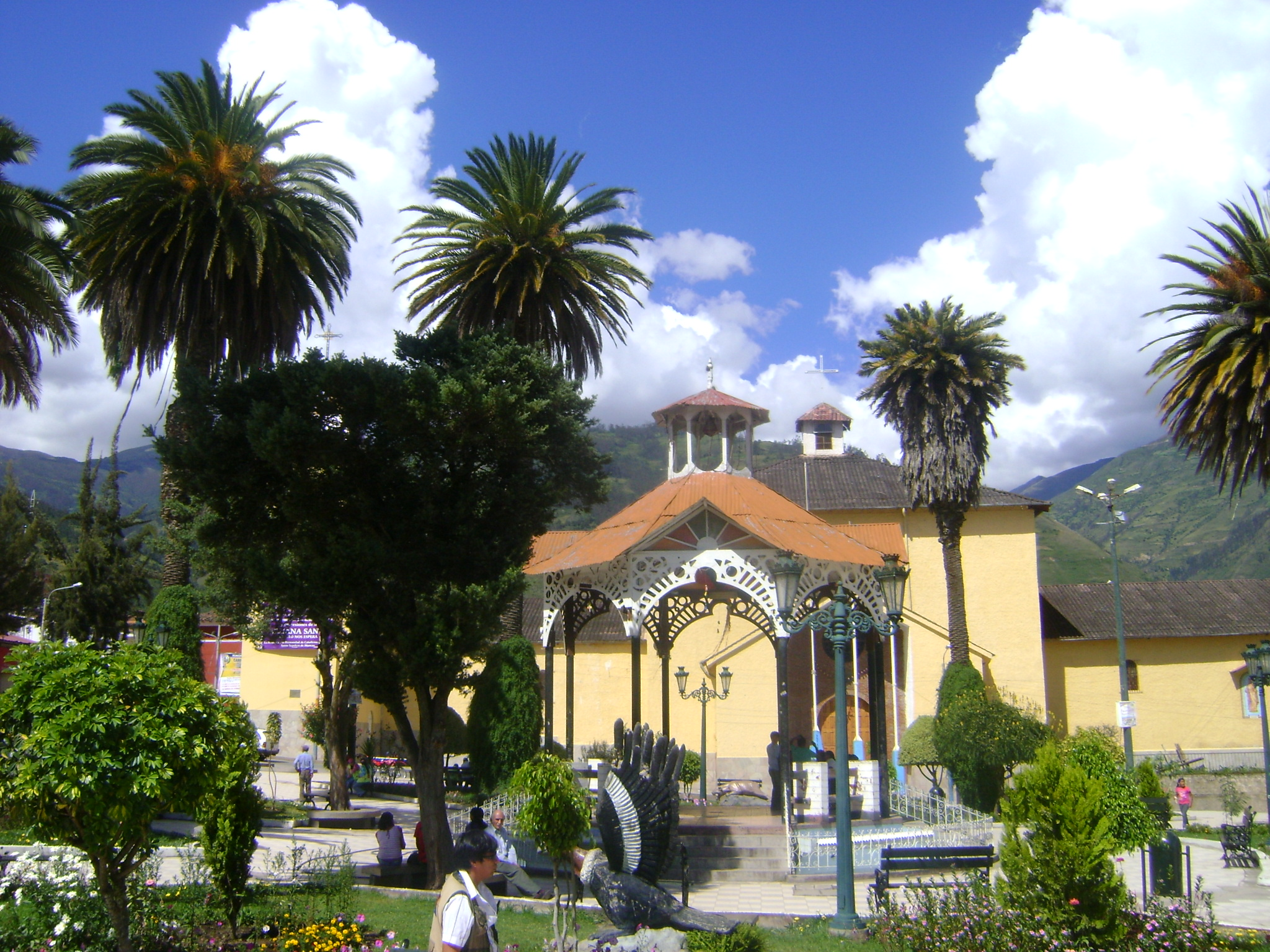
Another view

The building probably began to be built in the year 1645, during the time when the territory was a Spanish colony. The construction has undergone modifications in its structure and parts several times. The cathedral is characterized by simple architecture, has a single tower with a belfry. In 1970 the current building was completely remodeled. In October of each year are celebrated the feasts in honor to the Virgin Mary in its invocation of the Rosary.-

It is under the pastoral responsibility of Bishop Gilberto Gómez González.

== See also ==
- Roman Catholicism in Peru
- Virgin of the Rosary
