= Cathedral Basilica of St. Charles Borromeo, Puno =

Church in Puno, Peru

Coordinates: 15°50′28″S 70°01′45″W

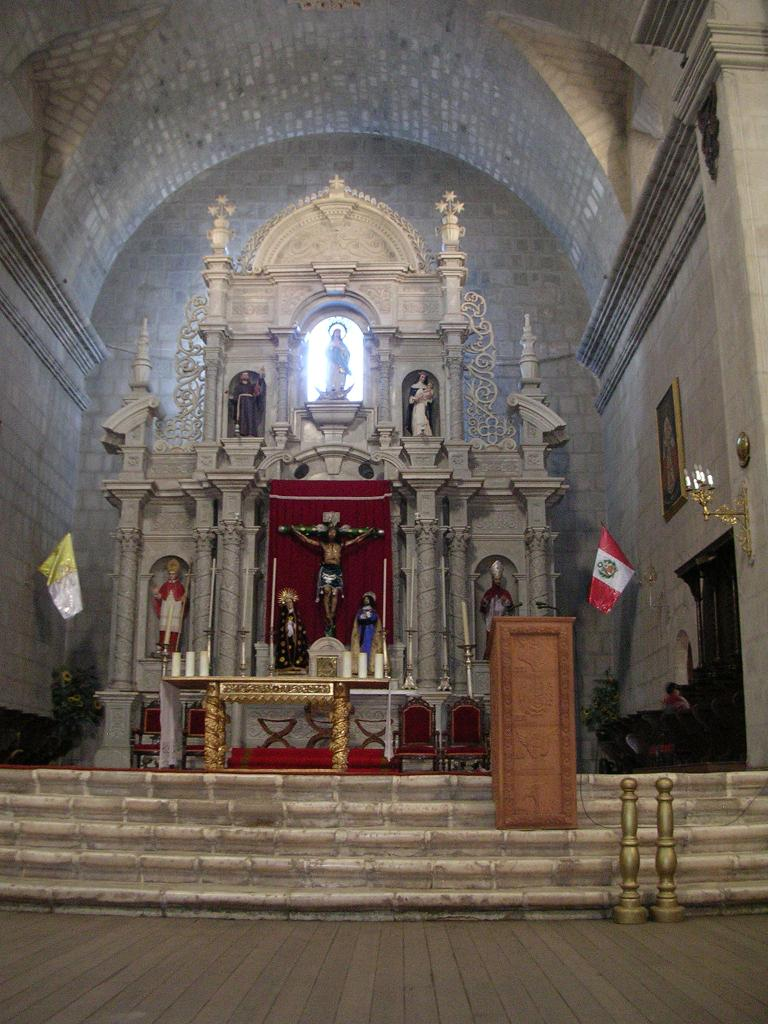
Interior view of the cathedral

The Catedral Basílica San Carlos Borromeo or Puno Cathedral is a Catholic church in the city of Puno in south-eastern Peru. It is in the Andean Baroque architectural tradition, and is the seat of the Roman Catholic Diocese of Puno. The priest of the church is Father Carlos Miguel Mestanza Mainetto.

The church was built in 1757.
