= St. James Cathedral, Moyobamba =

Coordinates: 12.0465°S 77.0300°W

St. James Cathedral
- Catedral de Santiago
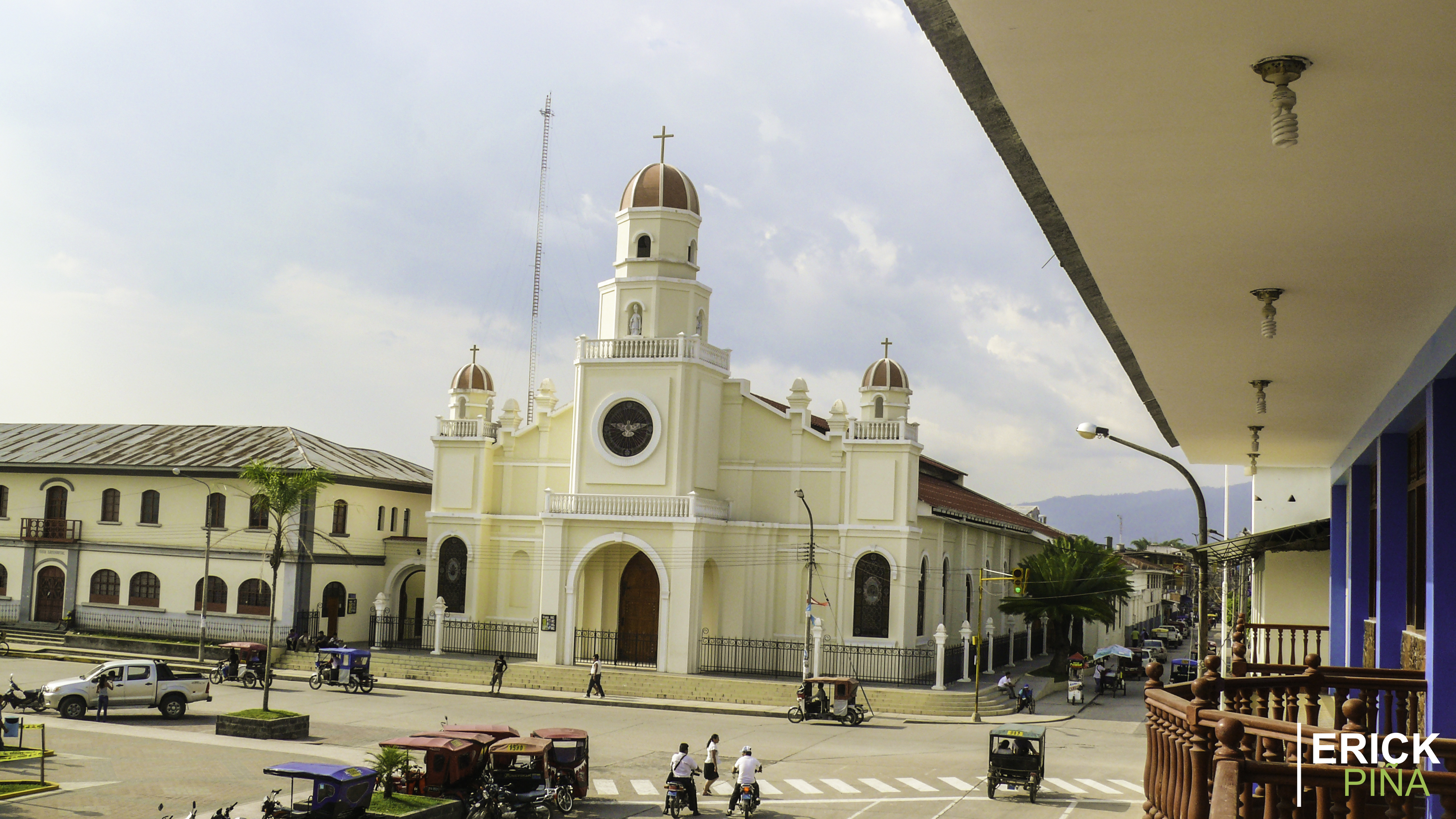
- St. James Cathedral
- Location: Moyobamba
- Country: Peru
- Denomination: Catholic Church

The Cathedral of St. James (Spanish: Catedral de Santiago), also known simply as Moyobamba Cathedral after the city in which it is located, is the main church of the Roman Catholic Territorial Prelature of Moyobamba and of the Department of San Martín.

The cathedral occupies the north side of the Moyobamba Plaza de Armas, in Jirón Callao, on the corner of Pedro Canga. It formerly occupied the north-east side of the square, but was relocated after the city was struck by an earthquake. A monument dedicated to the Sacred Heart of Jesus was erected on the site of the old cathedral.

== See also ==
- Catholic Church in Peru
