= Basilica of Saint Nicholas, Nantes =

Basilica church in France

Coordinates: 47°12′56″N 1°33′28″W

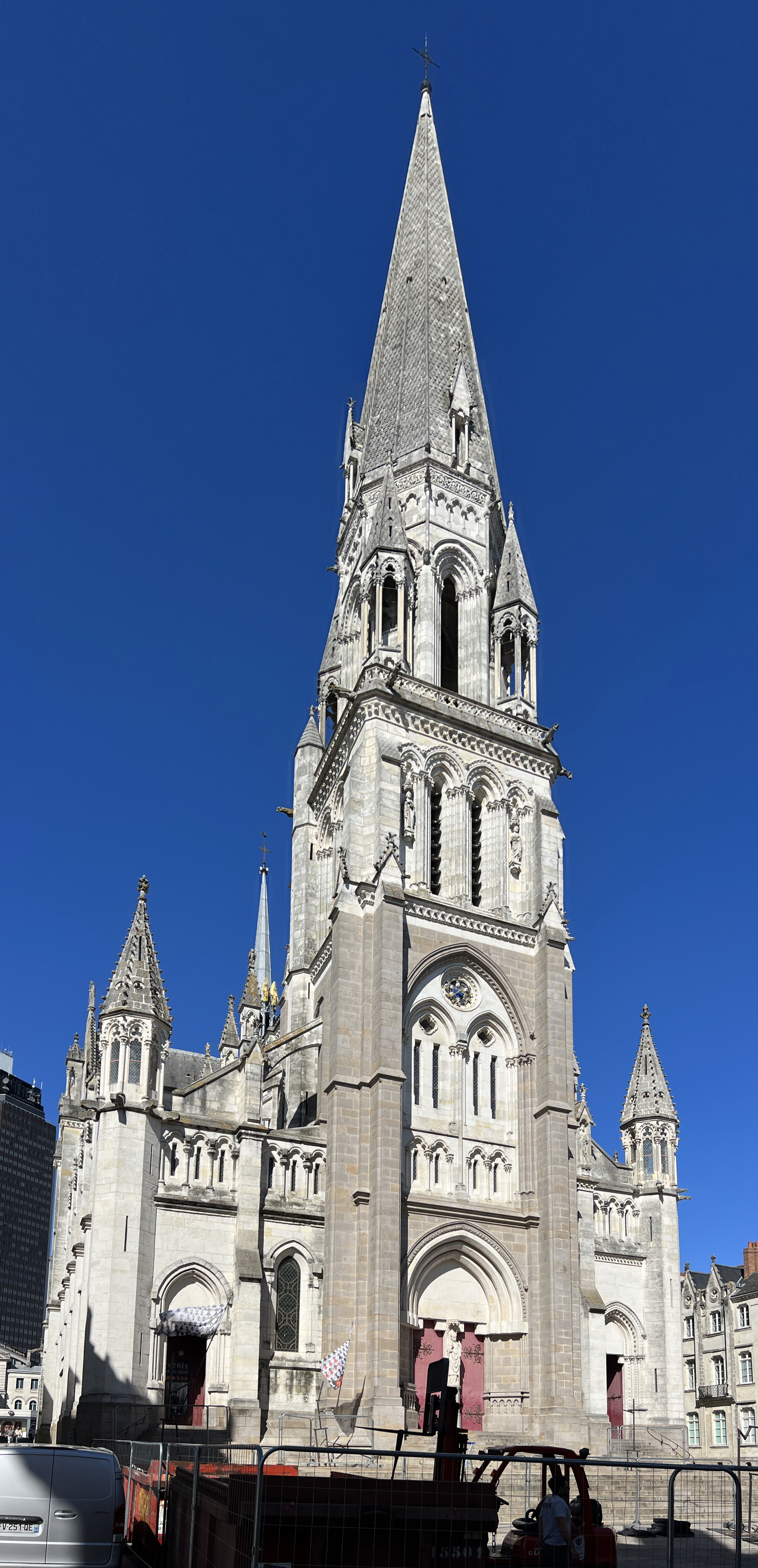
South front of the basilica

The Basilica of Saint Nicholas (French: Basilique Saint-Nicolas de Nantes) is a minor basilica in Nantes, Loire-Atlantique, historically in Brittany. The present church is a Gothic Revival structure built during the years 1844 to 1869 on the site of a medieval parish church largely rebuilt in the late 18th century. Because of the constrained site in the centre of the old city, the church is oriented north-south rather than the traditional east-west. The building was severely damaged in World War II in the Allied bombardment of 16 September 1943. Structural repairs were not completed until 1978. It was declared a minor basilica by Pope Leo XIII on 26 October 1882.

The Gothic Revival furnishings were registered as a monument historique on 20 November 1985, the church itself on 6 November 1986.
