= St. Nicholas Cathedral, Tumbes =

Coordinates: 3.5701°S 80.4615°W

St. Nicholas Cathedral
- Catedral de San Nicolás
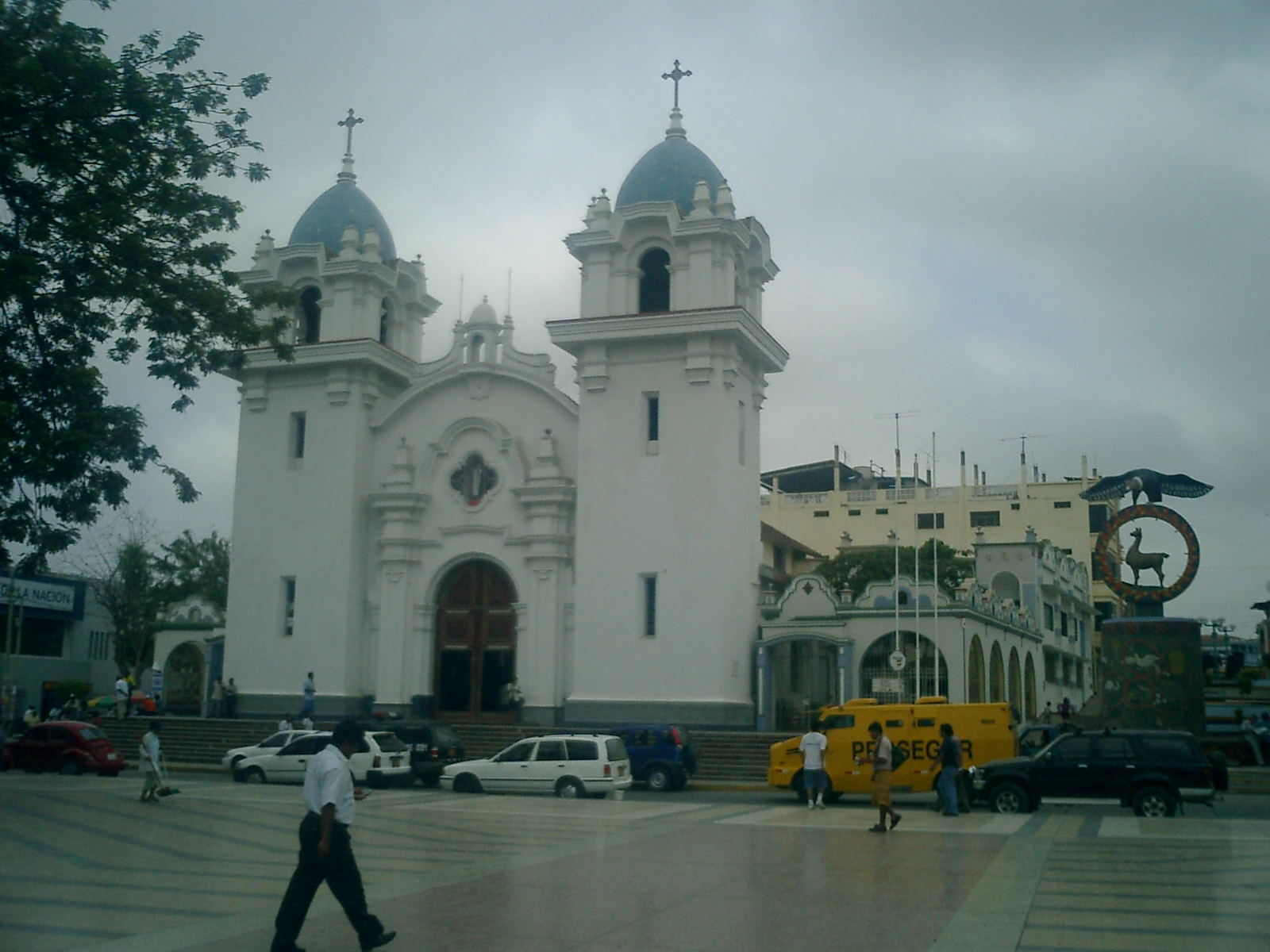
- St. Nicholas Cathedral
- Location: Tumbes
- Country: Peru
- Denomination: Roman Catholic Church

Architecture
- Architectural type: church

The St. Nicholas Cathedral (Spanish: Catedral de San Nicolás ) also called Tumbes Cathedral Or Church of San Nicolás de Tolentino is the name that receives a temple affiliated and property of the Catholic Church located in the locality of Tumbes in the department of the same name to the north of the South American country of Peru.

It is located specifically in the main square of Tumbes. It was built by the Augustinian priests in the 17th century, when the country was still under the control of the Spanish Empire in Baroque style.

It was completely restored in 1985.

== See also ==
- Roman Catholicism in Peru
