= Annia =

Annia may refer to:

- Annia gens, an ancient Roman clan
- Any Roman woman of the gens (see for list), including:
  - Paculla Annia, a priestess involved in the suppression of the Bacchanalia in 186 BC
- Via Annia, a Roman road in Cisalpine Gaul named for a member of the gens Annia
- Annia (insect), a disused synonym for a genus of praying mantises

== See also ==
- Annius (disambiguation)
- Anna (disambiguation)
- Annaea gens
- Anneia
