= Raphaël Nguyễn Văn Diệp =

His Excellency Raphael Nguyễn Văn Diệp
- Coadjutor Bishop of Vĩnh Long
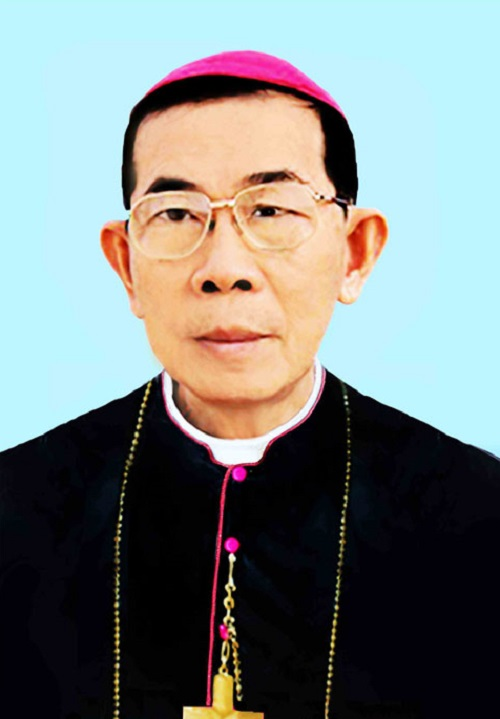
- Church: Catholic
- Province: Hồ Chí Minh City
- Diocese: Vĩnh Long
- Appointed: 15 August 1975
- Term ended: 27 May 2000
- Other post: Titular Bishop of Tubusuptu (1975–2007)

Orders
- Ordination: 7 December 1954
- Consecration: 15 August 1975 by Jacques Nguyễn Văn Mầu

Personal details
- Born: 20 October 1926 Bến Tre, French Indochina
- Died: 20 December 2007 (aged 81) Hồ Chí Minh City, Việt Nam
- Motto: Vigilate et orate (Watch and pray)

Raphael Nguyễn Văn Diệp (20 October 1926 – 20 December 2007) was a Vietnamese Catholic bishop who was the coadjutor bishop of Vĩnh Long from 1975 until 2000.

== Biography ==
Nguyễn Văn Diệp was born in Long Thôi, Bến Tre, French Indochina on 20 October 1926.

He was ordained a priest on 7 December 1954.

=== Episcopate ===
He was appointed titular bishop of Tubusuptu and coadjutor bishop of Vĩnh Long by Pope Paul VI. The appointment of a coadjutor bishop was due to the then-difficult and unstable political situation in Vietnam. He received his episcopal consecration from Bishop Jacques Nguyễn Văn Mầu, on the same day of his appointment, 15 August 1975. Despite initial fears from the government, he never took over as bishop of the diocese. He continued serving the community as coadjutor bishop until 27 May 2000, when he retired due to reaching the age limit. After his retirement, he resided with the Congregation of the Mother Co-Redemtprix in Thủ Đức.

=== Death and burial ===
He died at the Nguyễn Tri Phương Hospital in Hồ Chí Minh City on 20 December 2007, aged 81. The Congregation, through its superior, Jean Maria Ðoàn Phú Xuân, made an agreement with Bishop Thomas Nguyễn Văn Tân for Diệp to have his Requiem Mass and burial at the Vĩnh Long Cathedral. However, Xuân later broke the agreement, assuring that the diocese should not worry about any of the funeral preparations because Diệp was no longer a part of the diocese, and also to fulfill his last wish to be buried with the Congregation. Despite this, Diệp had his funeral Mass and burial done at the Vĩnh Long Cathedral on 24 December 2007.
