= Servenia gens =

Ancient Roman family

The gens Servenia was a minor plebeian family at ancient Rome. No members of this gens are mentioned in ancient writers, but a number are known from inscriptions, dating from the late Republic to the third century. At least some of the Servenii attained senatorial rank under the early Empire. None of them appear to have held the consulship, but Lucius Servenius Cornutus was praetor, and an important provincial governor under the Flavian dynasty.

== Origin ==
The nomen Servenius gives few indications of the family's origin. It seems to belong to a class of gentilicia formed with suffixes that never became widespread, or came to be regarded as regular gentile-forming suffixes. The geographical distribution of the earliest Servenii may be more useful. They came from a small region of Umbria, as attested by inscriptions from Hispellum, Asisium, and Fulginiae, strong evidence that the family was of Umbrian origin.

== Praenomina ==
The Servenii used a variety of common praenomina, chiefly Lucius, Gaius, and Marcus, the most common names throughout Roman history. Less frequently, they used other common names, such as Publius, Quintus, Sextus, and Gnaeus, the last of which is only found among the earliest Servenii. In another early inscription, one of the Servenii bears the rare praenomen Rufus.

== Branches and cognomina ==
Like many other gentes that came to prominence in imperial times, the Servenii cannot be clearly divided into distinct families, unless the Servenii of Acmonia in Asia constituted a single family. They bore cognomina such as Capito, originally a nickname for someone with a large or prominent head, and Cornutus, an old surname probably referring to callous or horny skin. For a relatively obscure gens, the Servenii were particularly widespread, colonizing not only various parts of Italy, but also Britannia, Gaul, Spain, Pannonia, Dalmatia, Asia, and Africa.

== Members ==
This list includes abbreviated praenomina. For an explanation of this practice, see filiation.

- Rufus Servenius Sex. f. Provincialis, buried at Hispellum in Umbria during the first century BC.
- Gaius Servenius C. f., buried at Hispellum in the latter half of the first century BC.
- Gaius Servenius Cn. f., buried at Asisium in Umbria, during the reign of Augustus.
- Servenius Ɔ. l. Chilo, a freedman, and caretaker of the artwork at the temple of Minerva at Hispellum during the reign of Augustus.
- Gaius Servenius Cn. f. Clemens, buried at Asisium in the early part of the first century.
- Lucius Servenius L. l. Daedalus, a freedman buried at Rome in the first half of the first century.
- Lucius Servenius Gallus, praetor in AD 62, named in two inscriptions from Herculaneum in Campania.
- Servenius Capito, Archon of Acmonia in Asia in the time of Nero. His wife was Julia Severa, and they may have been the parents of Lucius Servenius Cornutus, who seems to have come from Acmonia.
- Lucius Servenius L. f. Cornutus, a native of Acmonia, and perhaps the son of Servenius Capito and Julia Severa, filled a number of appointments and magistracies during the time of the Flavian emperors, serving as decemvir stlitibus judicandis, quaestor in Cyprus, aedile, praetor, and governor of Asia.
- Servenia Cornuta Cornelia Calpurnia Valeria Secunda Cotia Procilla Luculla, a native of Galatia, and the wife of Publius Calpurnius Proculus Cornelianus, a Roman senator.
- Servenius Jucundus, dedicated a tomb at Rome, dating to the first century or the early part of the second, for his wife, Gellia Vestina.
- Quintus Servenius Primus, a magistrate at Vaga in Africa Proconsularis in AD 155, presided over an offering to Saturn, performed by the priest Marcus Gargilius Zabo on the fourth day (Note: The Ides of November fell on the thirteenth. Since they represented the full moon on the old lunar calendar, the first day before the Ides was the day before moonrise—the same day by modern reckoning. The fourth day before the Ides of November fell on November 10, the beginning of winter, according to Varro.) before the Ides of November.
- Marcus Servenius Punicus, buried at an uncertain location in Dalmatia, with a monument from his son, Marcus Servenius Doctus, dating to the first century, or the first half of the second.
- Marcus Servenius M. f. Doctus, dedicated a first- or second-century monument in Dalmatia to his father, Marcus Servenius Punicus.
- Servenia Paulina, buried at Valentia in Hispania Citerior, in a tomb dedicated by her husband, Lucius Publicius Glycerus, dating to the second century.
- Servenius Urio, dedicated a tomb at Aquincum in Pannonia Inferior, dating to the latter half of the second century, to his wife, Antistia Firma, aged twenty-five.
- Servenia Marcella, the widow of Gaius Flavius, was buried at Doclea in Dalmatia in the second or third century, with a monument from her daughter, Flavia Prisca.
- Servenius Proculus, a soldier in the first cohort of the Vigiles at Rome in AD 205, serving in the century of Iuvenis.

=== Undated Servenii ===
- Gaius Servenius, one of the duumviri jure dicundo at Fulginiae in Umbria.
- Sextus Servenius, buried at Nemausus in Gallia Narbonensis, in a tomb dedicated by his sister, Posilla.
- Marcus Servenius Alexander, one of the Sodales of the deified Claudius at Beneventum in Samnium, where he was buried, aged ninety-seven years, two months, and twelve days, along with his wife, Junia Capriola.
- Gaius Servenius Artemidorus, dedicated a tomb at Rome to Valeria Philippina, his wife of six years.
- Marcus Servenius M. f. Felix, buried at Thibilis in Numidia, aged eighty-nine.
- Quintus Servenius Fucianus, named in an inscription from Narbo in Gallia Narbonensis.
- Sextus Servenius Gemellus, buried at Ammaedara in Africa Proconsularis, aged seventy-eight, with a monument dedicated by his son. Caelia Nina, buried in the same tomb, aged ninety, may have been his wife.
- Publius Servenius Ɔ. l. Philocles, a freedman named in an inscription from Cures, along with Publius Servenius Philogenes, probably his freedman, and the freedwoman Tullia Hilara.
- Publius Servenius P. l. Philogenes, probably the freedman of Publius Servenius Philocles, alongside whom he is mentioned in an inscription from Cures.
- (Servenia) Sex. f. Posilla, dedicated a tomb at Nemausus to her brother, Sextus Servenius.
- Publius Servenius Sp. f. Proculus, built a family sepulchre at Iader in Dalmatia, from the funds inherited from his mother, Tritua. Among those buried were his son, Publius Servenius Proculus, and Trebia Optata, a freedwoman, and perhaps his wife.
- Publius Servenius P. f. Proculus, the son of Publius Servenius Proculus, buried in a family sepulchre built by his father at Iader.
- Gaius Servenius Racilianus, buried at Ugultunia in Hispania Baetica, aged twenty-two.
- Gaius Servenius Racilianus, buried at Baeturia in Hispania Baetica, aged two.
- Lucius Servenius L. l. Seleucus, a freedman buried at Narbo, along with his wife, the freedwoman Munatia Benigna.
- Lucius Servenius Super, named in an inscription from Derventio Brigantum in Britannia.

== See also ==
- List of Roman gentes

== Bibliography ==
- Theodor Mommsen et alii, Corpus Inscriptionum Latinarum (The Body of Latin Inscriptions, abbreviated CIL), Berlin-Brandenburgische Akademie der Wissenschaften (1853–present).
- Wilhelm Henzen, Ephemeris Epigraphica: Corporis Inscriptionum Latinarum Supplementum (Journal of Inscriptions: Supplement to the Corpus Inscriptionum Latinarum, abbreviated EE), Institute of Roman Archaeology, Rome (1872–1913).
- Gustav Wilmanns, Inscriptiones Africae Latinae (Latin Inscriptions from Africa, abbreviated ILAfr), Georg Reimer, Berlin (1881).
- René Cagnat et alii, L'Année épigraphique (The Year in Epigraphy, abbreviated AE), Presses Universitaires de France (1888–present).
- George Davis Chase, "The Origin of Roman Praenomina", in Harvard Studies in Classical Philology, vol. VIII, pp. 103–184 (1897).
- Paul von Rohden, Elimar Klebs, & Hermann Dessau, Prosopographia Imperii Romani (The Prosopography of the Roman Empire, abbreviated PIR), Berlin (1898).
- Veikko Väänänen, Le iscrizioni della necropoli dell'autoparco Vaticano (Inscriptions of the Vatican Autopark Necropolis), G. Bardi, Rome (1973).
- The Roman Inscriptions of Britain (abbreviated RIB), Oxford, (1990–present).
- John C. Traupman, The New College Latin & English Dictionary, Bantam Books, New York (1995).
