= Antoine Nguyễn Văn Thiện =

Vietnamese Roman Catholic bishop (1906–2012)

The Most Reverend Antoine Nguyễn Văn Thiện
- Bishop of Vĩnh Long
- Church: Catholic
- Province: Sài Gòn
- See: Vĩnh Long
- Appointed: 24 November 1960
- Installed: 3 April 1961
- Term ended: 12 July 1968
- Predecessor: Pierre Martin Ngô Đình Thục (as Vicar Apostolic)
- Successor: Jacques Nguyễn Văn Mầu

Orders
- Ordination: 21 February 1932
- Consecration: 22 January 1961 by Pierre Martin Ngô Đình Thục

Personal details
- Born: 13 March 1906 Cái Cồn, Sóc Trăng province, French Cochinchina
- Died: 13 May 2012 (aged 106) Nice, France
- Motto: Opere et Veritate (Practice and Truth)

Antoine Nguyễn Văn Thiện (13 March 1906 – 13 May 2012) was a Vietnamese Roman Catholic bishop and the oldest of the Catholic Church at 106 years of age. He was also one of the last living bishops to have served in South Vietnam.

== Biography ==
Born in Cái Cồn, in the Sóc Trăng province of French Cochinchina, Thiện was ordained a priest on 20 February 1932. He was appointed the bishop of Vĩnh Long in November 1960 and received episcopal consecration in January 1961. He resigned that position in 1968 and was appointed a titular bishop of Hispellum the same month. He became the oldest living Roman Catholic bishop on 6 October 2005, with the death of Bishop Ettore Cunial at age 99.

Thiện died in Nice, France, on 13 May 2012, at the age of 106. France's Géry Leuliet then became the oldest living Catholic bishop.

== Sources ==
- "Bishop saved from rebels", Spokane Daily Chronicle, 9 November 1961
