= Diocese of Vĩnh Long =

Roman Catholic diocese in Vietnam

Diocese of Vinh Long Dioecesis Vinhlongensis Giáo phận Vĩnh Long
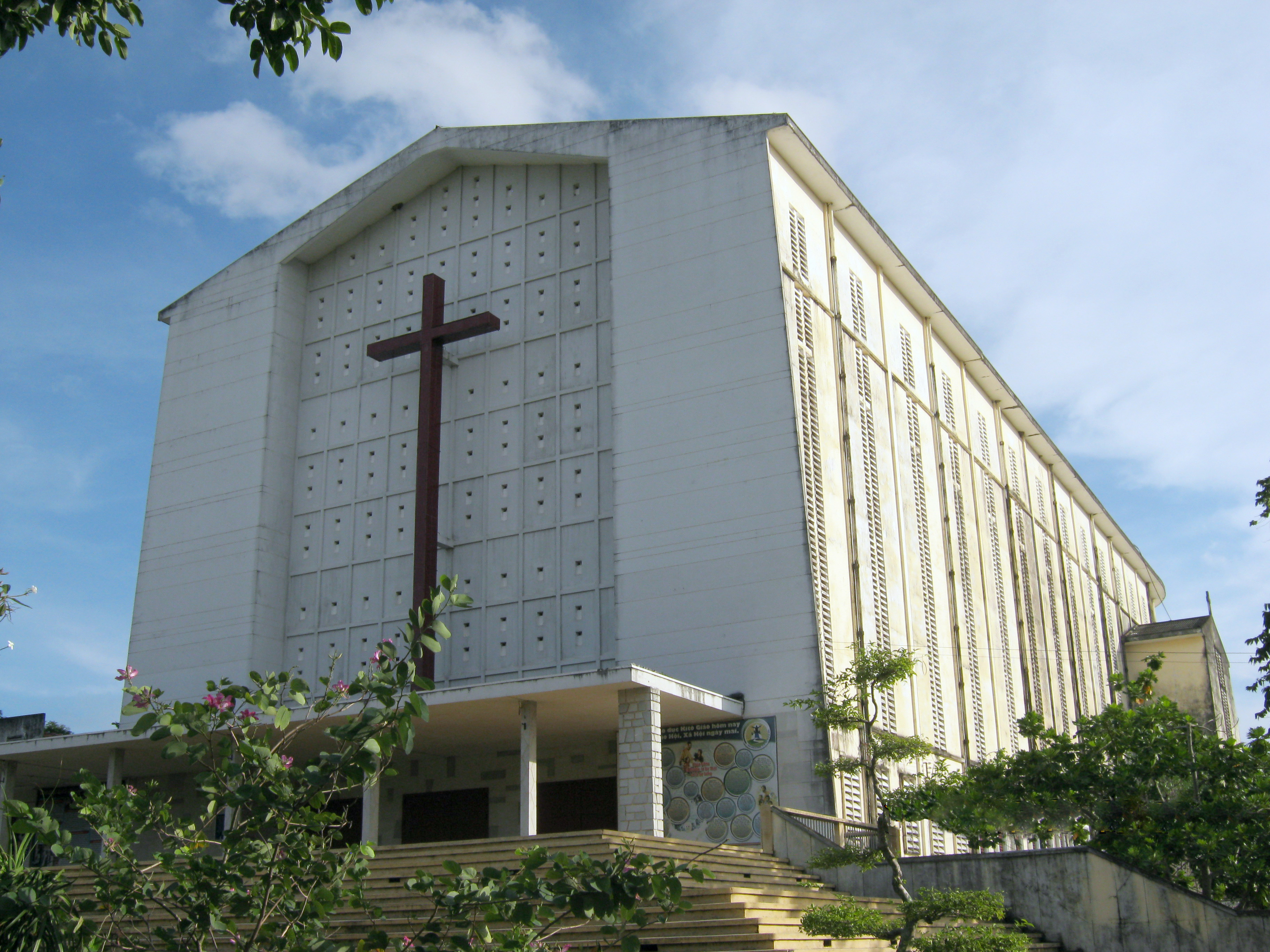
- Saint Anne Cathedral of Vĩnh Long

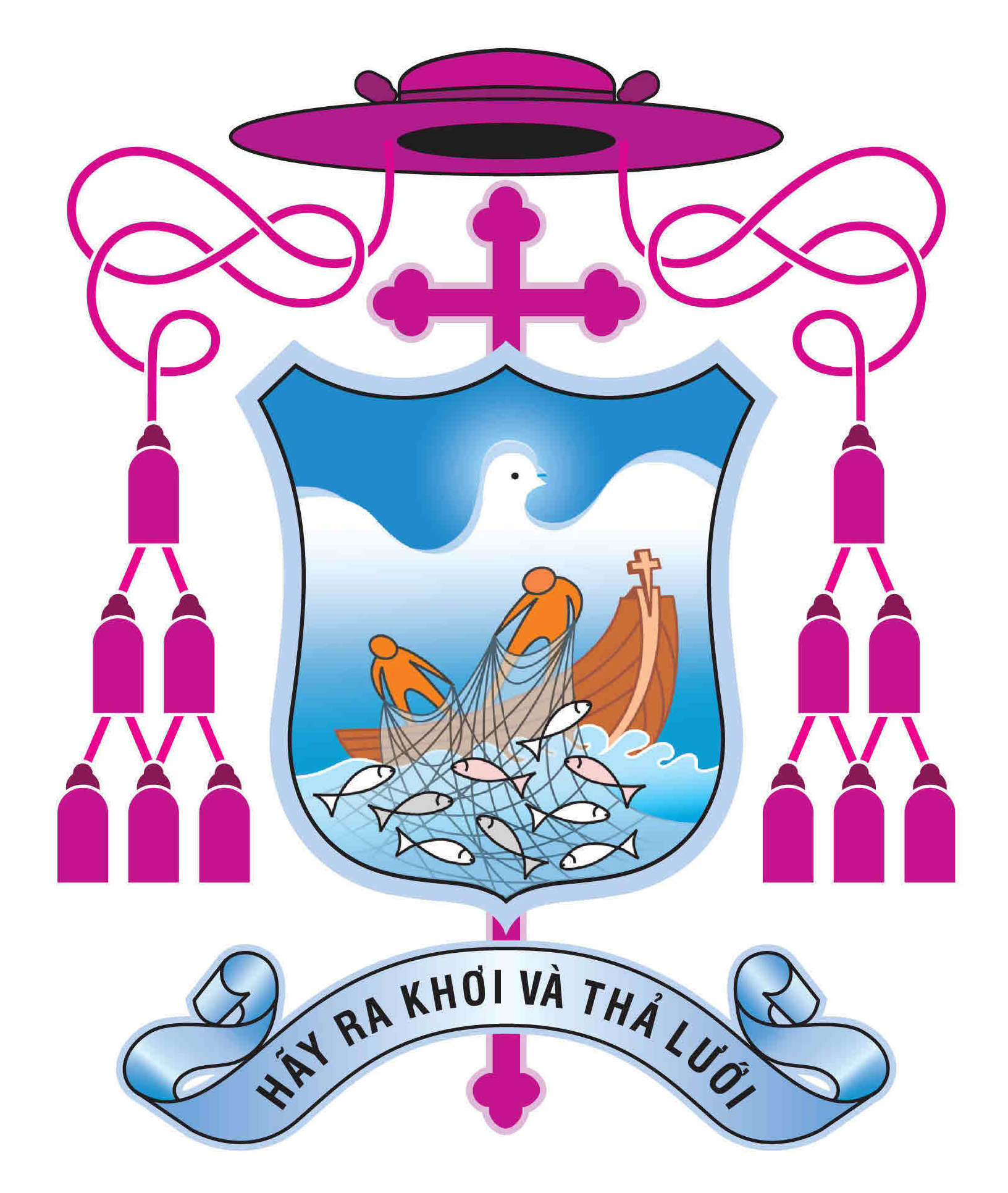
- Coat of arms of Bishop Peter Huỳnh Văn Hai

Location
- Country: Vietnam
- Ecclesiastical province: Hồ Chi Minh City

Statistics
- Area: 6,772 km^{2} (2,615 sq mi)
- Population: Total; Catholics: (as of 2014); 4,385,000; 199,404 (4.5%)
- Parishes: 209

Information
- Denomination: Roman Catholic
- Sui iuris church: Latin Church
- Rite: Roman Rite
- Cathedral: Cathedral of St Anne in Vĩnh Long
- Patron saint: St Philip Phan Văn Minh

Current leadership
- Pope: Leo XIV
- Bishop: Peter Huỳnh Văn Hai
- Metropolitan Archbishop: Joseph Nguyễn Năng

Website
- giaophanvinhlong.net

The Diocese of Vĩnh Long (Latin: Dioecesis Vinhlongensis) is a Roman Catholic diocese in southern Vietnam. The current bishop is Peter Huỳnh Văn Hai, since October 2015.

The creation of the diocese in present form was declared November 24, 1960.

The diocese covers an area of 6,772 km², and is a suffragan diocese of the Archdiocese of Ho Chi Minh City.

By 2014, the diocese of Vĩnh Long had about 199,404 Catholics (4.5% of the population), 179 priests and 209 parishes.

St. Anne’s Cathedral in Vĩnh Long town has been assigned as the Cathedral of the diocese.

== Ordinaries ==
=== Vicar Apostolic of Vĩnh Long ===
- Pierre-Martin Ngô Đình Thục (8 Jan 1938 - 24 Nov 1960), appointed Archbishop of Huế

=== Bishops of Vĩnh Long ===
1. Antoine Nguyễn Văn Thiện (24 November 1960 - 12 July 1968), appointed Titular Bishop of Hispellum
2. Jacques Nguyễn Văn Mầu (12 July 1968 - 3 July 2001)
3. Thomas Nguyễn Văn Tân (3 July 2001 - 17 August 2013)
4. Peter Huỳnh Văn Hai (7 October 2015 - present)

=== Coadjutor Bishops ===
- Raphael Nguyễn Văn Diệp (15 August 1975 - 27 May 2000), did not succeed to the see (retired)
- Thomas Nguyễn Văn Tân (27 May 2000 - 3 July 2001)

=== Other secular clergy who became bishops ===
- Joseph Trần Văn Thiện (incardinated here in 1938), appointed Bishop of Mỹ Tho in 1960
- Jacques Nguyễn Ngọc Quang (incardinated here in 1938), appointed Coadjutor Bishop of Cần Thơ in 1965 and later succeeded
