= Géry Leuliet =

French bishop (1910-2015)

His Excellency, The Most Reverend Géry-Jacques-Charles Leuliet
- Bishop Emeritus of Amiens
- Diocese: Amiens
- See: Amiens
- Appointed: 14 February 1963
- Term ended: 15 January 1985
- Predecessor: René-Louis-Marie Stourm
- Successor: François Jacques Bussini

Orders
- Ordination: 8 July 1933
- Consecration: 9 May 1963 by Gérard-Maurice Eugène Huyghe

Personal details
- Born: 12 January 1910 Richebourg-l'Avoué, France
- Died: 1 January 2015 (aged 104) Arras, France
- Denomination: Roman Catholic
- Coat of arms: Géry-Jacques-Charles Leuliet's coat of arms

Ordination history of Géry Leuliet
History
Priestly ordination
- Ordained by: Gérard-Maurice Eugène Huyghe
Episcopal consecration
- Principal consecrator: René-Louis-Marie Stourm
- Co-consecrators: Victor-Jean Perrin
Episcopal succession
Bishops consecrated by Géry Leuliet as principal consecrator
- Jean Cuminal: 8 March 1975
- Joseph Wicquart: 11 October 1966
- Paul-Marie Guillaume: 9 December 1984

Géry-Jacques-Charles Leuliet (12 January 1910 – 1 January 2015) was a French prelate of the Roman Catholic Church and at the time of his death, was the oldest bishop of the Catholic Church, at 104 years of age.

Leuliet was born in France and was ordained to the priesthood on 8 July 1933 in the Roman Catholic Diocese of Arras. He was appointed Bishop of Amiens on February 14, 1963, and received his episcopal consecration on 9 May 1963. Leuliet retired as the bishop's dean in France on 15 January 1985. Upon the death of Nguyen Van Thien on 13 May 2012 he became the oldest living Roman Catholic bishop. He died at age 104 on 1 January 2015.
