= Anneia gens =

Ancient Roman family

The gens Anneia, occasionally written Annea, was a minor plebeian family of ancient Rome, known from the last century of the Roman Republic onward. Among the only members of this gens mentioned by Roman writers is Marcus Anneius, the legate of Cicero. Many others are known from inscriptions.

== Praenomina ==
The chief praenomina of the Anneii were Marcus and Gaius, two of the most common names at all periods of Roman history. Other common names were used by some of the Anneii, including Lucius, Publius, and Titus, along with individual instances of Aulus, Gnaeus, Quintus, and Sextus.

== Members ==
This list includes abbreviated praenomina. For an explanation of this practice, see filiation.

- Lucius Anneius L. f., named in an inscription from Urvinum Mataurense in Umbria, dating from the middle part of the first century BC.
- Marcus Anneius, a legate of Cicero, when the latter was governor of Cilicia in 51 BC. The following year, when Cicero campaigned against the Parthians, Anneius led a division of the Roman force.
- Marcus Anneius Q. f., named along with the augur Marcus Anneius Postumus in an inscription from Carsioli in Sabinum, dating from the latter half of the first century BC.
- Marcus Anneius Postumus, an augur named along with another Marcus Anneius in an inscription from Carsioli, dating from the latter half of the first century BC.
- Marcus Anneius M. l. Adjutor, a freedman buried at Bononia in Cisalpine Gaul, in a tomb built by his former master, Marcus Anneius Tertius, for himself, his wife, Magia Tertia, their daughter, Praeconina, and Adjutor, dating from the Julio-Claudian Dynasty.
- Marcus Anneius Sp. f. Tertius, built a family sepulchre at Bononia, dating from the Julio-Claudian Dynasty, for himself, his wife, Magia Tertia, their daughter, Praeconina, and the freedman Marcus Anneius Adjutor.<ref="CIL 11 6846"/>
- Anneia Q. [...] Quarta, the wife of Gnaeus Octavius Epituncanus, who built a tomb at Pisae in Etruria, dating from the first half of the first century AD for himself, Quarta, and their son, Gnaeus Octavius Lupercus.
- Lucius Anneius M. f. Catulus, buried in a first-century tomb at Luceria in Apulia, along with Marcus Anneius Honoratus and the freedman Marcus Anneius Rufio.
- Marcus Anneius Felix, buried along with his wife, Naevia Secunda, in a first-century tomb at Placentia in Cisalpine Gaul, built by his son, Marcus Anneius Primus, for himself and his parents.
- Marcus Anneius M. f. Honoratus, buried in a first-century tomb at Luceria, along with Lucius Anneius Catulus and the freedman Marcus Anneius Rufio.
- Marcus Anneius M. f. Primus, one of the seviri Augustales, built a first-century tomb at Placentia for himself and his parents, Marcus Anneius Felix and Naevia Secunda.
- Marcus Anneius M. l. Rufio, a freedman buried in a first-century tomb at Luceria, along with Marcus Anneius Honoratus and Lucius Anneius Catulus.
- Gaius Anneius, dedicated a first- or second-century monument at Ebusus in Hispania Citerior for his wife, Vettia Claudia.
- Gaius Anneius, named together with Gaius Fulvius in a list of persons buried at Hispellum in Umbria, dating from the last decade of the Augustan era.
- Anneia Procilla, the wife of Tiberius Claudius Nicostratus, one of the seviri Augustales and magistrates of the craftsman's guild at Praeneste in Latium. They and their children, Claudius Nicephorianus Proculus and Anneianus, were named in an inscription from that city, dating between the latter half of the first century, and the end of the second.
- Sextus Anneius Florus, buried at Interamna Nahars in Umbria, aged thirty-one years, eleven months, and sixteen days, in a tomb built by his wife, Cesolia Faustina, dating between the late first century, and the end of the second.
- Anneia M. f. Aciliana Arvensis, buried at Celti in Hispania Baetica, aged twenty-eight.
- Gnaeus Anneus Euhemerus, buried in a second-century tomb at Rome, dedicated by Anneus Onesimus, Anneus Liberalis, and Pompeia Januaria.
- Anneus Liberalis, along with Anneus Onesimus and Pompeia Januaria, dedicated a second-century tomb at Rome for Gnaeus Anneus Euhemerus.
- Anneus Onesimus, along with Anneus Liberalis and Pompeia Januaria, dedicated a second-century tomb at Rome for Gnaeus Anneus Euhemerus.
- Anneia, buried at Uchi Maius in Africa, aged between twenty-five and twenty-nine, in a tomb dating from the latter half of the second century.
- Anneia C. f. Parten[...], buried at Clusium in Etruria, in a tomb built by Gaius Clodius Privatus, dating between the latter half of the second century, and the first half of the third.
- Anneius Saturninus, named in late second-century pottery inscriptions from various locations in Dacia, concerning the Legio XIII Gemina.
- Anneius Raus, one of a number of senators named in an inscription from Rome, dating from early in the reign of Commodus.
- Publius Anneius Felix, a native of Regio Lepidi, was a bucinator, or trumpeter, named in a list of soldiers at Rome, dating from AD 183.
- Gaius Anneius Rufus, a structor, or builder, who was hired by the local decurions to build a gate at Pisaurum in Umbria.
- Gaius Anneius Zeno, curator of a monument dedicated by the corps of spearmen of Ostia to the emperor Caracalla in AD 203.
- Titus Anneius Apriclus, a soldier in the fifth cohort of the vigiles at Rome in AD 205, serving in the century of Aurelius Justus.
- Marcus Anneius Candidus, a soldier in the fifth cohort of the vigiles at Rome in AD 205, serving in the century of Ulpius Rutilianus.
- Marcus Anneius Candidus, a soldier in the fifth cohort of the vigiles at Rome in AD 205, serving in the century of Valens.
- Marcus Anneius Faustinus, a soldier in the fifth cohort of the vigiles at Rome in AD 205, serving in the century of Romulus.
- Gaius Anneius Fuscus, a soldier in the fifth cohort of the vigiles at Rome in AD 205, serving in the century of Ulpius Rutilianus.
- Lucius Anneius Marcianus, a soldier in the fifth cohort of the vigiles at Rome in AD 205, serving in the century of Valens.
- Gaius Anneius Maximus, a soldier in the fifth cohort of the vigiles at Rome in AD 205, serving in the century of Antullus.
- Gaius Anneius Maximus, a soldier in the fifth cohort of the vigiles at Rome in AD 205, serving in the century of Caesernius Senecio.
- Marcus Anneius Philippus, a soldier in the fifth cohort of the vigiles at Rome in AD 205, serving in the century of Romulus.
- Lucius Anneius Primitivus, a soldier in the fifth cohort of the vigiles at Rome in AD 205, serving in the century of Rufinus.
- Lucius Anneius Procule(ianus?), a soldier in the fifth cohort of the vigiles at Rome in AD 205, serving in the century of Aulupor.
- Lucius Anneius Proculus, a soldier in the fifth cohort of the vigiles at Rome in AD 205, serving in the century of Aulupor.
- Titus Anneius Quintianus, a soldier in the fifth cohort of the vigiles at Rome in AD 205, serving in the century of Ulpius Rutilianus.
- Marcus Anneius Salvianus, a soldier in the fifth cohort of the vigiles at Rome in AD 205, serving in the century of Romulus.
- Gaius Anneius Saturninus, a soldier in the fifth cohort of the vigiles at Rome in AD 205, serving in the century of Valens.
- Anneius Rogatus, a duplicarius, or soldier entitled to receive double pay, serving in the Legio III Augusta at Lambaesis in Numidia during the reign of Elagabalus.
- Publius Anneius P. f. Probus, a native of Poetovium in Pannonia, was a soldier in the first cohort of the Praetorian Guard, named on a bronze plate embedded in the wall of the temple of Augustus and Minerva at Industria in Liguria in AD 254.

=== Undated Anneii ===
- Anneia, buried at Ariminum in Cisalpine Gaul, in a tomb dedicated by the freedman Gaius Clodius Musa.
- Gaius Anneius, a potter whose maker's mark has been found at Curictae in Dalmatia, in Venetia and Histria, at Tarraco in Hispania Citerior, and at the site of modern Sopron, formerly part of Raetia.
- Gaius Anneius, named in a bronze inscription from an uncertain province.
- Marcus Anneius, a potter whose maker's mark has been found on ceramics from Volsinii in Etruria.
- Anneia Aphrodisia, buried at Carthage in Africa, aged forty.
- Gaius Anneius Bassillianus, named on a lead pipe from Rome.
- Publius Anneius P. l. Campester, a freedman, and one of the seviri Augustales, buried at Placentia, in a sepulchre built by his friend, the cornicen, or bugler Lucius Mettius Primus, for himself, hiw wife, Petronia Secunda, Campester, the freedwoman Titia Mettia Capra, and Gaius Domitius Raptus.
- Anneia A. l. Chryse, a freedwoman, who together with the freedman Paba Philomusus and freedwoman Acinia Hedone, built a tomb at Volsinii in Etruria for themselves, and for the freedwoman Pabaea Rufina and the freedman Paba Alcimus.
- Anneius Felix, buried at Lambaesis in Numidia, aged forty-four years, ten months, in a tomb built by Marcella.
- Anneius Fornatus, buried at the site of modern Shuraqa, formerly part of Africa, aged twenty.
- Gaius Anneius C. l. Hilarus, a freedman named in an inscription from Rome, along with his wife, the freedwoman Sextilia Nice, and the freedman Gnaeus Atellius Hilarus.
- Anneia Libosa, built a tomb at Verecunda in Numidia for her mother, Anneia Maxima.
- Anneia Marcella, together with her husband, Gaius Titius Genialis, built a tomb at Forum Cornelii in Cisalpine Gaul for their young son, also called Gaius Titius Genialis, aged one year, two months, and twenty days.
- Anneius Marcellinus, buried at Fanum Fortunae in Umbria, aged seven years, six days, in a tomb built by his father, Anneius Marcellus, for Marcellinus, his brother, also named Anneius Marcellus, and their mother, Nenolava Fontinalis.
- Anneius Marcellus, built a tomb at Fanum Fortunae for his wife Nenolava Fontinalis, aged fifty-one, and their sons, Anneius Marcellus and Anneius Marcellinus.
- Anneius Marcellus, buried at Fanum Fortunae, aged nine years, seven months, and twelve days, in a tomb built by his father, also named Anneius Marcellus, for his sons, Marcellus and Anneius Marcellinus, and their mother, Nenolava Fontinalis.
- Anneia Maxima, buried at Verecunda, aged eighty, in a tomb built by her daughter, Anneia Libosa.
- Gaius Anneus Onesimus, dedicated a tomb at Rome for his son, Ulpius Venerius, aged seventeen years, two months.
- Anneia Pia, a girl buried at Rome, aged seven years, nine months, six days, and eight hours. She was born on the Ides of August, and "paid her debt" on the seventh day before the Ides of November. (Note: August 13; November 7.)
- Titus Anneius Priscus, named in an inscripton from Praeneste.
- Marcus Anneius Salsulus, dedicated a tomb at Theveste in Africa for his son, whose name has not been preserved.
- Anneia Saturnina, buried at Hippo Regius in Africa, aged sixty.
- Quintus Anneius Theubulus, a medicus, or doctor, buried at Spoletium in Umbria.

== See also ==
- List of Roman gentes

== Bibliography ==
- Marcus Tullius Cicero, Epistulae ad Familiares.
- René Cagnat et alii, L'Année épigraphique (The Year in Epigraphy, abbreviated AE), Presses Universitaires de France (1888–present).
- Dictionary of Greek and Roman Biography and Mythology, William Smith, ed., Little, Brown and Company, Boston (1849).
- Inscriptiones Daciae Romanae (Inscriptions from Roman Dacia, abbreviated IDR), Bucharest (1975–present).
- Mélanges d'Archéologie et d'Histoire de l'École Française de Rome (Archaeological and Historical Collections of the French School at Rome), Paris, Rome (1881–present).
- Theodor Mommsen et alii, Corpus Inscriptionum Latinarum (The Body of Latin Inscriptions, abbreviated CIL), Berlin-Brandenburgische Akademie der Wissenschaften (1853–present).
- Ettore Pais, Corporis Inscriptionum Latinarum Supplementa Italica (Italian Supplement to the Corpus Inscriptionum Latinarum), Rome (1884).
