= Jacques Nguyễn Văn Mầu =

Vietnamese bishop (1914-2013)

His Excellency Jacques Nguyễn Văn Mầu
- Bishop of Vĩnh Long
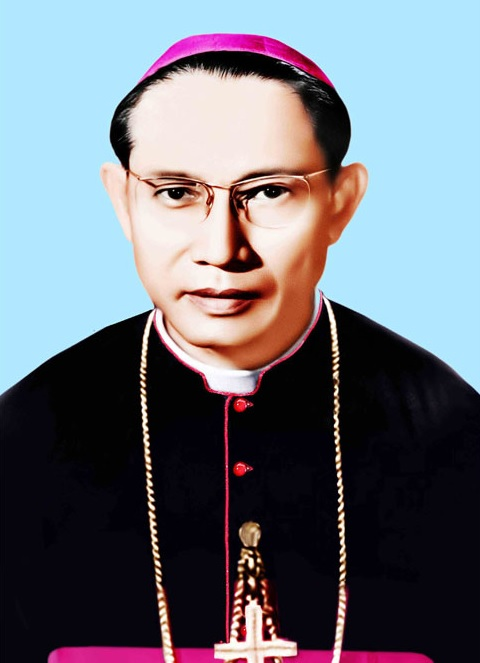
- Native name: Giacôbê Nguyễn Văn Mầu
- Church: Catholic
- Province: Hồ Chí Minh City
- See: Vĩnh Long
- Appointed: 12 July 1968
- Installed: 19 September 1968
- Term ended: 3 July 2001
- Predecessor: Antoine Nguyễn Văn Thiện
- Successor: Thomas Nguyễn Văn Tân

Orders
- Ordination: 21 September 1940
- Consecration: 12 September 1968 by Angelo Palmas

Personal details
- Born: 22 January 1914 Bà Rịa, French Indochina
- Died: 31 January 2013 (aged 99) Vĩnh Long, Việt Nam
- Motto: Amor et Labor (Love and Labor)
- Coat of arms

Jacques Nguyễn Văn Mầu (22 January 1914 – 31 January 2013) was a Vietnamese bishop of the Roman Catholic Church.

== Biography ==
Jacques Mầu was born in Bà Rịa in 1914. He was ordained a priest on 21 September 1940 and served as the Rector of Saint Joseph Major Seminary in Saigon from 1966 to 1968.

He was appointed Bishop of Vĩnh Long by Pope Paul VI, following the resignation of Bishop Antoine Nguyễn Văn Thiện on 12 July 1968. He received his episcopal consecration by Archbishop Angelo Palmas, Apostolic Delegate to Vietnam, on 12 September 1968 at the Saigon Notre-Dame Basilica.

On 3 July 2001, he retired from the diocese of Vĩnh Long, reaching the age of 87. He died on 31 January 2013, aged 99.
