= Marcus Anneius =

Marcus Anneius was legate of Marcus Tullius Cicero during his government in Cilicia, in 51 BC.

Anneius appears to have had some pecuniary dealings with the inhabitants of Sardis, and Cicero gave him a letter of introduction to the propraetor Quintus Minucius Thermus, that the latter might assist him in the matter.

In Cicero's campaign against the Parthians in 50, Anneius commanded part of the Roman troops.

== See also ==
- Anneia gens
