= Annius =

Annius may refer to:

- Any Roman man of the gens Annia (see for list)
- The Latin name of Annio da Viterbo, a fifteenth-century Dominican friar, scholar, and historian, remembered chiefly for his fabrications
