= Thomas Nguyễn Văn Tân =

Vietnamese Roman Catholic bishop

Thomas Nguyễn Văn Tân (December 27, 1940 − August 17, 2013) was a Vietnamese Roman Catholic bishop.

Ordained to the priesthood in 1969, Nguyên Văn Tân was named coadjutor bishop of the Roman Catholic Diocese of Vĩnh Long, Vietnam and then succeeded as diocesan bishop. He died in 2013 while still in office.
