= Hispellum =

Ancient town of Umbria, Italy

Coordinates: 42°59′30″N 12°40′12″E

Hispellum (modern Spello) was an ancient town of Umbria, Italy, 6 km (3.7 mi) north of Fulginiae on the road to Perusia.

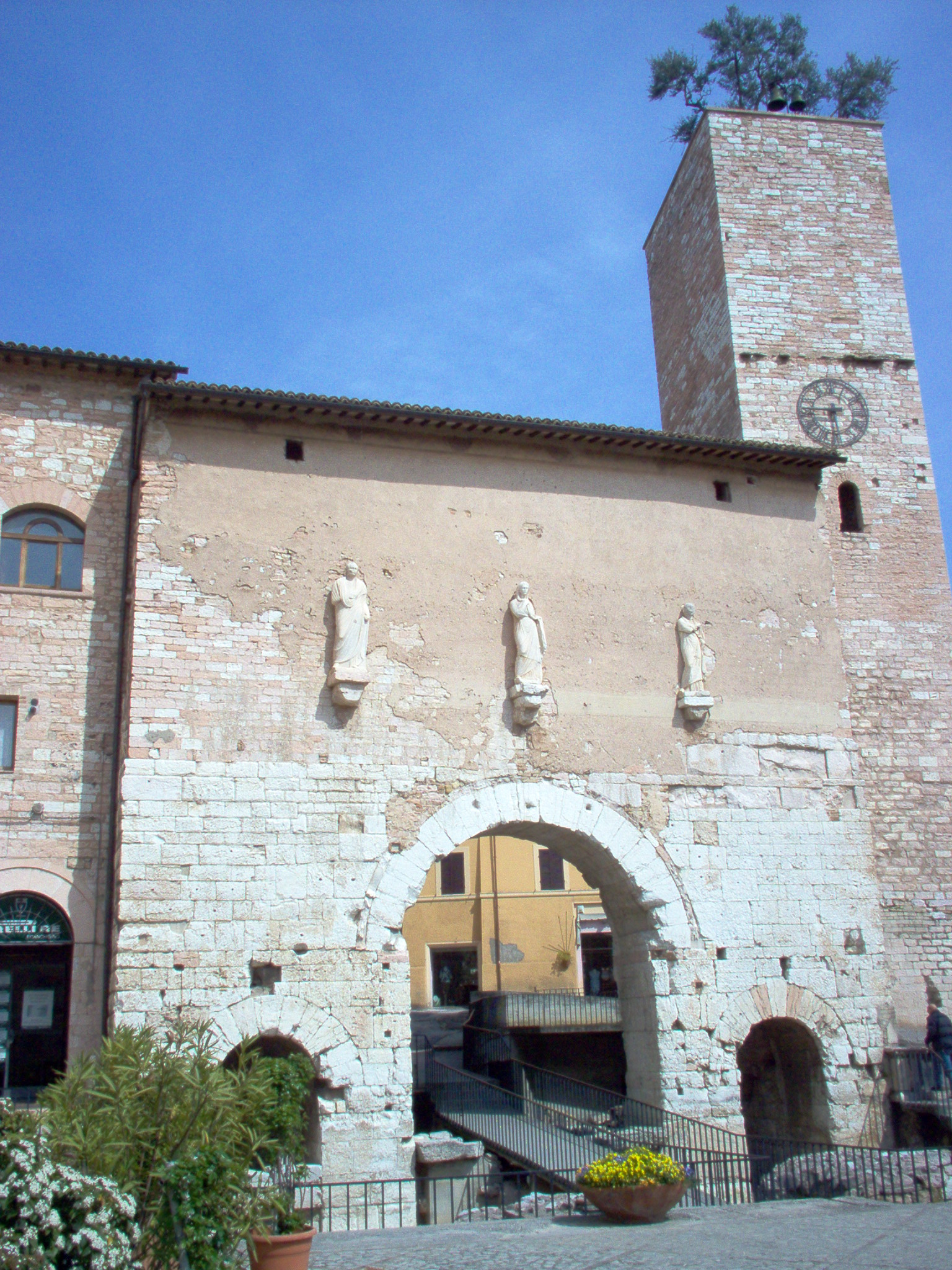
The Porta Consolare, 1st century BC; the statues are from the area of the amphitheatre

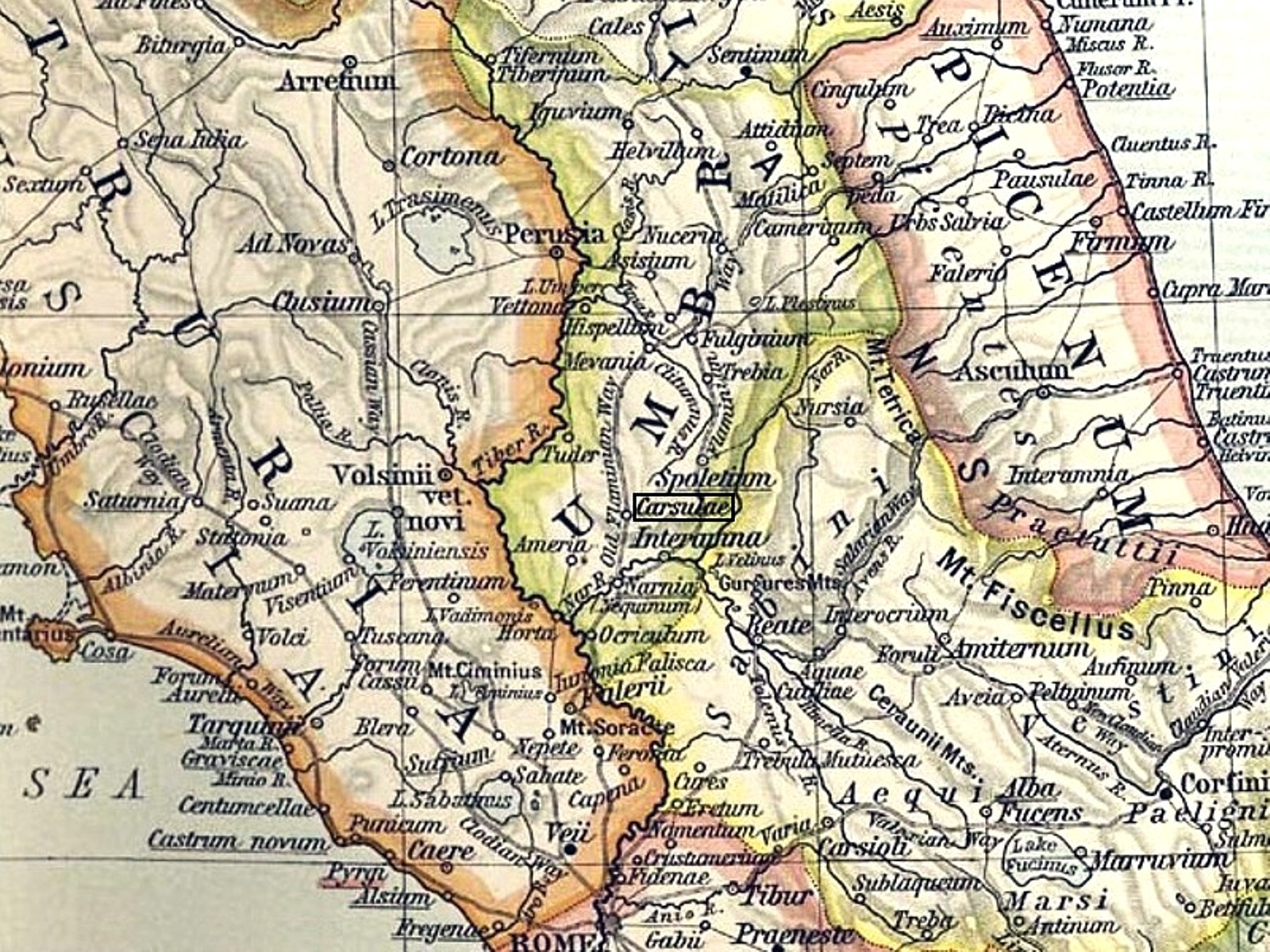
Map of part of central Italy at the time of Augustus

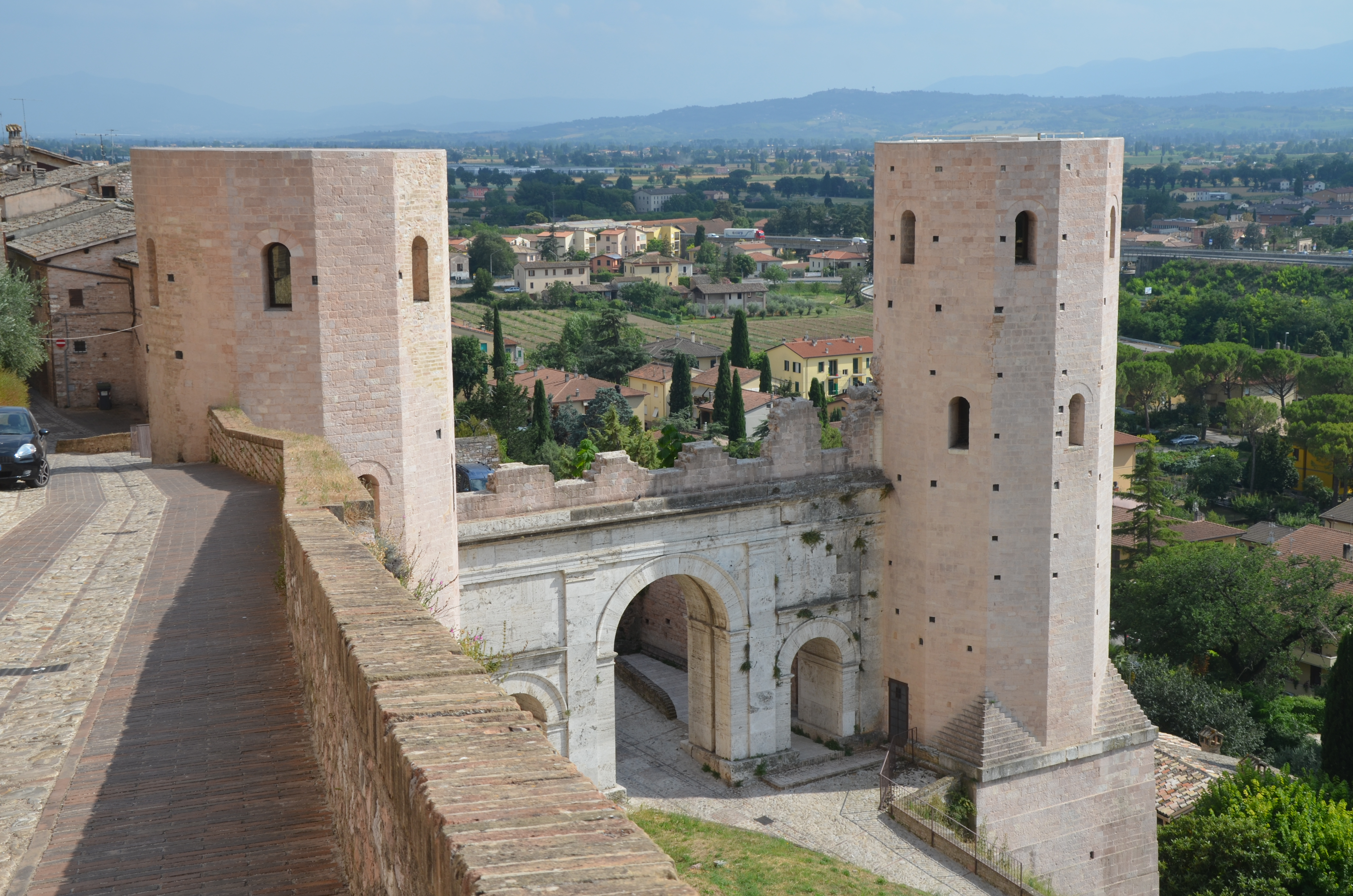
"Gate of Venus", 1st century BC

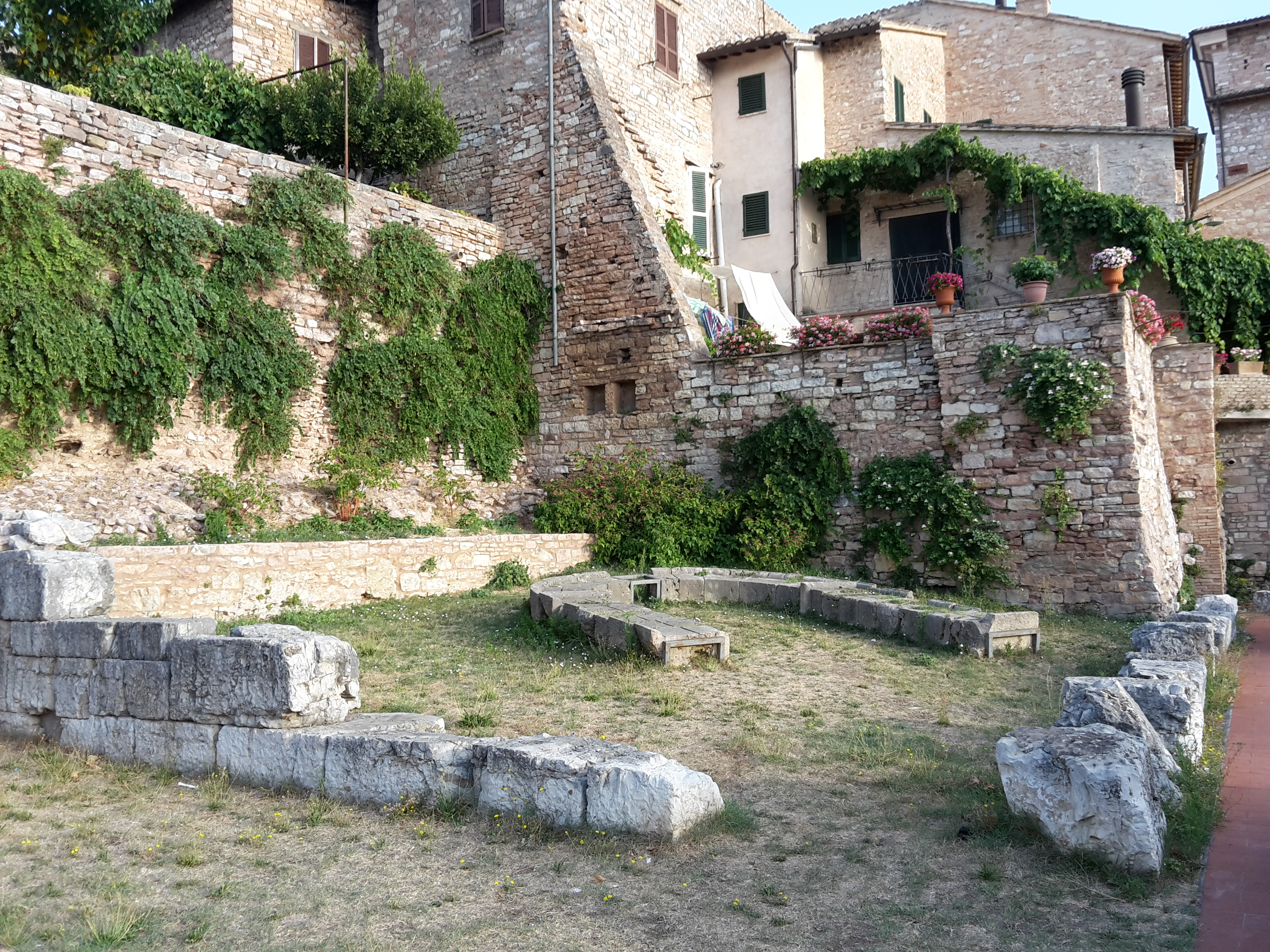
Forum

== The Site ==
The site of Hispellum was significant as the valley had two major rivers, the Clitumnus and Tinia mentioned by Silius Italicus, giving fertility to the land. From 220 BC the Via Flaminia gave the city a direct link to Rome.

== History ==
The area of Hispellum has been occupied from the Iron Age (7th c. BC), as shown by archaeology, particularly in the necropolis at Portonaccio, although most of the tombs date to the 3rd or 2nd century BC. Traces of the early settlement from the 7th to 4th centuries BC have been found near the church of Sant’ Andrea.

Umbria had been conquered by the Romans by approximately 260 BC. Incorporation into the Roman state occurred soon afterwards; some Umbri were given full citizenship or citizenship without the right to vote and about 40,000 Romans settled in the region.

Hispellum was one of the Umbrian towns that resisted Hannibal and possibly sent aid to Rome during the Second Punic War. It began to be urbanised from the late 3rd century when a long artificial terrace with a retaining wall of opera quadrata using local limestone laid without mortar was built near Sant’ Sant'Andrea in the area of the later forum.

Hispellum is mentioned in Pliny, Strabo and Ptolemy's Geography.

The ancient sanctuary to Venus (or her Umbrian equivalent) was an important sacred place for Umbrian tribes from the 3rd c. BC and the site was monumentalised, at least in the south-eastern part towards the city, in the Republican age (2nd-1st century BC).

Some of the land of the Valle Umbra was brutally confiscated by Augustus to found colonies there as a reward for tens of thousands of Caesar's veterans who had fought for the Triumvirate and additionally, tens of thousands of them who had fought for the Republican cause in the war at Philippi. This led to the Umbrian revolt culminating in the Perusine War (41-40 BC). Hispellum supported Augustus in the Perusine War and became Colonia Julia Hispellum in ca. 41-40 BC. Augustus also favoured Hispellum by extending its territory to the springs and sanctuary of the Clitunno, 20 km distant, which had originally belonged to the territory of Mevania, and the city provided a public bath and accommodation there.

Under Augustus, the town was also developed and monumentalisation of the hill slope was increased by the extension of the sanctuary with inclusion of the theatre following a Hellenistic model, as at Tibur, Praeneste, and other sites in Lazio.

It must have received more colonists under Vespasian as it is also referred to in inscriptions as "Colonia Urbana Flavia". It received another influx of veteran colonists under Hadrian.

Hispellum received the name of Flavia Constans by a rescript of the emperor Constantine recorded on a marble tablet found in 1733 at the centre of the sanctuary and now at the Communal Palace of Spello. It showed that the city was important, as it was thereby appointed the seat of the annual meetings of the Umbrian peoples, which had previously taken place only in the Etruscan city of Volsinii.

== Sights ==
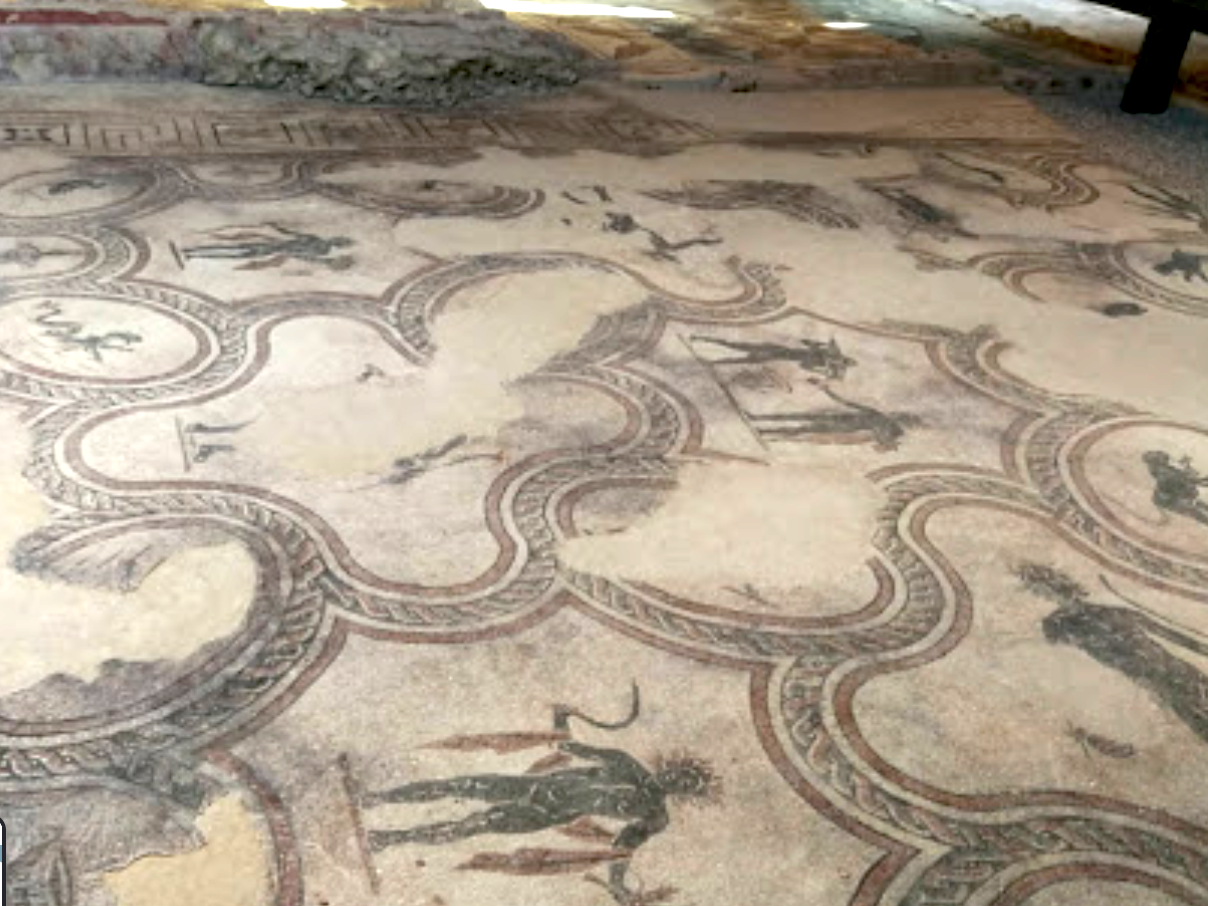
Triclinium mosaic

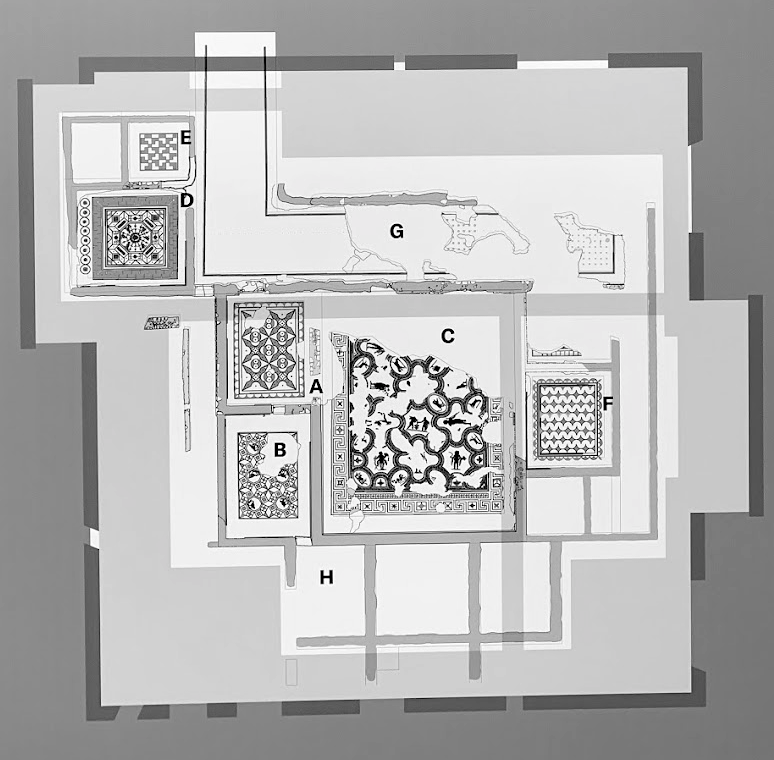
Plan villa of mosaics

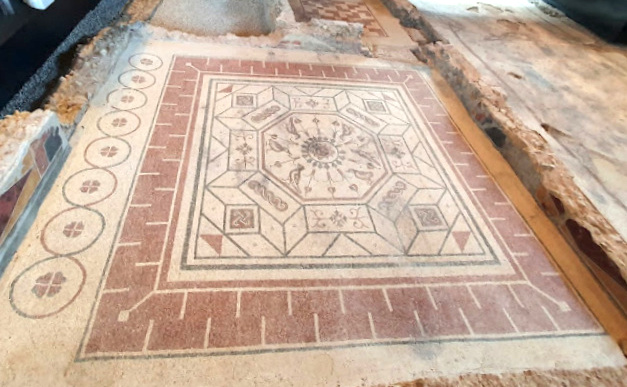
Radiant Sun mosaic, Villa of Mosaics

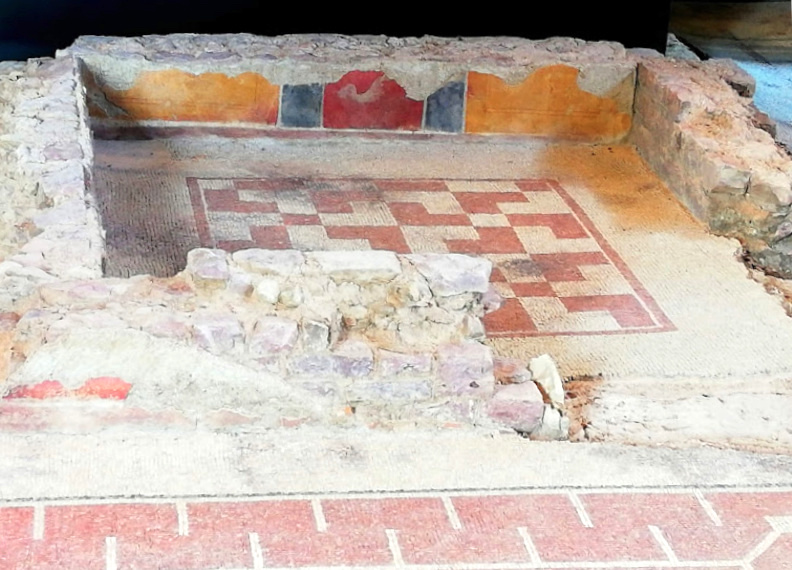
Villa of Mosaics

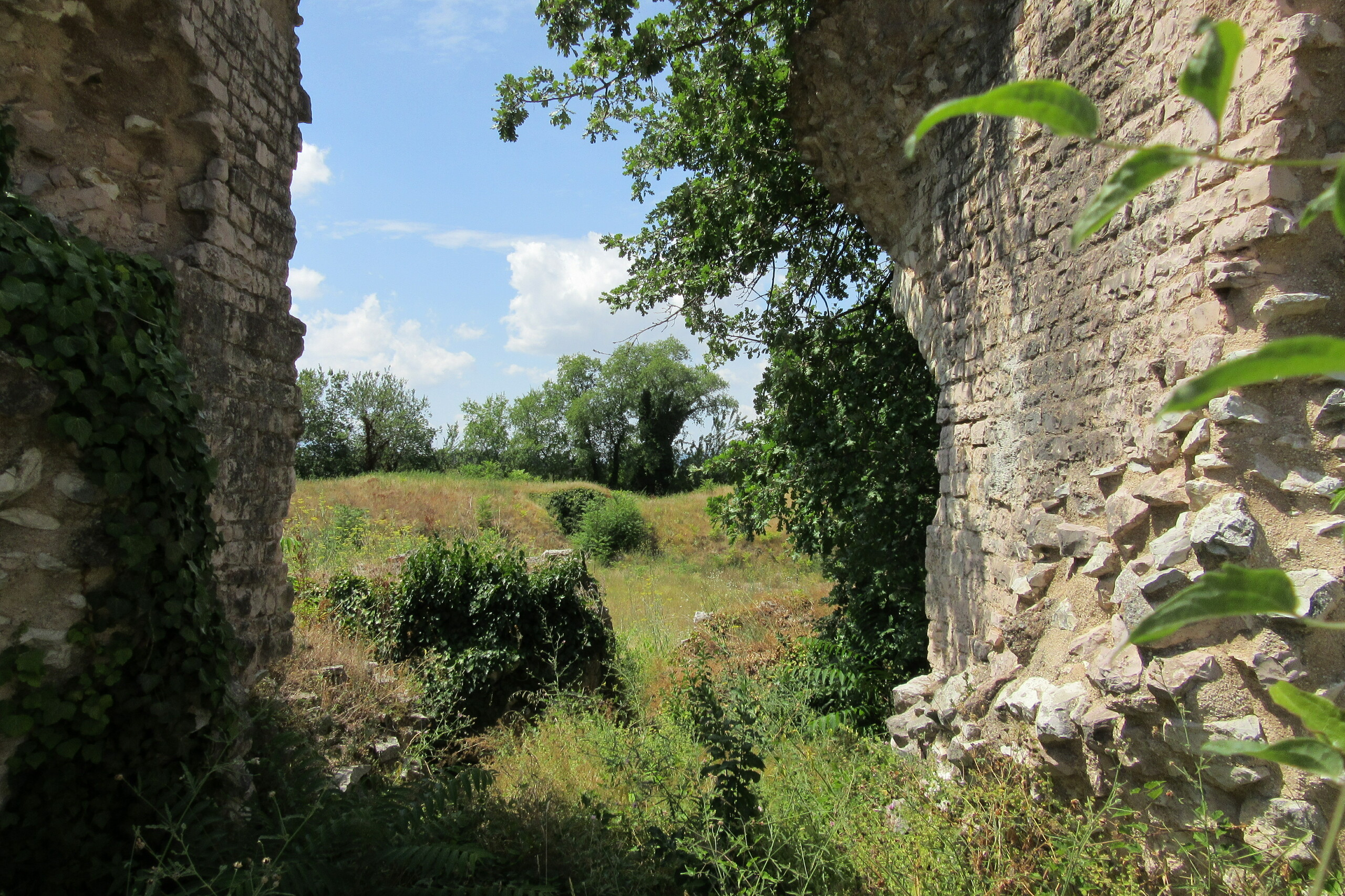
Amphitheatre

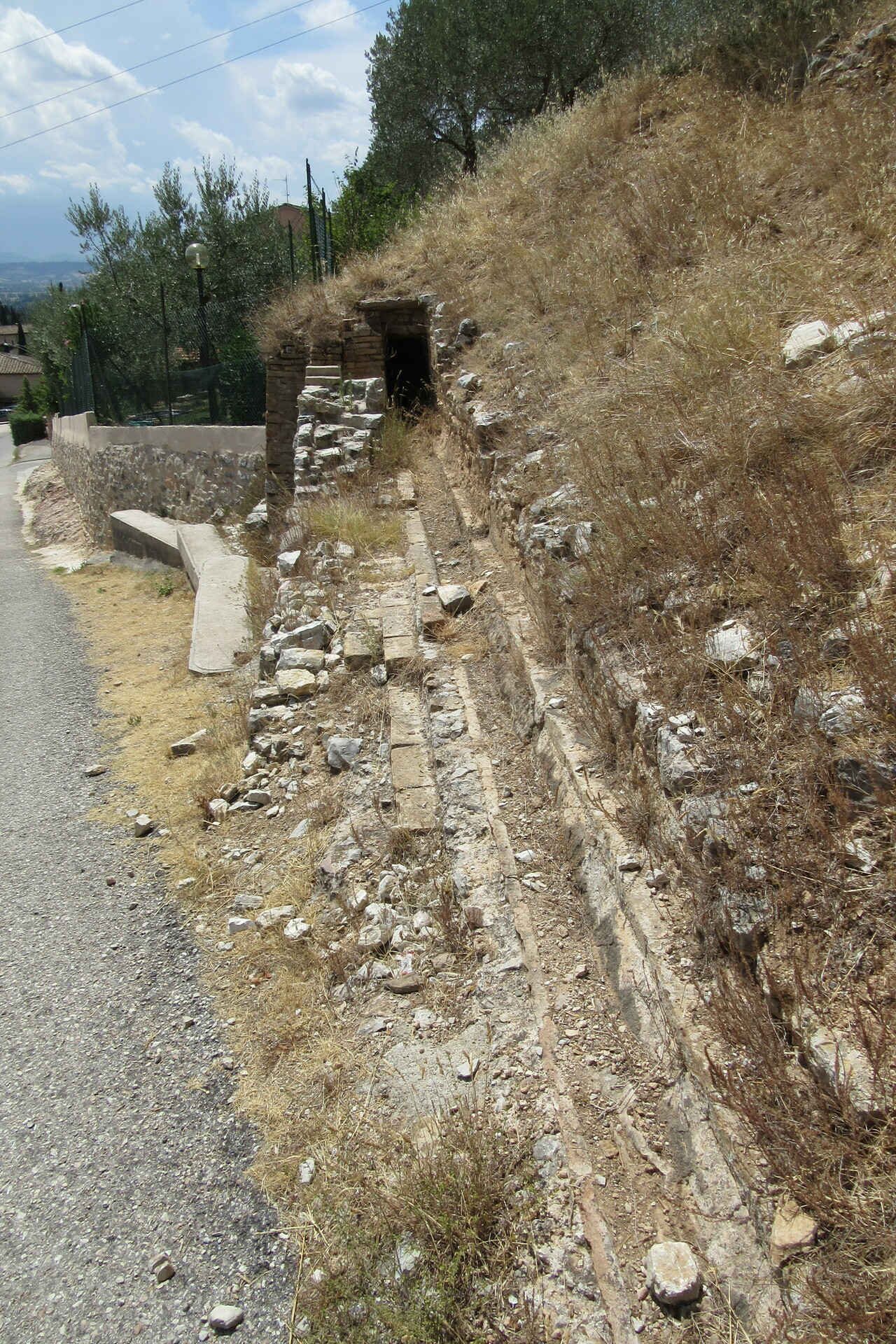
Aqueduct of Spello

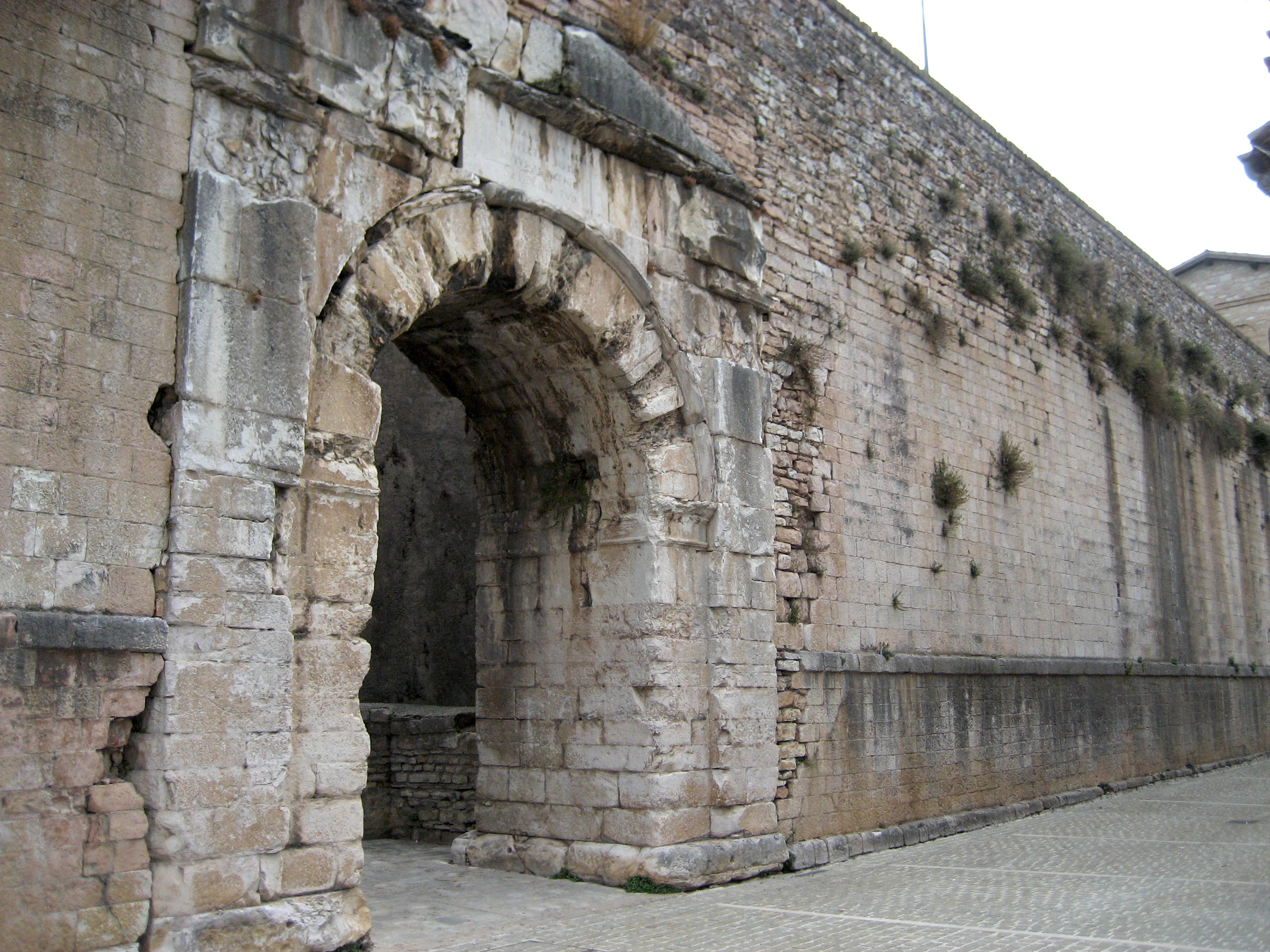
Porta Urbica

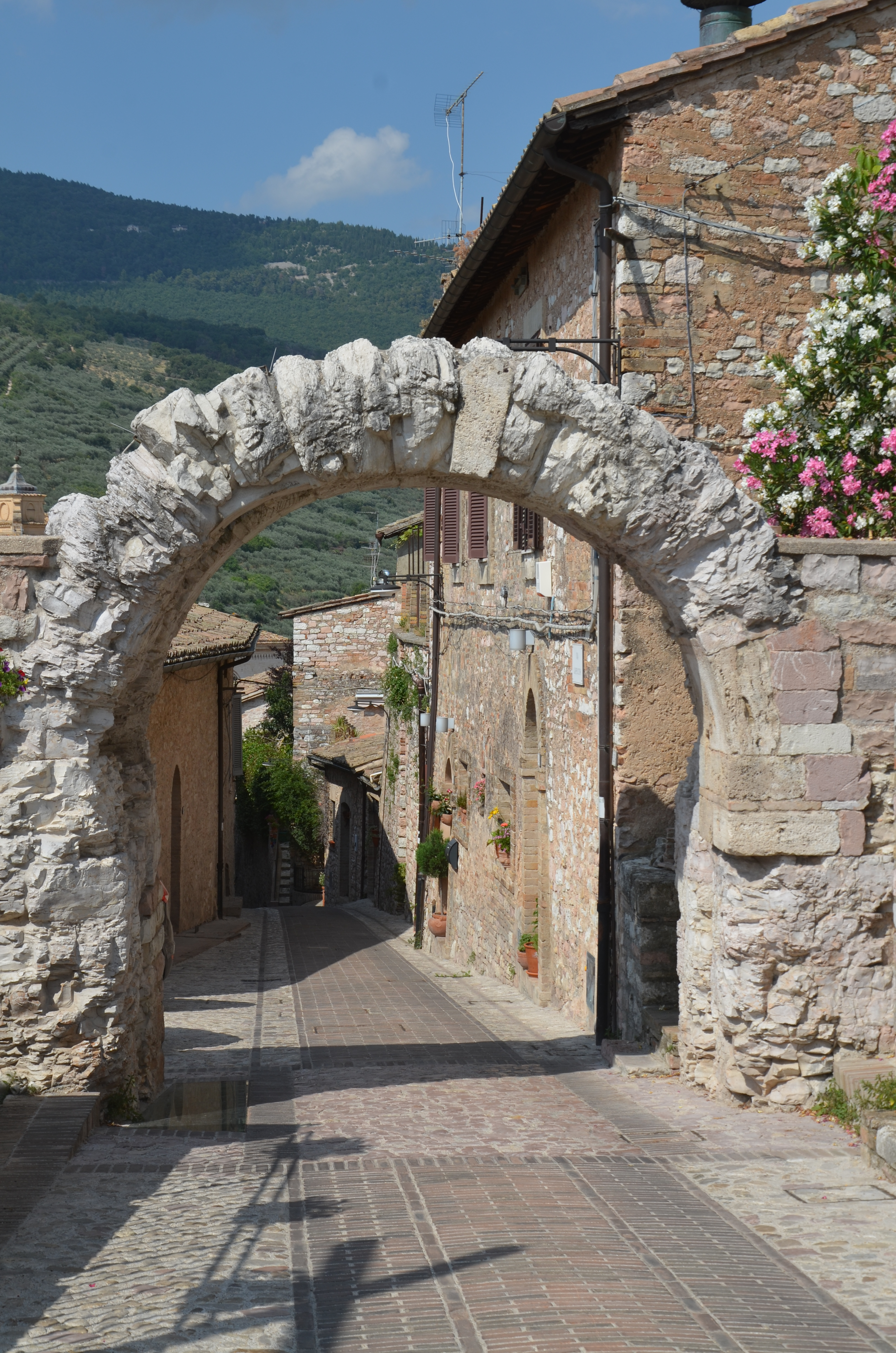
Porta dell'Arce gate

A survey of the upper town in the late 20th century showed that about 80% of the buildings lie on Roman foundations, making Spello the most Roman town in modern Umbria.

Roman remains also include:

- The rich and elaborate Villa of the Mosaics has been excavated in recent years and is open to the public.
- The 1.8 km-long walls are among the finest specimens of Roman wall in central Italy, formed by a very thick and compact concrete structure, covered on both sides by a very regular face of rectangular blocks of local pink limestone
- The gate by which the town is entered (Porta Consolare) is ancient and has three portrait statues above it, although they are not original to the gate, having been found in the area of the amphitheatre
- Five other gates may still be seen as part of the city wall, built of rectangular blocks of Subasio limestone. They include the Porta Venere, Porta dell'Arce, Porta Urbica
- The upper town also has vestiges of what is possibly a triumphal arch: the inscription is dedicated to Augustus.
- In the interior of the city are sections of large block walls, substructures for terracing the hill.
- The Umbrian sanctuary of Venus includes the grounds of the Villa Fidelia as well as remains of the amphitheatre (the entrance and some stone curtain, which stood in the plain alongside the road to Assisi, can be seen to the northwest of the town), a temple of Venus, baths beneath the church of San Claudio near the amphitheatre with geometric mosaic floors and heated rooms.
- The forum: the whole area between the Palazzo Comunale and the Convent of S. Andrea was terraced on the eastern and south-eastern sides by a supporting wall in local limestone preserved for about 130 m.
- a villa rustica in via Baldini from the 1st/2nd centuries AD with thermal baths in 3 rooms. It was sited on a necropolis of the Republican age. The walls are preserved to their full height in the SE corner where part of a basin with stone slabs covered in cocciopesto has been brought to light: In the southwest corner are remains of the lower part of a square basin and tiled flooring in tiles (perhaps a settling tank), as in the immediate vicinity are traces of a furnace.
- A large collection of local Roman inscriptions is housed in the Palazzo Comunale.
- Roman remains under the present Piazza della Repubblica.

=== Villa of the Mosaics ===
The villa is one of the most important Roman sites in Umbria, even in Italy, with its spectacular mosaic floors of extraordinary technical quality in terms of design and colour rendering.

Of a total area of 500m^{2}, there are 20 rooms remaining, 10 of which contain magnificent mosaic floors with geometric motifs and figures in various colours: white, red, black. green and yellow. A large peristyle, a porticoed courtyard that surrounded the garden, complete with statues and fountains, was surrounded by a series of elaborate rooms with mosaics. The most important room was the triclinium with the Seasons mosaic.

It was first built in the Augustan age and modified at the end of the 2nd century. The villa was located along a secondary branch of the ancient Via Flaminia road, which came from Rome and extended through Umbria and continued to Rimini. It was a villa rustica, a farming estate with an agricultural part including several service rooms.

It was discovered in 2005, while building a car park in a sports field just outside Spello's walls.

=== The sanctuary complex ===
A sanctuary of the Augustan period, which included a grandiose theatre-temple-amphitheatre complex, is located partially in the grounds of the Renaissance-style villa Fidelia to the northwest of the city. Geophysical surveys have allowed reconstruction of the sanctuary and its relationship to the theatre. The sanctuary occupied the area near the bottom of the Spello hill facing west as part of a scenographic layout. Three terraces were created to support the villa, two of which with mighty walls in Roman concrete (opus caementicium) covered with opus vittatum, which supported the lower terraces are still visible. The second terrace contains the present "Italian" garden and Villa Fidelia itself, which overlaps the lower terrace. The lower wall has remains of a large central nymphaeum and a quadrangular niche. Of the upper wal,l only the internal part in opus caementicium remains.

On the other side of the road are the scanty remains of the theatre, as well as the amphitheatre.

During the construction of the villa Fidelia, around 1600, an inscription was found on a mosaic floor (CIL, XΙ, 5264), with a dedication of a statue and a base to Venus by the quinquennial duumvirs M. Granius and S. Lollius. The Church of S. Fedele in opus mixtum is probably to be connected with the late phase of the sanctuary mentioned by a Constantinian rescript (CIL, XI, 5265) of 333-337 AD, in which the emperor at the request of the inhabitants of the city allows the Umbrian population to be able to meet, no longer in Volsinii, and celebrate the theatrical and gladiatorial games with the Etruscan population.

The precious epigraphic text, found downstream from the sanctuary, testifies that the sacred theatre-temple structure existed prior to the rescript and must have already served for the annual meetings of the league of the Umbrians. The special geographical position of the sanctuary appears particularly strategic within the Umbrian valley, at the branch of the Via Flaminia towards Perusia and in visual and ideological connection with the sanctuaries at Mevania, Vettona, Urvinum Hortense, and Trebiae.

=== The aqueduct ===
The Roman Aqueduct from Collepino to Spello is almost 5 km long. It was used until the 19th century and has been recently restored. It was mainly underground but has been exposed in several places where it runs to the side of the Chiona river, its specus forming an artificial terrace. On the lower wall of the aqueduct are many rectangular openings for inspection and maintenance.

=== Porta Urbica ===
Also known as the Porta San Ventura from the nearby church of the same name, this gate has a monumental character with a sober façade, and is a decorative arch inserted in the western walls. Built in the Augustan age, the gate has a single round arch and is built of ashlars of local limestone, is supported by smooth Tuscan pillars with no base, and has an architrave above crowned by a pediment. The gate was reopened in 1960 after being walled up for many years.
